= USS Augusta (1853) =

Gunboat of the United States Navy

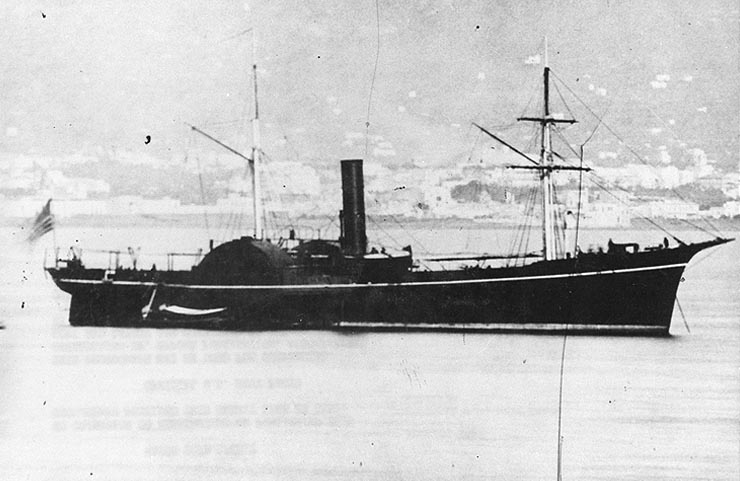
- USS Augusta

History

United States
- Name: USS Augusta
- Namesake: Augusta, Georgia
- Builder: William H. Webb
- Launched: 30 September 1852
- Acquired: by purchase, 1 August 1861
- Commissioned: 28 September 1861
- Decommissioned: 6 January 1865
- Fate: Sold, 2 December 1868; sank, 30 September 1877
- Notes: Launched 1852, Completed 1853 by William Henry Webb in the East River of New York City. Augusta's sister vessel, Knoxville, caught fire and was destroyed in New York City in 1856.

General characteristics
- Type: Steamer
- Displacement: 1,310 long tons (1,330 t)
- Length: 220 ft (67 m)
- Beam: 35 ft 4 in (10.77 m)
- Draft: 14 ft 3 in (4.34 m)
- Depth of hold: 21 ft 10 in (6.65 m)
- Propulsion: Steam engine; side paddle wheels
- Speed: 11 kn (13 mph; 20 km/h)
- Complement: 157 officers and enlisted
- Armament: 8 × 32 pdr (15 kg) smoothbore guns, 1 × 12 pdr (5.4 kg) rifle

The second USS Augusta was a side-wheel steamer in the United States Navy during the American Civil War. She was named for the city of Augusta, Georgia.

Designed and constructed by the noted American shipbuilder, William H. Webb, the second Augusta was launched on 30 September 1852 and later completed in 1853 at New York City and operated out of that port carrying passengers and freight for the New York and Savannah Steam Navigation Company on runs to Savannah, Georgia and New Orleans, Louisiana. Augusta also had a sister vessel by the name of Knoxville. Early in the Civil War, as the Union Navy was expanding its fleet for the Herculean task of blockading the Confederate coast, the Federal Government purchased the side-wheeler at New York on 1 August 1861. She was fitted out for naval service by the New York Navy Yard and commissioned there on 28 September 1861, Commander Enoch Greenleafe Parrott in command.

== Civil War operations ==
A part of Flag Officer Samuel Francis du Pont's newly established South Atlantic Blockading Squadron, Augusta was assigned to the task force then being formed to capture a naval base on the Confederacy's Atlantic coast somewhere within the new squadron's jurisdiction which stretched from the Florida Keys to the border separating North and South Carolina.

Augusta departed New York on 16 October, reached Hampton Roads two days later, remaining there while the other warships of Du Pont's fleet assembled. When she sortied with them on 29 October, the captain of each ship carried sealed orders to be opened only in the event of the force's separation. While the fleet of some 75 ships slowly sailed south, a storm arose in the wee hours of 31 October, shortly after Augusta passed Cape Hatteras. By 3:30 that afternoon, the wind had increased so greatly in violence that Du Pont signaled the commanding officer of the other ships that they were free to leave the formation and to proceed in whatever manner seemed most conducive to safety. While suffering varying amounts of damage as they battled the tempest, some ships were forced to turn back; two transports went to the bottom; but most continued on toward their original objectives.

As she proceeded south, Augusta – which had been steaming on the starboard flank of the transports – managed to weather the hurricane; and the wind had abated by the time she passed Charleston, South Carolina on 3 November. The next day, she reached an anchorage just off the bar outside Port Royal harbor. Two days were then spent in charting the nearby waters – from which all aids to navigation had been removed; in making reconnaissance probes to feel out the Confederate defensive forces and to locate their guns; and in seeing that the commander of each unit clearly understood his role in the forthcoming attack.

For the invasion, Du Pont divided his warships into two groups: a main squadron which was to bombard the Southern forts that defended the harbor and a flanking squadron which was to parry any attempted counterthrust by the Confederate fleet. Augusta was the last of the five ships composing the flanking group.

Fort Walker on Hilton Head – the stronger of the two defensive works protecting the harbor – was some 2.5 mi (4.0 km) across the water to the southwest from Fort Beauregard on Bay Point. Since this distance was great enough to prevent the guns of one fort from effectively supporting those of the other, Du Pont decided to engage the Southern positions, one at a time, beginning with the stronger, Fort Walker. Having learned that most of its guns faced south, the flag officer had his main squadron steam by the Hilton Head shore along a counterclockwise, elliptical path which kept its warships out of effective range of the Confederate batteries. Then, when it had reached a point beyond the traversing limit of these guns, this squadron began a turn to port along a wide arc which closed the shore as the Union ships opened fire on the fort and steamed back in the direction from which they had come. This maneuver prevented most of Fort Walker's cannon from getting into action while leaving them almost completely exposed to the Federal salvoes.

Meanwhile, Du Pont's flanking squadron – including Augusta – followed the main group into the harbor and took station to the northwest of this ellipse in position to turn back any Southern warships which attempted to enter the fray. They did not have long to wait. The small Confederate squadron – commanded by Flag Officer Josiah Tattnall III, CSN – soon steamed out and opened fire on Augusta and her consorts. However, the Union ships answered with a barrage that soon convinced Tattnall that his ships had more than met their match and compelled him to withdraw into Skull Creek. Nevertheless, Tattnall's ships did aid the Southern cause by ferrying Fort Walker's troops from Hilton Head to the mainland.

After driving off the Confederate squadron, the warships of Du Pont's flanking squadron joined in the bombardment of Fort Walker. When Penguin was disabled by a shot from Hilton Head, Augusta took her in tow and enabled her to resume firing.

Unable to withstand the Union shelling, the Confederates evacuated Fort Walker which was soon occupied by Northern sailors and Marines. Du Pont then turned his attention to Fort Beauregard across the harbor and soon had it too in his hands.

Immediately after the battle, Du Pont ordered Augusta to sail for Savannah. She arrived off that port that same day, and reestablished the blockade which had been open since 1 November, when the hurricane had blown Savannah and Monticello out to sea. At the end of the second week of November, she accompanied Flag on a reconnaissance of Tybee Island, which guarded the entrance to Savannah Harbor and found it to be abandoned. On 18 November, she reconnoitered Wassau Sound and reported that it must be covered if the blockade of Savannah were to be effective. Finally on the last day of November, Augusta aided Savannah, Flag, Pocahontas, Seneca, and Seminole in taking E. J. Waterman after she ran aground on Tybee Island.

The next day, 1 December, Du Pont ordered Augusta to Charleston for blockade duty, and she spent much of the next year and one-half as the flagship of the senior Union naval officer off that strongly defended city, the "birthplace of secession." On 6 December, she took the British blockade runner Cheshire – of and from Liverpool – some 12 mi (19 km) southeast of Tybee Light. She towed the captured vessel as far north as Charleston and then sent her on to New York under a prize crew for adjudication.

On New Year's Eve, she captured Island Belle about 12 mi (19 km) southeast of Bull's Island light. Laden with sugar and molasses, that 166 long tons (169 t) schooner of Nassau, New Providence, had departed Trinidad de Cuba ostensibly bound for Baltimore, Maryland under English colors. However, the vessel – which had been built at Charleston earlier that year under the name, General Ripley – was heading straight for Bull's Bay. Since her British registration – dated 11 November 1861 – seemed to be a subterfuge and her clearance was obviously spurious, Parrott sent the prize to New York.

One of Augusta's more interesting experiences during the war occurred on the morning of 13 May 1862 when the Confederate armed steamer Planter steamed out of Charleston harbor. This vessel had been used by the Confederate Army as a transport and dispatch boat. While Planter had been moored to a wharf in Charleston and her captain was ashore, her pilot – a slave named Robert Smalls – had embarked his family and a few friends and quietly slipped out to sea. When Planter had passed beyond range of the last Southern gun, Smalls lowered her Confederate colors and hoisted a white flag, before steaming up to the Union clipper ship Onward and surrendering. His brave deed brought freedom to himself, seven other black men, five women, and three children. The following day, Parrott – the senior naval officer of Charleston – sent Planter to Port Royal where Du Pont took her into the Union Navy.

On the night of 24–25 May, the inbound steamer Kate dashed past the Union blockaders off Charleston but ran ashore under the protection of Confederate guns. In the morning, Augusta and Pocahontas tried to destroy the blockade runner by gunfire; but heavy seas and fire from Southern shore batteries prevented their succeeding. During the half-hour the Union ships were under fire, Confederate shells passed overhead and between Augusta and Pocahontas but none scored. On the other hand, although raised to their maximum elevation, the Union guns were unable to reach shore. This failure dramatically demonstrated Augusta's need for heavier guns.

The following day, Augusta and Huron chased a runner named Cambria. Huron captured that steamer which had departed Nassau, cleared for Saint John, New Brunswick, but was obviously headed for Charleston.

On 18 June, Du Pont ordered Parrott to move to Wassau Sound where Augusta labored to close that approach to Savannah until Flag relieved her at the end of the first week of July. Parrott then took his ship back to Charleston and by mid-month was again the senior officer blockading that strategic port.

But her hard service had taken a toll on Augusta and had been especially hard on her engines. On 5 August, Lieutenant Daniel Ammen – who had recently participated in a survey of the ship – felt that repairing her might well cost more than constructing a new ship. Instead of repairing her, he suggested that her bow be reinforced so that she could be used as a ram to destroy Atlanta, a Southern ironclad ram at Savannah. This recommendation was not followed – probably because the Union Navy still needed more warships for blockade duty, and because Augusta.had established a wide reputation for her outstanding sea-keeping ability. Instead, on 27 August, Du Pont sent her North for repairs. In his orders to Parrott, Du Pont – now an acting rear admiral – expressed his "... very sincere approbation and appreciation of the services rendered by Augusta on this station. He went on to point out that "... no vessel has seen more outside blockade service and has been less in port, and whose fires have been so seldom drawn."

Two days later, Augusta – towing Seneca – departed Port Royal. Upon her arrival at Philadelphia on 3 September, Parrott commented, "The Augusta is the best sea boat I have ever seen; is fast, and, having very little motion, the steadiness of her decks aids very much the accuracy of her fire. I think her well worthy of an improved battery and a thorough outfit." The ship was decommissioned on 17 September, and the Philadelphia Navy Yard gave her a speedy overhaul so that she might get to sea in pursuit of the Confederate commerce raider CSS Alabama which had recently been preying upon Union shipping in the North Atlantic.

Recommissioned on 31 October, Augusta received orders the next day to get underway for a cruise "... via Bermuda and St. Thomas through the Windward Islands and along the coast of South America ..." to seek out and to destroy Capt. Raphael Semmes' elusive cruiser. However, engine trouble kept her in port and others went out instead.

On 5 November, Augusta was assigned a different mission, convoy duty for a group of transports which were to carry Army troops to the Gulf of Mexico to reinforce those already there under Major General Benjamin F. Butler. Four days later, General Nathaniel Banks received orders to command these troops and upon arrival at New Orleans, to relieve Butler in command of the Department of the Gulf.

When she was finally ready for sea, Augusta proceeded to Hampton Roads and there awaited Banks' transports. The convoy – which was not complete until early in December – sortied from the Virginia Capes on the fourth. While the Union ships were en route south, a fierce storm partially dispersed them; but Augusta managed to remain with most of Banks' transports. This group arrived at Ship Island (Mississippi) on 13 December.

After Parrott had delivered his charges, Augusta headed back to the East Coast. At the request of General Banks, she touched, en route, at Havana, Cuba, and at Key West to inquire about the stray ships of the convoy that had not yet reported. She also replenished her coal bunkers at the latter port; but, before she could resume her voyage to Port Royal to rejoin her squadron, she received new orders from Rear Admiral Theodoras Bailey.

On 22 December, Cornelius Vanderbilt's California mail steamer Ariel had steamed into Key West with word that – as she was steaming from New York toward Panama, she had been captured off the coast of Cuba by CSS Alabama and had been released on ransom. Her master had urged that the Navy henceforth escort Ariel and her sister mail steamers, especially those heading north from the isthmus with shipments of bullion from the California gold fields. On Christmas Day, Bailey directed Parrott to proceed to Aspinwall and to offer convoy or such other assistance to such steamers as may be necessary.

Augusta got underway immediately and, after completing this important mission, finally reported for duty to Du Pont at Port Royal on 18 January 1863. Following coaling and replenishment, she sailed for Charleston to relieve Rhode Island on blockade duty.

On 29 January, her boat crews joined those of Housatonic in assisting officers of Unadilla in refloating the iron-hulled screw steamer Princess Royal. Unadilla had forced her aground while that blockade runner was attempting to slip into Charleston with a cargo of arms and ammunition as well as an unrecorded number of large rifled naval guns and two powerful steam engines slated to be installed in Southern ironclads then under construction.

In the early morning fog of the last day of January, the Confederate ironclads CSS Chicora and Palmetto State steamed out of Charleston and attacked the Union blockading fleet. Palmetto State rammed and fired into Mercedita, reducing that Federal screw gunboat to "... a sinking and perfectly defenseless condition." Meanwhile, Chicora engaged Keystone State. One round burst the Northern side-wheeler's boiler, releasing scalding steam which killed one officer and 19 men and disabled another score of bluejackets.

When the Southern warships first emerged, Augusta was "... lying off the Swash Channel and saw flashes to the southward and westward and heard a few reports." Since gunfire at night was not unusual, Parrott concluded that some vessel was probably attempting to run the blockade. He followed longstanding instructions and kept Augusta on station, on the lookout.

At the first sign of dawn, Quaker City, next in line to the southward of Augusta, got underway and began firing. Parrott soon saw black smoke rising in the direction of the action, signaled the senior officer present – in Housatonic, next in line to the northward – that an enemy was present, and stood to the southward. A short while later, the two Southern ironclads passed successively between Augusta and the shore. During the exchange of fire, a nine-inch Southern shell entered Augusta's starboard side, passed just above her boiler, and lodged in her port side. Housatonic and Memphis also engaged the Confederate ironclads before the secessionist warships retired into the entrance to Maffitt's Channel.

But for occasional short runs to Port Royal to replenish her provisions and to refill her coal bunkers or to tow vessels to other points within the limits of her squadron, Augusta labored into the summer to tighten the blockade of Charleston during the ensuing months. Then, on 5 July, Du Pont – who was to be relieved of command of the South Atlantic Blockading Squadron by Rear Admiral John A. Dahlgren – ordered Parrott "... to prepare the Augusta for sea, as I propose to go to the Delaware in your vessel." The transfer of command took place the next day on board the Wabash and, once Du Pont had embarked in Augusta, she sailed for the Delaware Capes. After dropping off her former squadron commander at New Castle, the steamer proceeded upstream and arrived at the Philadelphia Navy Yard on 10 July.

The next day, Secretary of the Navy Gideon Welles wired Commodore Cornelius Stribling, the commandant of the Philadelphia Navy Yard, orders for Augusta "... to make a cruise to the fishing banks ..." CSS Florida – commanded by Cdr. John N. Maffitt – had recently been terrorizing Union shipping in the North Atlantic, and Augusta was sent out to join in the hunt for that Confederate commerce raider. As soon as she had finished coaling, the Union steamer put to sea and spent the rest of the month looking in vain for Florida. His inquiries of vessels and at visited ports prompted Parrott to conclude that the Southern cruiser had left the northwestern Atlantic more than a fortnight before. Welles was also convinced that Maffitt had sought warmer waters. As a result, soon after she arrived at the New York Navy Yard on the last day of July, Augusta was decommissioned for the long overdue complete overhaul that had first been interrupted by CSS Alabama's antics in the North Atlantic some nine months before.

The veteran steamer was not again ready for action until the following spring, and she was recommissioned on 12 May 1864, Cdr. Thomas G. Corbin in command. Assigned to the North Atlantic Blockading Squadron, she arrived at Hampton Roads on the evening of 4 June. Following brief blockade duty off Wilmington, North Carolina, she returned to Hampton Roads to prepare to escort the monitor Tecumseh to the Gulf of Mexico for Adm. Farragut's forthcoming attack on Mobile Bay. She, Eutaw, and the ill-fated monitor departed Hampton Roads on 5 July. The decision to send two escorts to tow Tecumseh proved to be a wise one, since all three ships suffered engine trouble during the voyage; but, by helping each other, the trio finally reached Pensacola on 28 July.

Augusta remained at that port undergoing repairs to her machinery while the monitor moved to Mobile Bay to participate in the historic battle on 5 August which brought her short career to a tragic close. When the yard work was finished, the steamer sailed north on 3 September and arrived back at Hampton Roads on 12 September and she entered the Norfolk Navy Yard to have her hull scraped before resuming duty. She returned to service in October and was assigned to the squadron's third division.

However, before the month ended, engine trouble forced Augusta to New York for repairs. Before this work could be accomplished, the Navy Department became aware of renewed and intensified threats to the security of the California mail steamers from Confederate cruisers and from groups of Southern passengers who were plotting to seize these ships. To help in countering these dangers, Augusta – the only vessel available at New York for convoy duty – departed that port on the morning of 6 November in the wake of North Star, about two and one-half days after that steamer had sailed for Panama. Upon reaching Panama Augusta was to escort North Star back home. She arrived at Aspinwall on the morning of 16 November and, two days later, followed her charge out to sea. With great difficulty, she managed to keep North Star in sight for over three days; but, on the evening of 21 November, a loud and vibrant thump developed in her engine. She followed North Star to the Bahamas: and both ships stopped at Mathew Town, Great Inagua, in that island group. There, engineers inspected Augusta's machinery and confirmed that the piston rod was loose. Nevertheless, the commanding officers of the vessels decided to proceed north. About an hour after midnight on 25 November, the loose piston and rod separated with a violent concussion. The failure irreparably cracked the cylinder, utterly disabling Augusta's engine.

North Star towed her escort to Port Royal, South Carolina, where the two ships arrived on 28 November, and then proceeded on north alone. Cdr. Corbin was unable to arrange for a tow until the afternoon of 8 December when the Army transport Arago undertook the task. Bad weather plagued both ships as they fought their way northward, but they reached Hampton Roads safely on the evening of 12 December. There, General Butler forbade the master of the Arago to continue towing Augusta to New York, probably because he felt that she would be needed in the impending attack upon Fort Fisher. Somehow, Cdr. Corbin managed to arrange for a vessel which towed his ship to Baltimore. After she finally reached that port, Augusta was decommissioned on 6 January 1865.

== Political operations ==
Despite the seriousness of the ship's damage, the Navy decided to keep Augusta because of her outstanding sea-keeping qualities. Nevertheless, the fighting had ended before the steamer was again ready for service. By that time, the Government was cutting the Fleet back to peacetime size, so the ship remained in reserve until the spring of 1866, a year after the collapse of the Confederacy.

Augusta was recommissioned at the Washington Navy Yard on 2 April 1866, Cdr. Alexander Murray in command. A fortnight later, she received orders to proceed to New York; and she arrived at the New York Navy Yard on 23 April. On 5 May, she stood out into the Atlantic in company with the double-turreted monitor Miantonomoh and the side-wheel, double-ended gunboat Ashuelot. Two days later, Ashuelot left the group and set course for Boston where she embarked Gustavus Vasa Fox, the Assistant Secretary of the Navy. Augusta and the monitor arrived at Halifax, Nova Scotia on 10 May and there, Murray later reported, received ". . . the first flow of that tide of visitors which, wherever we went, overwhelmed us." Underway again on 18 May, the two ships arrived at St. John's, Newfoundland on 24 May. Ashuelot rejoined the group there on 3 June.

The cruise the three ships were about to begin was undertaken to serve several purposes. First, it carried Mr. Fox to Russia as President Andrew Johnson's personal representative and as the bearer of a resolution of Congress congratulating Tsar Alexander II for his escape from the attack of a nihilist assassin. The United States also wished to express to the Tsar its appreciation for Russia's warm – albeit unofficial – support of the Union cause during the Civil War, especially of the Russian Fleet's friendly visit to Union controlled waters during the conflict.

Secondly, the cruise was made to show the world's naval powers the Nation's innovation in warship design, the monitor, and to demonstrate its ability to operate in the open sea. Finally, the operation was an effort to cultivate friendly relations with all of the nations visited – an early example of the Navy's "show-the-flag" policy.

The flotilla departed St. John's on 5 June and reached Queenstown, Ireland on 16 June. Ashuelot parted from the group at that port. The two remaining warships headed for England on 21 June; and, during the ensuing year visited most of the maritime countries of Europe and, in every case, received enthusiastically friendly hospitality from royalty and commoners alike. The highlight of the cruise was the visit to Russia which began upon the warships' arrival at Helsingfors (Helsinki) on 3 August. Finland was then an autonomous duchy owing allegiance to the Tsar. Three days later, the pair reached Kronstadt, the port serving St. Petersburg and the Americans, home-away-from-home for more than a month in which they enjoyed the warmest of welcomes. The Tsar and members of the Russian royal family visited the ships on 9 August. Lavish entertainment on board the royal yacht, sightseeing tours, and an inspection of the Russian Fleet filled the ensuing days until Augusta and Miantonomoh got underway again on 15 September and headed for Stockholm.

Besides their four days in Sweden, the Americans visited Germany – including the port of Kiel in the King of Prussia's newly acquired province of Schleswig-Holstein-France, Portugal, and Spain before they transited the Strait of Gibraltar two days before Christmas. They welcomed in the new year, 1867, at Málaga, Spain, and spent the next four and one-half months visiting the traditionally popular ports of call in the Mediterranean before departing Gibraltar on 15 May and heading home, via the Canary Islands, the Cape Verdes, Barbados, and the Bahamas. Following a week at Nassau, they began the final passage of the cruise on 17 July and moored in the Philadelphia Navy Yard on the 22nd. Soon thereafter, Augusta was laid up in the New York Navy Yard and remained there until sold at auction on 2 December 1868 to "Commodore" Cornelius Kingsland Garrison.

== Civilian operations ==
Redocumented as Magnolia on 23 December, the steamer was completely reconditioned and then operated out of New York to Charleston and Florida ports. In 1872, Garrison sold her to the Central Georgia Railway and Banking Co. for whom she continued to operate on the same route. Two years later, this corporation organized the Ocean Steamship Company as a subsidiary and gave the new firm all of its ships including Magnolia.

On 27 September 1877, Magnolia departed Savannah and headed for New York. Two days out, a severe storm arose imperiling the ship. Before dawn the next morning, the vessel began taking on water faster than her pumps could expel it. Soon the engine room floor collapsed and, by 8:00 a.m., rising water put out the boiler's fires. After a futile struggle to pump out and bail out the ship, the master ordered the crew to abandon ship. No one was lost or injured in the sinking. The Magnolia has never been found.
