= USS Unadilla (1861) =

Gunboat of the United States Navy

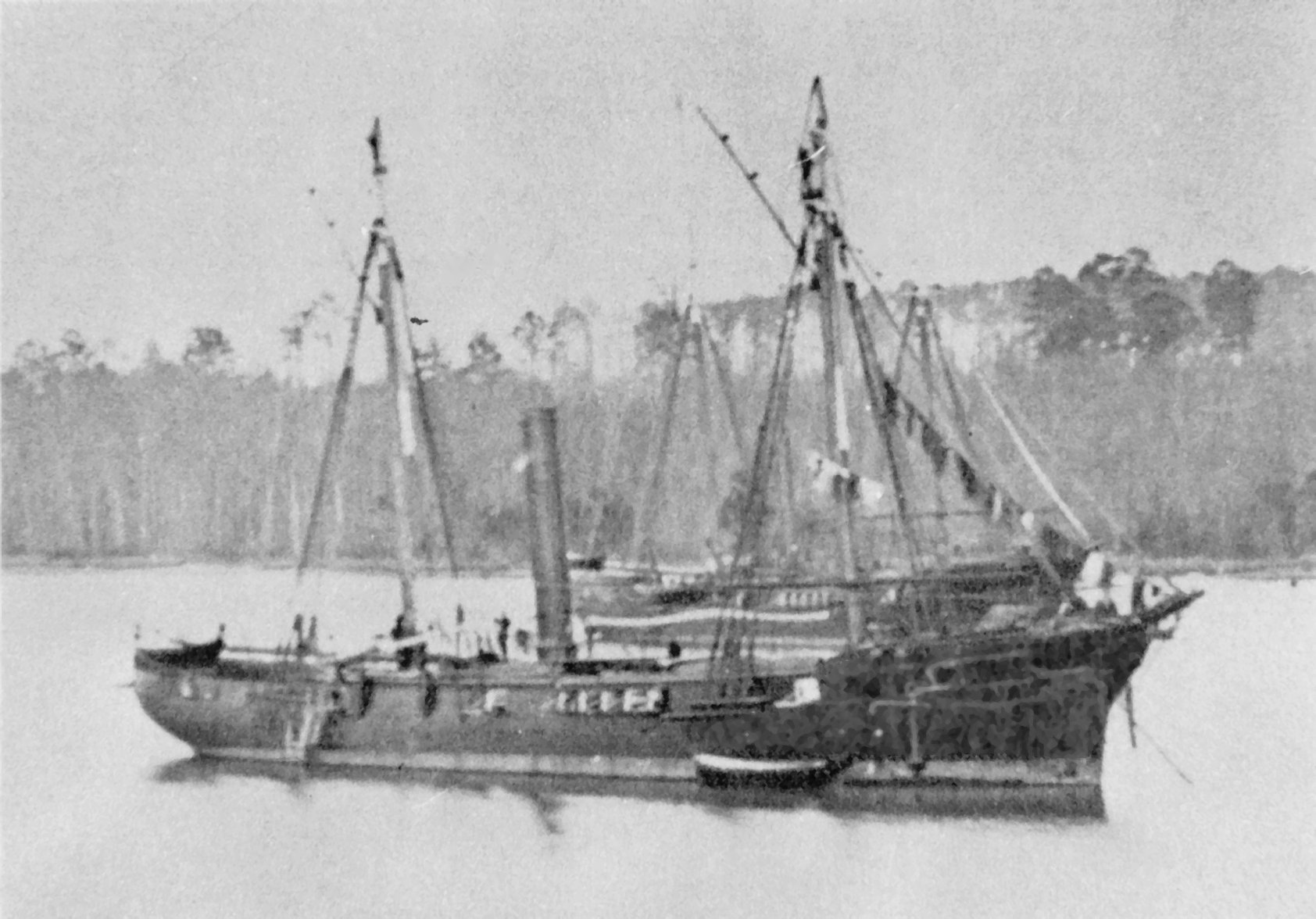
- USS Unadilla (foreground) and another Unadilla-class vessel during the Civil War, location unknown

History

United States
- Name: Unadilla
- Namesake: Unadilla River, NY
- Launched: 17 August 1861
- Commissioned: 30 September 1861
- Decommissioned: 4 May 1865
- In service: 20 December 1866
- Out of service: 1869
- Stricken: 1869 (est.)
- Fate: Sold, 9 November 1869

General characteristics
- Class & type: Unadilla-class gunboat
- Displacement: 691 tons
- Tons burthen: 507
- Length: 158 ft (48 m) (waterline)
- Beam: 28 ft (8.5 m)
- Draft: 9 ft 6 in (2.90 m) (max.)
- Depth of hold: 12 ft (3.7 m)
- Propulsion: 2 × 200 IHP 30-in bore by 18 in stroke horizontal back-acting engines; single screw
- Sail plan: Two-masted schooner
- Speed: 10 kn (11.5 mph)
- Complement: 114
- Armament: Original: 1 × 11-in Dahlgren smoothbore; 2 × 24-pdr smoothbore; 2 × 20-pdr Parrott rifle

USS Unadilla was a Unadilla-class gunboat built for service with the United States Navy during the American Civil War. She was the lead ship in her class.

Unadilla was used by the Navy to patrol navigable waterways of the Confederacy to prevent the South from trading with other countries.

== Built in New York City in 1861 ==
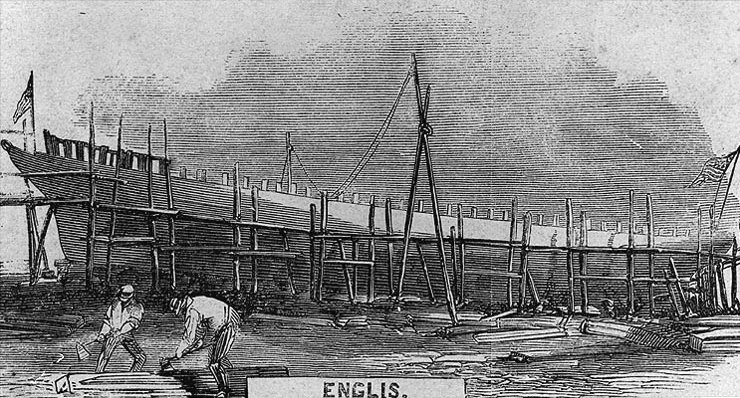
USS Unadilla under construction at the yard of John Englis, New York

Unadilla, a screw gunboat, was laid down at New York City by John Englis and the Novelty Iron Works in the late spring of 1861; launched on 17 August; and commissioned at the New York Navy Yard on 30 September, Lt. Napoleon Collins in command. The vessel was one of 23 "90 Day" gunboats hurriedly constructed in less than three months shortly after the outbreak of the Civil War in April 1861.

== Civil War operations ==
=== Assigned to the South Atlantic Blockade ===
In October 1861, Unadilla joined the South Atlantic Blockading Squadron under Rear Admiral Samuel F. Du Pont and participated in the capture of Fort Walker and Fort Beauregard in Port Royal Sound, South Carolina, on 7 November. During the bombardment, the gunboat was struck six times but suffered no casualties and sustained minor damage to her hull and rigging. Control of Port Royal Sound enabled the Union Navy to coordinate the blockade of the southern Atlantic seacoast more effectively for the duration of the war.

On 10 November, Lt. Collins in Unadilla assumed command of Union naval forces off Beaufort, South Carolina, for the purpose of restoring order to the town following its capture two days before. Unadilla and Pembina next proceeded to Saint Helena Sound, South Carolina, on 24 November to reconnoiter Confederate positions at Hunting Island, Otter Island, and at the mouths of the Morgan and Coosaw rivers. The two gunboats conducted a survey up the Ashepoo River on 27 November. Unadilla returned to the Ashepoo on 6 December, but her engines failed, forcing the vessel back to Port Royal under tow on 9 December.

In January 1862, Unadilla joined Pembina on patrol in Wright's River, South Carolina. On 28 January, the gunboats fired upon and drove back two Confederate steamers attempting to reach Ft. Pulaski, Georgia, and damaged three others. Unadilla remained in Wright's River through April, making several reconnaissance expeditions up both the Wright's and New rivers in March and investigating rumors that the Confederates were building a large ironclad warship at Savannah, Georgia. She was temporarily deployed in the Savannah River, Georgia, in mid-April and, on 24 April, received orders to return to Port Royal.

=== Unadilla assigned to blockade duty off Charleston, South Carolina ===
Unadilla left Port Royal for blockade duty off Charleston, South Carolina, on 28 April. On 10 May, she caught the English schooner Mary Teresa attempting to run into Charleston with a cargo of salt and assorted merchandise. Unadilla delivered the schooner's two passengers to the authorities and sent the vessel north to the New York prize court; then on 20 and 21 May, she joined Pembina, Ottawa, and the surveying steamer Bibb in Stono Inlet, South Carolina, where the Union flotilla captured six armed Confederates.

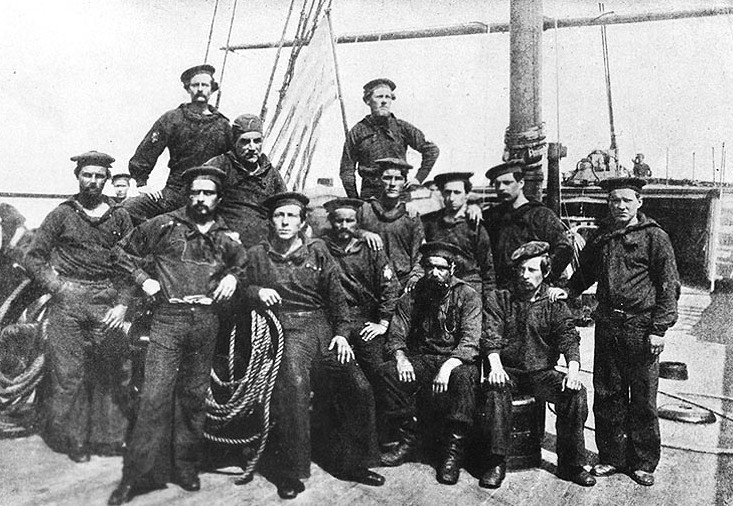
USS Unadilla crew members pose by the ship's Dahlgren XI-inch pivot gun, during the Civil War.

On a second inspection of Stono Inlet and Stono River on 29 May, the vessels found the river free from Confederate obstructions and floating batteries, making it possible for Federal troops to cross in safety. Unadilla remained on duty in the Stono River until 4 July, when she returned to Port Royal to help repulse a Confederate attack upon Port Royal Island.

Unadilla left Port Royal on 12 July for reconnaissance duty in Ossabow Sound, Georgia, and its tributaries. There, during an exploratory expedition up the Ogeechee River on 29 July, Unadilla, Huron, and Madgie exchanged heavy gunfire with Confederate Fort McAllister for over an hour before retiring down the stream.

On 4 August, while patrolling between the Ogeechee and Vernon rivers in Ossabow Sound, Unadilla captured the British blockade-running steamer Lodona and her cargo of foodstuffs, dry goods, and building materials. The gunboat returned to New York for repairs on 19 August.

=== Unadilla intercepts and captures material for Southern ironclads ===
When she was again ready for action, Unadilla resumed reconnaissance duty in the rivers and inlets of the South Carolina and Georgia coasts. She sailed to Port Royal from the North Edisto River, South Carolina, in late December for repairs and supplies, and then joined the blockading force off Charleston on 20 December 1862. There, Unadilla captured the screw steamer Princess Royal on 29 January 1863 after chasing the blockade runner aground. Princess Royal proved to be a rich catch, as she was laden with rifled guns, small arms, ammunition, and two powerful steam engines intended for ironclads. She was a valuable vessel herself and was later taken into the Union Navy.

Unadilla ended the month by helping the Fleet to beat back an attempt to raise the blockade made during the foggy early morning hours of 31 January by the newly completed Confederate rams CSS Chicora and CSS Palmetto State. Before they were repulsed, the two ironclads largely destroyed both Mercedita and Keystone State, killing one quarter of the crew of theKeystone State. The near success of the attack prompted Confederate General P.G.T. Beauregard to exuberantly, and erroneously, proclaim the blockade of Charleston lifted.

=== Unadilla supports the failed attempt to capture Charleston ports ===
Unadilla left the blockade off Charleston on 6 February to join with USS Commodore McDonough for reconnaissance activity in Stono Inlet and Stono River. In addition to routine patrol duties, Commodore McDonough, Unadilla and Pawnee entered the Kiawah River, South Carolina, on 28 February to ascertain if it were possible for the Confederates to install batteries on John's Island, but found that it was not.

On 14 March, Unadilla received orders to return to the Charleston blockade to counter increased blockade running activity. There, the gunboat served with the reserve force during Rear Admiral Du Font's monitor attack upon the strong Confederate forts in Charleston harbor on 7 April. However, the Southern defenders put up such a vigorous defense that the Union fleet was compelled to disengage. Reporting on the action, Rear Admiral Du Pont commented that to continue the attack "would have converted a failure into a disaster."

=== The war takes a toll on the busy ship ===
Shortly after the attack, Unadilla returned to her previous duty station in the Stono Inlet where she engaged a Confederate floating battery on 25 May. She remained there a month before being ordered to proceed to the command of the blockade off Wassaw Sound, Georgia, on 24 June. She put into Port Royal for repairs in August and returned to Wassaw Sound in September. From her post off Tybee Island, Georgia, the gunboat conducted frequent reconnaissance surveys and reported upon both suspected Confederate troop movements in the area and the construction and movements of the ram CSS Savannah.

In January 1864, she underwent repairs at Port Royal and, in March, was dispatched to St. Johns River, Florida, for reconnaissance and convoy duties. After striking a sand bar, Unadilla returned to Port Royal in May where carpenters discovered that the battle-weary vessel needed an extensive overhaul. Unadilla was detained briefly in Ossabow Sound but, on 19 June, finally received orders north to the Philadelphia Navy Yard.

=== After repairs, she is assigned to the North Atlantic Blockade ===
Repairs completed, Unadilla departed Philadelphia, Pennsylvania, on 22 October, bound for Hampton Roads, Virginia, and duty with Rear Admiral David Dixon Porter's North Atlantic Blockading Squadron. On 22 November, she was dispatched to the blockade off New Inlet, North Carolina.

She next served with the blockade off Wilmington, North Carolina, and Beaufort, North Carolina, in early December and participated in the unsuccessful first amphibious assault upon Confederate Fort Fisher in the Cape Fear River, North Carolina, on 24 and 25 December. The fleet returned two weeks later and took the fort during a second amphibious assault between 13 and 15 January 1865. The Union vessels continued up the Cape Fear River toward Wilmington, and Unadilla assisted in the attack and capture of Fort Anderson on 18 February.

On 23 February, she was ordered to proceed to Hampton Roads and served in the James River, Virginia, squadron doing routine reconnaissance work until the end of the war.

== Reassigned post-war to suppress Chinese pirates and visit King of Siam ==
Unadilla was decommissioned at the New York Navy Yard on 4 May 1865 but was recommissioned on 20 December 1866 for duty with Rear Admiral Henry H. Bell's Asiatic Squadron in 1867, primarily for use in the suppression of Chinese pirates, Unadilla, together with Aroostook, Maumee, and assorted small gunboats of other nations, was credited with stopping most of the pirate depredations by 1868.

The gunboat also visited Bangkok in June 1868 to deliver arms and exchange diplomatic pleasantries with the King of Siam and his ministers. Soon thereafter, Unadilla was condemned as being too unseaworthy to be sent safely back to the United States and was sold on station on 9 November 1869.

== See also ==
- Battle of Fort Pulaski
