= John Randolph Tucker (naval officer) =

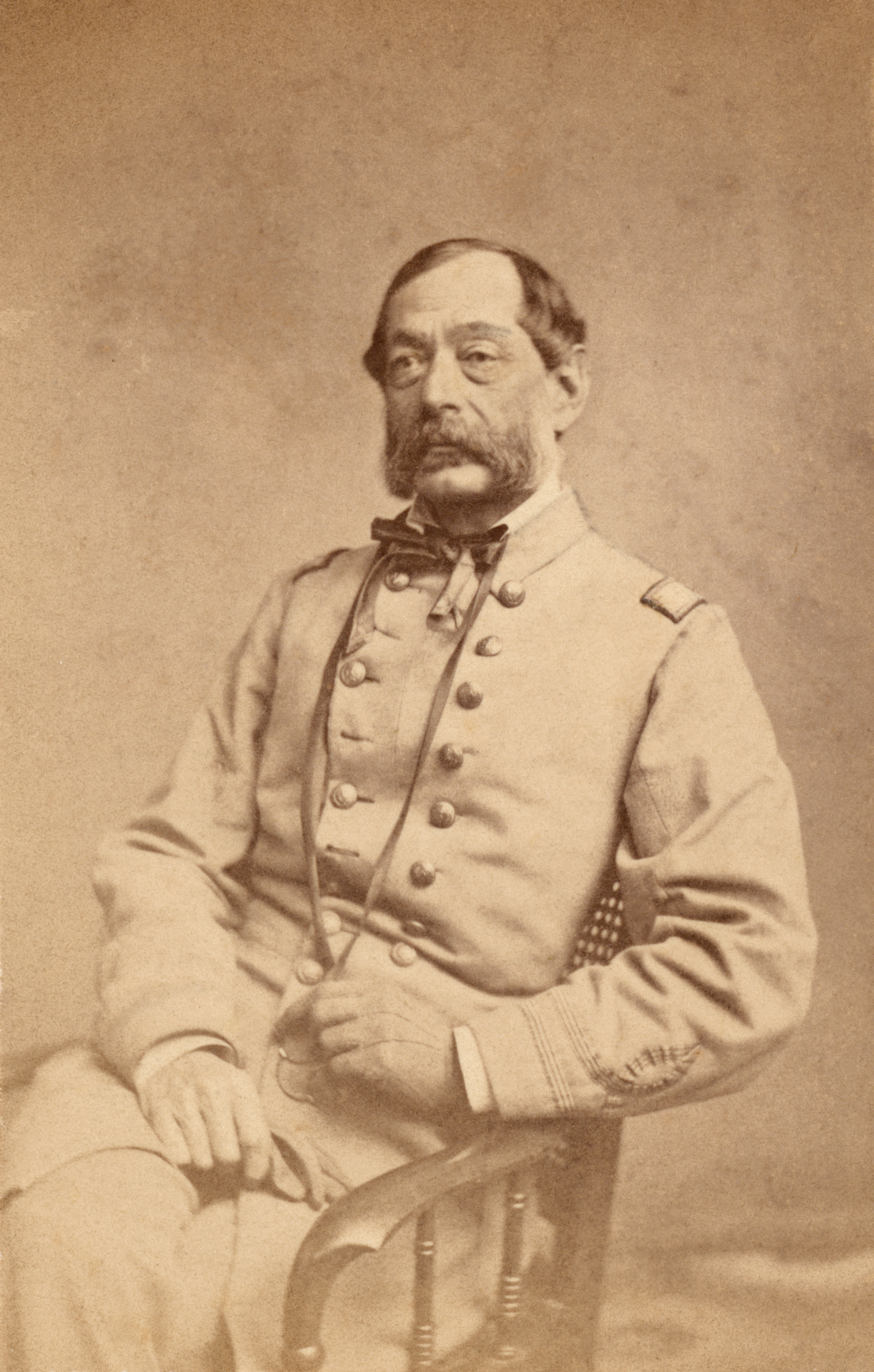
- Born: January 31, 1812; Alexandria, Virginia, U.S.
- Died: June 12, 1883 (aged 71); Petersburg, Virginia, U.S.
- Military career
- Allegiance: United States of America; Virginia; Confederate States of America; Peru
- Branch: United States Navy; Virginia Naval Militia; Confederate States Navy; Peruvian Navy
- Service years: 1826–1861 (USN); 1861 (Virginia Navy); 1861–1865 (CSN); 1866–1871 (Peruvian Navy)
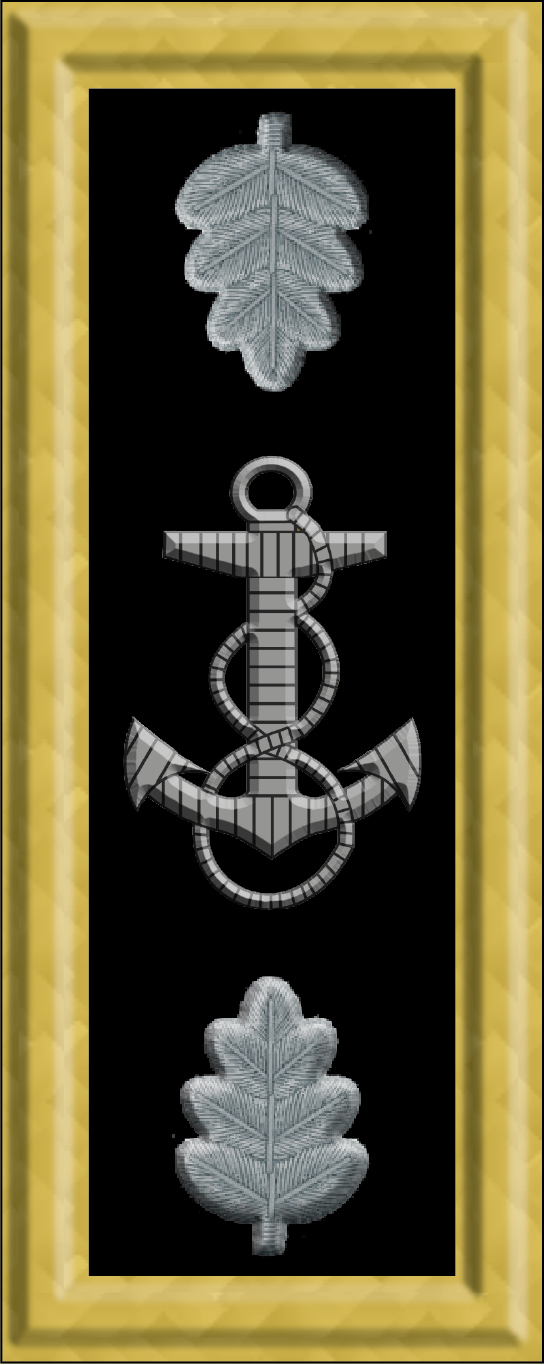
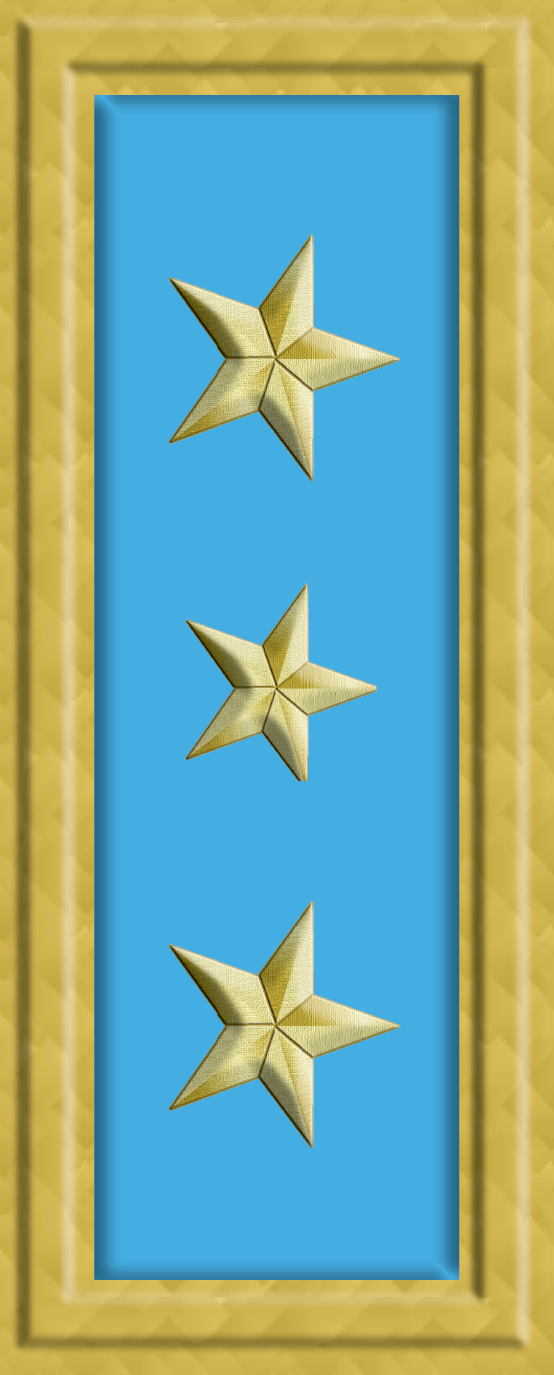
- Rank: Commander (USN) Captain (CSN); Rear Admiral (Peruvian Navy)
- Conflicts: American Civil War: Battle of Hampton Roads; Chincha Islands War

John Randolph Tucker (January 31, 1812 – June 12, 1883), was an American naval officer who served in the navies of three nations. He was a commander in the United States Navy, captain in the Confederate States Navy, and rear admiral in the Peruvian Navy. As president of the Peruvian Hydrographic Commission of the Amazon, he contributed to the exploration and mapping of the upper Amazon Basin.

== Early life ==
He was born in Alexandria, Virginia to merchant captain John Tucker, originally from Bermuda, and Susan Douglas, daughter of Dr. Charles Douglas, an English physician.

== United States Navy ==
Tucker became a United States Navy Midshipman on June 1, 1826, at age fourteen, and had service afloat in the Mediterranean and Brazil Squadrons prior to his promotion to Lieutenant on December 20, 1837. During the Mexican–American War, he served as a lieutenant commander in the Gulf of Mexico, commanding USS Stromboli until illness forced him to return north. From 1849 until 1855, he was assigned to the Home Squadron (1849–1852) and Mediterranean Squadron (1852–1855) flagships. Tucker received his commission as commander on September 14, 1855, when he became commanding officer of USS Pennsylvania. He later served as ordnance officer at the Norfolk Navy Yard.

== Confederate States Navy service ==
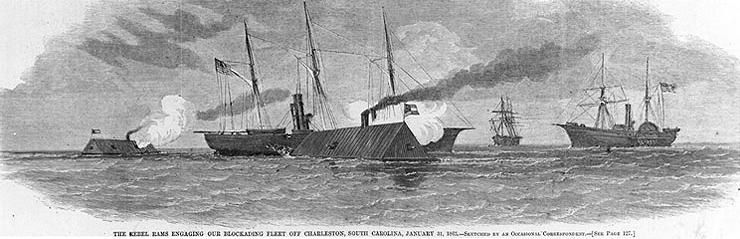
CSS Chicora, with John Randolph Tucker in command, and CSS Palmetto State attacking Union warships in Charleston Harbor, January 31, 1863

Commander Tucker resigned from the U.S. Navy when Virginia seceded from the Union on April 18, 1861, becoming a commander in the Virginia Navy and, in June, the Confederate States Navy. In 1861–62, he was the commanding officer of CSS Patrick Henry, armed with 10 guns and manned by 150 officers and sailors, participating with her in several combat actions, including supporting the ironclad CSS Virginia in the Battle of Hampton Roads. In April 1862 he took command of the James River Squadron, which included the Patrick Henry and Virginia. During the Federal Navy's attack on the Drewry's Bluff fortifications in May 1862, he commanded one of the defending batteries in the Battle of Drewry's Bluff.

In July 1862, Tucker was ordered to Charleston, South Carolina, where he took command of the ironclad CSS Chicora. The following January 31, he led his ship in a successful attack on Union warships off that port engaging several Federal ships, including the USS Keystone State, in a gun battle. He became commander of the Confederate warships at Charleston in March 1863, remaining in that post until the city fell in February 1865. During that time, he was promoted to captain and aggressively pursued spar-torpedo warfare against U.S. warships. He was ordered to scuttle his vessels and retreat to Wilmington, North Carolina after General William T. Sherman with his army came to Charleston. Tucker formed a marine detachment from the crews of ships which became known as Tucker's Marine Brigade.

During the U.S. Civil War's last weeks he served with his men in the defenses of Richmond, Virginia, the Confederate capital, manning Fort Darling on Drewry's Bluff on the James River while the Confederate States Army was facing its final destiny at Appomattox, Virginia. He surrendered in the field on April 6, 1865, at the Battle of Sailor's Creek, southwest of Petersburg, and remained a prisoner of war until July 24. After his release, he returned to the South to work as an agent of the Southern Express Company of Raleigh, North Carolina.

== Peruvian Navy ==
In 1866, the Peruvian Minister to the United States contacted Tucker to arrange an interview in Washington, D.C. At that time, Peru and Chile were in the Chincha Islands War with Spain, and the Peruvian President, General Mariano Ignacio Prado, invited Tucker to join their Navy as a rear admiral, bringing with him two staff officers of his choice. Prado planned for Tucker to lead the allied fleet of Peru and Chile against the Spanish, leading a campaign against the Philippines. Tucker accepted the position and went to Peru with Captain David Porter McCorkle and Commander Walter Raleigh Butt. After arriving at Valparaíso, Chile, Tucker raised his flag on board the Peruvian armored frigate Independencia.

Although some Peruvian naval officers objected to a foreigner in command of their fleet, Tucker did his best to raise the battle preparedness of the combined navies of Peru and Chile. Several Peruvian naval officers, led by Captain Lizardo Montero, felt insulted at such a decision since they felt that they had shown they were just as capable as any other officers to lead and win a naval battle and resigned to their command commissions. Among these Manuel Ferreyros, Aurelio García y García and also, including Miguel Grau Seminario, later known as "the Knight of the Seas" at the War of Guano and Salitre (1879-1883), they all resigned to their commissions due to Tucker's appointment. After the Spanish fleet left South America's Pacific coast, Tucker stepped down as fleet commander but remained a rear admiral because of the support of President Prado.

== Peruvian Hydrographic Commission of the Amazon ==
Tucker resigned from the Peruvian Navy in 1871. He was then appointed president of the Hydrographic Commission of Peru on the Amazon River, which included a group of American and Peruvian naval officers and engineers, James Henry Rochelle, David Porter McCorkle, Walter Raleigh Butt, and Thomas Wing Sparrow, among others. The expedition surveyed the upper Amazon River and its tributaries and discovered two new rivers, the Trinidad and the Herrera-yacu. Tucker traveled to New York upon completion of the expedition to have maps and atlases made and the commission's findings published.

John Randolph Tucker died in his home at Petersburg, Virginia, on June 12, 1883. His remains were interred in Norfolk, Virginia where his wife was already laid to rest after she died in 1858 at age thirty-nine. His collected papers are preserved in the library of Old Dominion University.

== Family ==
On June 7, 1838, Tucker married Virginia Webb, daughter of U.S. Navy captain Thomas Tarleton Webb, and they had nine children.

== See also ==
- Confederate States Navy
- Peruvian Navy

Military offices
Preceded by Josiah Tattnall III	Commander of the James River Squadron; April 19, 1862 - May 1862	Succeeded by Sidney Smith Lee
