= Casemate ironclad =

American Civil War warship type

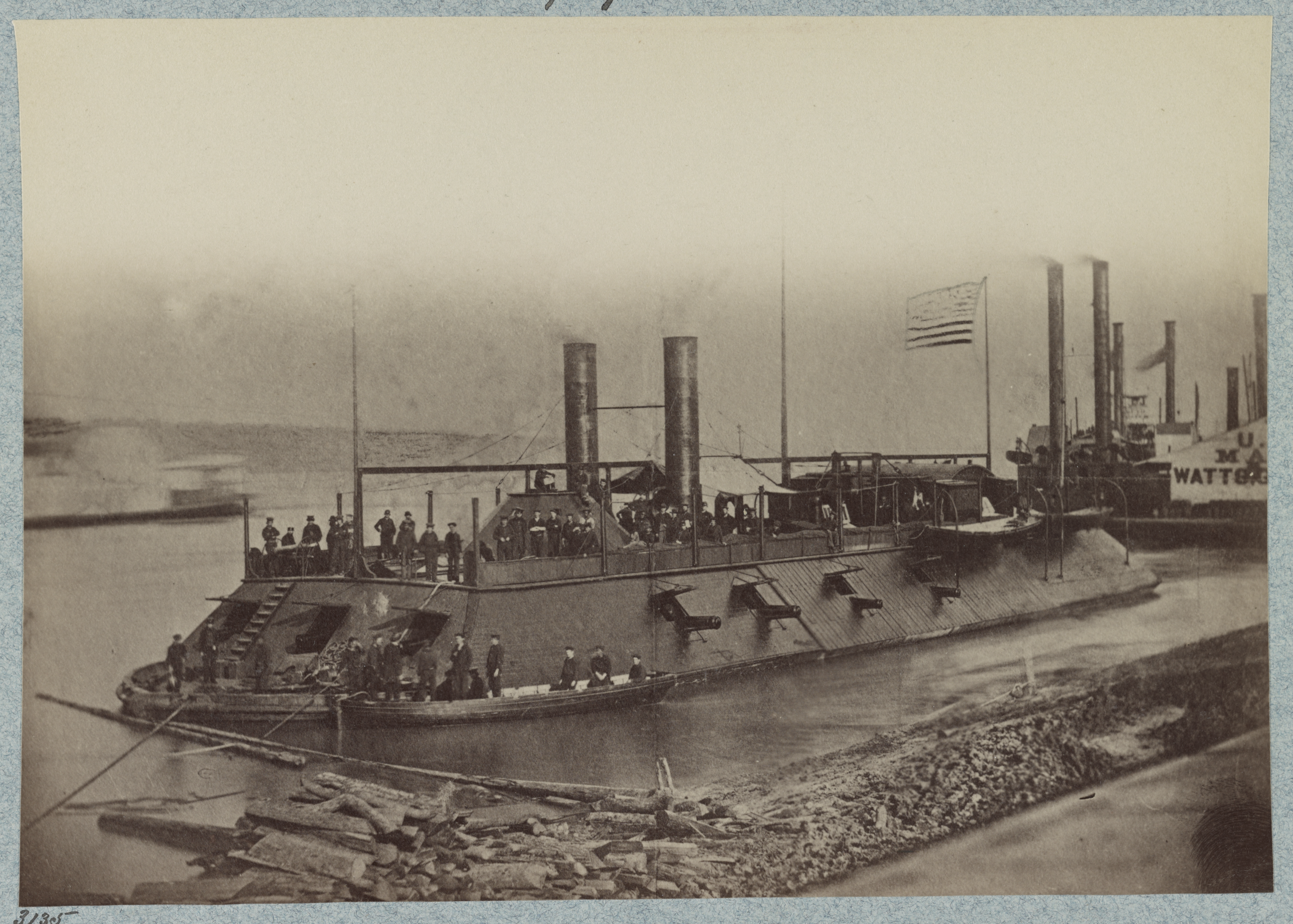
Casemate Ironclad USS Cairo in a contemporary photograph.

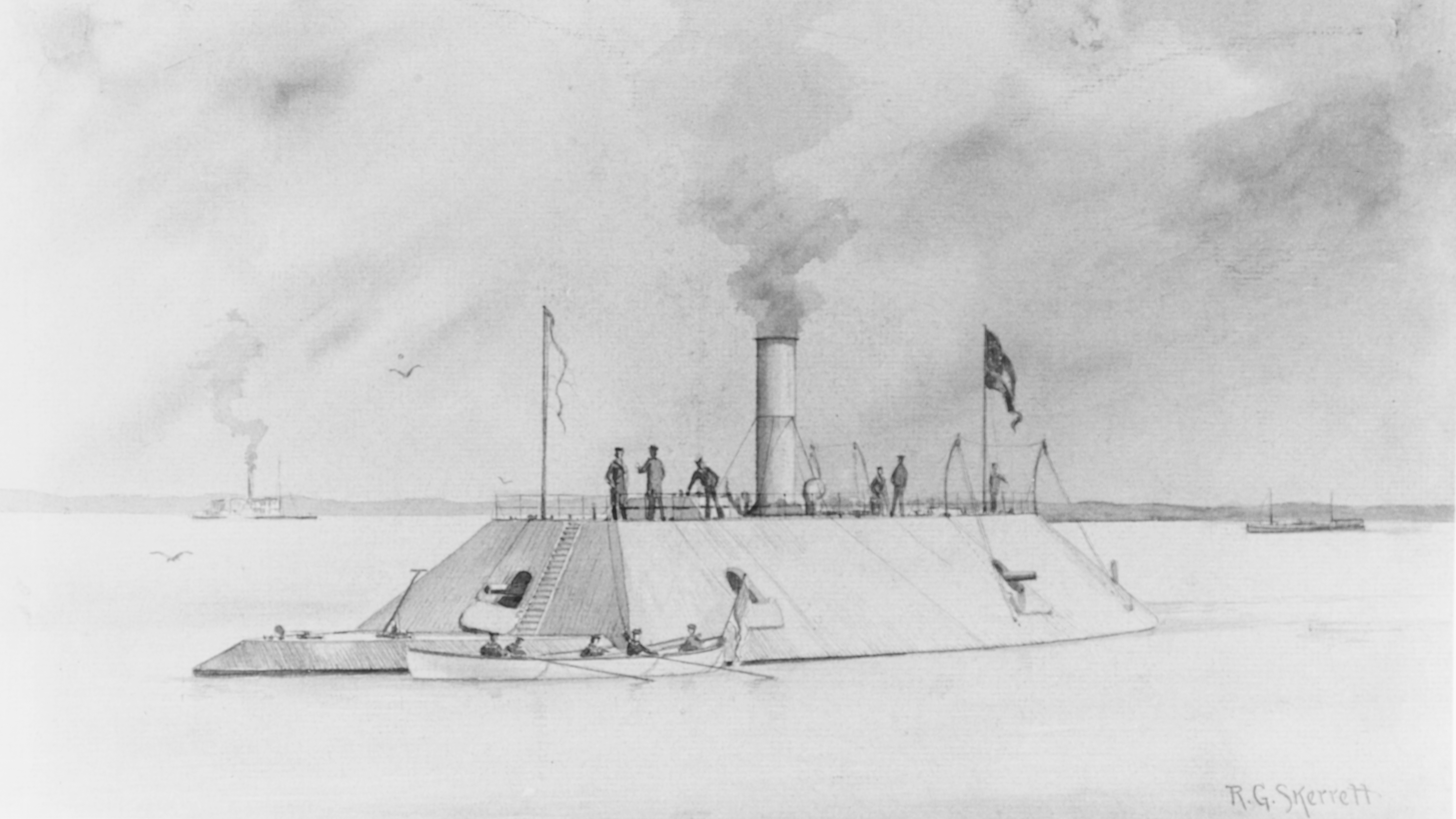
CSS Palmetto State, the archetypal casemate ironclad. Note the sloped deck and the low waterline.

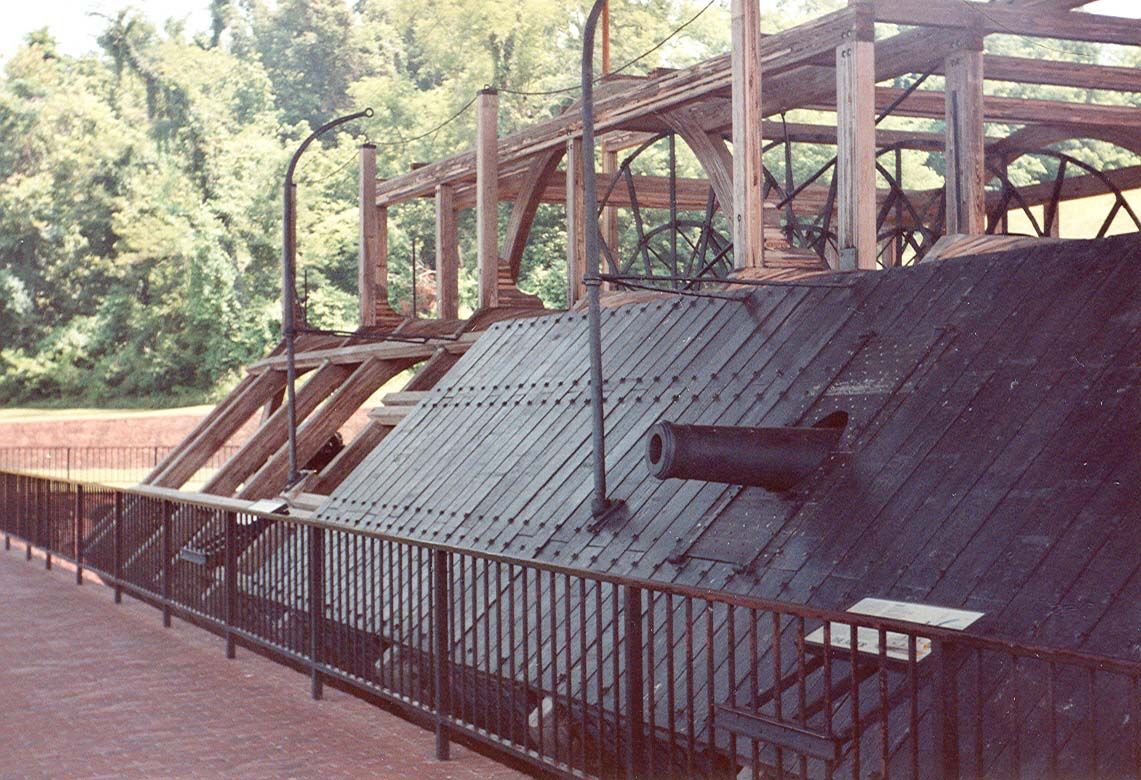
Detail of the remains of USS Cairo as a museum ship today. The sloped casemate deck is clearly visible.

The casemate ironclad was a type of iron or iron-armored gunboat briefly used in the American Civil War by both the Confederate States Navy and the Union Navy. Unlike a monitor-type ironclad which carried its armament encased in a separate armored gun deck/turret, the casemate design exhibited a single (often sloped) structure, or armored citadel, on the main deck housing the entire gun battery. As the guns were carried on the top of the ship yet still fired through fixed gunports, the casemate ironclad is seen as an intermediate stage between the traditional broadside frigate and modern warships. The guns were protected, but had limited maneuverability and range of fire.

== Overview ==
In its general appearance, a casemate ironclad consisted of a low-cut hull with little freeboard, upon which an armored casemate structure was built. This casemate housed anywhere from two to fifteen cannons, most of them in broadside positions as in classical warships. The casemate was heavily armored (later Confederate ironclads had three layers of 2 inches (5.1 cm) steel) over heavy wood backing and was sloped to deflect direct hits (a 35-degree angle quickly becoming standard). Though deflection of the traditional round shot was the primary sloping rationale for ironclad designers, there actually was an added advantage involved, becoming more pertinent in the later stages of the war when armor-penetrating ordnance was developed, especially by the Union Navy which at war's end had developed shells capable of penetrating up to 9.5 inches (24 cm) of perpendicularly placed armor – hence the increase of armor thickness on Confederate ironclads; sloping increased effective armor thickness against armor-piercing ordnance, which was typically fired on a flat trajectory. For example, the later 6 inches (15.2 cm) Confederate armor, sloped at 35 degrees, resulted in a 22 percent increase of effective horizontal armor thickness at 7.33 inches (18.6 cm). However, increasing the slope came at a cost as it meant adding more armor and heavier structural support – and thus more weight – to the casemate, while maintaining the original armor thickness. Armor was also applied to the part of the hull above the waterline. The casemate was often box-shaped, with armor and weight saving octagon shapes appearing in the later stages of the war. From the top of the casemate protruded an armored lookout structure that served as a pilothouse, and one or two smokestacks.

The casemate ironclad being steam driven, either by screws or by paddle-wheels, it did not need sails or masts, although sometimes, when not in combat, temporary pulley-masts, flagpoles, davits, and awnings were added. Inside the casemate, the guns were housed in one continuous deck. Unlike with turret ironclads, the guns had to fire through fixed gunports and therefore aiming was done by moving the gun relative to the gunport. This was labor-intensive and often up to 20 men were needed to load, aim, fire, and clean a gun, and even with this manpower the firing rate was no better than one shot per five minutes.

=== In the Confederate Navy ===
Although the Union successfully used a substantial fleet of casemate ironclad riverboats in their Mississippi and Red River Campaigns, the casemate ironclad is mostly associated with the Confederacy. This is partly due to the Battle of Hampton Roads, in which the Union turreted ironclad USS Monitor and the Confederate casemate ironclad CSS Virginia (sometimes called the Merrimack) dueled, giving rise to the popular notion that "The North had Monitors (predominantly deployed for coastal operations, whereas the unseaworthy Union casemate ironclads were restricted to inland river operations—hence their "brown-water navy" nickname) while the South had (casemate) ironclads". In effect, the Confederacy concentrated its efforts on casemate ironclads as a means to harass the Union blockade of their ports, but this was a choice dictated by available technology and materials rather than by confidence in the possibilities of this type. Since breaking the Union blockade was the primary objective of the Confederacy's casemate ironclads, as outlined in a May 1861 letter from its Secretary of the Navy Stephen Mallory (who was the one who came up with the idea of employing ironclads to offset the numerical superiority of the Union Navy in the first place) to the Confederate House Committee on Naval Affairs, the majority of them were from the outset designed to operate in coastal waters as well as inland waters, and unlike their Union counterparts were, theoretically at least, seaworthy to a limited extent—since they were never expected to venture out onto the high seas. This was exemplified by the fact that most Confederate ironclads were designed with a keeled deep-draft hull, as opposed to the Union shallow-draft flat bottom hulls (also featured on the Confederate river ironclads of which there were also a number built). This came at a cost, however: Confederate coastal ironclads frequently ran aground when operating in inland waters or shallow coastal waters, with more than one being captured by the Union because of it, or were destroyed by their own crews to prevent capture in such circumstances—a fate that befell the CSS Virginia as her draft ultimately prevented her escape some time after the Battle of Hampton Roads.

Furthermore, even the relatively modest aim of limited seaworthiness was rarely achieved, since the Confederacy had to make do with repurposed and underpowered machinery that was originally designed to power wooden vessels, and which was unsuited for powering the now-heavier casemate ironclads, seriously hampering their maneuverability and leading to many grounded Confederate ironclads being unable to free themselves without help. Acutely aware of the fact, the Confederacy's chief naval engineer John L. Porter (co-designer of Virginia, which was likewise powered by her original, wooden frigate engine) had originally envisioned his subsequent casemate ironclad designs to be equipped with superior British-made engines, theoretically giving them a cruising speed of at least ten knots. However, the Union blockade meant that very few such engines reached Confederate naval shipyards, forcing them to do with whatever was on hand (typically, engines stripped from trapped wooden blockade runners), and thus most of their ironclads were not able to surpass a speed of four to six knots at most. As an example, the engines of the first two ironclads of the Charleston Squadron, the CSS Chicora and CSS Palmetto State, were so weak that they were unable to overcome Charleston Harbor's five-knot tides under their own power. The only time both ironclads sortied out of the harbor was on 31 January 1863 in a successful action against the Union Navy, albeit only engaging wooden enemy ships and making use of slack water in the harbor. Having to add heavier armor in the later stages of the war only served to aggravate matters. All this resulted in the Confederate casemate ironclad never quite living up to its full potential, with glimpses of what might have been gleaned from the exploits of such vessels as CSS Virginia herself, CSS Arkansas, CSS Albemarle and CSS Tennessee (1863).

=== Outside North America ===
In their specific outer appearances, i.e. being essentially floating gun batteries encased in armored citadels, albeit powered, the low-freeboard Union and Confederate casemate ironclads were almost uniquely North American. However, the concept of a fixed armored citadel mounted on a warship housing the main armament itself was further explored by European navies in the last third of the 19th century, by the French and British navies in particular, in no small part due to the inspiration gained from the Battle of Hampton Roads. This resulted in larger, high-freeboard ironclad frigates or battleships the British dubbed "centre battery ships" and the French "casemate" or "barbette" (if the citadel was circularly shaped) ships, which were oceangoing, unlike the American originals (excepting the Confederacy's CSS Stonewall, the only Confederate high-freeboard and oceangoing barbette/casemate ironclad, and the Union's rather unusual low-freeboard, but equally oceangoing, casemate ironclad USS Dunderberg). British examples were, among others, HMS Bellerophon (the first such one completed by the British in 1865) and HMS Hercules (1868). French examples included Brasil (casemate, and as the name implies, completed for the Brazilian Navy in 1865, and, when stripped of its masts, sharing a striking side-profile similarity with its Confederate progenitors) and Redoutable (barbette, and the first warship in history to be constructed in steel in 1878, instead of iron).

Two earlier and rarer examples – having more in common with American ironclads – concerned the Peruvian Navy wooden gunboat BAP Loa, which was converted into a Confederate-style casemate ironclad in 1864 and used in a very similar role during the Chincha Islands War. The other example concerned the Royal Dutch Navy ship-of-the-line Zr Ms De Ruyter, whose conversion into an "armoured steam battery" – completed in 1865 – was ordered immediately after the Battle of Hampton Roads, much like the Merrimack's into Virginia, and suffered from the same defects. Still, all admiralties concluded that it was an evolutionary dead-end and that the revolving gun turret was the way to go – the validity of the conclusion being amply hammered home when the revolutionary HMS Dreadnought (1906) entered service, rendering everything that went before obsolete overnight. As a result, by 1910 no navy had any casemate warship left in service.

== Bibliography ==
- Baxter, James Phinney, 3rd (1968). The Introduction of the Ironclad Warship (reprint of the 1933 ed.). Hamden, Connecticut: Archon Books. pp. 398. OCLC 695838727., Book
- Davis, William C. (1975). Duel Between the First Ironclads (Book club ed.). Garden City, New York: Doubleday. p. 201. OCLC 1551282., Book
- Hill, Richard (2002). War at Sea in the Ironclad Age (paperback version of the 2000 first, hardback ed.). London, UK: Cassell. p. 240. ISBN 0304362670.
- Konstam, Angus (2001). Confederate Ironclad 1861-65. Osprey Publishing. p. 48. ISBN 9781841763071.
- Konstam (1), Angus (2002). Hampton Roads 1862: First Clash of the Ironclads. Osprey Publishing. p. 48. ISBN 9781841764108., Book
- Konstam (2), Angus (2002). Union River Ironclad 1861-65. Osprey Publishing. p. 48. ISBN 9781841764443.
- Melton, Maurice (1968). The Confederate Ironclads. South Brunswick, New Jersey: Thomas Yoseloff Ltd. p. 319. OCLC 559832629.
- Preston, Antony (1979). Sea Power: A Modern Illustrated Military History. New York City, New York: Exeter Books. p. 392. ISBN 0896730115.
- Scharf, J. Thomas (1887). History of the Confederate States Navy. New York: Rogers & Sherwood.
