= USS Quaker City =

Gunboat of the United States Navy

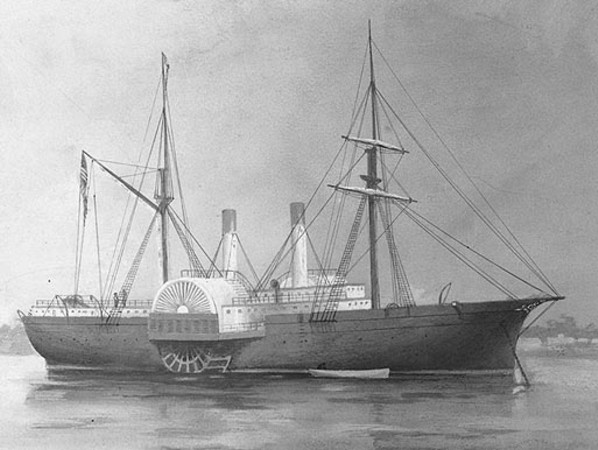
- Wash drawing of USS Quaker City (1861–1865) by Clary Ray, circa 1900.

History

United States
- Name: USS Quaker City
- Namesake: A former name retained.
- Laid down: date unknown
- Launched: 1854
- Acquired: 25 April 1861
- Commissioned: 14 December 1861 at New York City
- Decommissioned: 18 May 1865 at the Philadelphia Navy Yard
- Stricken: 1865 (est.)
- Fate: Sold, 20 June 1865 at Philadelphia, Pennsylvania
- Notes: Continued to serve American commerce until 1869

General characteristics
- Type: Steamship
- Displacement: 1,428 long tons (1,451 t) (burden)
- Length: 244 ft 8 in (74.57 m)
- Beam: 36 ft 0 in (10.97 m)
- Draft: 13 ft 8 in (4.17 m)
- Depth of hold: 29 ft 0.5 in (8.852 m)
- Propulsion: Steam engine, side wheel-propelled
- Speed: 13 kn (15 mph; 24 km/h)
- Complement: 163 officers and enlisted
- Armament: 1 × 20-pounder Parrott rifle, 8 × 32-pounder guns

USS Quaker City was a heavy, 1,428 long tons (1,451 t) sidewheel steamship leased by the Union Navy at the start of the American Civil War. She was subsequently purchased by the navy, outfitted with a powerful 20-pounder long rifle, and assigned to help enforce the Union blockade of the ports of the Confederate States of America.

== Service history ==
Quaker City—a sidewheel steamer built at Philadelphia, Pennsylvania in 1854—was chartered by the navy for 30 days on 25 April 1861 from Hargous & Co., re-chartered for three months on 25 May; purchased on 12 August 1861, and commissioned at New York City on 14 December 1861, Commander James M. Frailey in command. Placed in service only six days after President Abraham Lincoln declared a blockade of the Confederate coast, Quaker City was one of the most active and effective blockaders in the Union Navy. Stationed off the entrance to Chesapeake Bay, she shared in the capture of ship North Carolina on 14 May, of bark Pioneer in Hampton Roads on the 25th, and of bark Winifred off Cape Henry the same day. She captured schooner Lynchburg, carrying coffee in the Chesapeake Bay on 30 May and took bark General Green off Cape Henry on 4 June. Already a veteran, she shared in the capture of Amy Warwick in Hampton Roads on the 10th, took bark Sally Magee there on the 26th, and shared in taking schooner Sally Mears on 1 July. Schooner Fair Wind became her prize on 29 August, and the sidewheeler shared in the capture of steamer Elsie on 4 September. Three days later she sailed north for repairs and to receive a naval crew and organization.

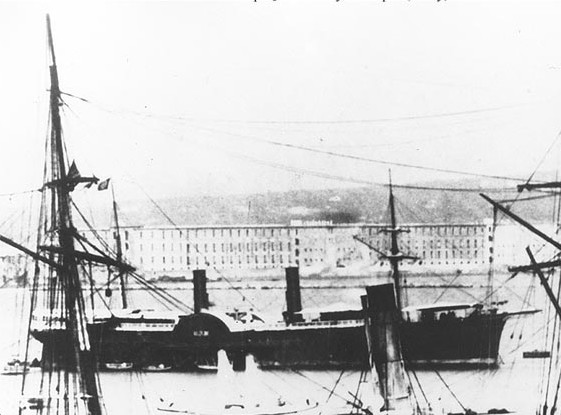
Steamship Quaker City (in the middle distance) at Naples, Italy in 1867. She was USS Quaker City during the Civil War.

Commissioned at New York City on 14 December, Quaker City was detached from the North Atlantic Blockading Squadron to cruise in search of CSS Sumter and turned her attention to hunting Confederate raiders. She captured Model in the Gulf of Mexico on 30 June 1862 and Lilla carrying drugs off Hole-in-Wall, Virginia on 3 July. Four days later, she helped Huntsville take Adela off the Bahamas, and on the 24th blockade runner Orion at Champeche Bank, south of Key West, Florida. Mercury struck to the sidewheeler off Charleston, South Carolina on 4 January 1863, and Quaker City shared in the capture of Princess Royal on the 29th. Two days later she helped fight CSS Chicora and Palmetto State when the Confederate rams attacked the Union squadron in the morning fog off Charleston.

She suffered considerable damage from a shell which entered about seven feet above the water line and exploded in the engine room. This damage and the wear from her hard service took its toll forcing her north for overhaul. Departing Port Royal on 8 March, she took schooner Douro off Wilmington, North Carolina, the following day, heading for Nassau with a cargo of cotton, turpentine, and tobacco. Back in action she picked up 40 bales of cotton at sea on 26 June 1864 and shared in the capture of steamer Elsie off Charleston on 5 September. She participated in the abortive attack on Fort Fisher, North Carolina, on Christmas Eve. Cruising in the Gulf of Mexico, she took schooner R. H. Vermilyea on 12 March 1865, Telemico on the 16th and George Burkhart the next day. Steamer Cora surrendered to her near Brazos Santiago, Texas, on the 24th. She chased CSS Webb as the Confederate steamer attempted to run down the Mississippi River and escape to sea on 24 April.

After the war, Quaker City was decommissioned at the Philadelphia Navy Yard on 18 May and sold at auction there on 20 June. Redocumented on 11 August, Quaker City then served American commerce under U.S. registry. In 1867, she was chartered to carry a group of American travelers on a "package tour" of France, Italy, Greece, Turkey, the "Holy Land", Egypt and Russia, departing 8 June from New York City. Mark Twain was a member of the tour group, sponsored by the newspaper The Daily Alta California, and his humorous letters about the trip became his best-selling book The Innocents Abroad. The steamer was sold and renamed Columbia in 1869; later that year she was acquired by the Haitian Navy and renamed Mont Organisé. Sold again in February 1871, she was renamed République, but was lost at sea off Bermuda later in that month. She was on a voyage from "Le Marc" to New York.
