= David Porter McCorkle =

Confederate Navy officer

David Porter McCorkle was a Confederate Lieutenant in the American Civil War.

He ran the Naval Ordnance Works at New Orleans which also served as a laboratory, principally manufacturing shot and shells, gun carriages for outfitting ships in the Confederate Navy.

In March or April 1862, before the city's capture in the Battle of New Orleans, he removed the ordnance and laboratory stores to Atlanta.

There, he established shops on lots leased from five different parties (leases to expire in May, 1864) and supplied a large number of projectiles until June 4, 1864 when General Joseph E. Johnston ordered him to remove to Augusta, Georgia.

McCorkle wrote to his supervisor, Catesby ap Roger Jones, on June 8:

I am moving the boilers and engines to-day. All the lathes, planes, steam hammer, etc., are already shipped, and, to crown all, they have given an order to move the hospitals, and I can not get cars enough to move.

In November, he was still at work building a foundry and other temporary structures, but was not at that time actually producing ordnance.

After the war, he joined the Peruvian Navy with John Tucker.

Shortly after the end of the Civil War, Peru, which was at war with Spain, invited CSN Admiral J.R. Tucker to join their Navy as a Rear Admiral, bringing with him two staff officers. Tucker accepted and went to Peru with Captain David Porter McCorkle and Commander Walter Raleigh Butt.

Following his resignation in 1871 from the Peruvian Navy, Tucker was appointed President of the Peruvian Hydrographical Commission of the Amazon. This Commission, which included David P. McCorkle, explored and surveyed the Upper Amazon River and its tributaries, discovered two new rivers, the Trinidad and the Herrera-yacu.
