= USS Madgie =

Gunboat of the United States Navy

History

United States
- Laid down: not known
- Launched: 1858
- Acquired: 15 October 1861
- Commissioned: 15 October 1861
- Stricken: 1863
- Fate: Sank 11 October 1863

General characteristics
- Displacement: 220 tons
- Length: 122 ft 6 in (37.34 m)
- Beam: 22 ft 7 in (6.88 m)
- Draught: not known
- Propulsion: steam engine, screw
- Speed: not known
- Complement: not known
- Armament: one 8" gun; one 20-pounder gun

USS Madgie was a steam gunboat acquired by the Union Navy during the American Civil War. She was used by the Navy to patrol navigable waterways of the Confederacy to prevent the South from trading with other countries.

Madgie, a wooden screw steamer, was built at Philadelphia, Pennsylvania, in 1858 and purchased by the Navy at New York City on 15 October 1861 for service in the South Atlantic Blockading Squadron, Acting Master F. B. Meriam in command.

== Service with the South Atlantic Blockade ==
After fitting out, Madgie arrived at Port Royal, South Carolina, 19 April 1862 to patrol southern waters, and steamed off Lawford Channel, Georgia, in May.

She sank a vessel carrying 3,000 barrels of rice off Barrett's Island 20 June, and captured schooner Southern Belle the same day. In July, Madgie joined the blockade of St. Simon's, reconnoitering up Ogeechee River with USS Paul Jones, USS Unadilla, and USS Huron the 24th, engaging Confederate batteries at Fort McAllister. In September Madgie was off Sepolo, Georgia, until ordered to Doboy's Island to relieve USS Western World 30 October.

After repairs at Port Royal in March 1863, Madgie spent the year off St. Catherine's Sound, capturing 15 persons from the steamer Ocanee 21 August.

== Madgie sinks off Frying Pan Shoals ==
Madgie sank in heavy seas in the Atlantic Ocean off Frying Pan Shoals, North Carolina, on 11 October 1863 while under tow by the screw steamer USS Fahkee. At the time of her sinking, her Acting Master was Woodbury H. Polleys of Portland, ME.
