= USS Mercedita =

Gunboat of the United States Navy

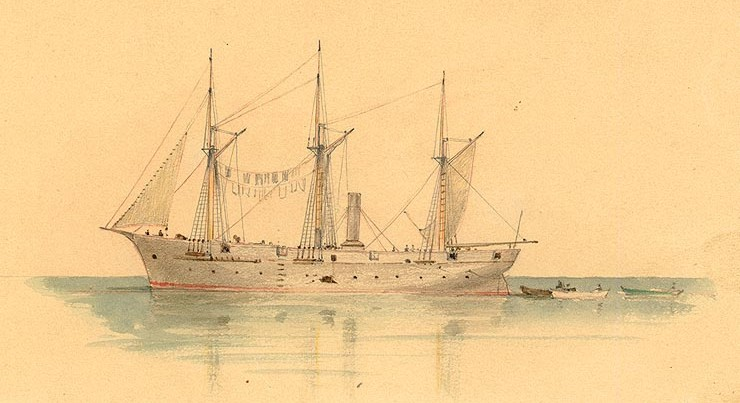
- USS Mercedita

History

United States
- Name: USS Mercedita
- Launched: 1861
- Commissioned: 8 December 1861
- Decommissioned: 14 October 1865
- Fate: Sold, 9 November 1865

General characteristics
- Type: Screw steamer / Gunboat
- Displacement: 1,000 long tons (1,000 t)
- Length: 183 ft 6 in (55.93 m)
- Beam: 30 ft 3 in (9.22 m)
- Draft: 12 ft 9 in (3.89 m)
- Propulsion: Steam engine
- Speed: 11.5 kn (13.2 mph; 21.3 km/h)
- Armament: 8 × 32-pounder guns

USS Mercedita was a wooden steamer that served as a gunboat in the Union Navy during the American Civil War.

== Service history ==
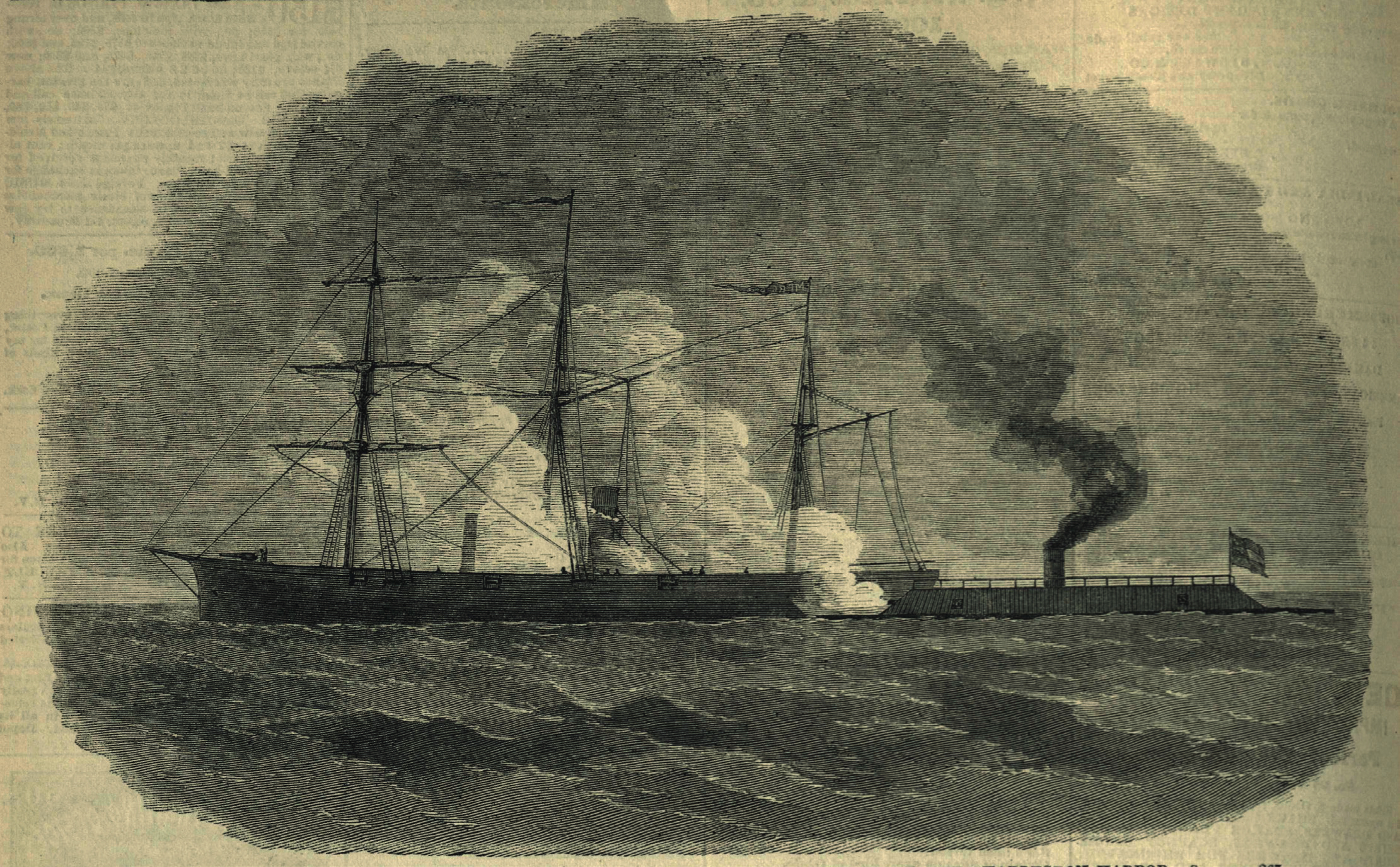
Attack on the U.S. Gunboat Mercedita by the Rebel Ram Palmetto State, off Charleston Harbor. New York Illustrated News

Mercedita was built at Brooklyn, New York in 1861. She was purchased by the Union Navy on 31 July 1861 from J. C. Jewett & Co., and commissioned at New York on 8 December 1861, Commander Henry S. Stellwagen in command.

Mercedita joined the Gulf Blockading Squadron on 3 January 1862, and the next day chased two vessels attempting to run the blockade; Julia and an unidentified ship ran aground trying to escape and were set afire by their crews. Stationed in the Gulf of Mexico near Pass a' l’Outre, Mercedita joined Brooklyn in pursuit of blockade runner Magnolia on 19 February, ultimately capturing her near the entrance to Mobile Bay. However, by both leaving their stations in the pursuit, Mercedita and Brooklyn left Pass a' l’Outre unguarded, allowing Confederate ships Whitmore and Florida to slip through the blockade.

In March, Mercedita was ordered to Apalachicola, Florida to relieve Marion in West Pass. There she destroyed the Confederate batteries at St. Vincent Island, Florida on 21 March. She and Sagamore captured Apalachicola on 3 April. Mercedita captured blockade runner Bermuda on 27 April and schooners Victoria and Ida on 12 July.

In September, she transferred to the South Atlantic Blockading Squadron and arrived at Charleston, South Carolina on 19 September. She served on the blockade of Charleston Harbor until the end of January 1863. On the night of 31 January, CSS Palmetto State and Chicora, both Confederate ironclad rams, slipped out of the main ship channel of the harbor. They hoped to recapture British iron propeller Princess Royal, taken by Union blockaders two days earlier with two powerful steam engines for new Confederate ironclads aboard. Mercedita was the first Union ship the southern raiders encountered, and Palmetto State succeeded in ramming her, ripping a hole in her keel, piercing her boiler, and leaving her in a sinking condition. Challenged "Surrender or I'll sink you," Mercedita – unable to move or bring her guns to bear – struck her colors. However, the Confederate rams – eager for further action – accepted paroles for Mercedita's officers and crew and sped off to attack Keystone State, Quaker City and Augusta before retiring to Charleston.

"A Lieutenant's commission in the Confederate States Navy was conferred on me, with orders to report for duty on the ironclad Chicora at Charleston. My duties were those of a deck officer, and I had charge of the first division. On the occasion of the attack upon the blockading squadron ... It was my part, on the memorable morning, to aim and fire one effective shell into the Keystone State while running down to attack us, which (according to Captain LeRoy's report), killing twenty-one men and severely wounding fifteen, caused him to haul down his flag in token of surrender. The enemy now kept at a respectful distance while preparing their ironclad vessels to sail up more closely. Our Navy Department continued slowly to construct more of these rams, all on the same general plan, fit for little else than harbor defense." -- William T. Glassell, Lt. CSN

Hardly captured before abandoned, Mercedita made temporary repairs before proceeding to Port Royal, South Carolina and Philadelphia, Pennsylvania for complete repairs. In April, she was attached to the West Indies Squadron, to escort California steamers over part of their route, from New York to Aspinwall, Panama. Later that spring, she joined the North Atlantic Blockading Squadron and operated from Beaufort, North Carolina for much of the remainder of the year. Joining the West Gulf Blockading Squadron in March 1865, she saw only brief action with it. In May, she searched for Susquehanna. When the conflict ended, the Union Navy resumed its peacetime activities, protecting American citizens and their property throughout the world. Mercedita went to Santo Domingo on 3 August to protect Americans there. Arriving at Ciudad de Santo Domingo on 11 August, the ship found the country in an unsettled political state, but there was no sign of the reported Spanish man-of-war on the southern coast. Mercedita departed Santo Domingo on 14 August, touching at Kingston, Jamaica on 17 August for coal en route home. Decommissioned on 14 October 1865, Mercedita was sold at public auction at New York on 25 October, and redocumented in merchant service on 9 November. She was converted to a brigantine on 16 June 1879.
