= Edward Donaldson =

- Born: November 17, 1816; Baltimore, Maryland, U.S.
- Died: May 15, 1889 (aged 72)
- Military career
- Allegiance: United States
- Branch: United States Navy
- Service years: 1835–1876
- Rank: Rear Admiral
- Commands: USS Sciota; USS Keystone State; USS Seminole
- Conflicts: American Civil War

Rear admiral Edward Donaldson (November 17, 1816 – May 15, 1889) was an officer in the United States Navy who participated in the American Civil War, particularly in the seas off of Alabama and Maryland.

== Biography ==
Donaldson was born in Baltimore, Maryland. He entered the Navy as cadet midshipman on July 21, 1835, and served on several vessels of war in the West India Squadron. In 1838, he went to the East Indies in the Columbus, and in 1839 participated in the attack on the forts on the coast of Sumatra. He was promoted passed midshipman in June 1841, and attached to the Mosquito fleet in Florida during 1841–1842, after which he served on various vessels until 1846, when he was appointed on the coast survey. He received his commission as lieutenant in October 1847, and was connected with the Dolphin, the Water Witch, the Merrimac, and the San Jacinto, and was on special shore duty until 1861. During 1861 he commanded the gun boat Sciota, attached to the Western Gulf Squadron, and took part in the bombardment of Forts Jackson and St. Philip, and the subsequent capture of New Orleans. He participated in the passage of the Vicksburg batteries, and was made commander in July 1862. After a year in command of the receiving ship at Philadelphia Navy Yard, he was transferred to the Keystone State as executive officer during her trip to the West Indies in search of the Confederate cruiser Sumter, and was her commander in 1863–1864.

During the Battle of Mobile Bay on August 5, 1864, he commanded the Seminole, and rendered efficient service by his coolness and judgment in piloting his vessel while passing Fort Morgan, the regular pilot being ill. In 1865 he was on ordnance duty in Baltimore, Maryland. He was made captain in July 1866, and subsequently had command of the receiving ship at Philadelphia until 1868, when he was assigned to the Brooklyn Navy Yard. In September 1871, he became commodore, and for a time had charge of the naval station in Mound City, Illinois. He was promoted to rear admiral on September 21, 1876, and placed on the retired list a few days later.
