= CSS Palmetto State =

1862 Confederate ironclad ship

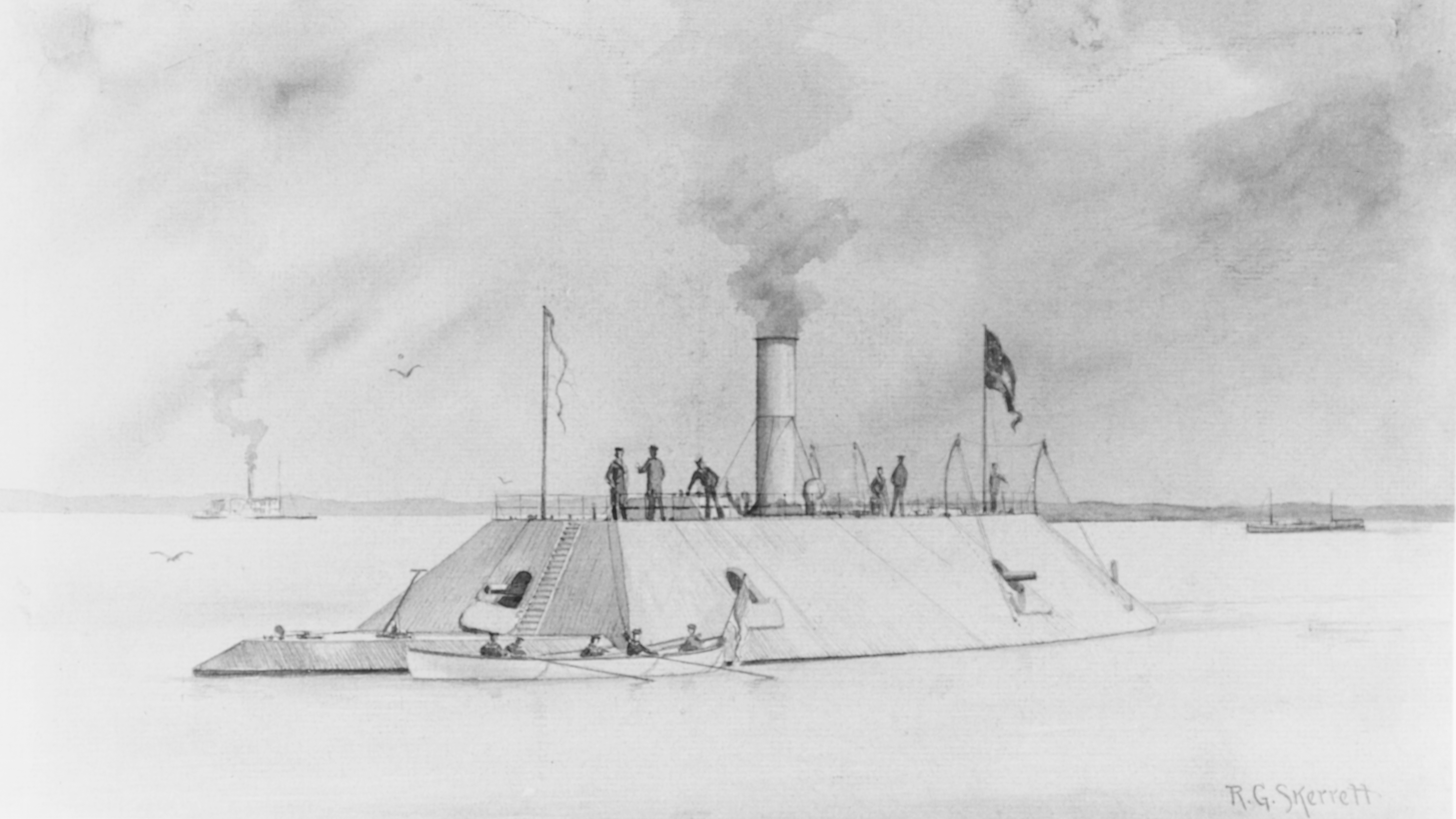
- A wash drawing of Palmetto State by R. G. Skerrett

History

Confederate States
- Name: Palmetto State
- Namesake: Nickname of South Carolina
- Laid down: January 1862
- Launched: September 1862
- Commissioned: September 1862
- Fate: Scuttled and burned, 18 February 1865

General characteristics
- Class & type: Richmond-class ironclad
- Length: 174 ft (53.0 m) (o/a); 150 ft (45.7 m) (p/p)
- Beam: 43 ft (13.1 m)
- Draft: 12 ft (3.7 m)
- Depth of hold: 12 ft (3.7 m)
- Installed power: 2 × fire-tube boilers
- Propulsion: 1 × shaft; 2 × direct-acting steam engines
- Speed: 6–7 knots (11–13 km/h; 6.9–8.1 mph)
- Complement: 120 officers and men
- Armament: 1 × 7 in (178 mm) Brooke rifle; 1 × 6.4 in (163 mm) Brooke rifle; 2 × 8 in (203 mm) smoothbore guns
- Armor: Casemate: 4 in (102 mm)

CSS (Note: Confederate States Ship.) Palmetto State was one of six Richmond class casemate ironclad rams built for the Confederate States Navy during the American Civil War. Completed in 1862, she defended Charleston, South Carolina and was burnt in 1865 to prevent her capture by advancing Union troops.

== Background and description ==
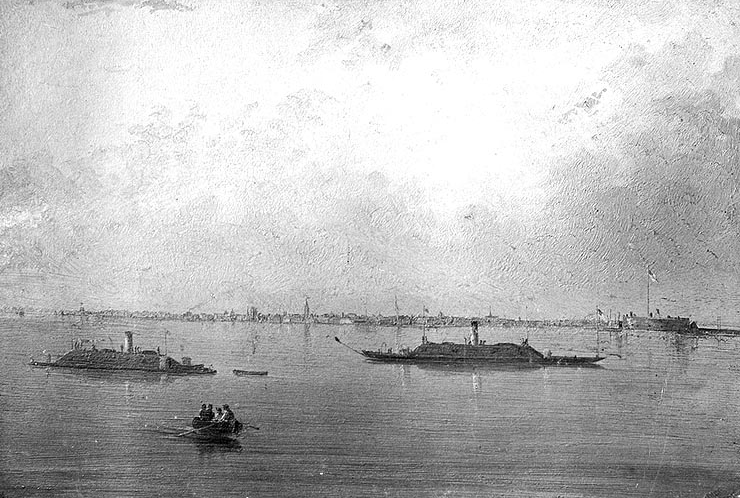
Confederate ironclads Chicora and Palmetto State in Charleston Harbor

The ship was built to a design by the Chief Naval Constructor, John L. Porter, based on his earlier work on the ironclad CSS Virginia, retaining the traditional curving ship-type hull, but with flat ends to the casemate. As usual for Confederate ships, dimensions vary slightly between sources. The plan showed an overall length of 174 feet (53.0 m) and a length between perpendiculars of 150 feet (45.7 m) with a maximum beam of 43 feet (13.1 m), a moulded beam of 32 feet (9.8 m) and a depth of hold of 12 ft (3.7 m). The ship's draft was 12 feet, although Canney says that Palmetto State drew 14 feet (4.3 m) of water. She was fitted with a hatch for the pilot above the steering wheel for ease in issuing orders to the helmsman and engine room abaft the funnel even though it blocked the pilot's forward vision.

The propulsion systems of the Richmond-class ironclads were different for each of the ships, often depending on what could be sourced locally. Palmetto State's pair of single-cylinder, direct-acting steam engines were taken from the gunboat CSS Lady Davis serving in Charleston. They used steam provided by a pair of horizontal fire-tube boilers built by the locally based Cameron & Company to drive a 8-or-10-foot (2.4 or 3.0 m) propeller. The boilers were probably 11 feet (3.4 m) tall, 10 feet (3.0 m) long, and 6 feet 9 inches (2.1 m) wide. The ironclad had a speed of 6–7 knots (11–13 km/h; 6.9–8.1 mph) and a crew of 120.

Palmetto State was initially armed with one 7-inch (178 mm) Brooke rifle on a pivot mount at the bow, a 6.4-inch (163 mm) Brooke rifle on a pivot mount in the stern, with two 8-inch (20.3 cm) muzzle-loading smoothbore guns on the broadside. The ship was later equipped with a spar torpedo on her bow in 1863. The Dictionary of American Naval Fighting Ships merely states that her armament consisted of two rifled guns and two smoothbore 9-inch (229 mm) guns. Naval historian Raimondo Luraghi states that the ship was armed with two Brooke rifles and two smoothbores, Naval historian Donald Canney says that a January 1865 report shows the ship equipped with ten 7-inch Brooke rifles, four on each broadside and one each in the bow and stern. He does not believe that it is accurate because the addition of so many additional guns would require rebuilding the casemate and would strain the ship's hull with so much extra weight.

Her casemate armor was 4 inches (102 mm) thick, backed by 22 inches (559 mm) of wood, while 2 inches (51 mm) of iron armor was used everywhere else.

== Construction and career ==
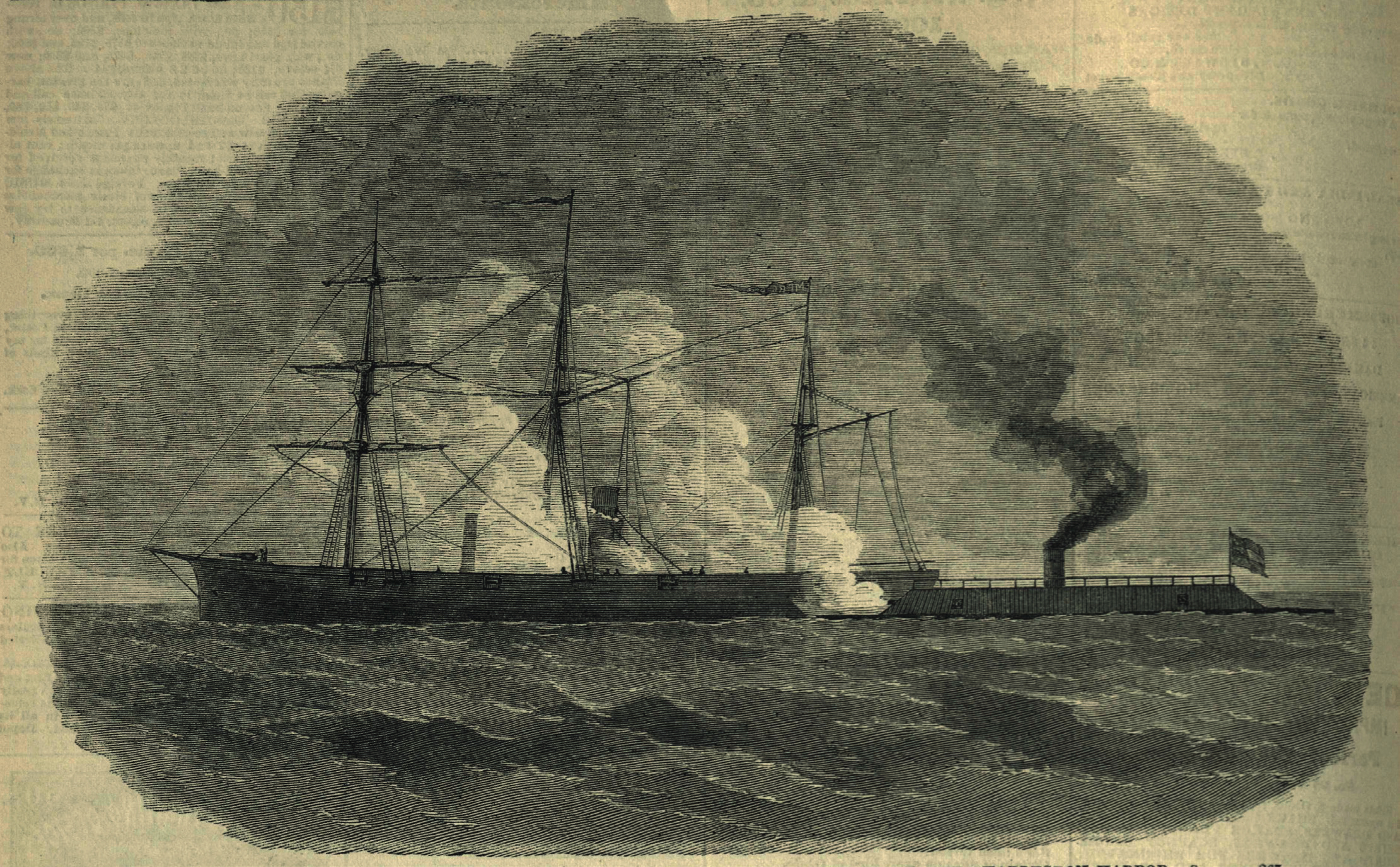
Attack on the U.S. Gunboat Mercedita by the Rebel Ram Palmetto State, off Charleston Harbor. New York Illustrated News

Named for the nickname of South Carolina, Palmetto State was laid down in January 1862 by Cameron & Company at their shipyard in Charleston, South Carolina.

Before dawn on 31 January 1863 Palmetto State and her sister ship CSS Chicora crept through thick haze to surprise the Union blockading force off Charleston. Taking full advantage of her low silhouette in the darkness, the ironclad steamed in under the guns of the Union gunboat USS Mercedita, ramming as well as firing heavy shot point-blank into her hull. Completely disabled, with cannons that could not be depressed low enough to fire at Palmetto State, the Union ship was forced to surrender. The ram then turned her attention to USS Keystone State, firing several shells into the blockader. Her steam chests punctured, Keystone State lost all power and had to be towed to safety. A long-range cannon duel between the Confederate rams and other Union blockaders then took place, but little damage was inflicted by either side before Palmetto State and Chicora withdrew to safety within Charleston Harbor. The attack by the Confederate rams caused the temporary withdrawal of the blockaders from their inshore positions and led to the claim by the Confederate government, unsuccessfully advanced, that the blockade of Charleston had been broken.

Palmetto State also joined in the defense of Charleston during Admiral Samuel Francis du Pont's unsuccessful 1–7 April 1863 attack on the harbor forts. Her officers and men were cited for rendering valuable services on the night of 6–7 September 1863 during the removal troops from Fort Wagner and Battery Gregg.

Palmetto State was later set afire by the Confederates to avoid capture upon the evacuation of Charleston on 18 February 1865.
