= USS Keystone State (1853) =

American sidewheel steamer

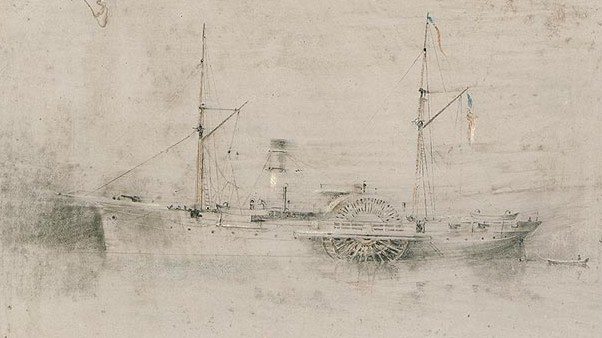
- USS Keystone State

History

United States
- Name: Keystone State
- Namesake: The state of Pennsylvania
- Owner: Philadelphia and Savannah Steam Navigation Company
- Builder: Vaughn & Lynn, Philadelphia
- Cost: $180,000
- Launched: 18 June 1853

United States
- Name: USS Keystone State
- Acquired: chartered, 19 April 1861; purchased, 10 June 1861
- Commissioned: 19 July 1861
- Decommissioned: 10 June 1863
- Recommissioned: 3 October 1863
- Decommissioned: 25 March 1865
- Fate: Sold 15 September 1865

United States
- Name: San Francisco
- Owner: William H. Webb
- Fate: Broken up in 1874
- Notes: Official number 22824; Signal letters H.R.G.M.

General characteristics in naval service
- Type: Gunboat
- Displacement: 1,364 long tons (1,386 t)
- Length: 220 ft (67 m)
- Beam: 35 ft (11 m)
- Draft: 14 ft 6 in (4.42 m)
- Depth of hold: 21 ft 10 in (6.65 m)
- Propulsion: Steam engine; sidewheel-propelled
- Sail plan: Bark
- Speed: 9.5 kn (10.9 mph; 17.6 km/h)
- Complement: 163 officers and enlisted
- Armament: 4 × 32-pounder guns, 30-pounder Parrott rifle, 50-pounder Parrott rifle

USS Keystone State was a wooden sidewheel steamer that served in the Union Navy during the American Civil War. She was a fast ship for her day and was used effectively to blockade Confederate ports on the Atlantic coast. She participated in the capture or destruction of 17 blockade runners. In addition to her military service, Keystone State had a lengthy commercial career before the war. Renamed San Francisco, she also sailed commercially after the war. The ship was built in 1853 and scrapped in 1874.

== Construction and characteristics ==
Keystone State was commissioned by the Philadelphia and Savannah Steam Navigation Company. She was intended to carry passengers and cargo as one of a pair of vessels offering weekly service between the two cities. Her hull was built at Philadelphia, Pennsylvania, at the Vaughn & Lynn Shipyard. Her frame was built of live oak and locust wood, and she was planked with white oak. The ship was 220 feet (67 m) long, with a beam of 35 feet (11 m), and a depth of hold of 21 feet (6.4 m). She displaced 1,364 tons.

She was propelled by a coal-fired side-lever steam engine. Steam was produced in two boilers. The engine had a single cylinder that was 80 inches (2.0 m) in diameter, with a stroke of 8 feet (2.4 m). The engine was built by the Southwark Foundry & Machine Company of Philadelphia, operated by Merrick & Sons. The steam engine drove paddlewheels which were 30 feet (9.1 m) in diameter with face of 10 feet (3.0 m). Her maximum speed was 14 knots, but the state of her hull and machinery reduced her maximum speed to as little as 10.5 knots on occasion.

The ship had two masts and was rigged as a bark. She could sail, but was slower and less maneuverable than under steam.

As originally built, she had 46 staterooms, a couple of salons, a dining room, ladies' parlor, smoking room, and a passenger library. She had running water in the washrooms, storage for ice, and cold rooms to keep food fresh for passengers. Her original cost was reported as $180,000.

Keystone State was launched on 18 June 1853. Sea trials of the newly completed ship took place on 19 September 1853. She was immediately placed in commercial service.

Her namesake, The Keystone State, is a nickname for Pennsylvania.

== Philadelphia and Savannah Steam Navigation Company (1853–1861) ==
Keystone State completed her first trip from Philadelphia to Savannah on 23 September 1853 after a 56.5 hour run. This was considered a fast sailing at the time. This trip inaugurated weekly scheduled service between the two cities. She and State of Georgia alternated departures and each completed a single one-way trip per week. Cabin passage cost $20 and steerage was $8.

On a north-bound trip in March 1854, a black man was found stowed-away inside the housing of one of the paddle wheels. This position was extremely dangerous and he was compelled to call for help. He claimed he was a free person, but being unable to prove his status, he was put ashore, jailed, and returned to Savannah.

On the night of 10–11 May 1855, while inbound to Philadelphia, she was hit by two small vessels. At 10 pm, the schooner Adrian, carrying coal for Fall River, Massachusetts, ran into Keystone State and sank in 15 minutes. The ship lowered a boat and managed to save three of her crew, but two others perished. Four hours later the schooner Little Tom hit the Keystone State and sank. This time the ship's boat was able to rescue the entire crew of five.

A more serious collision occurred at 1 am on the foggy night of 25 May 1856 when Keystone State hit the bark Cavalier. Keystone State's bow was crushed and she immediately began to flood. Her steam pumps barely kept up with the incoming water, and her captain was able to run the ship up onto the mud flats near Norfolk, Virginia, to keep her from sinking. While the colliding ships were briefly locked together, the 1st and 3rd mates and three sailors of Cavalier leapt aboard Keystone State. Despite the damage, Keystone State was back to her regular runs between Philadelphia and Savannah within a month.

In November 1855, the Philadelphia and Savannah Steam Navigation Company came to the conclusion that there was not enough business for two ships on the route, and switched State of Georgia to sailing between Philadelphia and Charleston, South Carolina. Keystone State continued her service to Savannah.

Keystone State primarily carried agricultural commodities north. In August 1855, she brought 3,300 sacks of wheat to Philadelphia. In November 1856, her cargo included 104 bales of cotton, and in December 1856, 50 casks of rice. In return, the ship carried a variety of manufactured or processed goods south. In March 1861 her cargo for Charleston included 950 barrels of whiskey, 350 hogsheads of bacon, 750 barrels of beer, 260 bales of cloth, 200 barrels of flour, 300 packages of boots and shoes, 100 cases of hats and caps, 70 carriages, and 250 boxes of candles.

At approximately 2 am on 18 August 1857, Keystone State hit and sank the barge A. Groves, jr. which was under tow by the tug Artisan in the Delaware River. The owner of the barge sued the Philadelphia and Savannah Steam Navigation Company claiming that Keystone State should have maneuvered to avoid the collision. The case ultimately went to the U.S. Supreme Court which found in favor of Keystone State, and reaffirmed maritime rules of the road that remain in place today.

On 7 September 1857, the ship was bound for Savannah, 75 miles south of Cape Henlopen, when the side lever on her steam engine broke. She had to be towed to Norfolk, where her passengers debarked, and then was towed back to Philadelphia for repairs. She was back in operation the next month. She suffered another engine failure due to a broken side lever in June 1860 and was out of service for about a month while repairs were made in Philadelphia.

The Philadelphia and Savannah Line ceased operations at the beginning of 1858 due to a lack of business, and the ship was idled. March 1858 found Keystone State making her first trip from Philadelphia to Charleston, South Carolina. Cabin fare on this new route was $15 and steerage $5. In the tensions leading to the Civil War, sailing between Philadelphia and Charleston became more difficult. In November 1860, Keystone State was required to lower the United States flag and fly the Palmetto Flag before she could sail into Charleston. At the beginning of 1861 United States army troops in Charleston prepared for hostilities by consolidating on Fort Sumter. The army released the civilian workers at the Charleston forts, and about 100 took passage north on Keystone State. The ship continued to sail to Charleston right to the brink of the war. She arrived back in Philadelphia on her last civilian trip to the south on 10 April 1861.

== Civil War service (1861–1865) ==
=== Navy charter (1861) ===
Secessionists began bombarding Fort Sumter on 12 April 1861. The Union Navy was largely unprepared for war and reacted by acquiring civilian ships. Acting on orders from Commodore Hiram Paulding, the commandant of the Philadelphia Navy Yard, Captain Samuel F. DuPont, chartered Keystone State for naval service on 19 April 1861. DuPont received the order in the morning and chartered the ship in three hours. Her charter rate was $600 per day. She was towed to the Navy Yard that day, and even during the tow machinists worked to convert her to a naval vessel. At 6 pm that evening DuPont began loading her with more than 50 Marines, 50 sailors, ammunition, seven days of coal, and two weeks of provisions. The ship was armed with four 24-pounder guns. She sailed at dawn on 20 April 1861, under the command of Lieutenant Maxwell Woodhull, to deliver arms and troops to Washington, D.C.

On her way to Washington, Keystone State arrived off the Norfolk Navy Yard on the morning of 21 April 1861, by which time it was aflame to prevent it from falling into the hands of the Confederacy. She worked with several other Navy ships to extricate USS Cumberland from the docks through the obstacles placed by the Confederates, and helped evacuate sailors from the Navy Yard and USS Pennsylvania. She reached Washington on 23 April 1861. On 24 April 1861, now under the command of Lieutenant Stephen D. Trenchard, she was ordered to New York to take on supplies, and then to sail to back Washington, D.C. The ship arrived in Washington on 1 May 1861. On 3 May 1861 Keystone State embarked gun carriages and ordinance supplies from the Washington Arsenal for delivery to Fort Washington and Fortress Monroe. She then sailed back to New York to pick up yet more supplies to reinforce Washington, including five guns. She reached Washington on 14 May 1861.

President Lincoln imposed a blockade of Confederate ports on 19 April 1861. The announcement caught a number of foreign vessels in port. As they sailed home, many were snapped up by the Union Navy. The British brig Hiawatha was heavily laden with tobacco when she sailed for Liverpool on 19 May 1861. USS Minnesota, part of the blockading force based on Fortress Monroe, fired two shots at her and then sent a prize crew aboard to take possession. Hiawatha was towed to New York by Keystone State, arriving on 23 May 1861. On board, Keystone State had 115 women and children who were fleeing the conflict in the South, mostly from the Norfolk area. On that same day she was ordered to sail to Philadelphia to be returned to her owners, ending her charter.

Still short of ships, the Navy purchased Keystone State for $125,000 on June 10, 1861. She was moved to the Philadelphia Navy Yard where she underwent a survey of needed repairs beginning the next day. Repairs began within a week of acquisition, and included dry-docking and replacing the copper sheeting on her hull. Her battery was upgraded to four 32-pounder guns.

She was commissioned at the Philadelphia Navy Yard on 19 July 1861, Commander Gustavus H. Scott in command.

=== Gulf Blockading Squadron (1861) ===
Upon commissioning, Keystone State was assigned to the Gulf Blockading Squadron. She sailed from Philadelphia in search of the commerce raider CSS Sumter. The chase went from Kingston, Jamaica to St. Thomas, Virgin Islands. She then circumnavigated Puerto Rico, stopping in Martinique along the way. Keystone State sailed to Port of Spain, Trinidad, where she found that she had missed Sumter by five days. She visited many other Caribbean ports and sailed as far south as Aspinwall, Panama before returning to the United States. While she failed in her mission to stop the Sumter, she did capture a blockade runner. The steamer Salvor was sailing from Havana to Tampa with a cargo that included 600 pistols and 500,000 percussion caps when she was captured by Keystone State near the Dry Tortugas on 14 October 1861. The ship returned to Philadelphia, via Key West, with Salvor in tow, on 25 October 1861.

While Keystone State was at the Philadelphia Navy Yard, she had her armament upgraded again. She was equipped with six 8-inch guns, two 32-pounders, and a Parrott rifle.

At Philadelphia, Commander William E. Le Roy took command of the ship on 12 November 1861. The sidewheeler left port on 8 December 1861. She visited Bermuda still searching for Sumter, and arrived back at Fortress Monroe on 26 December 1861 with nothing to show for her cruise but two cases of smallpox.

=== South Atlantic Blockading Squadron, (1861–1863) ===
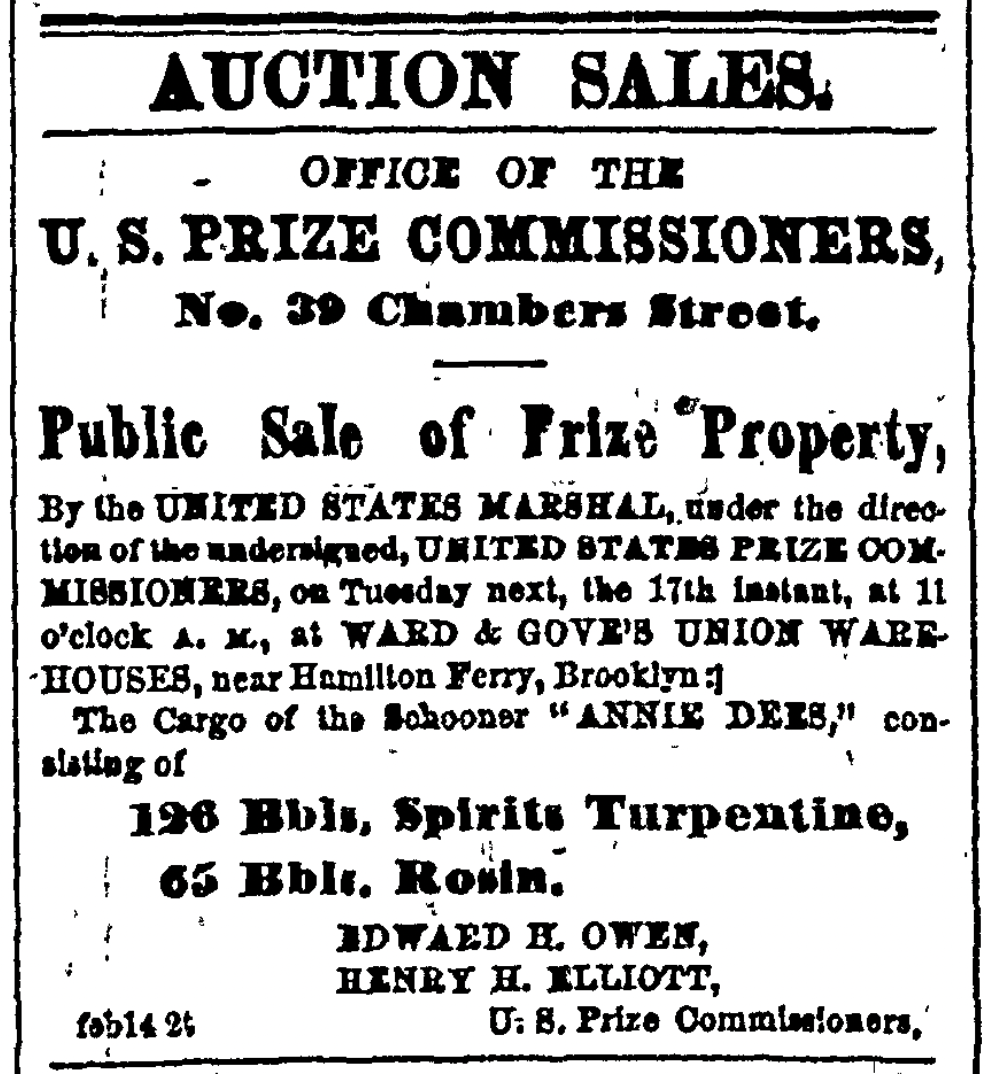
Advertisement for the sale of Annie Dees cargo. The sale of ships and cargo seized for violating the Union blockade funded prize money distributed to Keystone State and other blockaders.

In January 1862, Keystone State was assigned to South Atlantic Blockading Squadron. Her first assignment was to blockade the port of Fernandina, Florida. She engaged Confederate batteries at Amelia Island while on station, apparently with little damage on either side. Keystone State captured the British schooner Mars off Fenandina on 5 February 1862. She was laden with a cargo of salt.

In March 1862, Keystone State was part of Flag Officer DuPont's fleet which captured Fernandina and the surrounding islands, putting an end to the need to blockade the port.

On her next cruise, she was assigned to blockade the port of Georgetown, South Carolina. On 10 April 1862, she chased schooner Liverpool of Nassau ashore where she was burned to the water's edge. Schooner Dixie, bound for Nassau with a cargo of 100 bales of cotton, 234 barrels of turpentine, 40 bushels of peanuts, and 3,000 pounds of rice, was captured on 15 April 1862.

After returning to port for coal and supplies, Keystone State returned to blockade duty, this time off Charleston. On 29 May 1862 she captured the British steamer Elizabeth, in bound from Nassau with 50 crates of Enfield rifles in cargo. The schooner Cora was taken two days later. Keystone State took schooner Sarah, laden with cotton, and Catalina, off Charleston on 20 June 1862. She captured the schooner Fanny attempting to slip into Charleston with a cargo of salt on 22 August 1862. Keystone State participated in the capture of schooner Annie Dees on 17 November 1862.

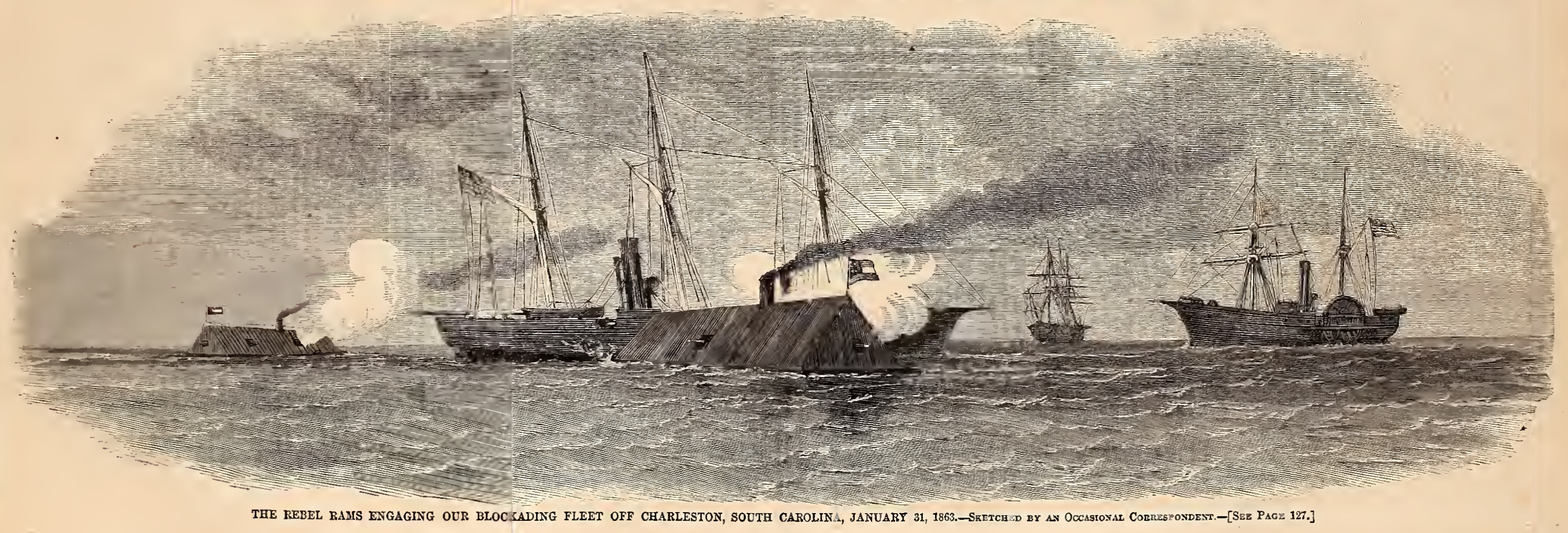
The battle off Charleston on January 31, 1863. Keystone State is on the right.

At dawn on 31 January 1863, Keystone State was at anchor, part of the blockading force off Charleston Harbor. Two Confederate ironclads, CSS Palmetto State and CSS Chicora came out of the early morning fog to challenge the Union ships. They attacked USS Mercedita and succeeded in ramming her, disabling her machinery, and killing several of her crew. They turned next to Keystone State, which was hit by ten shells. At approximately 6 am, a shot ripped into Keystone State's steam drum, killing 19 men and wounding a further 20. Since she carried a crew of 163 men, her losses were a quarter of the crew. USS Housatanic engaged the ironclads, which retired to Charleston, but Keystone State was on fire, leaking badly, and had two feet of water in the hold. She was taken under tow by USS Memphis and reached Port Royal, South Carolina, where temporary repairs were made.

The ship got underway on 22 February 1863 for blockading duty off St. Simons Sound, Georgia. She served there until departing for Philadelphia on 2 June 1863 for permanent repairs. Keystone State was found to be "very much out of order" on her arrival at the Navy Yard and faced months of work. She was decommissioned on 10 June 1863 and her crew given a 10-day furlough. The ship was hauled out in a floating drydock to repair hull damage from her encounter with the Confederate ironclads. Her engines were overhauled.

=== North Atlantic Blockading Squadron, 1863–1865 ===
Keystone State was recommissioned on 3 October 1863, Commander Edward Donaldson in command, and stood out to sea on 27 October. Three days later she joined the North Atlantic Blockading Squadron at Wilmington, North Carolina. Sometime around the turn of the year, Donaldson yielded command of the ship to Commander Pierce Crosby. By this point in the war, Wilmington was the last major Confederate port, concentrating both blockaders are blockade runners alike. Keystone State participated in the capture of six ships during her final year of blockade duty including the steamer Margaret and Jessie in 1863, and Caledonia, Rouen, Lilian, Elsie, and Siren in 1864.

The ships captured by Keystone State not only helped the war effort, but were profitable for the ship's crew as well. Under the laws of the day, special courts evaluated whether ships were captured legally, which ships had participated in their capture, and how much the captured ships were worth, net of expenses. Prize courts then awarded cash in the form of prize money to ship's crews. Keystone State was lucky in prize money:

Ships captured by Keystone State during blockade duty
Prize	Type	Date	Location	Prize money	Distribution
Hiawatha	bark	19 May 1861	Off Norfolk	$239,701.71	Keystone State and 4 other ships
Salvor	steamer	14 October 1861	Off Dry Tortugas	$31,842.57	Keystone State only
Mars	schooner	5 February 1862	Off Fernandina	$0	
Dixie	schooner	15 April 1862	Off Georgetown	$28,521.23	Keystone State and 1 other vessel
Elizabeth	steamer	29 May 1862	Off Charleston	$66,250.18	Keystone State and 1 other vessel
Cora	schooner	31 May 1862	Off Charleston	$97.60	Keystone State only
Sarah	schooner	20 June 1862	Off Charleston	$9,891.44	Keystone State and 7 other ships
Catalina	schooner	20 June 1862	Off Charleston	$5,101.01	Keystone State and 1 other vessel
Fanny	schooner	22 August 1862	Off St. Simons		Keystone State only
Annie Dees	schooner	17 November 1862	Off Charleston	$14, 609.20	Keystone State and 10 other vessels
Margaret and Jessie	steamer	5 November 1863	Off Wilmington	$158,158.47	Keystone State and 2 other ships
Caledonia	steamer	30 May 1864	Off Wilmington	$11, 903.72	Keystone State and 1 other vessel
Siren	steamer	5 June 1864	South Cape Lookout	$7,056.19	Keystone State only
Rouen	steamer	2 July 1864	at sea	$36,756.54	Keystone State only
Lilian	steamer	24 August 1864	Off Wilmington	$153,477.26	Keystone State and 2 other ships
Elsie	steamer	5 September 1864	Off Wilmington	$211,370.57	Keystone State and 1 other ship

In addition to participating in the capture of sixteen ships listed above, Keystone State also plucked from the sea almost 300 bales of cotton thrown overboard by blockade runners seeking to destroy valuables that would fall into the hands of their captors. These generated almost $200,000 of prize money for Keystone State.

==== First Battle of Fort Fisher, December 1864 ====
In order to finally close Wilmington to blockade runners, the Union determined to take the forts on the Cape Fear River, starting with Fort Fisher. Admiral David Porter assembled a fleet at Fortress Monroe for the offensive. Porter commanded Keystone State, now captained by Commander Henry Rolando, to lead the reserve line of battle. At 7:30 am on 24 December 1864 Rolando signalled the reserve division to get underway, and by 8:00 am the ships were steaming westward towards Fort Fisher in line of battle.

At 2:52 pm Keystone State began firing over and between the ships in the first echelon, to support Army troops as they landed and fought to take the fort. She ceased firing at approximately 5:00 pm. During this action she fired 56 rounds from her 30-pounder Parrott rifle, 24 rounds from her 50-pounder Parrott rifle and 14 rounds from the 32-pounder broadside gun.

However, late in the afternoon, the Union Army commander, General Benjamin Franklin Butler, decided that the Confederate works could not be taken and ordered his troops to reembark. Keystone State withdrew to Beaufort for coal and supplies.

==== Second Battle of Fort Fisher, January 1865 ====
Porter immediately began planning for a second assault, this time with a different Army general in charge of the land forces. Most of the fleet that participated in the first battle also joined the second fight. Keystone State was one of three exceptions. She was loading coal in Beaufort when the fort fell. She arrived at the scene of the battle on 16 January 1865 with a coal schooner in tow.

After Fort Fisher fell, the campaign to take Wilmington continued on the river. On 20 January 1865, Keystone State towed the monitor Monadanock over the Cape Fear River bar. Admiral Porter requested use of the monitor Montauk for the final assault on Wilmington, and Keystone State was assigned to tow the ship up the Cape Fear River on 21 January 1865. During February 1865, Keystone State supported Army advances along the shore of the River.

Porter's success in closing the last major Confederate port meant that blockaders such as Keystone State no longer had a role to play. She got underway on 13 March 1865 towing monitor Montauk to Hampton Roads, and arrived at Baltimore, Maryland, on 20 March 1865.

Commander Rolando was detached from the ship and Keystone State decommissioned on 25 March 1865. She was sold at auction at Washington, D.C., on 15 September 1865 to Marshall O. Roberts for $54,000.

== Commercial service (1866–1872) ==
=== North American Steamship Company (1866–1868) ===
Marshall Roberts led a commercial shipping business which sailed between New York and San Francisco via ships in the Atlantic and Pacific connected by an overland crossing of Nicaragua. He sent Keystone State to the Morgan Iron Works in New York to be converted into a civilian merchant vessel suitable for this trade. The ship was renamed San Francisco. Roberts sold control of the company to William H. Webb in 1866 and it became known as the North American Steamship Company. San Francisco completed multiple trips between New York and Greytown, Nicaragua before the company closed in 1868.

=== New York and Mexican Mail Steamship Line (1866–1869) ===
Beginning in July 1868, Webb chartered San Francisco to the New York and Mexican Mail Steamship Line owned by Francois Alexandre. She sailed from New York to Havana, Cuba to Sisal, Mexico, and finally to Vera Cruz, Mexico, before returning to New York. Her last run on this route was in February 1869.

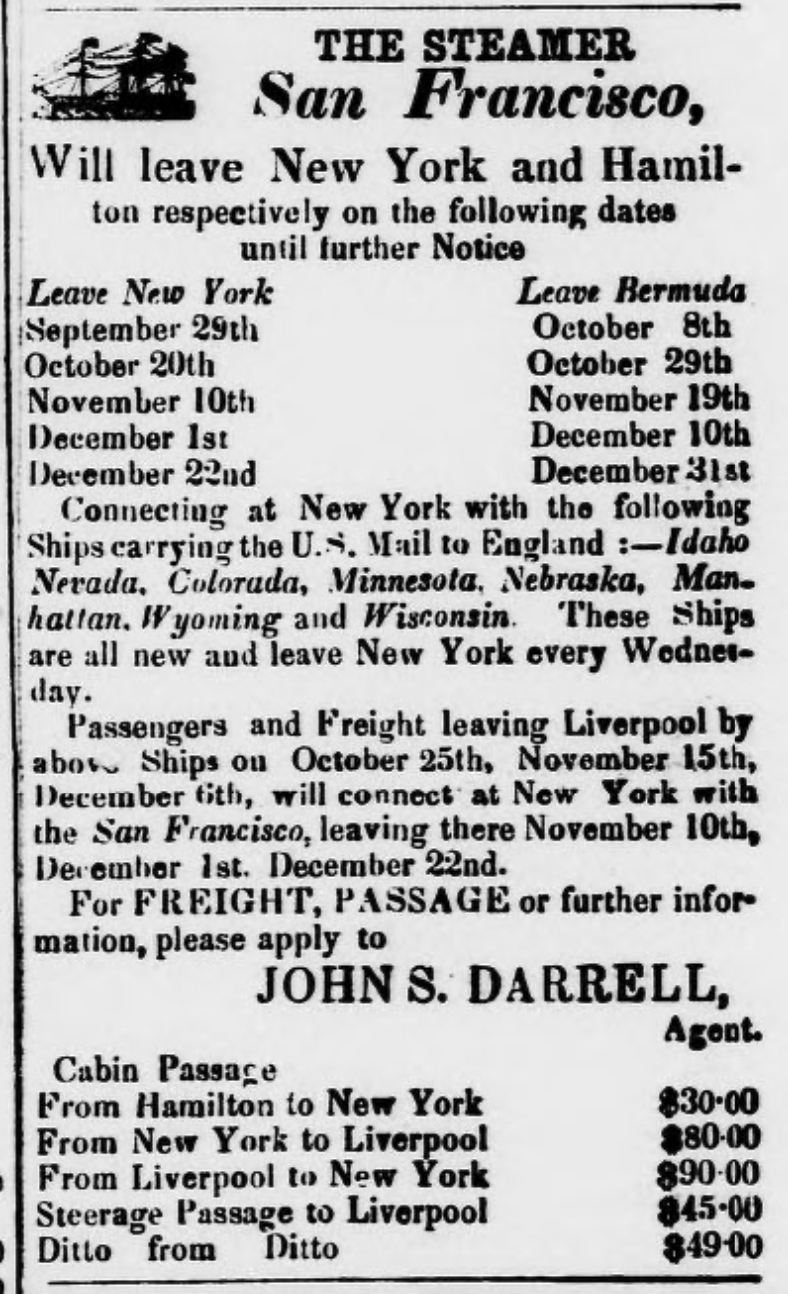
October 1870 ad for San Francisco's service between New York and Bermuda

=== Bermuda (1870–1872) ===
The government of Bermuda solicited offers for regular steamship service between New York and Hamilton. Webb offered San Francisco in response to the tender offer. The ship arrived in Hamilton on 7 August 1870 for inspection, as required by Bermudian law. It was not clear that a ship of her size could enter Hamilton Harbor, and in fact, she grounded on her first attempt. A more experienced pilot guided her in safely, however, and the ship was accepted by the government. Thereafter, San Francisco completed two roundtrips per month between New York and Hamilton. A first-class passage in either direction cost $30, and a steerage berth cost $15. The government of Bermuda paid Webb 240 pounds sterling per round-trip as a subsidy. This original contract was set to expire on 31 December 1871, but Webb won a renewal in November 1871.

Concern over San Francisco's ability to enter Hamilton was well founded. She went aground again on 18 September 1870. While entering Hamilton Harbor on 5 December 1870, the ship hit a rock and sank in 15 feet of water. She was refloated and repaired at the Royal Naval Dockyard.

San Francisco brought people, mail, news, food, and manufactured goods of all kinds to Bermuda. She was so important to the island that the Colonial Secretary ordered a special flag to be flown from government telegraph stations from the moment the ship was first sighted inbound to Hamilton. The ship was significant to the export economy of Bermuda as well.

On 22 April 1871, she cleared Hamilton with the single largest cargo that had ever been shipped from the island, over 9,000 barrels and 20,000 boxes of various crops. While Bermuda was a colony of Great Britain, there was no direct steamship service between the two islands. Thus, British government officials sailed the Atlantic to New York, and then completed their trip to Bermuda aboard San Francisco. In May, 1871, the ship received a 17-gun salute from the Royal Artillery at Fort Albert upon arrival in Hamilton with Major General John Henry Lefroy, the new governor, aboard.

Webb's renewal application in November 1871 stated that the 240 pound sterling per round-trip subsidy was not enough to cover his losses operating San Francisco on the route, and he expected that the government would work to improve the profitability. Apparently, the situation did not improve and Webb notified the government in late December 1872 that he would abandon the route in January 1873.

== San Francisco scrapped (1874) ==
Webb found no further use for the ship and there are no newspaper accounts of her sailing again after returning from Bermuda. On 8 July 1874 San Francisco cleared New York for Fall River, Massachusetts. She was towed there by the tug Cora L. Staples. She was broken up in Fall River.
