= CSS Chicora =

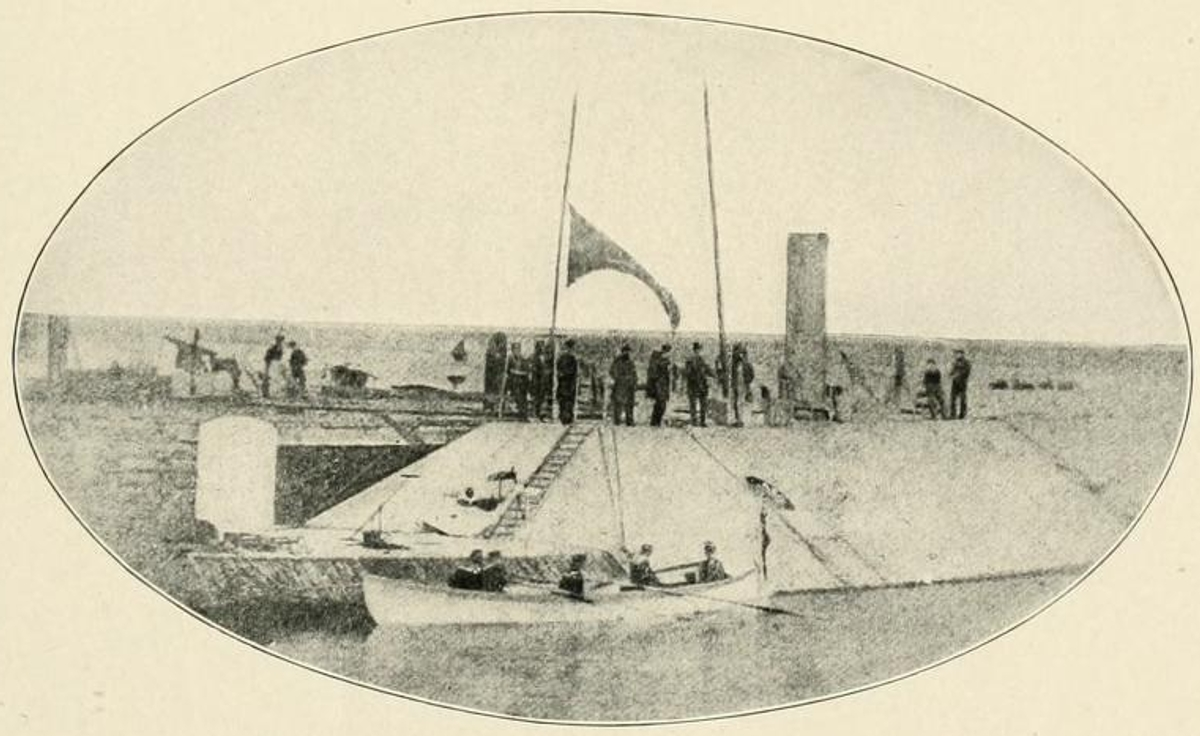

History

Confederate States
- Name: Chicora
- Namesake: Chicora
- Ordered: 1862
- Laid down: March 1862
- Commissioned: November 1862
- Fate: Burned 18 February 1865

General characteristics
- Displacement: approximately 850 tons
- Length: 172.5 ft (52.6 m)
- Beam: 35 ft (11 m)
- Draft: 14 ft (4.3 m)
- Propulsion: Steam engine
- Speed: 5 knots (9.3 km/h; 5.8 mph)
- Complement: 150 officers and men
- Armament: 2 x 9 in (229 mm) smoothbores; 4 x 6 in (152 mm) 32-pounder muzzle loading rifles

CSS Chicora was a Confederate ironclad ram that fought in the American Civil War. It was built under contract at Charleston, South Carolina in 1862. James M. Eason built it to John L. Porter's plans, using up most of a $300,000 State appropriation for construction of marine batteries; Eason received a bonus for "skill and promptitude." Its iron shield was 4 inches (102 mm) thick, backed by 22 inches (559 mm) of oak and pine, with 2-inch (51 mm) armor at its ends. Keeled in March, it was commissioned in November, Commander John Randolph Tucker, CSN assuming command.

In thick, predawn haze on January 31, 1863, Chicora and CSS Palmetto State raided the Federal blockading force of unarmored ships lying just outside the entrance to Charleston Harbor. With ram and gun, Palmetto State forced USS Mercedita to surrender, then disabled USS Keystone State, who had to be towed to safety. Chicora meanwhile engaged other Union ships in a long-range gun duel, from which it emerged unscathed to withdraw victoriously to shelter inside the harbor.

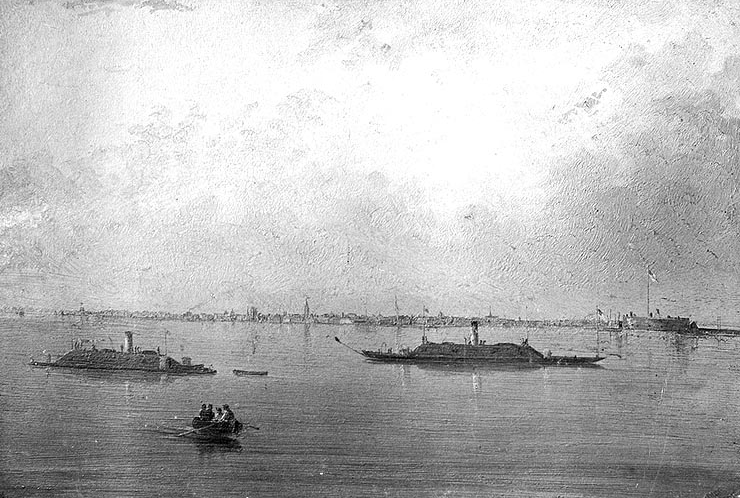
CSS Chicora and Palmetto State at anchor in Charleston Harbor

It took part in the defense of the forts at Charleston on April 7 when they were attacked by a squadron of ironclad monitors under Rear Admiral Samuel Francis du Pont, USN. The Federal ships were forced to retire for repairs and did not resume the action.

Chicora was actively employed in the fighting around Charleston during 1863 and 1864. Its valuable services included the transporting of troops during the evacuation of Morris Island, and the bombardment of Forts Sumter, Gregg, and Wagner. In August 1863 she had the distinction of furnishing the first volunteer officer and crew for the Confederate Submarine Torpedo Boat H. L. Hunley.

"A Lieutenant's commission in the Confederate States Navy was conferred on me, with orders to report for duty on the ironclad Chicora at Charleston. My duties were those of a deck officer, and I had charge of the first division. On the occasion of the attack upon the blockading squadron ... It was my part, on the memorable morning, to aim and fire one effective shell into the Keystone State while running down to attack us, which (according to Captain LeRoy's report), killing twenty-one men and severely wounding fifteen, caused him to haul down his flag in token of surrender. The enemy now kept at a respectful distance while preparing their ironclad vessels to sail up more closely. Our Navy Department continued slowly to construct more of these rams, all on the same general plan, fit for little else than harbor defense." -- William T. Glassell, Lt. CSN

It was destroyed by the Confederates when Charleston was evacuated on February 18, 1865.
