= John L. Porter =

American naval constructor

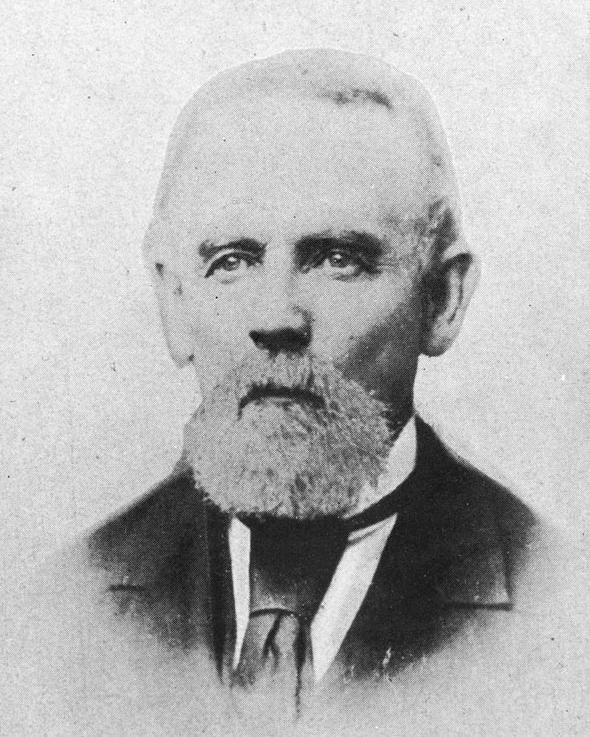
John L. Porter, Chief Naval Constructor of the Confederate States Navy

John Luke Porter (13 September 1813 – 4 December 1893) was a naval constructor for United States Navy and the Confederate States Navy.

== Early life ==
Porter was born in Portsmouth, Virginia in 1813. His mother was Frances Pritchard, daughter of Captain William Pritchard, an officer of the Revolutionary War. He had four brothers, two of whom were in shipbuilding business. Porter learned the art of shipbuilding from his father.

== United States Navy ==
In 1846 he was appointed acting constructor in United States Navy and superintended the building of the iron sloop-of-war USS Alleghany in Pittsburgh, Pennsylvania. While in Pittsburgh he designed and submitted to the Navy Department plans and specifications for an ironclad warship, but his idea did not receive much attention in Washington. The ironclad warships were a new concept at this time and it wasn't until 1859 until the first ironclad battleship, Gloire, was built by French Navy.

After three years at Pittsburgh, Porter received an assignment as a regular constructor of the sloop-of-war USS Constellation, the steam sloops USS Pensacola and USS Seminole, and the steam frigates USS Powhatan and USS Colorado. Upon the secession of Florida in January 1861 Porter was stationed at Pensacola Navy Yard in Florida. He was ordered to the Washington Navy Yard and then to the Gosport Navy Yard, where he witnessed the start of the Civil War.

== Confederate States Navy ==
Although he opposed the secession of Virginia, he kept allegiance to his state and resigned from the U.S. Navy in May 1861.

Porter began working for the Confederate States Navy at the Gosport Navy Yard, at Portsmouth. He modified his previous ironclad design and submitted it to Secretary Stephen R. Mallory of the Confederate States Navy on 24 June 1861. Chief Engineer of the Navy William P. Williamson, Lt. John Mercer Brooke and Porter developed a plan of the conversion of the scuttled and burned steam frigate USS Merrimack to an ironclad, which became CSS Virginia when commissioned in February 1862. Porter had overall responsibility for the conversion, while Brooke was responsible for her iron plate and heavy ordnance and Williamson oversaw the ship's machinery.

Sometimes after the blockade of the Confederate ports in Summer 1861, Porter was appointed Chief Constructor in the Confederate States Navy and served in that capacity until the end of the war.

After the Confederates abandoned the Norfolk area in May 1862, Porter became a Naval Constructor at Richmond, Virginia and later at Wilmington, North Carolina. He was promoted to Chief Naval Constructor in January 1864 and served in that capacity to the end of the U.S. Civil War, designing many of the South's domestically-built warships.

== Later life ==
Following the conflict, Porter worked in civilian shipbuilding industry in Baltimore and ferry operations in Norfolk.

When Portsmouth, Virginia was first incorporated, Porter was elected president of the first City Council. he died in 1893

He is buried at Cedar Grove Cemetery, Portsmouth, Virginia.
