= CSS Isondiga =

1863 American Confederate wooden gunboat

History

Confederate States
- Name: Isondiga
- Builder: Krenson and Hawkes
- Commissioned: 1863
- Fate: Burned to prevent capture, December 21, 1864

General characteristics
- Type: Gunboat
- Length: 116 feet (35 m)
- Beam: 21 feet (6.4 m)
- Draft: 6 ft 6 in (1.98 m)
- Propulsion: Screw steamer
- Speed: 6 knots (11 km/h; 6.9 mph)
- Complement: 60
- Armament: 1 × Dahlgren gun 1 × Brooke rifle

CSS Isondiga was a wooden gunboat that served in the Confederate States Navy during the American Civil War. Designed according to Matthew Fontaine Maury's plan to produce a large number of small vessels to swamp the Union blockade, Isondiga was one of only two or three of these Maury gunboats actually completed, and the only one completed as designed. The Maury gunboats project had been almost entirely cancelled in favor of ironclad production after the Battle of Hampton Roads. Isondiga was built in Savannah, Georgia, and was transferred to the Confederate Navy in January 1863 to begin the fitting out process. At this time, she was commanded by Lieutenant Joel S. Kennard.

In late May 1863, Isondiga accompanied the ironclad CSS Atlanta in an attempt to attack the Union blockade in Wassaw Sound, but this was foiled when Atlanta ran aground. On June 17, Isondiga and the steamer CSS Resolute accompanied Atlanta in an engagement where the ironclad attacked two Union monitors and was quickly captured. At times later in 1863, Isondiga was inactivate because parts of her crew were temporarily transferred to Charleston, South Carolina. She continued service in the Savannah area in 1864. Kennard was transferred to the gunboat CSS Macon in June. In December, the city was about to fall into Union hands, and on December 20, Isondiga covered the Confederate retreat from the city over a pontoon bridge. While trying to escape herself, Isondiga ran aground and was burned by her crew on December 21 under orders from her commander, Lieutenant Hamilton Dalton.

== Design ==
In October 1861, during the American Civil War, Confederate naval officer Matthew Fontaine Maury, who held the rank of commander, proposed that the breakaway nation's best counter to the more developed Union Navy would be to build a large fleet of small, cheap vessels in order to swamp the Union blockade. The Confederate States Congress approved construction of up to 100 vessels of a modified design in December. As approved, the design called for vessels that were 106 feet (32 m) long, with a beam of 20 feet (6.1 m). The vessels were to be screw steamers armed with a 6.4-inch (16 cm) rifled cannon and a 9-inch (23 cm) Dahlgren gun. This design was known as the Maury gunboats. Contracts to build three of these vessels were awarded to the Savannah, Georgia, firm of Krenson and Hawkes. The specifications provided to the firm by the Confederate Navy placed extreme length of the hull at 116 feet (35 m) and extreme beam as 21 feet (6.4 m). Each ship's keel was to measure 12 inches (30 cm) from side to side and 10 inches (25 cm) from top to bottom. The keelson was to be made of white oak and be 10 inches (25 cm) across and 9 inches (23 cm) deep. The contract allowed for the frames to be made either of white oak or yellow pine, and the frames were to be 8.5 inches (22 cm) at the bottom and taper up to 5.5 inches (14 cm). The lower planks were to be either 2.5 inches (6.4 cm) of oak or 3 inches (7.6 cm) of pine, with the thickness of the upper planks to be smaller. The planks were fastened to the frames with both treenails and metal spikes, with bolts at the plank ends. The naval historian Donald L. Canney notes that this method of fastening was much more secure than that used for the larger Confederate gunboat CSS Chattahoochee, which had similar scantling dimensions.

Deck planking was to be 3 inches (7.6 cm) of yellow pine, fastened down with spikes. The Maury gunboats were to be equipped with two ship's boats and the requisite davits, two anchors, a windlass, pumps, and other equipment. Isondiga had no masts and had a nominal crew strength of 60. Her draft as completed was 6 feet 6 inches (198 cm). For much of her service, she was armed with a 6.4-inch Brooke rifle and a 9-inch Dahlgren smoothbore, but a report dated November 5, 1864, stated that she was armed with three cannon. In March 1862, the Battle of Hampton Roads convinced Confederate leadership that it would be better to build ironclads than the Maury gunboats, and funding for Maury gunboats not yet begun was removed. Canney states that only Isondiga and CSS Torch were completed of the Maury gunboats, although CSS Yadkin may also have been of the class. While Confederate naval constructor John L. Porter ordered some changes to Isondiga's design, Canney notes that she was "apparently the only Maury gunboat completed as designed". In calm water, Isondiga had a top speed of about 6 knots (11 km/h; 6.9 mph), although this was reduced by a design flaw that resulted in the propeller being partially above water. When the water was not calm, the propeller would be out of the water entirely in the troughs of waves. Her commander thought that she steered well, except that when the ship was going in reverse "the rudder had no perceptible effect on her".

== Construction and service ==
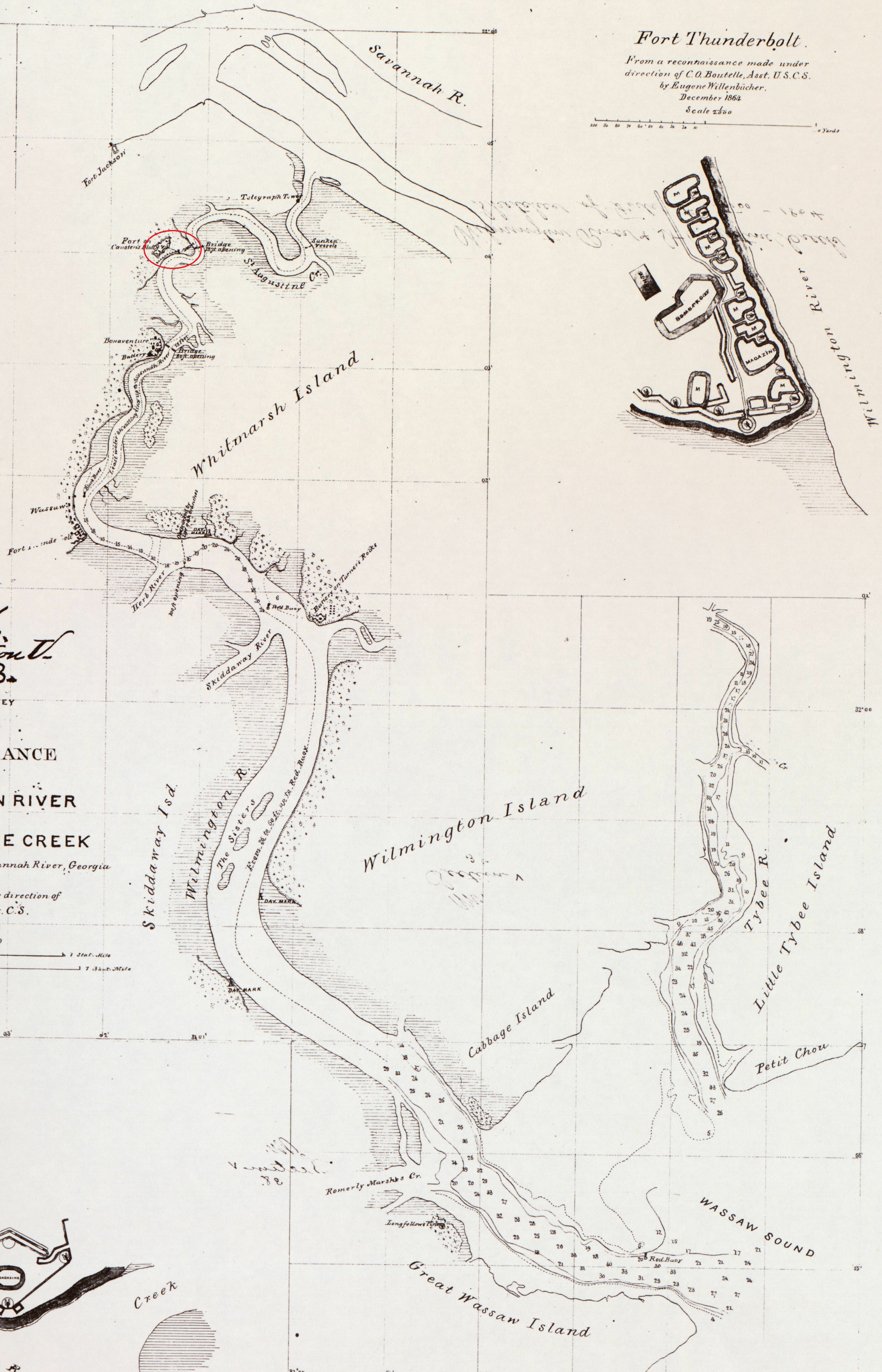
Wartime map of the St. Augustine Creek area. The Savannah River is at the top of the map, with Wassaw Sound in the lower right. Causton's Bluff is circled in red in the upper left.

It is not known when Isondiga was launched, but Krenson and Hawkes received their final payment for her construction on January 17, 1863; the vessel was to have been completed over seven months earlier. At this time, the Confederate Navy took possession of the boat and began the fitting out process. Isondiga was commanded by Lieutenant Joel S. Kennard. On the morning of March 19, Isondiga accompanied the ironclad CSS Atlanta down St. Augustine Creek to the entrance to Wassaw Sound with intentions of soon attacking the vessels of the Union blockade. However, low water levels prevented Atlanta from entering Wassaw Sound, and after waiting for days, the Confederates gave up. Atlanta ran aground while trying to leave, and Isondiga, the gunboat CSS Savannah, and the receiving ship CSS Sampson had to help free her. On May 30, another attempt was made to get Atlanta down to Wassaw Sound for an attack against the blockade, but she suffered engine failure and ran aground. Isondiga, CSS Oconee (the renamed Savannah), and the steamer CSS Resolute, attempted unsuccessfully to free Atlanta. The rising tide eventually freed Atlanta, which moved downstream to Thunderbolt, Georgia. Isondiga was sent down to watch Wassaw Sound as a signal vessel for two days.

On the evening of June 15, Isondiga, Resolute, and Atlanta began from Thunderbolt to confront the Union monitors USS Weehawken and USS Nahant. The Confederate naval elements in the Savannah area were under the command of Commander William A. Webb. Webb's plan was for Atlanta to sink one monitor with a spar torpedo and then defeat the other with close-range cannon fire; the naval historian Robert M. Browning describes this plan as "both daring and desperate". Isondiga and Resolute stayed well behind Atlanta. It was rumored afterwards that the two vessels carried a number of spectators, but Melton notes that this claim is not supported by evidence from the Savannah Squadron. The fight occurred on June 17. While maneuvering for the attack, Atlanta ran aground. A shot from Weehawken injured the pilot and helmsman of the Confederate vessel, and after a brief, lopsided fight in which the monitors fired a total of only five shots, Atlanta surrendered. Isondiga and Resolute fled back upriver.

With Webb a prisoner of war, Kennard took command of the Confederate vessels around Savannah until Captain William Wallace Hunter took command on June 28, returning Kennard to command of Isondiga. In August, Kennard and over 50 of Isondiga's officers and men were transferred to Charleston, South Carolina, which was the target of active Union operations, requiring Isondiga to be taken from active service for a time. Kennard and his men were later returned to the Savannah Squadron. During September, the transfer of more sailors to Charleston required another brief period of inactive status for Isondiga. This shortage of sailors was resolved by taking fifty inexperienced men from a receiving ship at Charleston, CSS Indian Chief, and sending them to Savannah to crew Isondiga. These men were inexperienced with sailing, so Hunter sent Isondiga to the Savannah River for training. Kennard noted that there were insufficient experienced men aboard to hold target practice. Kennard also had difficulties with the ship's executive officer, Lieutenant Aeneas Armstrong, who would take leave from the ship without orders, be inattentative to affairs on the ship, and get drunk. Armstrong was eventually replaced with Lieutenant Sidney McAdam.

In January 1864, the Confederate States Army was concerned that Union forces might strike inland towards Savannah from Port Royal, South Carolina, and asked for naval support of land defenses. Isondiga's crew had been returned from Charleston by this time, and Isondiga and the ironclad CSS Savannah were positioned near Elba Island in order to cover both obstructions in the Savannah River and a river landing. On January 26, Isondiga was sent down St. Augustine Creek in order to protect a bridge and an area known as the Wilmington Narrows, but returned to Elba Island when no Union encroachment there occurred. On February 23, Isondiga and Savannah were sent down St. Augustine Creek. The ironclad ran aground, but Isondiga continued down to Causton's Bluff. Isondiga returned to Savannah for repairs later, but was then sent back to Causton's Bluff, to assist in the defense of Fort Bartow. By mid-year, Isondiga had become, in the words of historian Maurice Melton, "almost a permanent part of the defenses at Causton's Bluff".

On June 2, Kennard was reassigned to command the gunboat CSS Macon. Since Macon required more time to complete fitting out, and needed more officers before she could enter active service, Kennard also held the command of Isondiga for the rest of the month, although much of the day-to-day supervision was done by McAdam. Permanent command of Isondiga went to Lieutenant Hamilton Dalton. In early September, Union army troops commanded by Major General William T. Sherman captured Atlanta, Georgia, and then began the March to the Sea, which would end at Savannah. On December 13, Fort McAllister, which had protected Savannah from Union naval forces, was captured by Sherman's men. On December 14, Isondiga was upriver on the Savannah River from the city of Savannah, and was firing on Union positions. Not long afterwards, men from Isondiga were slated to attempt a boat attack to retake Argyle Island, but this was cancelled as it was expected to result in heavy Confederate casualties. On December 18, Hunter ordered Isondiga and the tender CSS Firefly to either escape upriver to Augusta, Georgia, or to try to escape to the open sea.

A bridge ran from one bank of the Savannah River to Hutchinson Island, and the Confederates had constructed a pontoon bridge from the island to the other bank of the river to provide an escape path from Savannah. The Confederate army commander at Savannah was Lieutenant General William J. Hardee, and on his request, Isondiga was positioned upriver from the pontoon bridge to protect it. With both Isondiga and Savannah guarding the bridge, the Union did not interfere with the crossing. This crossing began late on December 20. It was hoped that Isondiga, Savannah, and Macon could somehow fight their way through the Union blockade, escape the Savannah area, and make it to either Charleston, Wilmington, North Carolina, or Georgetown, South Carolina. After the crossing was complete, the bridge was destroyed and Isondiga steamed downriver, but ran aground in the process. She was burned on Dalton's orders on December 21.

== Sources ==
- Browning, Robert M. (2002). Success Is All That Was Expected: The South Atlantic Blockading Squadron During the Civil War. Dulles, Virginia: Potomac Books. ISBN 1-57488-705-X.
- Canney, Donald L. (2015). The Confederate Steam Navy 1861–1865. Atglen, Pennsylvania: Schiffer. ISBN 978-0-7643-4824-2.
- Luraghi, Raimondo (1996). A History of the Confederate Navy. Annapolis, Maryland: Naval Institute Press. ISBN 1-55750-527-6.
- Melton, Maurice (2012). The Best Station of Them All: The Savannah Squadron, 1861–1865. Tuscaloosa, Alabama: University of Alabama Press. ISBN 978-0-8173-1763-8.
- Official Records of the Union and Confederate Navies in the War of the Rebellion, Series 2. U. S. Naval War Records Office. Office memoranda. Vol. 1. Washington, D.C.: Government Printing Office. 1921. ISBN 978-0-918678-30-0. OCLC 5194016.
