= List of shipwrecks in February 1865 =

The list of shipwrecks in February 1865 includes ships sunk, foundered, wrecked, grounded, or otherwise lost during February 1865.

== 1 February ==
List of shipwrecks: 1 February 1865
Ship	State	Description
Arno	United Kingdom	The ship was driven ashore at Seaham, County Durham. Her crew survived. She was on a voyage from Sunderland to Seaham.
Ellen	United Kingdom	The ship was wrecked at Alexandria, Egypt with the loss of three of her crew.
Sarah Maria	United Kingdom	The schooner sprang a leak and foundered in the Atlantic Ocean (38°15′N 10°00′W). Her crew were rescued by the schooner Paulina (United Kingdom). Sara Maria was on a voyage from Cardiff, Glamorgan to Sulina, Ottoman Empire.
Susan	United Kingdom	The schooner was driven ashore and sank at Newcastle, County Down. Her crew were rescued by the Newcastle Lifeboat. She was on a voyage from Bangor, County Down to the Clyde.
Victoria	United Kingdom	The ketch ran aground on the Little Gore Sand, in the Bristol Channel and was abandoned by her crew. She was on a voyage from Newport, Monmouthshire to Highbridge, Somerset. She floated of and sank off Mare Point, Somerset.

== 2 February ==
List of shipwrecks: 2 February 1865
Ship	State	Description
Ailsa Craig, and Deerfoot	United Kingdom	The steamship Ailsa Craig and the barque Deerfoot collided in the Straits of Gibraltar. Ailsa Craig sank off Cabrita Point, Spain. Her crew were rescued. She was on a voyage from Burriana, Spain to Liverpool, Lancashire. Deerfoot sank with the loss of a crew member. She was on a voyage from Cardiff, Glamorgan to Smyrna, Ottoman Empire.
Athanasian	United Kingdom	A fire on board the steamship caused by the explosion of a cask of benzoin killed three crew and injured two at Havre de Grâce, Seine-Inférieure. France.
Cosmopolitan	Denmark	The brig was driven ashore at Arrigo de la Miel, 9 nautical miles (17 km) west of Málaga, Spain, She was on a voyage from Çeşme, Ottoman Empire to Stettin.
Isis	United Kingdom	The schooner was driven ashore at Seaham, County Durham.
Leander	United Kingdom	The fishing smack was abandoned in the North Sea off Thorpeness, Suffolk. Her crew were rescued by a yawl and the Thorpeness Lifeboat Ipswich ( Royal National Lifeboat Institution).
Leda	France	The schooner was driven into the pier at St. Mary's, Isles of Scilly, United Kingdom. She was on a voyage from Preston, Lancashire, United Kingdom to Nantes, Loire-Inférieure.
Leila	United Kingdom	The East Indiaman foundered in the North Sea off the coast of Caithness with the loss of all 29 people on board. She was on her maiden voyage, from the River Tyne to Calcutta, India.
Odell	United Kingdom	The ship struck rocks off Jersey, Channel Islands. She put in to Jersey in a leaky condition.
Skane	Sweden	The ship collided with Richard Robinson (United States) and foundered in the Atlantic Ocean. Her crew were rescued by Richard Robinson. Skane was on a voyage from Newcastle upon Tyne, Northumberland, United Kingdom to Cape Town, Cape Colony.
Volunteer	United Kingdom	The steamship was wrecked at Filey, Yorkshire. Her crew were rescued. She was on a voyage from Rotterdam, South Holland, Netherlands to Leith, Lothian.

== 3 February ==
List of shipwrecks: 3 February 1865
Ship	State	Description
Earl Percy	United Kingdom	The steamship was driven ashore and wrecked at Tynemouth, Northumberland. All on board were rescued by the South Shields lifeboats Providence and two other lifeboats (all Royal National Lifeboat Institution) and a boat from Tynemouth. Earl Percy was on a voyage from Hamburg to Newcastle upon Tyne, Northumberland.
Ellen Brown	United Kingdom	The paddle tug sank off Coquet Island, Northumberland.
Fadersminde	Sweden	The ship was driven ashore at Dysart, Fife, United Kingdom. Her crew were rescued. She was on a voyage from Leith, Lothian, United Kingdom to Dysart.
Gazelle	United Kingdom	The ship collided with Nelly (Bremen) and foundered off Cape de Gatt, Spain with the loss of four of her five crew. The survivor was rescued by Nelly. Gazelle was on a voyage from Valencia, Spain to Leith.
Wasa	(Russian Empire) Grand Duchy of Finland	The barque ran aground on the Herd Sand, in the North Sea off the coast of County Durham. She was refloated and towed in to South Shields.

== 4 February ==
List of shipwrecks: 4 February 1865
Ship	State	Description
Apollo	United Kingdom	The schooner was driven ashore and wrecked at Pakefield, Suffolk. Her six crew were rescued. She was on a voyage from Queenborough, Kent to South Shields, County Durham.
Artemas	United Kingdom	The ship ran aground on the Stamford Sandbank, in the North Sea off the coast of Suffolk and was abandoned. Her crew were rescued by a yawl. She was on a voyage from Hartlepool, County Durham to London. She drove on to the Newcombe Sand and sank.
Elena	United Kingdom	The barque was wrecked at "Abonsistown" with the loss of three of her crew. She was on a voyage from Newcastle upon Tyne, Northumberland to Alexandria, Egypt.
Elizabeth Wilthew	United Kingdom	The brig was abandoned in the North Sea. She was then driven ashore and wrecked at West Hartlepool, County Durham.
Faithful	United Kingdom	The barque foundered off Marettimo, Sicily, Italy with the loss of a crew member. She was on a voyage from Palermo, Sicily to Leith, Lothian.
Geschweister	Hamburg	The ship ran aground at Bremerhaven. She was on a voyage from Hamburg to Bremen. She was refloated the next day.
Jim Barkman	Confederate States of America	American Civil War: The 65-ton sternwheel paddle steamer was captured and burned on the Ouachita River in Louisiana by the 4th and 5th Illinois Cavalry Regiments.
Marathon	United Kingdom	The steamship was abandoned off the Cordouan Lighthouse. Her crew were rescued. She was on a voyage from South Shields to Bordeaux, Gironde, France. Marathon was subsequently towed in to Bordeaux by the steamship Cecile (France).
Neuvorpommern	Stralsund	The ship was driven ashore near Lemvig, Norway. She was on a voyage from Newcastle upon Tyne, Northumberland, United Kingdom to Stralsund.
Unidentified blockade runner	Confederate States of America	American Civil War, Union blockade: The blockade runner was aground at Breach Inlet, South Carolina, when the schooner USS Potomska and the gunboat USS Wamsutta (both United States Navy) sighted her. Her crew then burned and abandoned her.

== 5 February ==
List of shipwrecks: 5 February 1865
Ship	State	Description
Charlotte	United States	The schooner was lost at the mouth of the Klamath River on the Pacific coast of northern California.
Constante	Portugal	The ship was driven ashore and wrecked on São Miguel Island, Azores. Her crew were rescued.
Kate	United Kingdom	The ship was driven ashore and wrecked on São Miguel Island with the loss of a crew member.
Magnetic	United Kingdom	The steamship ran aground in the River Mersey. She was on a voyage from Belfast, County Antrim to Liverpool, Lancashire.
Robert Lee	United States	The 68-ton sternwheel paddle steamer burned on the Ohio River at Louisville, Kentucky, with the loss of three lives.
True Blue	(United Kingdom of Great Britain and Ireland) Jersey	The ship was abandoned in the Mediterranean Sea on or about 5 February. She was on a voyage from Ancona, Papal States to a British port. She was towed in to Malta in a waterlogged condition with a dead crew member on board on 16 February by Laconia (United Kingdom).
United Friends	United Kingdom	The smack was run down and sunk at the mouth of the River Mersey by RMS China (United Kingdom). Both crew were rescued by the tug Sea King (United Kingdom).

== 6 February ==
List of shipwrecks: 5-6 February 1865
Ship	State	Description
Acadia	United Kingdom	American Civil War, Union blockade: Trying to run the Union blockade into Velasco, Texas, the 738-bulk-ton sidewheel paddle steamer was wrecked on the coast of Texas about 6 miles (10 km) east-northeast of Velasco. The mortar gunboat USS Virginia (United States Navy) shelled her but was unable to launch a boat crew to board and burn her because of rough seas.
Albanian	United Kingdom	The brig sank off Pointe de Coubre, France. Her crew were rescued. She was on a voyage from Sunderland, County Durham to Bordeaux, Gironde, France.
Arago	United States	The 268-ton sidewheel paddle steamer was sunk by ice in the Mississippi River at Dog Tooth Bend at Commerce, Missouri. The portion of the ship remaining above water caught fire.
Favorita	United States	Steamer City of Port-au-Prince ran into and sunk the pilot boat Favorite on 6 February 1865, about 17 miles east southeast from Barnegat Lighthouse.
Tiber	United Kingdom	The steamship was driven ashore at Barber's Point, in the Dardanelles. She was on a voyage from Liverpool, Lancashire to Constantinople, Ottoman Empire. She was later refloated and taken in to Constantinople, where she collided with an Ottoman Navy frigate.

== 7 February ==
List of shipwrecks: 7 February 1865
Ship	State	Description
Adler	Bremen	The steamship ran aground off "Scottwarden". She was on a voyage from Hull, Yorkshire, United Kingdom to Bremen. She was refloated the next day and taken in to Bremerhaven.
Elizabeth	Norway	The ship ran aground on the Corton Sand, in the North Sea off the coast of Suffolk, United Kingdom. She was refloated and assisted in to Great Yarmouth, Norfolk, United Kingdom.
Lexington	United Kingdom	The barque ran aground on the Salthouse Bank, in the Irish Sea off the coast of Lancashire. Her crew were rescued by the Blackpool and Southport Lifeboats. She was on a voyage from Nassau, Bahamas to Liverpool, Lancashire. She was refloated the next day and towed in to Liverpool by the tug Rattler
Mauve	Netherlands	The ship ran aground on the Scheelhoek, off the Dutch coast. She was on a voyage from Simon's Bay to Rotterdam, South Holland. she was refloated and towed in to Rotterdam.
Sultan	United Kingdom	The schooner was wrecked on the Devil's Back. She was on a voyage from Halifax, Nova Scotia, British North America to Boston, Massachusetts, United States.

== 8 February ==
List of shipwrecks: 8 February 1865
Ship	State	Description
Crimean	United Kingdom	The steamship was driven ashore at Pelican Point, Ottoman Empire. She was on a voyage from Smyrna, Ottoman Empire to Liverpool, Lancashire. She was refloated on 10 February.
Eugenie	Prussia	The ship was wrecked at Crackington Haven, Cornwall, United Kingdom. Her sixteen crew were rescued. She was on a voyage from Bude, Cornwall to Swansea, Glamorgan, United Kingdom.
Hawk	United Kingdom	The ship was driven ashore at Stiffkey, Norfolk. She was on a voyage from Odense, Denmark to Queenstown, County Cork.
Marshland	United Kingdom	The steamship ran aground on the Fyeler Sand, in the North Sea. She was on a voyage from Hull, Yorkshire to Geestemünde. She was refloated and completed her voyage.
Mittwoch	Danzig	The ship ran aground on the Lapsand, in the Baltic Sea. She was on a voyage from Danzig to South Shields, County Durham and/or Newcastle upon Tyne, Northumberland, United Kingdom. She was refloated and taken in to Helsingør, Denmark for repairs.
Union	United States	The barque was abandoned in the Atlantic Ocean (42°23′N 25°40′W). Her crew were rescued by Christian Rankin (United Kingdom). Union was on a voyage from Cette, Hérault to New York.
Victoire	France	The schooner was driven ashore and wrecked at Stiffkey, Norfolk, United Kingdom. She was on a voyage from Middlesbrough, Yorkshire, United Kingdom to Dunkirk, Nord. She was refloated on 27 February and towed in to Great Yarmouth, Norfolk.
Windermere	United Kingdom	The barque was wrecked at Madeira.

== 9 February ==
List of shipwrecks: 9 February 1865
Ship	State	Description
Adriatico	United Kingdom	The steamship ran aground on the "Isole dello Corsento", Italy. She was on a voyage from Malta to Messina, Sicily, Italy.
Alexandrine	United Kingdom	The brig collided with the full-rigged ship Amazone (Prussia) and sank off Barry, Glamorgan.
Ann	United Kingdom	The fishing smack ran aground on the Newcombe Sand, in the North Sea off the coast of Suffolk. She was refloated and assisted in to Lowestoft, Suffolk in a leaky condition.
Byzantium	United Kingdom	The barque was wrecked on the Gunfleet Sand, in the North Sea off the coast of Essex. Her crew were rescued by Marco Polo and Volunteer (both United Kingdom). Byzantium was on a voyage from South Shields, County Durham to Alexandria, Egypt.
Duisberg	Prussia	The full-rigged ship was driven ashore on Sharps Island, Maryland, United States. She was on a voyage from Genoa, Italy to Baltimore, Maryland. She was refloated and taken in to Baltimore.
Duke of Roxburgh	United Kingdom	The ship was driven ashore and sank at Alexandria, Egypt. Her crew were rescued.
Kent	United Kingdom	The schooner was driven ashore at Dungeness, Kent. She was on a voyage from Chepstow Monmouthshire to Woolwich, Kent.
Margaret Reed	United Kingdom	The schooner ran aground on the Abertay Sand. She was refloated.
Mary Fleming	United Kingdom	The ship was wrecked at Abbassia, Egypt. She was on a voyage from Newcastle upon Tyne, Northumberland to Alexandria.

== 10 February ==
List of shipwrecks: 9-10 February 1865
Ship	State	Description
Bertha	Belgium	The fishing smack foundered in the North Sea 40 nautical miles (74 km) east of the Galloper Sand. Her crew were rescued.
Duchess of Portland	United Kingdom	The snow ran aground on the Middle Sand, in the North Sea off the coast of Essex and was abandoned by her crew. She was on a voyage from South Shields, County Durham to London. She was refloated by two smacks and taken in to Sheerness, Kent.
Swansea	United Kingdom	The pilot boat sank at Ilfracombe, Devon.
Teresa	Spain	The brig was wrecked on Cayo Cruz del Padre, off the coast of Cuba.
Viaggiatore	Italy	The ship was wrecked off "Isola Grossa". She was on a voyage from "Santorino" to Pola, Austrian Empire.
Will o′ the Wisp	Confederate States of America	American Civil War, Union blockade: Carrying a cargo of provisions and small arms, the 117-register ton sidewheel paddle steamer was chased ashore and riddled with gunfire by United States Navy warships on the coast of Texas a few miles southwest of Galveston. A boat expedition from the armed screw steamers USS Antona and USS Princess Royal (both United States Navy) boarded her and set her on fire, and her hold filled with sand.

== 11 February ==
List of shipwrecks: 11 February 1865
Ship	State	Description
David	United Kingdom	The schooner was driven ashore at Aberdeen with the loss of a crew member. she was on a voyage from Aberdeen to Sunderland, County Durham.
Eagle Wing	United States	The medium clipper departed from Boston, Massachusetts for Bombay, India. No further trace, presumed foundered with the loss of all hands.
Johann Lange	Netherlands	The ship departed from Padang, Netherlands East Indies for a Dutch port. No further trace, presumed foundered with the loss of all hands.
Mary	United Kingdom	The ship was driven ashore at Campbeltown, Argyllshire. She was on a voyage from Glenarm, County Antrim to Glasgow, Renfrewshire.
Providence	United Kingdom	The ship ran aground on the Herd Sand, in the North Sea off the coast of County Durham and sank. She was on a voyage from South Shields, County Durham to Jersey, Channel Islands.

== 12 February ==
List of shipwrecks: 12 February 1865
Ship	State	Description
Brandy	United Kingdom	The barque was wrecked near Wexford with the loss of thirteen of the 28 people on board.
Dart	United Kingdom	The smack was driven ashore at "Borthfaur". She was on a voyage from Barmouth, Merionethshire to Liverpool, Lancashire. She was refloated on 24 February and taken in to Abersoch, Caernarfonshire.
Ethel	United Kingdom	The brig ran aground on the Goodwin Sands, Kent. She was on a voyage from Dieppe, Seine-Inférieure, France to Bo'ness, Lothian. She was refloated but was consequently beached at Walmer Castle, Kent. Ethel was refloated on 17 February and towed in to Ramsgate, Kent.
John Peile	Hamburg	The ship was driven ashore near the Kugelbake. She was on a voyage from Callao, Peru to Hamburg. She was refloated and taken in to Cuxhaven.
Mary Ann	United Kingdom	The smack was run ashore near Abersoch, Caernarfonshire. She was on a voyage from Barmouth, Merionethshire to Liverpool, Lancashire.

== 13 February ==
List of shipwrecks: 13 February 1865
Ship	State	Description
Anne	United Kingdom	The ship was driven ashore at Mizen Heand, County Cork. Her crew were rescued. She was on a voyage from Liverpool, Lancashire to Málaga, Spain.
Anne Jane	United Kingdom	The ship was driven ashore in Whiting Bay, Isle of Arran. She was on a voyage from Greenock, Renfrewshire to Demerara, British Guiana. She was later refloated and towed in to Greenock.
Leocadie	France	The brig struck a sunken rock. She was towed in to Saint-Nazaire, Loire-Inférieure, where she sank. She was refloated.
Unidentified wharf boat	United States	Carrying 11,000 sacks of grain, the wharf boat sank in the Mississippi River at Memphis, Tennessee.

== 14 February ==
List of shipwrecks: 14 February 1865
Ship	State	Description
Ariel	(United Kingdom of Great Britain and Ireland) Jersey	The ship was driven ashore at Messina, Sicily, Italy. She was on a voyage from Naples, Italy to Gallipoli, Ottoman Empire.
Borneo	United States	The ship was discovered abandoned in the Atlantic Ocean by Claudra (United Kingdom) and was boarded. She foundered with the loss of one life.
Celt	Confederate States of America	The wreck of SS Celt in 1865. American Civil War, Union blockade: The sidewheel paddle steamer, a blockade runner carrying a cargo of cotton, ran aground off Sullivan's Island while trying to leave Charleston Harbor, South Carolina. Her wreck was captured by the monitor USS Catskill (United States Navy) on 18 February.
Nereid	United Kingdom	The ship ran aground on the Tony Rock Bar, in the Bahamas and was wrecked. She was on a voyage from Nassau, Bahamas to Liverpool, Lancashire.
Saltmarsh	United Kingdom	The schooner was run into by the steamship London (United Kingdom) and sank at Vlissingen, Zeeland, Netherlands with the loss of her captain. She was on a voyage from Antwerp, Belgium to Wisbech, Cambridgeshire.

== 15 February ==
List of shipwrecks: 15 February 1865
Ship	State	Description
Black Prince	United States	The clipper was supplied with provisions by the schooner Eliza (United Kingdom) in the Atlantic Ocean (38°00′N 67°54′W). No further trace, presumed foundered with the loss of all 25 crew. Black Prince was on a voyage from San Francisco, California to Boston, Massachusetts.
Charlotte	United Kingdom	The schooner struck the Ebb Rock, off the coast of Pembrokeshire and was abandoned by her crew. She was on a voyage from Londonderry to Cardiff, Glamorgan. She came ashore at Pant Glas and was wrecked.
Clarence	United Kingdom	The ship was driven into King of Denmark (Denmark) at Nassau, Bahamas She was holed by that ship's anchor and sank.
Cubana	United Kingdom	The ship was wrecked off Hog Island, Bahamas. She was on a voyage from Nassau to Havana, Cuba.
Elina	United Kingdom	The schooner ran aground at Cairnbulg, Aberdeenshire. She was on a voyage from Inverness to Dundee, Forfarshire. She was refloated and taken in to Fraserburgh, Aberdeenshire in a severely leaky condition.
Enterprise	United Kingdom	The ship ran aground at Peterhead, Aberdeenshire. She was on a voyage from Burghead, Moray to Hartlepool, County Durham.
Knickerbocker	United States	American Civil War: Aground since 4 January near Smith's Point, Virginia, the 858-ton sidewheel paddle steamer was boarded and burned by Confederate forces.
USS Merrimac	United States Navy	American Civil War: The sidewheel gunboat foundered in the North Atlantic Ocean off Florida at 29°11′N 79°12′W. The mail steamer Morning Star (flag unknown) rescued her crew.
Voltigeur	United Kingdom	The tug sank in the River Mersey off Tranmere, Cheshire.

== 16 February ==
List of shipwrecks: 16 February 1865
Ship	State	Description
Aden	Norway	The ship capsized off the North Foreland, Kent, United Kingdom. She was on a voyage from Cagliari, Sardinia, Italy to Bergen.
Aufredy	United Kingdom	The ship ran aground on Scroby Sands, Norfolk. She was on a voyage from London to Newcastle upon Tyne, Northumberland. She was refloated and taken in to Great Yarmouth, Norfolk.
Conway	United Kingdom	The ship was driven ashore at Eccles-on-Sea, Norfolk. She was refloated and taken in to Great Yarmouth.
Eliza Ann	United Kingdom	The schooner was abandoned in the Atlantic Ocean. Her crew were rescued by the brig Mississippi (United States). Eliza Ann was on a voyage from New York, United States to Matamoros, Mexico.
Louisa	Confederate States of America	American Civil War, Union blockade: The schooner, a blockade runner with a cargo of baggage, cordage, wines, and crockery, was forced aground on the coast of Texas at Aransas Pass by the gunboat USS Penobscot (United States Navy), which then sank her in shallow water with gunfire. A boat crew from Penobscot completed her destruction by burning her on 18 February.
Mary Agnes	Confederate States of America	American Civil War, Union blockade: The schooner, a blockade runner with a cargo of baggage, cordage, wines, and crockery, was forced aground on the coast of Texas at Aransas Pass by the gunboat USS Penobscot (United States Navy). A boat crew from Penobscot burned her on 18 February.
Sir George Brown	United Kingdom	The brig ran aground on the Shipwash Sand, in the North Sea off the coast of Suffolk. She was on a voyage from London to Dundee, Forfarshire. She was refloated and resumed her voyage.
Stokesby	United Kingdom	The steamship departed from Glasgow, Renfrewshire for Porto, Portugal. Presumed subsequently foundered with the loss of all eighteen crew; two boats belonging to the ship came ashore at Newquay, Cornwall on 23 February.

== 17 February ==
List of shipwrecks: 17 February 1865
Ship	State	Description
Amana	United Kingdom	The barque was driven ashore and wrecked near Cley-next-the-Sea, Norfolk. Her thirteen crew were rescued by the Blakeney Lifeboat. She was on a voyage from Sunderland, County Durham to Savona, Italy.
Auckland	United Kingdom	The barque was wrecked at Blakeney, Norfolk. Her seventeen crew were rescued by the Blakeney Lifeboat.
Blakeney Lifeboat	Royal National Lifeboat Institution	The lifeboat was wrecked at Blakeney.
Butterfly	United Kingdom	The ship was driven ashore at Sheringham, Norfolk.
Celia M. Carver	United States	The brigantine was driven ashore at Bridgwater, Somerset, United Kingdom. She was on a voyage from London to Newport, Monmouthshire, United Kingdom.
East Anglian	United Kingdom	The steamship ran aground on the Nore. She was on a voyage from Liverpool, Lancashire to London. She was refloated.
Faithful	United Kingdom	The barque was driven ashore near Sheringham.
Minniehaha	United States	The ship was abandoned in the Atlantic Ocean. She was on a voyage from Baltimore, Maryland to Beaufort, North Carolina, Confederate States of America.
Zephyr	United Kingdom	The ship was driven ashore at Sea Palling, Norfolk. She was refloated and towed in to Great Yarmouth, Norfolk.

== 18 February ==
List of shipwrecks: 18 February 1865
Ship	State	Description
Albion	United Kingdom	The ship was driven ashore and wrecked at Lowestoft, Suffolk. She was on a voyage from Middlesbrough, Yorkshire to Rochester, Kent.
Anna Dale	Confederate States of America	American Civil War, Union blockade: The armed schooner, a Confederate privateer, was boarded and burned at Pass Cavallo, Texas, by a boat crew from the gunboat USS Pinola (United States Navy).
CSS Charleston	Confederate States Navy	American Civil War: The casemate ironclad ram was stripped, burned, and blown up with 20 short tons (18.1 metric tons/tonnes) of gunpowder in the Cooper River at Charleston, South Carolina, while anchored below the Drum Island Pleasant Ferry Wharf at 32°47′29″N 79°55′21″W to prevent her capture by Union forces.
CSS Chicora	Confederate States Navy	American Civil War: The casemate ironclad ram was stripped, burned, and blown up in Charleston Harbor, in the Cooper River below Drum's Island off Marshall's Wharf to prevent her capture by Union forces.
Dalhousie	United Kingdom	The steamship departed from Glasgow, Renfrewshire for Gibraltar. No further trace, presumed foundered with the loss of all 22 crew.
Deer	United Kingdom	American Civil War, Union blockade: The steamer, a blockade runner, ran aground at Charleston and was captured by the monitor USS Catskill (United States Navy).
Dorothea	United Kingdom	The schooner foundered in the North Sea. Her crew were rescued by the barque Defender (United Kingdom).
CSS Eagle	Confederate States Navy	American Civil War: The receiving ship was scuttled in Charleston Harbor, on 17 or 18 February to prevent her capture by Union forces.
Hephzibah	United Kingdom	The ship was driven ashore at Kenfig, Glamorgan. Her crew were rescued. She was on a voyage from Tampico, Mexico to Liverpool, Lancashire.
CSS Indian Chief	Confederate States Navy	American Civil War: The schooner, serving as a receiving ship, was burned on Town Creek in Charleston Harbor to prevent her capture by Union forces.
Lady Brisbane	United Kingdom	The steamship ran aground in the River Clyde. She was refloated.
CSS Palmetto State	Confederate States Navy	American Civil War: The casemate ironclad ram was stripped, burned, and blown up at a wharf on the Cooper River at Charleston to prevent her capture by Union forces.
CSS Peedee	Confederate States Navy	American Civil War: The gunboat was destroyed by Confederate forces on the Pee Dee River in South Carolina 110 nautical miles (200 km) above Georgetown to prevent her capture by Union forces.
San Francesco di Paolo e da Fortuna	Italy	The mistico was wrecked at Castello, Sardinia. She was on a voyage from Catania, Sicily to Malta.
Windermere	United Kingdom	The ship was abandoned in the Atlantic Ocean. Her crew survived.
Two unidentified ironclads	Confederate States of America	American Civil War: The two incomplete ironclads, one afloat and one still on the building ways, were burned by Confederate forces at Charleston, to prevent their capture by Union forces.

== 19 February ==
List of shipwrecks: 19 February 1865
Ship	State	Description
CSS A. H. Schultz	Confederate States Navy	American Civil War: The 164-ton sidewheel paddle steamer struck a Confederate mine that had drifted from its original position on the James River in Virginia near Chapin's Bluff and sank in five minutes with the loss of four lives.
Faithful	United Kingdom	The ship foundered in the North Sea with some loss of life.
Flying Fish	United Kingdom	The smack collided with the smack J. H. (United Kingdom) and foundered in the North Sea 120 nautical miles (220 km) off Spurn Point, Yorkshire. Her crew were rescued by Romp (United Kingdom).
Gleaner	United Kingdom	The brig foundered in the North Sea off Filey, Yorkshire with the loss of all hands.
John Fergus	United Kingdom	The schooner ran aground on the Lady Bank, off Monifieth, Forfarshire. She was refloated.
Kate	United Kingdom	The ship was in collision with Atalanta (United Kingdom) in the North Sea off Caister-on-Sea, Norfolk and was abandoned by her crew. Kate consequently sank. She was on a voyage from Newcastle upon Tyne, Northumberland to London. She consequently sank off Great Yarmouth.
Mary Jane	United Kingdom	The schooner sank in Ramsey Bay. She was on a voyage from Barrow in Furness, Lancashire to Maryport, Cumberland.
Richard	United Kingdom	The ship was abandoned in the English Channel off Bournemouth, Hampshire. She was on a voyage from Cardiff, Glamorgan to Ryde, Isle of Wight. She was taken in to Poole, Dorset on 21 February.
Rose	United Kingdom	The ship ran aground on the Haisborough Sands, in the North Sea off the coast of Norfolk. She was refloated and taken in to Great Yarmouth in a leaky condition.
William Allison	Confederate States of America	American Civil War: Carrying a cargo of blankets, the 304-ton sidewheel paddle steamer was sunk accidentally by a Confederate mine in the James River off Cox's Ferry, Virginia.
Unnamed	United Kingdom	The schooner foundered off Filey with the loss of all hands.

== 20 February ==
List of shipwrecks: 20 February 1865
Ship	State	Description
Albion	United Kingdom	The schooner was abandoned off Fishguard, Pembrokeshire. Her crew were rescued by the Fishguard Lifeboat Sir Edward Perrott ( Royal National Lifeboat Institution). Albion was on a voyage from Runcorn, Cheshire to Teignmouth, Devon. She subsequently drove ashore and was wrecked.
Blue Jacket	United Kingdom	The yawl foundered in the North Sea with the loss of all nine crew.
Briton	United Kingdom	The smack foundered in the North Sea.
Emma	United Kingdom	The schooner was abandoned off Fishguard. Her crew were rescued by the Fishguard Lifeboat Sir Edward Perrott ( Royal National Lifeboat Institution).
Gilbert Alphonse	France	The ship was driven ashore and wrecked at Corton, Suffolk, United Kingdom. Her crew were rescued by the Coast Guard using rocket apparatus. She was on a voyage from Blyth, Northumberland, United Kingdom to Caen, Calvados.
Kate	United Kingdom	The brig was run down and sunk off Caister-on-Sea, Norfolk. Her seven crew were rescued. She was on a voyage from London to South Shields, County Durham.
Matchless	United Kingdom	The yawl was abandoned off Craigleith, in the Firth of Forth. Her three crew were rescued by the Berwick Lifeboat.
Rose	United Kingdom	The yawl foundered in the North Sea with the loss of all nine crew.
Rosebud	United Kingdom	The brigantine ran aground on the Shingles, in the Solent. She was on a voyage from Newcastle upon Tyne, Northumberland to Llanelly, Glamorgan. She was refloated and taken in to Yarmouth, Isle of Wight in a leaky condition.
Stork	United Kingdom	The ship collided with Allison and was abandoned in the North Sea off the coast of Essex. Her crew were rescued by Allison. Stork was on a voyage from North Shields, Northumberland to London. She was taken in to Ramsgate, Kent in a derelict condition.
Thames	(United Kingdom of Great Britain and Ireland) New Zealand	The brig was wrecked on the Canterbury coast while transporting telegraph poles from Marlborough.
Thomas and Margaret	United Kingdom	The ship was driven ashore at West Hartlepool, County Durham with the loss of all nine crew.
Thomas and Margaret	United Kingdom	The yawl was driven ashore at Seaton Carew, County Durham with the loss of all nine crew.
William and Eliza	United Kingdom	The schooner was abandoned in the Atlantic Ocean 30 nautical miles (56 km) south south west of the Isles of Scilly. Her crew were rescued by the barque Ida (Russia). William and Eliza was on a voyage from Pomeron, Portugal to Gloucester.
Unnamed cutter	United States Navy	American Civil War: The cutter, from the gunboat USS Shawmut (United States Navy), was blown up by a Confederate floating mine on the Cape Fear River that had drifted down from Wilmington, North Carolina. Two men aboard the cutter were killed and two were wounded.

== 21 February ==
List of shipwrecks: 21 February 1865
Ship	State	Description
Ariel	United Kingdom	The ship ran aground on the Dutchman's Bank, in the Irish Sea off the coast of Lancashire. She was on a voyage from Bermuda to Liverpool, Lancashire. She was refloated and taken in to Liverpool.
Eugenie	United Kingdom	The steamship ran aground on the Krantsand, in the North Sea.
Ottawa	United Kingdom	The ship foundered in the North Sea 20 nautical miles (37 km) east of the Galloper Lightship ( Trinity House). Her crew were rescued by the brig Cambria (United Kingdom). Ottawa was on a voyage from South Shields, County Durham to Barcelona, Spain.
Thaise	France	The schooner was driven ashore and wrecked near Calais with the loss of all hands. She was on a voyage from Saint-Valery-sur-Somme, Somme to an English port.
Unnamed	United Kingdom	The brig foundered in the North Sea off Filey, Yorkshire with the loss of all hands.

== 22 February ==
List of shipwrecks: 22 February 1865
Ship	State	Description
Adolf	Belgium	The ship was run down and sunk in the North Sea 4 nautical miles (7.4 km) off Great Yarmouth, Norfolk, United Kingdom. Her crew were rescued.
B. S. Kimball	United States	The ship ran aground at Cuxhaven. She was on a voyage from Callao, Peru to Hamburg.
CSS Caswell	Confederate States Navy	American Civil War: The sidewheel tender was burned to prevent her capture by Union forces when Wilmington, North Carolina, fell to the Union.
Daring	(United Kingdom of Great Britain and Ireland) New Zealand	The 32-ton schooner ran aground several miles south of the mouth of the Kaipara Harbour. Attempts were made to refloat her, but a gale sprang up and she was wrecked. In May 2018, the wreck appeared out of the sand on the beach, and efforts were made to preserve it until it could be dug out. In December 2018, the almost intact wreck was lifted out and transported away for restoration.
Margaret Kerr	United Kingdom	The steamer ran aground on Crocker Reef, off the coast of Florida, confederate States of America and was wrecked. Her crew were rescued.
Plythe	United Kingdom	The collier sank at Rotterdam, South Holland, Netherlands.
Temora	United Kingdom	The steamship was driven ashore and wrecked at Fife Ness. All on board survived. She was on a voyage from London to Dundee, Forfarshire.
Triumvir	United Kingdom	The ship was abandoned in the North Sea. Her crew were rescued. She was on a voyage from Haugesund, Norway to Lowestoft, Suffolk. Triumvir was taken in to Grimsby, Lincolnshire in a derelict condition.

== 23 February ==
List of shipwrecks: 23 February 1865
Ship	State	Description
Alert	United Kingdom	The brig ran aground on the Sandhale, in the North Sea off the coast of Lincolnshire. She was on a voyage from London to South Shields, County Durham. She was refloated with assistance from the tug Lioness (United Kingdom) and was towed in to Grimsby, Lincolnshire in a leaky condition.
Black Diamond	United Kingdom	The steamship ran aground on the Haisborough Sands, in the North Sea off the coast of Norfolk. She was refloated the next day and resumed her voyage.
Corymbus	United Kingdom	The schooner struck the Plough Rock, in the Farne Islands, Northumberland and was consequently beached at Spittal Point, Northumberland. She was on a voyage from Sunderland, County Durham to Dundee, Forfarshire. Corymbus was refloated and taken in to Berwick upon Tweed, Northumberland.
Crown	United Kingdom	The barque was driven ashore at Egmond aan Zee, North Holland, Netherlands. She was on a voyage from Brazil to Amsterdam, North Holland. She was refloated the next day and taken in to the Nieuw Diep.
Dapper	United Kingdom	The brig collided with a brig and sank in the North Sea off Whitby, Yorkshire. Her crew survived. She was on a voyage from Sunderland, County Durham to Ipswich, Suffolk.
Dasher	United Kingdom	The smack ran aground on the Rock of Gore. She was refloated on 26 February.
Hannah Sturdy	United Kingdom	The ship was run down and sunk in the English Channel 15 nautical miles (28 km) off Beachy Head, Sussex by Giant's Causeway (United Kingdom). Her crew were rescued by Giant's Causeway. Hannah Sturdy was on a voyage from South Shields, County Durham to San Sebástian, Spain.
Isabella	United Kingdom	The ship ran aground off Winterton-on-Sea, Norfolk. She was on a voyage from Rouen, Seine-Inférieure, France to South Shields, County Durham. She was refloated and assisted in to Great Yarmouth, Norfolk.
Union	United Kingdom	The schooner was driven ashore at Aberdeen. She was on a voyage from East Wemyss, Fife to Aberdeen. She was refloated and towed in to Aberdeen.
Zephyr	United Kingdom	The steamship ran aground on the Shielhoek, off the coast of Zeeland, Netherlands. She was on a voyage from London to Rotterdam, South Holland, Netherlands.

== 24 February ==
List of shipwrecks: 24 February 1865
Ship	State	Description
Adelina	United Kingdom	The ship caught fire at Woosung, China.
Balaclava	United Kingdom	The steamship was driven ashore at Tacumshane, County Wexford. She was on a voyage from Woolwich, Kent to Liverpool, Lancashire.
Corymbus	United Kingdom	The ship struck the Plough Rocks, off the Farne Islands, Northumberland and was consequently beached at Spittal Point. She was on a voyage from Sunderland, County Durham to Dundee, Forfarshire. Corymbus was later refloated and taken in to Berwick upon Tweed, Northumberland.
David	United Kingdom	The schooner was wrecked on the Jadder, in the Baltic Sea. Her crew were rescued. She was on a voyage from Newcastle upon Tyne, Northumberland to Königsberg, Prussia.
Endeavour	United Kingdom	The ship was driven ashore and severely damaged at Bude, Cornwall. Her crew were rescued by rocket apparatus. She was on a voyage from "Port Gavern" to Bude.
I O	(United Kingdom of Great Britain and Ireland) South Australia	The schooner ran aground at Sydney, New South Wales.
Marlow	United Kingdom	The ship was driven ashore at Tara Point, County Antrim. She was refloated and towed in to the Belfast Lough.
Rosebud	United Kingdom	The schooner was driven ashore and wrecked in Dundrum Bay. Her crew were rescued.
Star Queen	United Kingdom	The steamship collided with the steamship Ellen Sinclair (United Kingdom) and was beached at Horsey, Norfolk. She was on a voyage from Dunkirk, Nord to West Hartlepool, County Durham.
Wild Horse	United Kingdom	The ship ran aground and was severely damaged at Yarmouth, Nova Scotia, British North America. She was on a voyage from the Clyde to Halifax, Nova Scotia.
Wyolme	United Kingdom	The galiot ran aground on the Sunk Sand, in the Humber. She was on a voyage from London to Hull, Yorkshire. She was refloated and assisted in to Grimsby, Lincolnshire.

== 25 February ==
List of shipwrecks: 25 February 1865
Ship	State	Description
Angelica	United Kingdom	The ship ran aground on the Kentish Knock. She was on a voyage from Newcastle upon Tyne, Northumberland to Constantinople, Ottoman Empire. She was refloated and towed in to Ramsgate, Kent in a leaky condition.
CSS Chickamauga	Confederate States Navy	American Civil War: The 586-ton armed screw steamer was burned by her crew and scuttled as a blockship on the Cape Fear River just below Indian Wells, North Carolina, and 50 nautical miles (93 km) above Wilmington, North Carolina.
Concordia	Norway	The brig ran aground at North Shields, Northumberland, United Kingdom and was damaged. She was placed under repair.
Giacomina	Austrian Empire	The barque sprang a leak and was beached at Candia, Crete, where she sank. She was on a voyage from Constantinople, Ottoman Empire to Marseille, Bouches-du-Rhône, France.
Medusa	United Kingdom	The ship was severely damaged by ice at Copenhagen, Denmark.

== 26 February ==
List of shipwrecks: 26 February 1865
Ship	State	Description
Anne Studgeon	United Kingdom	The ship was run down and sunk in the English Channel off the coast of Sussex by Giant's Causeway (United Kingdom). Her crew were rescued.
Gloriana	United Kingdom	The ship ran aground on the Holm Sand, in the North Sea off Lowestoft, Suffolk. She was on a voyage from South Shields, County Durham to Genoa, Italy. She was refloated the next day with the assistance of a steamship and taken in to Great Yarmouth, Norfolk.
Starbeam	United Kingdom	The brig ran aground at Sunderland, County Durham. She was on a voyage from Bordeaux, Gironde to Sunderland. She was refloated.
Tweed	United Kingdom	The brig ran aground on the Hew Ledge Rocks, Isle of Wight. She was on a voyage from South Shields to Exeter, Devon. She was refloated and taken in to Yarmouth, Isle of Wight in a leaky condition.
William	United Kingdom	The fishing boat was driven ashore and wrecked near Findhorn, Aberdeenshire with the loss of all hands.

== 27 February ==
List of shipwrecks: 27 February 1865
Ship	State	Description
USS Arizona	United States Navy	The sidewheel paddle steamer caught fire on the Mississippi River 38 miles (61 km) south of New Orleans, Louisiana, and was abandoned when the fire went out of control. After she was abandoned, she grounded on the west bank of the river, continued to burn, and finally exploded at 12:35 a.m. on 28 February. Four members of her crew were listed as missing; 94 survived.
Béarn	France	The paddle steamer ran aground and was wrecked at Punta de Castelhanos, Brazil. All on board were rescued.
Concepcion	Spain	The ship was wrecked at Matamoros, Mexico.
Constance Augustine	France	The sloop sank off the Heve. Her crew were rescued. She was on a voyage from Rouen to Havre de Grâce, Seine-Inférieure and Saint-Malo, Ille-et-Vilaine.
Spray	United States	Bound from Fort Monroe, Virginia, for Beaufort, South Carolina, Confederate States of America, with a cargo of United States Army coal, the schooner was wrecked on shoals off the coast of North Carolina 10 to 11 miles (16 to 18 km) southeast of Cape Lookout. The armed sidewheel paddle steamer USS Rhode Island (United States Navy) rescued her six crew members on 2 March.

== 28 February ==
List of shipwrecks: 28 February 1865
Ship	State	Description
Alby	Prussia	The brig ran aground on the Vogelsand, in the North Sea. She was on a voyage from Trieste to Hamburg. She was refloated with the assistance of a tug and taken in to Cuxhaven.
USS Arina	United States Navy	American Civil War: The vessel was destroyed by fire on the Mississippi River below New Orleans, Louisiana.
Belle Poule	United Kingdom	The ship ran aground at Liverpool, Lancashire.
Constantine	Russia	The schooner was driven ashore and wrecked on Anholt, Denmark. Her crew were rescued. She was on a voyage from Sunderland, County Durham, United Kingdom to Sønderborg, Denmark.
Crispin	(United Kingdom of Great Britain and Ireland) Jersey	The brigantine struck rocks off Brechou, Channel Islands and foundered with the loss of all hands. She was on a voyage from Newcastle upon Tyne, Northumberland to Alderney, Channel Islands.
Pioneer	United Kingdom	The steamship struck the Runnel Stone and foundered. Her crew were rescued. She was on a voyage from Bristol, Gloucestershire to London.
Queen of the Fleet	United States	The ship ran aground at Bremen. She was on a voyage from Baltimore, Maryland to Bremen. She was refloated with the assistance of a steamship.
Sophie	Denmark	The schooner was abandoned near "Yaerbylyng". She was on a voyage from an English port to Odense.
Sort	United Kingdom	American Civil War, Union blockade: The 33-ton schooner, a blockade runner carrying liquor and other assorted cargo, was forced aground off the coast of Florida on St. Martin's Reef near the mouth of the Crystal River by armed boats from the gunboat USS Honeysuckle (United States Navy). Eventually destroyed.
Stewart Monteith	United Kingdom	The smack sank in the Belfast Lough. Her three crew were rescued by the steamship Magnetic (United Kingdom). She was on a voyage from Whitehead, County Antrim to Donaghadee, County Down.
Unnamed	United Kingdom	The schooner was driven ashore at Dartmouth, Devon.

== Unknown date ==
List of shipwrecks: Unknown date in February 1865
Ship	State	Description
Alcide	United Kingdom	The brig was wrecked on the Sunk Sand, in the North Sea off the coast of Essex. Her crew were rescued by Queen (United Kingdom).
Ariel	Ottoman Empire	The ship was driven ashore and wrecked near Faros, Greece. She was on a voyage from Naples, Italy to Gallipoli.
Bessie, or Jessie	United Kingdom	The schooner collided with the Fleetwood Lightship ( Trinity House) and was abandoned. Her crew got on board the lightship. She subsequently ran aground on Taylor's Bank.
Caledonia	United Kingdom	The ship ran aground at Rutland Island, County Donegal. She was on a voyage from Ballina, County Mayo to Liverpool, Lancashire.
Charles	United Kingdom	The ship was wrecked in Vanloos Bay, Ceylon. She was on a voyage from Calcutta, India to Galle, Ceylon.
Cherokee	United Kingdom	The brig was wrecked. She was on a voyage from Boston, Massachusetts, United States to Port Medway, Nova Scotia, British North America.
Commerce	United Kingdom	The brig foundered before 6 February. Her crew survived.
Courier	United Kingdom	The ship was driven ashore at Sligo.
Earl of Malmesbury	United Kingdom	The schooner foundered in the English Channel off the coast of Hampshire before 3 February.
Emily	United Kingdom	The ship was wrecked on Gotland, Sweden before 24 February. Her crew survived.
Eugenie	United Kingdom	The barque was wrecked on Tree Island, Paracel Islands before 7 February. Her crew were rescued. She was on a voyage from Singapore, Straits Settlements to Penang, Malaya.
Geerdina	Flag unknown	The ship was wrecked near Dingle, County Kerry.
Hannah	United Kingdom	The ship was driven ashore at Terra Nova.
Jane and Mary	United Kingdom	The ship ran aground at Fishguard, Pembrokeshire. She was on a voyage from Ardrossa, Ayrshire to Newport, Monmouthshire. She was refloated on 27 February.
Jeanne Dare	France	The ship sank off "Trichett".
John Parkins	United Kingdom	The barque was wrecked on the coast of British Honduras.
Joseph	United Kingdom	The ship was driven ashore in Dundrum Bay. She was on a voyage from Liverpool to Dundalk, County Louth.
Josephina	United Kingdom	The ship struck the Almeinia Rocks and was severely damaged. She put in to Cádiz, Spain.
Josephine	United Kingdom	The ship was driven ashore on Saltholm, Denmark. She was on a voyage from Danzig to Kingston upon Hull, Yorkshire.
Juno	United Kingdom	The schooner ran aground on the Eastern Black Stone and was abandoned by her crew. She was on a voyage from Poole, Dorset to Lisbon, Portugal. She floated off on 1 March and sank.
Larerrian	France	The ship was wrecked at Matamoros, Mexico before 18 February.
Lel Verar	France	The barque was wrecked between "Brazos" and Boca del Rio, British Honduras.
Marion	United Kingdom	The barque was driven ashore at Tara Point, County Down before 15 February.
Mowe	Flag unknown	The ship ran aground near Hellevoetsluis, Zeeland, Netherlands.
Nymph of the Seas	(United Kingdom of Great Britain and Ireland) New Zealand	The schooner was wrecked close to the location of the wreck of Thames ( (United Kingdom of Great Britain and Ireland) New Zealand) (see February 20).
Onwary	United Kingdom	The schooner was wrecked in West Quoddy Bay, Maine, United States before 20 February. She was on a voyage from Boston, Massachusetts, United States to Saint John, New Brunswick, British North America.
Prince	United Kingdom	The steamship was driven ashore east of Dunkirk, Nord, France.
Royal Middy	United Kingdom	The ship was driven ashore 40 nautical miles (74 km) from Cartagena, Spain.
Sarah and Maria	United Kingdom	The ship foundered in the Atlantic Ocean 60 nautical miles (110 km) off Lisbon, Portugal. She was reported to be on a voyage from Cardiff to Swansea, Glamorgan.
Stirlings-hill	United Kingdom	The ship was wrecked on the Blackwater Bank, in the Irish Sea.
Sveridge	United Kingdom	The schooner was attacked and plundered by the local inhabitants in the Congo River. Two of her crew were captured. She was subsequently taken to Fernando Po, Spanish Guinea in a severely leaky condition.
Teviotdale	United Kingdom	The ship was wrecked at Pernambuco, Brazil.
Vencedor	Portugal	The ship was beached at "Amew". She was on a voyage from Lisbon to Pernambuco.
Virginia	France	The ship was wrecked at Cape Tenez, Algeria.
Wild Wave	United Kingdom	The ship ran aground on the English Bank, in the River Plate. She was on a voyage from Swansea to Montevideo, Uruguay. She was refloated and taken in to Montevideo in a leaky condition.
CSS Wilmington	Confederate States Navy	American Civil War: The screw gunboat was burned to prevent her capture by Union forces when Wilmington, North Carolina, fell to the Union.
William Pitt	United Kingdom	The brig ran aground on the Gunfleet Sand. She was refloated and assisted in to Harwich, Essex in a leaky condition.
Yadkin	Confederate States of America	American Civil War: The incomplete ironclad gunboat either was destroyed on the building ways to prevent her capture by Union forces when Wilmington, North Carolina, fell to the Union, or was scuttled as a blockship in North Carolina′s Cape Fear River near Fort Campbell (sources disagree).
1, 2, 3, 4, 5, 7, and 8	Confederate States Navy	American Civil War: The David-type torpedo boats, were scuttled in Charleston Harbor off Charleston, South Carolina – at least three of them in the Cooper River – to prevent their capture by Union forces. Union forces later salvaged and repaired the three scuttled in the Cooper River.
