= USS Atlanta (1861) =

British and American casemate ironclad gunboat

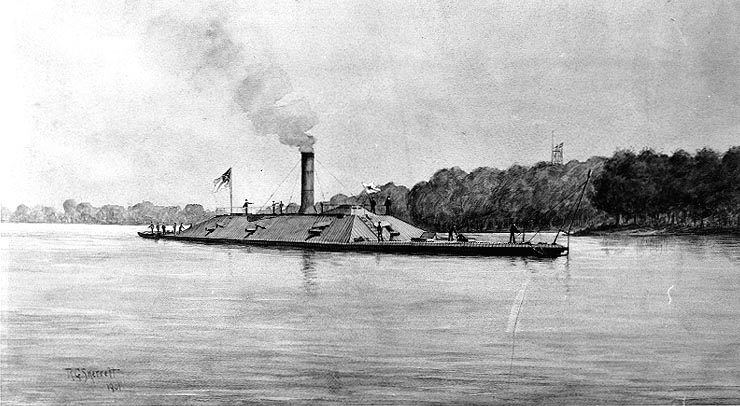
- A sepia wash drawing of CSS Atlanta by R.G. Skerrett

History

United Kingdom
- Name: Fingal
- Namesake: Fingal
- Owner: Hutcheson's West Highland Service
- Builder: J & G Thomson
- Launched: 9 May 1861
- Fate: Sold to the Confederacy, 1861

General characteristics
- Tons burthen: About 700 tons (bm)
- Length: 189 ft (57.6 m)
- Beam: 25 ft (7.6 m)
- Draft: 12 ft (3.7 m)
- Depth of hold: 15 ft (4.6 m)
- Installed power: 1 Tubular boiler
- Propulsion: 1 Shaft; 2 Direct-acting steam engines
- Speed: 13 knots (24 km/h; 15 mph)

Confederate States

United States
- Name: CSS/USS Atlanta
- Namesake: Atlanta
- Builder: Asa and Nelson Tift
- Acquired: September 1861
- Commissioned: 22 November 1862
- Decommissioned: 21 June 1865
- Captured: 17 June 1863, transferred to United States Navy in February 1864
- Fate: Sold to Haiti, 4 May 1869. Lost at sea, December 1869

General characteristics
- Type: Casemate ironclad
- Displacement: 1,006 long tons (1,022 t)
- Length: 204 ft (62.2 m)
- Beam: 41 ft (12.5 m)
- Draft: 15 ft 9 in (4.8 m)
- Depth of hold: 17 ft (5.2 m)
- Speed: 7–10 knots (13–19 km/h; 8.1–11.5 mph)
- Complement: 145 officers and men
- Armament: 2 × 7-inch (178 mm) Brooke rifles; 2 × 6.4-inch (163 mm) Brooke rifles; 1 x Spar torpedo; Naval ram
- Armor: Casemate: 4 in (102 mm); Hull: 2 in (51 mm); Pilothouse: 4 in (102 mm)

Atlanta was a casemate ironclad that served in the Confederate and Union Navies during the American Civil War. She was converted from a British-built blockade runner named Fingal by the Confederacy after she made one run to Savannah, Georgia. After several failed attempts to attack Union blockaders, the ship was captured by two Union monitors in 1863 when she ran aground. Atlanta was floated off, repaired, and rearmed, serving in the Union Navy for the rest of the war. She spent most of her time deployed on the James River supporting Union forces there. The ship was decommissioned in 1865 and placed in reserve. Several years after the end of the war, Atlanta was sold to Haiti, but was lost at sea in December 1869 on her delivery voyage.

== Description and career as Fingal ==
Fingal was designed and built as a merchantman by J&G Thomson's Clyde Bank Iron Shipyard at Govan in Glasgow, Scotland, and was completed early in 1861. She was described by Midshipman Dabney Scales, who served on the Atlanta before her battle with the monitors, as being a two-masted, iron-hulled ship 189 feet (57.6 m) long with a beam of 25 feet (7.6 m). She had a draft of 12 feet (3.7 m) and a depth of hold of 15 feet (4.6 m). He estimated her tonnage at around 700 tons bm. Fingal was equipped with two vertical single-cylinder direct-acting steam engines using steam generated by one flue-tubular boiler. The engines drove the ship at a top speed of around 13 knots (24 km/h; 15 mph). They had a bore of 39 inches (991 mm) and a stroke of 30 inches (762 mm).

The ship briefly operated between Glasgow and other ports in Scotland for Hutcheson's West Highland Service before she was purchased in September 1861 by James D. Bulloch, the primary foreign agent in Great Britain for the Confederacy, and Major Edward Clifford Anderson Confederate Secretary of War in England, to deliver the military and naval ordnance and supplies that they purchased. To disguise his control of Fingal, and the destination of her cargo, Bulloch hired an English crew and captain and put out his destination as Bermuda and Nassau in the Bahamas. The cargo was loaded in Greenock in early October, although Bulloch and the other passengers would not attempt to board until they rendezvoused with the ship at Holyhead, Wales. On the night 14/15 October, as she was slowly rounding the breakwater at Holyhead, Fingal rammed and sank the Austrian brig Siccardi, slowly swinging at anchor without lights. Bulloch and the passengers embarked in the steamer while Bulloch dispatched a letter to his financial agents instructing them to settle damages with the brig's owners because he could not afford to take the time to deal with the affair lest he and Fingal be detained. The ship reached Bermuda on 2 November and, after leaving port on 7 November, Bulloch informed the crew that the steamer's real destination was Savannah, Georgia; he offered to take anyone who objected to the plan to Nassau. However, all of the crew agreed to join in the effort to run the Union blockade. Fingal was able to slip safely into the Savannah estuary in a heavy fog on the night of 12 November without sighting any blockaders.

While Fingal was discharging her cargo, Bulloch and Anderson went to Richmond to confer with Stephen Mallory, Secretary of the Navy. Mallory endorsed Bulloch's plan to load Fingal with cotton to sell on the Navy Department's account to be used to purchase more ships and equipment in Europe. He returned to Savannah on 23 November and it took him almost a month to purchase a cargo and acquire enough coal. He made one attempt to break through the blockade on 23 December, but it proved impossible to do as the Union controlled every channel from Savannah, aided by their occupation of Tybee Island at the mouth of the Savannah River. Bulloch reported to Mallory in late January 1862 that breaking out was hopeless so Mallory ordered him to turn the ship over to another officer and to return to Europe some other way.

== As Atlanta ==
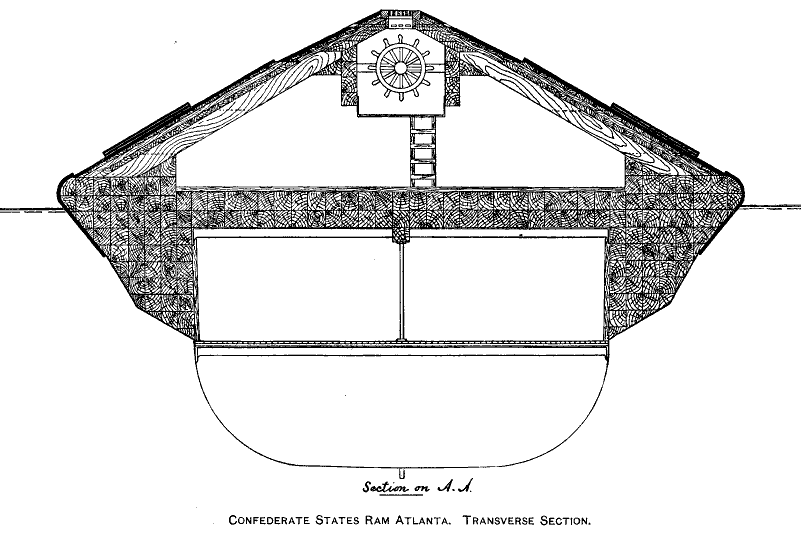
Cross-section of Atlanta

Confederate navy flag of the CSS Atlanta

The brothers Asa and Nelson Tift received the contract to convert the blockade runner into an ironclad in early 1862 with the name of Atlanta, after the city in Georgia. This was largely financed by contributions from the women of Savannah. Fingal was cut down to her main deck and large wooden sponsons were built out from the sides of her hull to support her casemate. After the conversion, Atlanta was 204 feet (62.2 m) long overall and had a beam of 41 feet (12 m). Her depth of hold was now 17 feet (5.2 m) and she now had a draft of 15 feet 9 inches (4.8 m). Atlanta now displaced 1,006 long tons (1,022 t) and her speed was estimated at 7–10 knots (13–19 km/h; 8.1–11.5 mph).

The armor of the casemate was angled at 30° from the horizontal and made from two layers of railroad rails, rolled into plates 2 inches (51 mm) thick and 7 inches (180 mm) wide. The outer layer ran vertically and the inner layer horizontally. Her armor was backed by 3 inches (76 mm) of oak, vertically oriented, and two layers of 7.5 inches (191 mm) of pine, alternating in direction. The bottom of the casemate was some 20 inches (508 mm) from the waterline and its top was 8 feet 6 inches (2.59 m) above the waterline. The pyramidal pilothouse was armored in the same way and had room for two men. The upper portion of Atlanta's hull received 2 inches (51 mm) of armor.

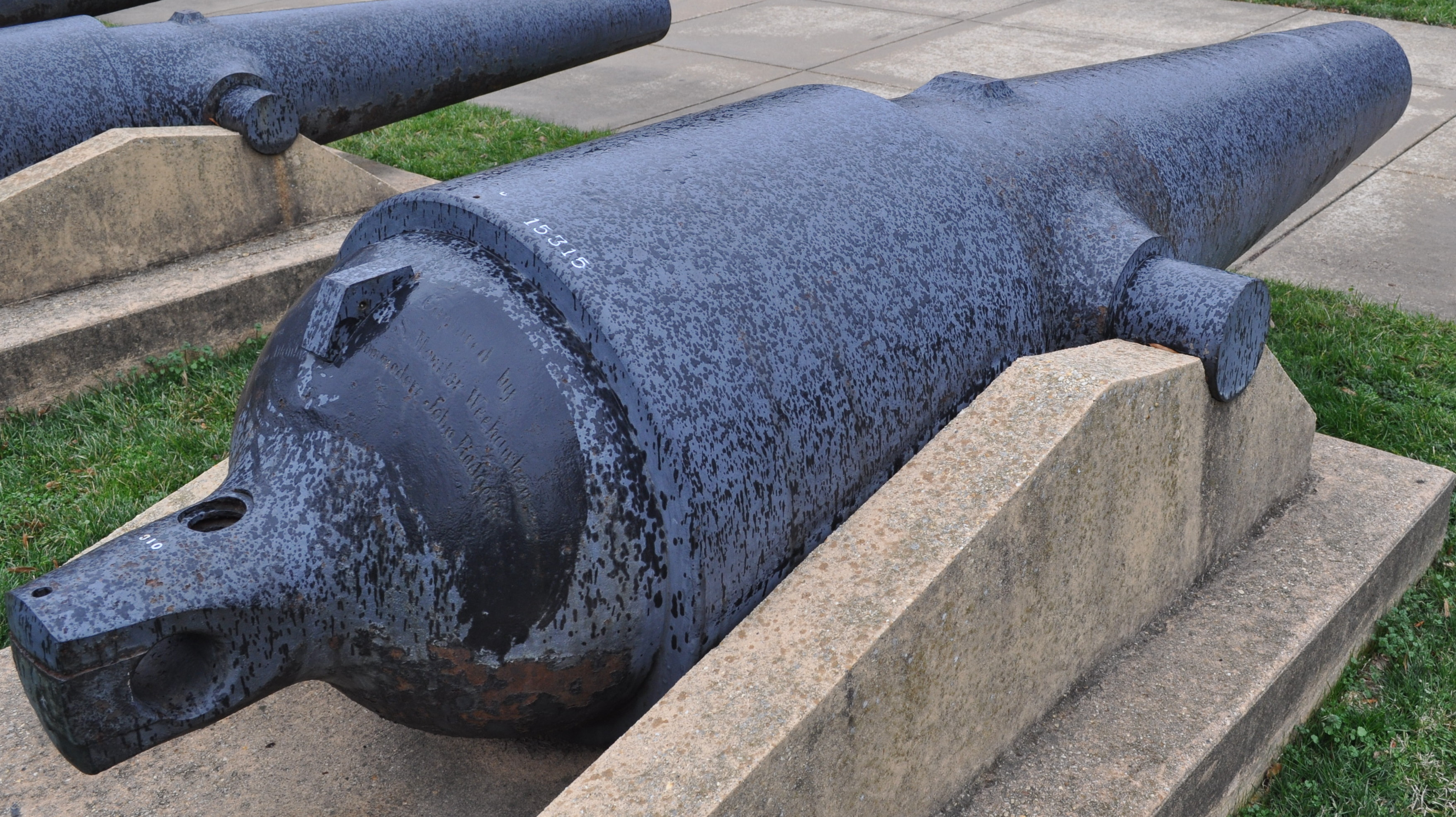
One of Atlanta's 7-inch Brooke rifles in the Washington Navy Yard

The rectangular casemate was pierced with eight narrow gun ports, one each at the bow and stern and three along each side. Each gun port was protected by an armored shutter made of two layers of iron riveted together and allowed the guns to elevate only to a maximum of +5 to +7°. Atlanta was armed with single-banded, 7-inch (178 mm) Brooke rifles on pivot mounts at the bow and stern. The middle gun port on each side was occupied by a single-banded, 6.4-inch (163 mm) Brooke rifle. The 17-caliber, seven-inch guns weighed about 15,000 pounds (6,800 kg) and fired 80-pound (36 kg) armor-piercing "bolts" and 110-pound (50 kg) explosive shells. The equivalent statistics for the 18.5-caliber, 6.4-inch gun were 9,110 pounds (4,130 kg) with 80-pound bolts and 64-pound (29 kg) shells. Atlanta was also armed with a 20-foot (6.1 m), solid iron, ram that was reinforced by a series of vertical steel bars. In front of the ram was a spar torpedo that carried 50 pounds (23 kg) of black powder on a wooden pole connected to an iron lever that could be raised or lowered by means of pulleys.

Commander William A Webb of the Atlanta

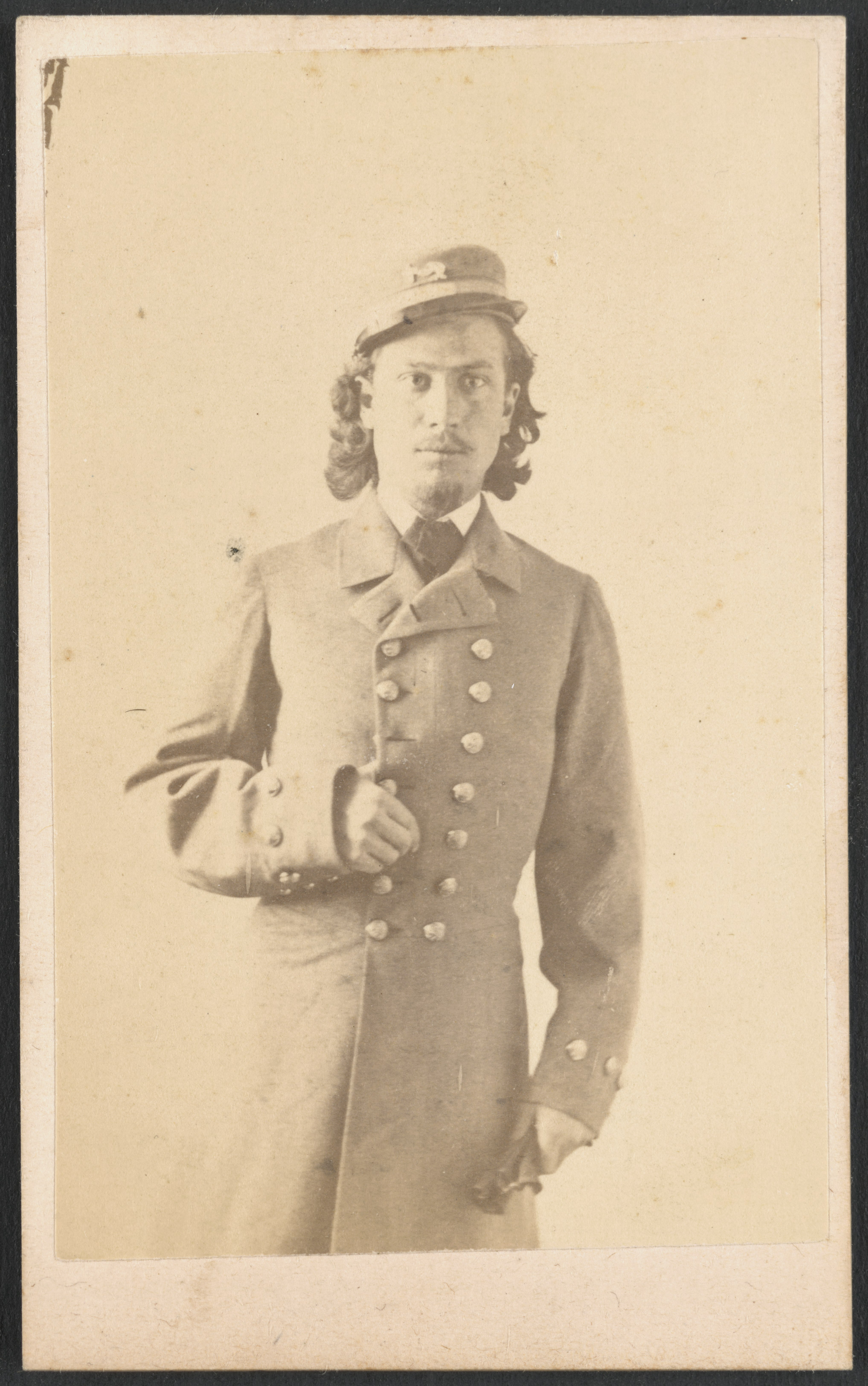
Midshipman and Acting Master's Mate Frank Beville of the Atlanta in uniform

On 31 July 1862, under the command of Lieutenant Charles H. McBlair, Atlanta conducted her sea trials down the Savannah River toward Fort Pulaski. The ship proved to be difficult to steer, and the additional weight of her armor and guns significantly reduced her speed and increased her draft. This latter was a real problem in the shallow waters near Savannah. She also leaked significantly, and her design virtually eliminated air circulation. One report said that "it was almost intolerable on board the Atlanta, there being no method of ventilation, and the heat was intense." Scales commented in his diary, "What a comfortless, infernal and God-forsaken ship!!"

Attempts were made to fix the problems and were at least partially successful in stopping many of the leaks. The ship was commissioned on 22 November and became the flagship of Flag Officer Josiah Tattnall III, commander of the naval defenses of Georgia. Under pressure from Mallory to engage the blockading ships, Tattnall attempted to engage them before any ironclads arrived on 5 January 1863, but army engineers could not clear the obstacles blocking the channel in a timely manner, despite early coordination being made by Tattnall to do so. It took another month to actually clear the obstacles and two monitors arrived before the end of January. Nonetheless, Tattnall attempted to pass through the obstructions during high tide on 3 February, but high winds prevented the water from rising enough to allow the ship to do so. After Atlanta successfully passed through them on 19 March, Tattnall planned to attack the Union base at Port Royal, South Carolina while the monitors were attacking Charleston. Deserters revealed Tatnall's plan while he was waiting at the head of Wassaw Sound and he was forced to retreat when three monitors augmented the defenses at Port Royal. Dissatisfied with Tattnall's perceived lack of aggressiveness, Mallory replaced Tattnall as commander of the Savannah squadron later that month with Commander Richard L. Page. Page, in his turn was relieved in May by Commander William A. Webb; Atlanta remained the squadron flagship throughout this time.

Webb demonstrated his aggressiveness when he attempted to sortie on the first spring tide (30 May) after taking command, but Atlanta's forward engine broke down after he had passed the obstructions, and the ship ran aground. She was not damaged although it took over a day to pull her free. He planned to make another attempt on the next full tide, rejecting Mallory's idea that he wait until the nearly complete ironclad Savannah was finished before his next sortie. In the meantime, Rear Admiral Samuel F. Du Pont, commander of the South Atlantic Blockading Squadron, had ordered the monitors Weehawken and Nahant into Wassaw Sound. Commander John Rodgers in Weehawken had overall command of the two ships.

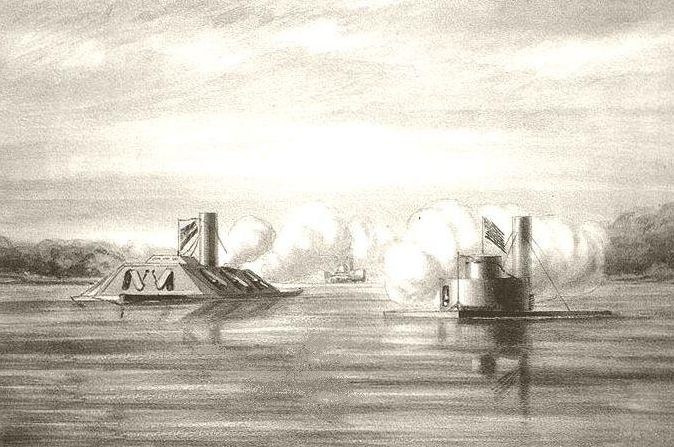
A drawing of USS Weehawken capturing Atlanta, 17 June 1863

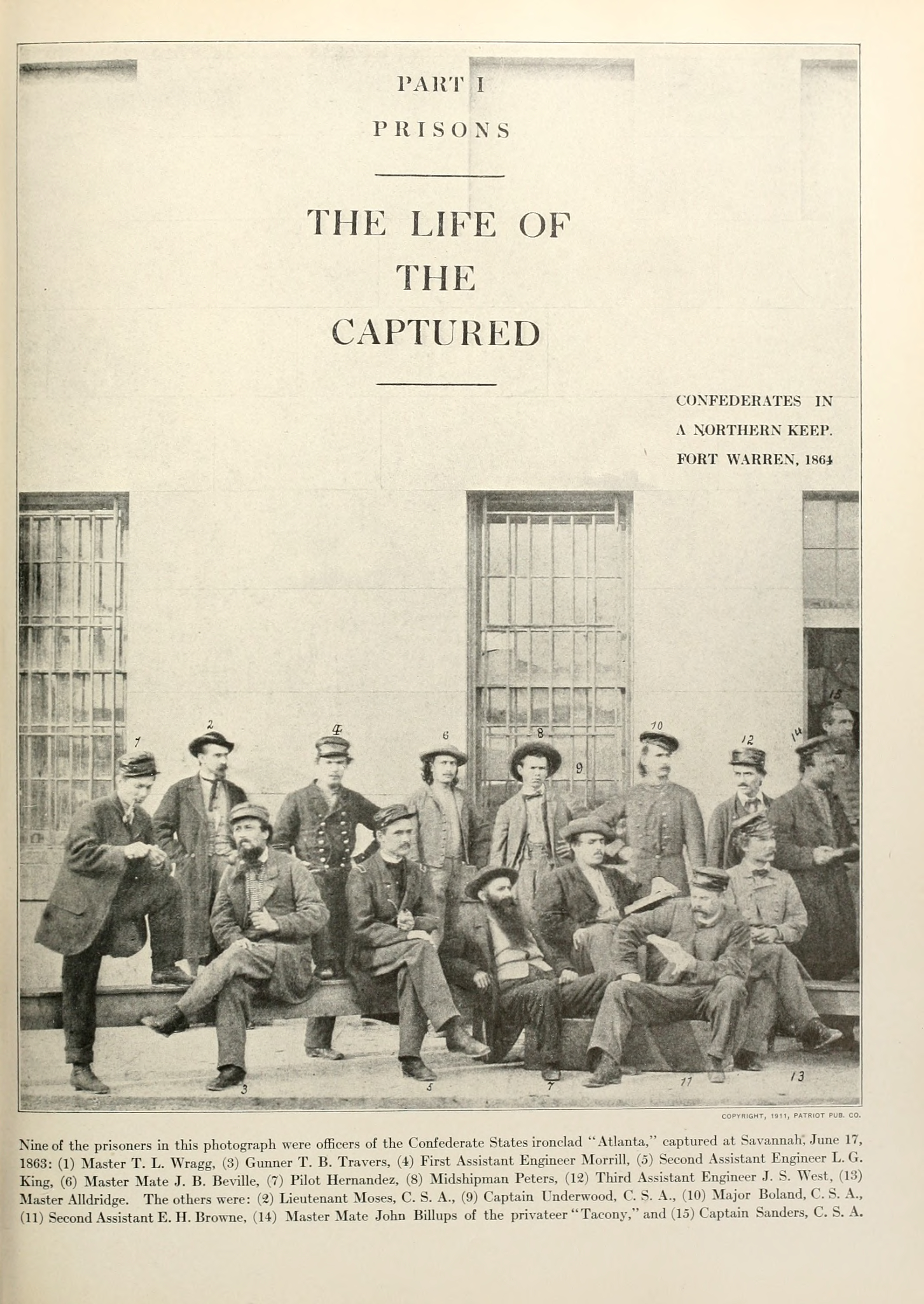
9 crewmen of the CSS Atlanta after their capture

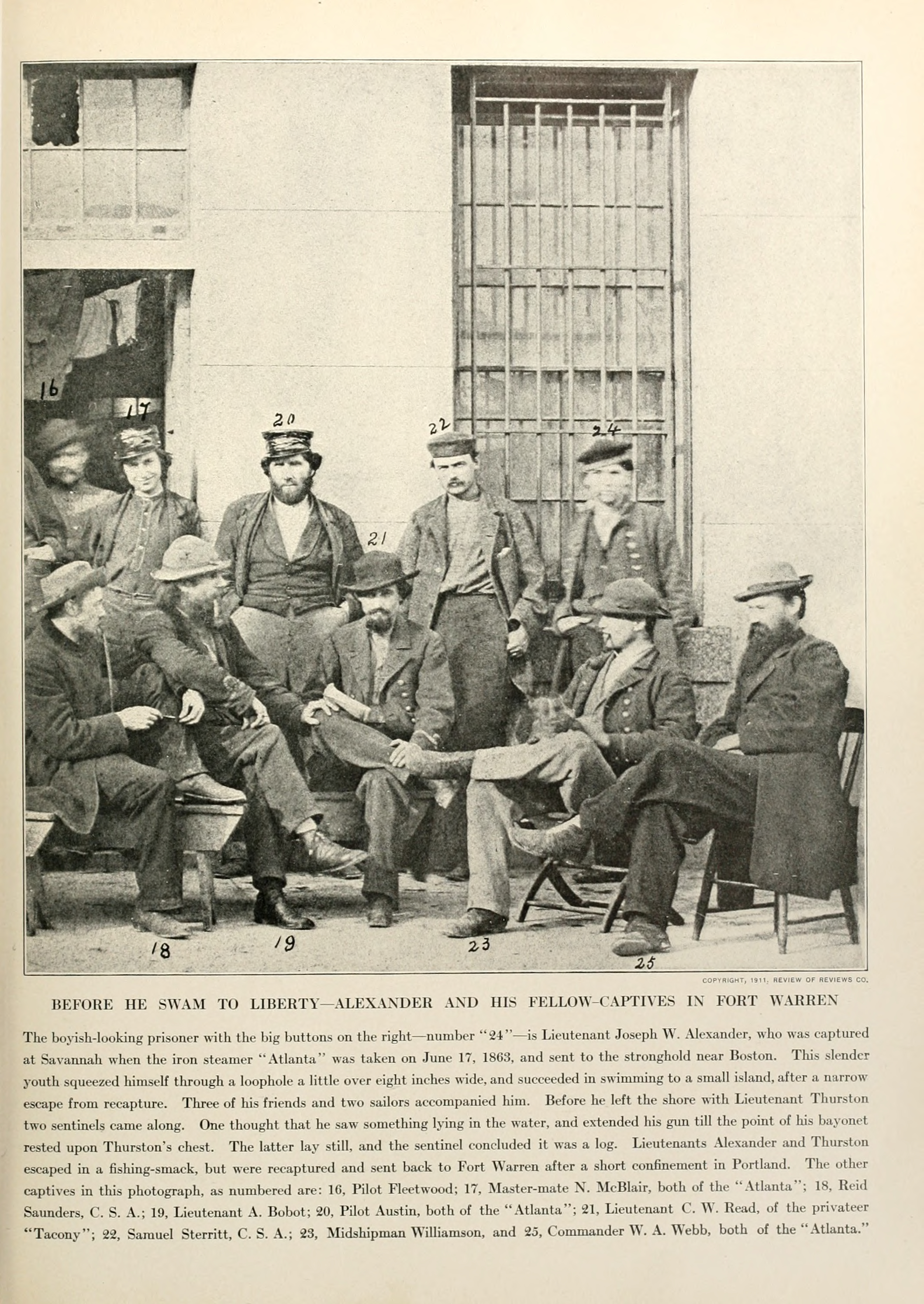
6 crewmen of the CSS Atlanta after their capture

In the early evening of 15 June, Webb began his next attempt by passing over the lower obstructions in the Wilmington River and spent the rest of the night coaling. He moved forward the next evening to a concealed position within easy reach of the monitors for an attack early the following morning. Webb planned to sink one of the monitors with his spar torpedo and then deal with the other one with his guns. The gunboat Isondiga and the tugboat Resolute were to accompany him to tow one or both of the monitors back to Savannah.

A lookout aboard Weehawken spotted Atlanta at 04:10 on the morning of 17 June. When the latter ship closed to within about 1.5 miles (2.4 km) of the two Union ships, she fired one round from her bow gun that passed over Weehawken and landed near Nahant. Shortly afterward, Atlanta ran aground on a sandbar; she was briefly able to free herself, but the pressure of the tide pushed her back onto the sandbar. This time Webb was unable to get off and the monitors closed the range. When Weehawken, the leading ship, closed to within 200–300 yards (180–270 m) she opened fire with both of her guns. The 11-inch (279 mm) shell missed, but the 15-inch (381 mm) shell struck the ironclad above the port middle gun port, penetrated her armor and broke the wooden backing behind it, spraying splinters and fragments that disabled the entire gun crew and half the crew of the bow gun, even though it failed to cleanly penetrate through the backing. The next shot from the 11-inch Dahlgren gun struck the upper hull and started a small leak even though it failed to penetrate the two-inch armor there. The next shell from the 15-inch Dahlgren glanced off the middle starboard gun shutter as it was being opened, wounding half the gun's crew with fragments. The final shell was also from the 15-inch Dahlgren and it struck the top of the pilothouse, breaking the armor there and wounding both pilots in it. By this time, Atlanta had been able to fire only seven shots, none of which hit either Union ship, and was hard aground with high tide not due for another hour and a half. Weehawken and Nahant were able to freely maneuver into positions from which the Atlanta's narrow gun ports would not allow her to reply and the damage already inflicted by the former ship made further resistance futile. Webb surrendered his ship within 15 minutes of opening fire, before Nahant even had a chance to fire. Of the ironclad's 21 officers and 124 enlisted men, one man was killed and another sixteen were wounded badly enough to require hospitalization.

== In the Union Navy ==
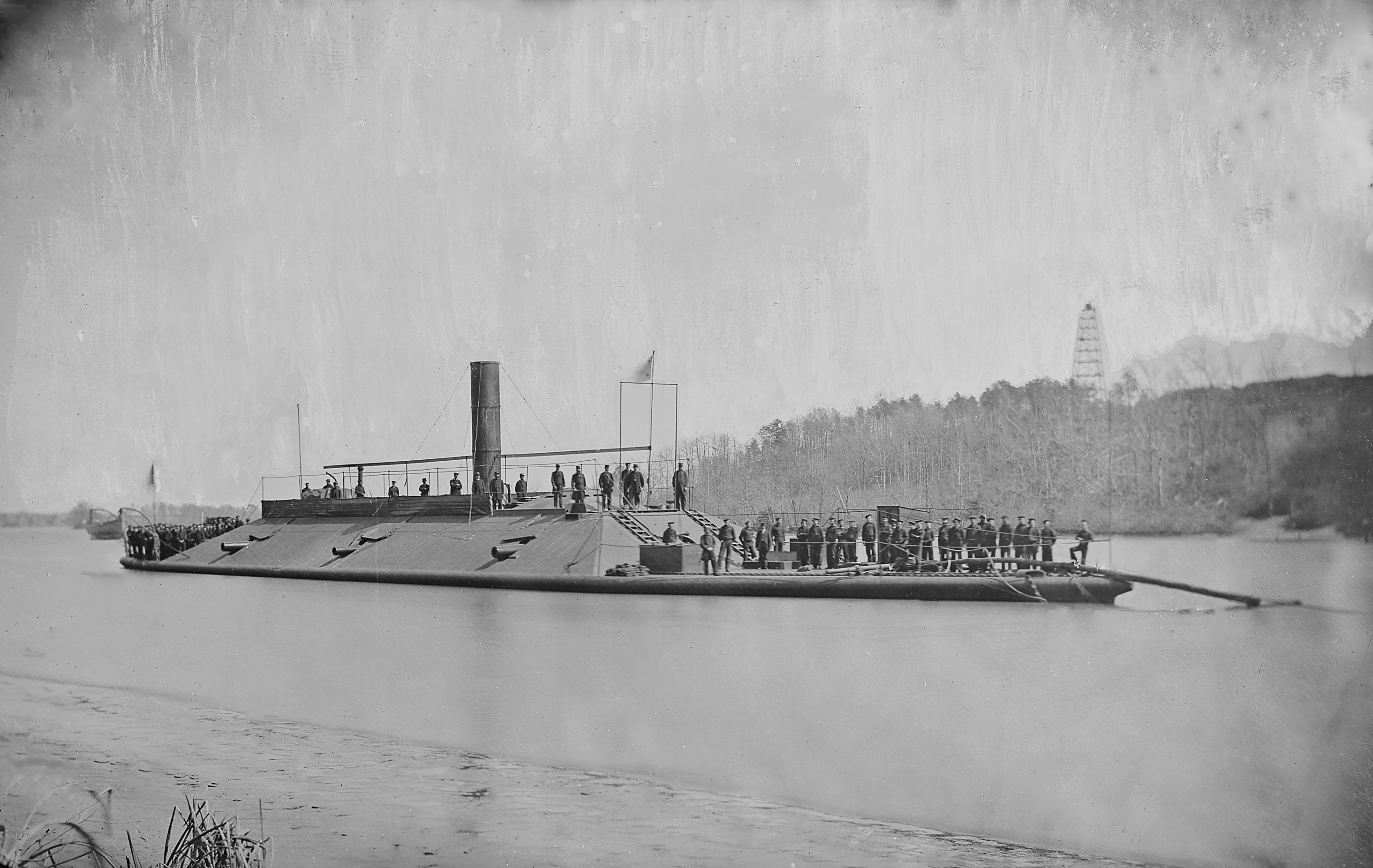
USS Atlanta on the James River; photo probably by Mathew Brady

Atlanta was easily pulled free by the Union ships and she reached Port Royal under her own power. Not badly damaged, she was repaired and bought by the Union Navy. The prize money of $350,000 was shared between the crews of Weehawken, Nahant and the gunboat Cimarron, the only ships within signaling distance. The ship retained her name and was commissioned again on 2 February 1864, rearmed with a pair of 8-inch (203 mm), 150-pound Parrott rifles in the bow and stern and 6.4-inch, 100-pound Parrott rifles amidships. The 150-pound Parrott rifle weighed 16,500 pounds (7,500 kg) and was 17 calibers long. The 100-pounder weighed 9,800 pounds (4,400 kg) and was 20 calibers long. It fired a 100-pound (45 kg) shell a distance of 6,900 yards (6,300 m) at an elevation of +25°. All four of her Brooke rifles are currently located in Willard Park in the Washington Navy Yard. Atlanta was assigned to the North Atlantic Blockading Squadron and spent most of her time stationed up the James River where she could support operations against Richmond and defend against a sortie by the ironclads of the James River Squadron. On 21 May 1864, she and the gunboat Dawn fired on and dispersed Confederate cavalry that was attacking Fort Powhatan and she was deployed further upriver in February 1865 after the Battle of Trent's Reach to better blockade the Confederate ironclads at Richmond.

After the end of the war in April, Atlanta was decommissioned in Philadelphia on 21 June 1865 and placed in reserve at League Island. She was sold to Sam Ward on 4 May 1869 for the price of $25,000 and subsequently delivered to representatives of Haiti on 8 December by Sydney Oaksmith, a lawyer who had received an advance of $50,000 on her purchase price of $260,000. The ship was briefly seized by the Customs Service, possibly for violations of neutrality laws as she had just loaded four large guns and a number of recruits for the forces of Sylvain Salnave, President of Haiti, who was embroiled in a civil war. Atlanta was released and sailed for Port-au-Prince three days later. She broke down in Delaware Bay and had to put in at Chester, Pennsylvania for repairs. The ship, now renamed either Triumph or Triumfo, departed on 18 December 1869 and vanished en route, apparently sinking with the loss of all hands, either off Cape Hatteras or the Delaware Capes.

== See also ==
- Blockade runners of the American Civil War
- Bibliography of American Civil War naval history

== Bibliography ==
- Anderson, Edward Clifford, Afloat and Ashore: The Confederate Diary of Colonel Edward Clifford Anderson, University of Alabama Press, 1977
- Bisbee, Saxon T. (2018). Engines of Rebellion: Confederate Ironclads and Steam Engineering in the American Civil War. Tuscaloosa, Alabama: University of Alabama Press. ISBN 978-0-81731-986-1.
- Bulloch, Jame D. (1884). The Secret Service of the Confederate States in Europe: or, How the Confederate Cruisers were Equipped. Vol. I. New York: G.P. Putnam.
- Canney, Donald L. (2015). The Confederate Steam Navy 1861-1865. Atglen, Pennsylvania: Schiffer Publishing. ISBN 978-0-7643-4824-2.
- Emerson, William C. (1995). "Unfounded Hopes: A Design Analysis of the Confederate Steamer CSS Atlanta". Warship International. XXXII (4): 367–387. ISSN 0043-0374.
- Holcombe, Robert; Silverstone, Paul H. (1991). "Question 35/90". Warship International. XXVIII (4). Toledo, OH: International Naval Research Organization: 404. ISSN 0043-0374.
- Olmstead, Edwin; Stark, Wayne E.; Tucker, Spencer C. (1997). The Big Guns: Civil War Siege, Seacoast, and Naval Cannon. Alexandria Bay, New York: Museum Restoration Service. ISBN 0-88855-012-X.
- Scharf, J. Thomas (1887). History of the Confederate States Navy. New York: Rogers & Sherwood.
- Scheina, Robert L. (1987). Latin America, A Naval History: 1810–1987. Annapolis, Maryland: Naval Institute Press. ISBN 0-87021-295-8.
- Silverstone, Paul H. (1989). Warships of the Civil War Navies. Annapolis, Maryland: Naval Institute Press. ISBN 0-87021-783-6.
- Silverstone, Paul H. (1984). Directory of the World's Capital Ships. New York: Hippocrene Books. ISBN 0-88254-979-0.
- Still, William N. Jr. (1985) [1971]. Iron Afloat: The Story of the Confederate Armorclads. Columbia, South Carolina: University of South Carolina Press. ISBN 0-87249-454-3.
- Wise, Stephen R. (1991). Lifeline of the Confederacy: Blockade Running During the Civil War. Columbia, South Carolina: University of South Carolina Press. ISBN 9780872497993.
