= USS Nahant (1862) =

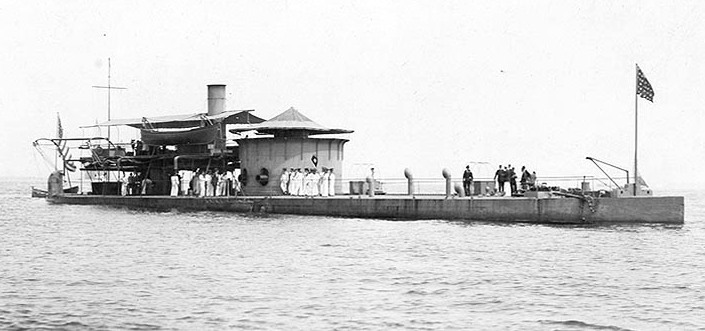
- USS Nahant

History

United States
- Name: USS Nahant
- Builder: Harrison Loring
- Launched: October 7, 1862
- Commissioned: December 29, 1862
- Decommissioned: 1898
- Renamed: USS Atlas, June 15, 1869; USS Nahant, August 10, 1869
- Fate: Sold, April 6, 1904

General characteristics
- Class & type: Passaic-class ironclad monitor
- Displacement: 1,875 long tons (1,905 t)
- Length: 200 ft (61 m) o/a
- Beam: 46 ft (14 m)
- Draft: 10 ft 6 in (3.20 m)
- Installed power: 320 ihp (240 kW)
- Propulsion: 1 × Ericsson vibrating lever engine; 2 × Martin boilers; 1 × shaft
- Speed: 5 kn (5.8 mph; 9.3 km/h)
- Complement: 75 officers and men
- Armament: 1 × 15 in (380 mm) smoothbore, 1 × 11 in (280 mm) Dahlgren gun
- Armor: Side: 3–5 in (7.6–12.7 cm); Turret: 11 in (28 cm); Deck: 1 in (2.5 cm)
- Notes: Armor is iron.

The first USS Nahant was a Passaic-class ironclad monitor of the United States Navy that saw service in the American Civil War and the Spanish–American War.

Nahant was launched on October 7, 1862, by Harrison Loring, South Boston, Massachusetts, and commissioned on December 29, 1862, Commander John Downes in command.

== Service history ==
=== Fort McAllister ===
The new single-turreted monitor joined the South Atlantic Blockading Squadron at Port Royal Harbor, South Carolina on February 20, 1863, and saw her first action in the Union bombardment of Fort McAllister on March 3.

=== Charleston ===
A little over a month later, she participated in Rear Admiral Samuel Francis du Pont's valiant but ill-fated attack on Charleston Harbor. The ironclads crossed Stono Bar and entered Charleston Harbor on 6 April, but a heavy fog stopped their advance lest they run aground attempting to negotiate the tricky channels leading to the vital Confederate port. Though dawn broke clear the next morning, an ebb tide kept the warships from getting underway until noon. Shortly after 15:00, Weehawken's guns opened on Fort Sumter, and through the afternoon Du Pont's ships stubbornly hammered at Confederate batteries while withstanding the intense and accurate converging fire of the Southern cannon.

With darkness approaching and his ironclads severely battered, Du Pont broke off the action, determined to return to the fray at daybreak. That night, however, reports from his captains of the serious damage suffered by their ships convinced him that the small chance of success of another attack did not justify the great risk to his squadron.

In the fighting, Nahant had been hit 36 times, disabling her turret and breaking off a large piece of iron inside her pilot house, killing her helmsman and wounding her pilot and two others. The whole fleet took 13 casualties. The next day, with her sister monitors, she retired to Port Royal for repairs.

=== CSS Atlanta engagement ===
On 10 June, after intelligence reports indicated that the ram CSS Atlanta was preparing to attack wooden blockader Cimarron, Du Pont ordered Weehawken, Captain John Rodgers, and Nahant to Wassaw Sound, Georgia to await the powerful ironclad ram. Shortly before dawn, a week later, Atlanta, accompanied by stern wheel gunboat CSS Isondiga and ram CSS Resolute, steamed down the Wilmington River and entered Wassaw Sound to attack the monitors. The Confederate flagship carried a torpedo projecting from her bow, hoping to explode it against one of the monitors before dispatching the other with her guns.

Seeing the Southern ships approach, Weehawken and Nahant headed in to accept the challenge. As the adversaries closed to fighting range, Atlanta was first to fire, but soon ran aground, where she could not aim her guns effectively. The monitors held their fire until within 200 yd (180 m). Weehawken then quickly put five rounds from her heavy guns into the ram. With two of his guns out of action, two of his three pilots severely wounded, and his ship hard aground, Cdr. William A. Webb, CSN, was compelled to surrender Atlanta while her escorts scurried to safety. Atlanta was subsequently purchased from a prize court by the Federal Government and commissioned in the Union Navy.

=== Blockade duty ===
Early in July, after he had taken command of the South Atlantic Blockading Squadron, Rear Adm. John A. Dahlgren ordered the monitors back to Charleston harbor. Nahant, now under the command of William Kennon Mayo, and her sisters bombarded Confederate works on Morris Island on July 10, supporting and covering the landing of Army troops. For almost two months, the shelling continued until the steadfast defenders were finally compelled to abandon Battery Wagner, their last position on the island, on September 6.

In ensuing months, Nahant continued operations in the vicinity of Charleston, patrolling, enforcing the blockade, and bombarding Confederate positions ashore. On November 15, she joined Lehigh in supporting the Union Army at Cumming's Point on Morris Island during a heavy evening bombardment from Fort Moultrie. The next day, despite heavy shelling from shore batteries, she helped refloat Lehigh after her sister monitor had run aground.

On February 2, 1865, Nahant joined Lehigh and Passaic in shelling the Confederate blockade runner Presto after the blockade runner had run ashore under the batteries of Fort Moultrie. After three days of shelling, the hulk was completely destroyed.

=== Spanish–American War ===
Men and ship mascots aboard Nahant

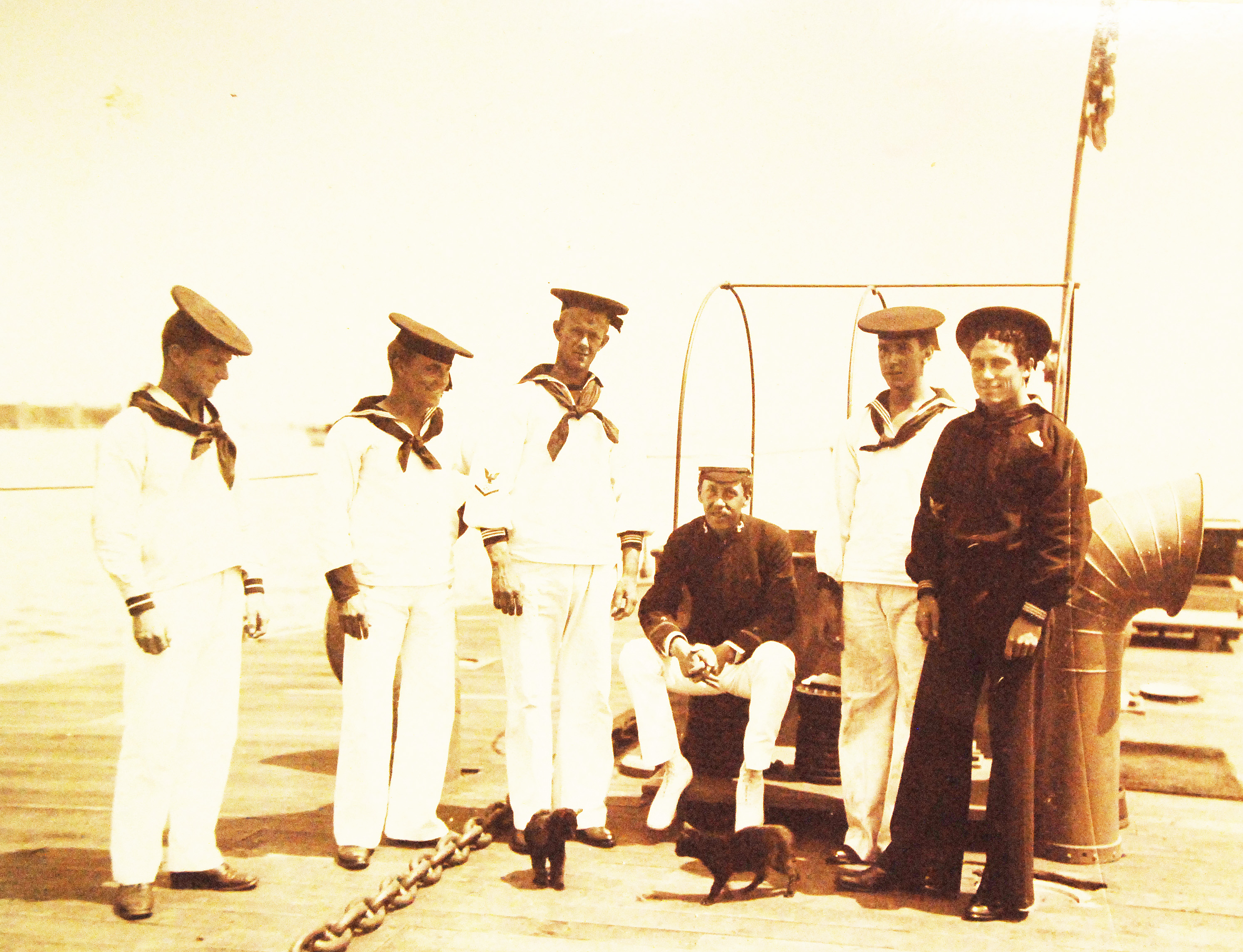
Men and ship mascots aboard Nahant

Nahant decommissioned at Philadelphia, Pennsylvania on August 11, 1865. While laid up, she was renamed Atlas on June 15, 1869, but resumed the name Nahant on August 10. The veteran monitor recommissioned at League Island on April 12, 1898, and steamed to New York City for harbor defense during the Spanish–American War. Nahant decommissioned at League Island and was laid up there until sold on April 6, 1904, to L. E. Hunt of Melrose, Massachusetts.

== In literature ==
Life aboard Nahant during the Civil War was documented in a book titled "A Year on a Monitor and the Destruction of Fort Sumter" by Alvah F Hunter. In 1862 Hunter enlisted in the Union Navy, with difficulty as he was only 16. He served for a year on Nahant as a cabin boy, keeping a careful diary. Later in life he wrote the book, which stands as one of the few detailed accounts of wartime routine on a monitor.

== Bibliography ==
- Additional technical data from Gardiner, Robert (1979). Conway's All the World's Fighting Ships 1860–1905. Conway Maritime Press. p. 120. ISBN 0-85177-133-5.
- Wright, Christopher C. (June 2021). "Canonicus at Jamestown, 1907". Warship International. LVIII (2): 126–162. ISSN 0043-0374.
