= USS Savannah =

USS Savannah may refer to:

- USS Savannah (1798) was a 1-gun galley built in 1799
- USS Savannah (1842) was a sailing frigate launched in 1842
- USS Savannah (AS-8) was a submarine tender in service during World War I
- USS Savannah (CL-42) was a light cruiser in service during World War II
- USS Savannah (AOR-4) was a fleet replenishment oiler in service from 1970 to 1995
- USS Savannah (LCS-28) is an Independence-class littoral combat ship constructed in Mobile, Alabama, at Austal USA. First cut was made 19 July 2018.

== See also ==
- CSS Savannah
- SS Savannah
- NS Savannah
