= CSS Lady Davis =

Confederate gunboat from American Civil War

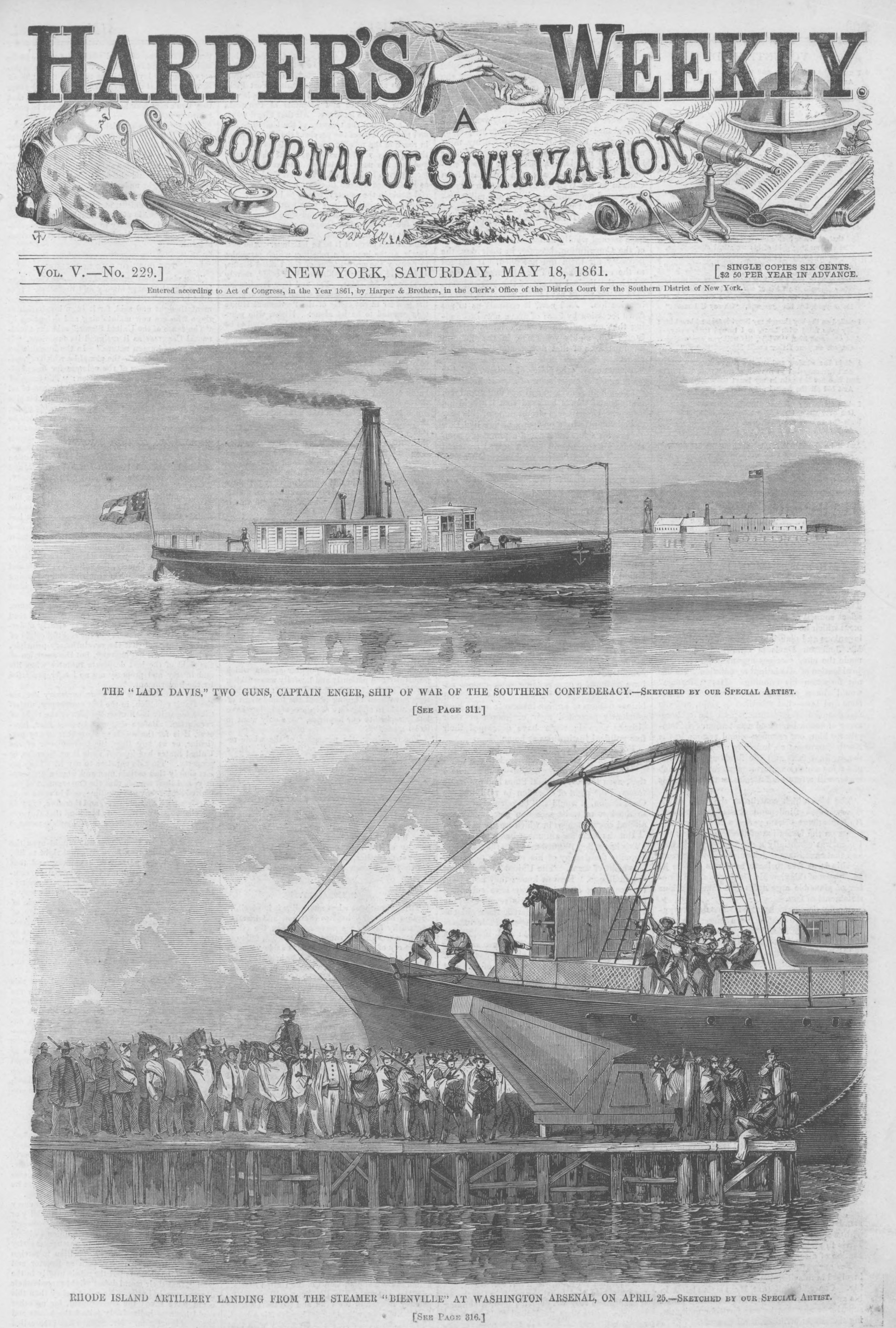
- Top picture CSS Lady Davis (Harper's Weekly May 18, 1861)

History

Confederate States
- Name: Lady Davis
- Launched: 1858
- Commissioned: March 1861
- Decommissioned: 1862
- Fate: served as private blockade runner 1862–1865; captured 1865

General characteristics
- Displacement: 250 tons
- Propulsion: steam engine
- Armament: 1 24-pounder cannon, 1 12-pounder rifled cannon

CSS Lady Davis was a gunboat in the Confederate States Navy during the American Civil War.

Originally the Richmond iron steam tug James Gray, built at Philadelphia, Pennsylvania in 1858, Lady Davis was purchased in March 1861 by Governor Francis Wilkinson Pickens of South Carolina, who armed her and placed in command Lieutenant William Gaillard Dozier, South Carolina Navy, with orders to thwart reinforcement of Fort Sumter by Union troops. On May 7, 1861 Lady Davis was purchased by the Confederacy for $32,000 and commissioned in the Confederate Navy, operating thereafter along the Georgia and South Carolina coasts. Lieutenant Thomas P. Pelot, CSN, took command about 5 days later, relieving Lieutenant Edward Cantey Stockton, South Carolina Navy. At that time, the little gunboat served as the flagship of Commodore Josiah Tattnall III's Savannah Defense Squadron, consisting of CSS Savannah, CSS Sampson and CSS Resolute.

On May 19, Lady Davis began her career with distinction by capturing and taking into Beaufort, South Carolina the A. B. Thompson, a full-rigged ship of 980 tons and a crew of 23 out of Brunswick, Maine, whom she encountered off Savannah while on an expedition seeking the U.S. armed brig Perry. The exploit culminated in acrimonious litigation to decide whether an Army captain and a dozen of his soldiers should share in the prize money. Captain Stephen Elliott, Jr., CSA, happened to be on board and acted as a pilot during the capture and afterward, while his men claimed to have helped bring in the prize.

On the following day, the crew was reenlisted into the Confederate States Navy, the State officers being replaced by regulars between then and June 1. Lady Davis's rifled gun remained the property of South Carolina, on loan, while the other, a 24-pounder howitzer, was a gift outright to the Confederacy. By November, Lieutenant John Rutledge commanded her.

She joined in the battle of Port Royal, South Carolina on November 7, 1861. Although her engines were transferred to CSS Palmetto State late in 1862, well built iron hulls were in great demand and she was able to continue her successful career as a privately owned blockade runner out of Charleston, South Carolina. With the occupation of Charleston in 1865 by Federal forces, Lady Davis was captured and turned over to the Light House Board by Admiral John A. Dahlgren, who praised her hull, while noting that she was, again, minus her machinery, whose disposition is not recorded.
