= CSS Savannah =

CSS Savannah is the name of two ships in the Confederate States Navy:

- CSS Savannah (gunboat), a sidewheel steamer converted to a gunboat in 1861
- CSS Savannah (ironclad), an ironclad ram launched in 1863
