= CSS Resolute =

Tugboat built in 1858

Coordinates: 32°10′34″N 81°07′40″W

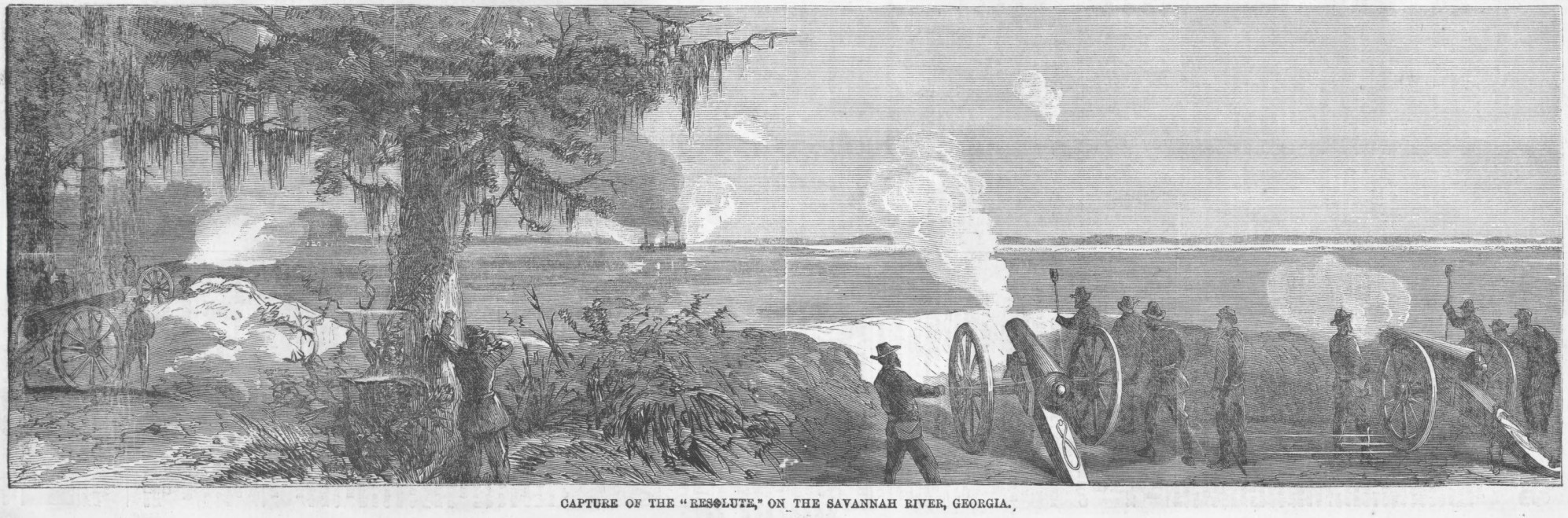
- Capture of the CSS Resolute in Savannah River, Georgia.

History

Confederate States
- Name: Resolute
- Launched: 1858
- Commissioned: 1861
- Fate: Grounded and destroyed 12 December 1864

General characteristics
- Displacement: 322 tons
- Propulsion: steam engine
- Complement: 35 officers and men
- Armament: none

CSS Resolute was a tugboat built in 1858 at Savannah Georgia as the Ajax which served in the Confederate States Navy during the American Civil War.

Resolute entered Confederate service in 1861 and operated as a tow boat, transport, receiving ship, and tender to the sidewheeler CSS Savannah on the coastal and inland waters of Georgia and South Carolina.

On 5–6 November 1861, Resolute, under Lieutenant John Pembroke Jones, CSN, in company with CSS Lady Davis, CSS Sampson, and Savannah, under the overall command of Flag Officer Josiah Tattnall III, CSN, offered harassing resistance to a much larger Union fleet preparing to attack Confederate strongholds at Port Royal Sound, S.C.

During November 7, while Resolute had been sent to Savannah with dispatches, the Union fleet under Flag Officer Samuel Francis du Pont, USN, pounded the Confederate Fort Walker and Fort Beauregard until they were abandoned. Upon her return, Resolute helped evacuate the garrison of Fort Walker and then returned to spike the Confederate guns at Pope's Landing on Hilton Head Island.

Later that month, on November 26, Resolute, in company with Sampson and Savannah, under Flag Officer Tattnall, weighed anchor from under the guns of Fort Pulaski, S.C., and made a brief attack on Union vessels at the mouth of the Savannah River. On January 28, 1862, accompanied by Sampson and Savannah, she delivered supplies to the fort despite the spirited opposition of Federal ships.

While on an expedition to destroy the Charleston and Savannah Railway bridge spanning the Savannah River, in cooperation with gunboats CSS Macon and Sampson, under Flag Officer William W. Hunter, CSN, on December 12, 1864, Resolute received heavy fire from battery I, First New York Artillery. Although hit twice, she was not seriously damaged until she was disabled in collision with the two gunboats during their retreat. Although the gunboats escaped, Resolute grounded on Argyle Island on the Savannah River. She was captured on the same day by soldiers of Company F of the 3rd Wisconsin Veteran Infantry, commanded by Captain Charles Ransom Barrager, under Colonel W. Hawly, USA, in the army of General William T. Sherman, and destroyed.
