= CSS Savannah (gunboat) =

History

Confederate States
- Name: Savannah
- Namesake: Savannah, Georgia
- Launched: 1856
- Commissioned: 1861
- Decommissioned: August 18, 1863
- Fate: Foundered in bad weather August 18, 1863

General characteristics
- Displacement: 406 tons
- Propulsion: steam engine
- Armament: 1 32-pounder cannon

CSS Savannah, later called Old Savannah and Oconee, was a gunboat in the Confederate States Navy during the American Civil War.

Savannah was formerly the steamer Everglade, built in 1856 at New York City. She was purchased early in 1861 by the State of Georgia and converted into a gunboat for coast defense. With Georgia's admission to the Confederacy, Savannah, under Lieutenant John Newland Maffitt, was commissioned by the Confederate States Navy. She was attached to the squadron of Flag Officer Josiah Tattnall III, charged with the naval defense of South Carolina and Georgia.

On November 5–6, 1861, Savannah, flying Tattnall's flag, in company with CSS Resolute, CSS Sampson, and CSS Lady Davis, offered harassing resistance to a much larger Union fleet, under Flag Officer Samuel Francis Du Pont, preparing to attack Confederate strongholds at Port Royal Sound, South Carolina On November 7, Savannah fired on the heavy Union ships as they bombarded Fort Walker and Fort Beauregard. Driven finally by the Federal gunboats into Skull Creek, Georgia, Tattnall disembarked with a landing party in an abortive attempt to support the fort's garrison, and Savannah returned to Savannah, Georgia to repair damages.

On November 26, 1861, Savannah, in company with Resolute and Sampson, all under Flag Officer Tattnall, weighed anchor from under the guns of Fort Pulaski, Georgia, and attacked Union vessels at the mouth of the Savannah River. On January 28, 1862, the same three vessels delivered supplies to the fort while evading Federal ships. Savannah later assisted in the unsuccessful defense of Fort Pulaski on April 10–11, 1862, and for the remainder of the year served as a receiving ship at the city of Savannah.

Her name was changed to Oconee on April 28, 1863, and in June she was loaded with cotton and dispatched to England to pay for much-needed supplies. After some delay she escaped to sea, only to founder on August 18 during bad weather. A boat with four officers and eleven men was captured two days later; the remainder of her crew escaped.

== See also ==
- Battle of Fort Pulaski
