= CSS Sampson =

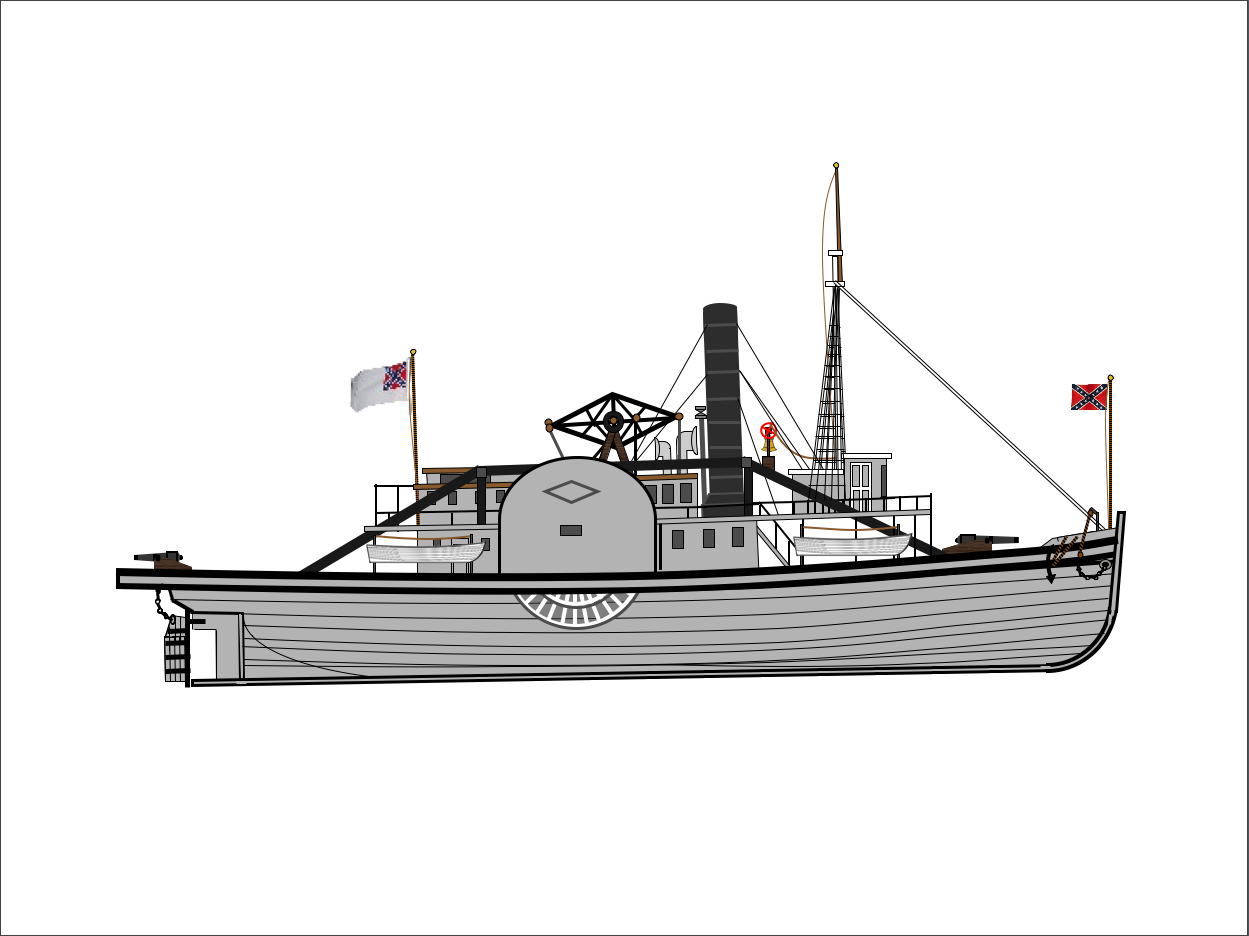
- Computer drawing of the CSS Sampson

History

Confederate States
- Name: Sampson
- Commissioned: 1861

General characteristics
- Type: Gunboat / Transport / Receiving ship
- Draught: 8 ft (2.4 m)
- Propulsion: Steam engine; Side-wheel
- Complement: 49
- Armament: 1 × 32-pdr smoothbore gun; 1 × 12-pdr gun

CSS Sampson, sometimes spelled Samson, was employed as a tugboat, prior to her purchase by the Confederate Government in 1861.

On 7 November 1861 this ship, Sampson, Lt. J. S. Kenard, CSN, stood out with other gunboats of Commodore Josiah Tattnall III's squadron to engage the heavy ships of Rear Admiral DuPont at the battle of Port Royal, South Carolina. The Confederates finally were forced to withdraw to Skull Creek. After the naval bombardment and evacuation of Port Royal's defensive works, Sampson helped transport a number of the retreating garrison to Savannah. Later in the month she exchanged shots with Federal forces off Fort Pulaski, Ga., and in January 1862, with two others of Tattnall's squadron, ran past the Federal ships in the Savannah River to provision Fort Pulaski. Sampson received considerable damage in this encounter.

Thereafter she served as receiving ship at Savannah and on 16 November 1863 returned to combat duty, patrolling the Savannah River with the defense force of Flag Officer W. W. Hunter, CSN. In early December 1864 she joined with Macon and Resolute in an expedition to destroy the Charleston and Savannah Railway bridge spanning the Savannah River, and sustained considerable damage. Prior to the capture of Savannah by General Sherman on 21 December 1864 Sampson was taken up the river to Augusta, remaining there until the end of the war.

== Commanders ==
- Lieutenant Thomas B. Mills (1862, 1864)
- Lieutenant William. W. Carnes (November 29, 1864)
