= Argyle Island =

Island in Chatham County, Georgia, United States

Coordinates: 32°10′34″N 81°07′40″W

Argyle Island is a river island in Chatham County, in the U.S. state of Georgia.

Argyle Island most likely derives its name from Archibald Campbell, 3rd Duke of Argyll.
