= CSS Savannah (ironclad) =

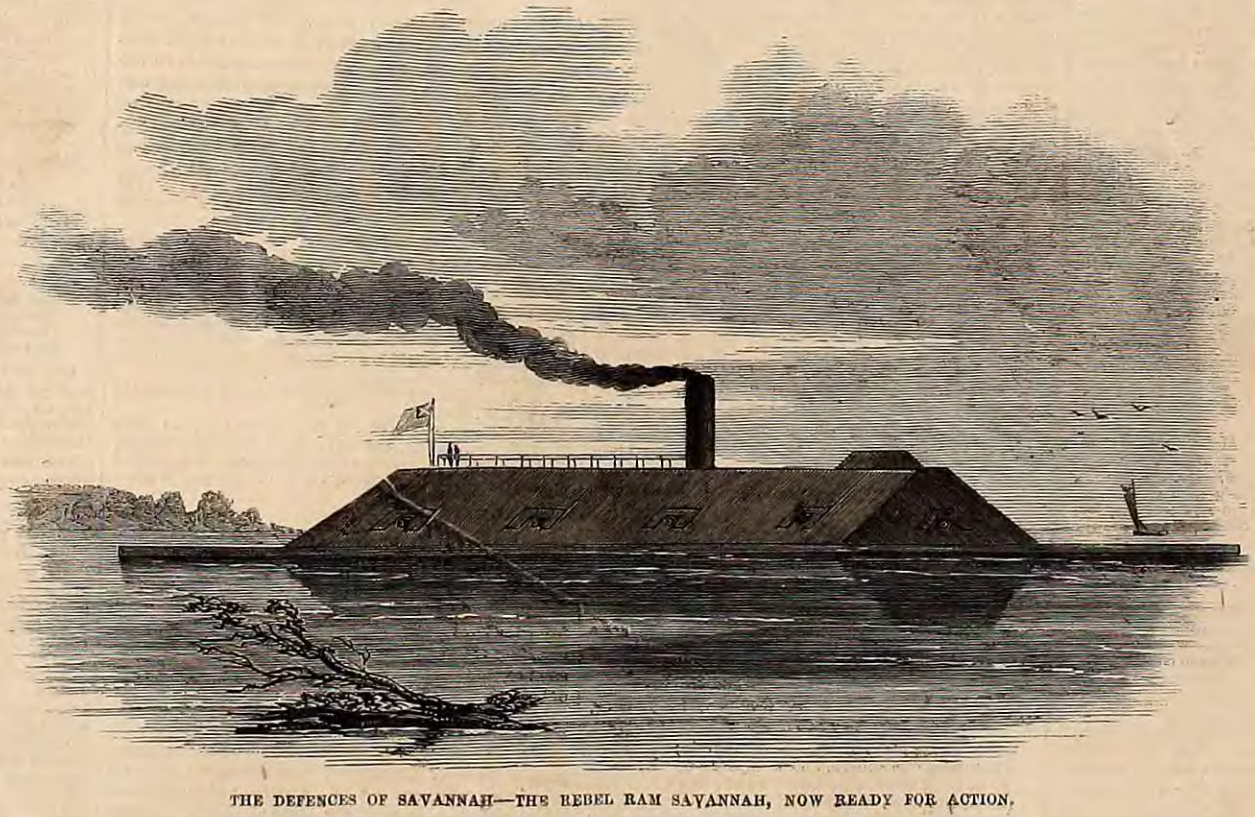
- Savannah published in Frank Leslie's Illustrated Newspaper in 1864

History

Confederate States
- Name: Savannah
- Namesake: Savannah, Georgia
- Builder: H. F. Willink
- Launched: 1863
- Commissioned: June 30, 1863
- Decommissioned: December 21, 1864
- Fate: Burned to prevent capture

General characteristics
- Length: 150 ft (46 m)
- Beam: 34 ft (10 m)
- Draft: 12 ft 6 in (3.81 m)
- Propulsion: steam engine
- Speed: 6 knots (11 km/h; 6.9 mph)
- Complement: 180 officers and men
- Armament: 2 7" rifled cannons, 2 6.4" rifled cannons

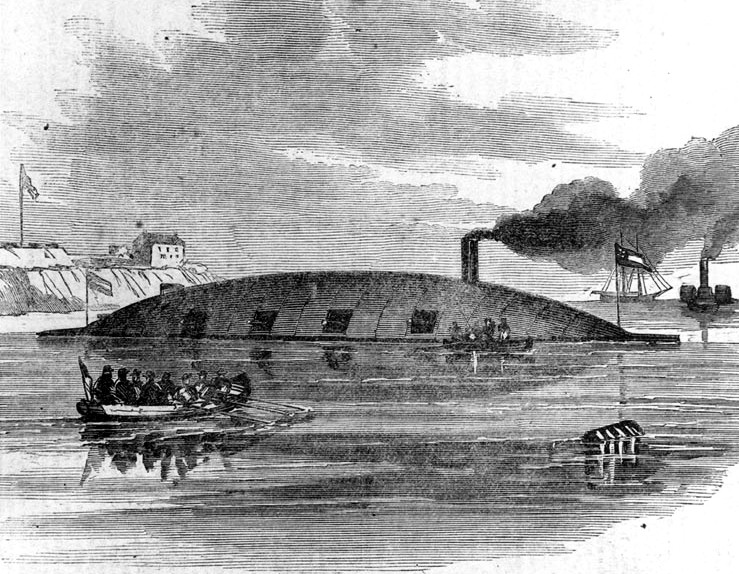
An inaccurate depiction of Savannah published in Harpers Weekly in 1863

CSS Savannah was a Richmond-class casemate ironclad in the Confederate States Navy during the American Civil War.

Savannah was built by H. F. Willink for the Confederacy at Savannah, Georgia, in 1863. On June 30, 1863, she was transferred to naval forces in the Savannah River under the command of Flag Officer William W. Hunter. Under Commander Robert F. Pinkney, she maintained her reputation as the most efficient vessel of the squadron and was kept ready for service.

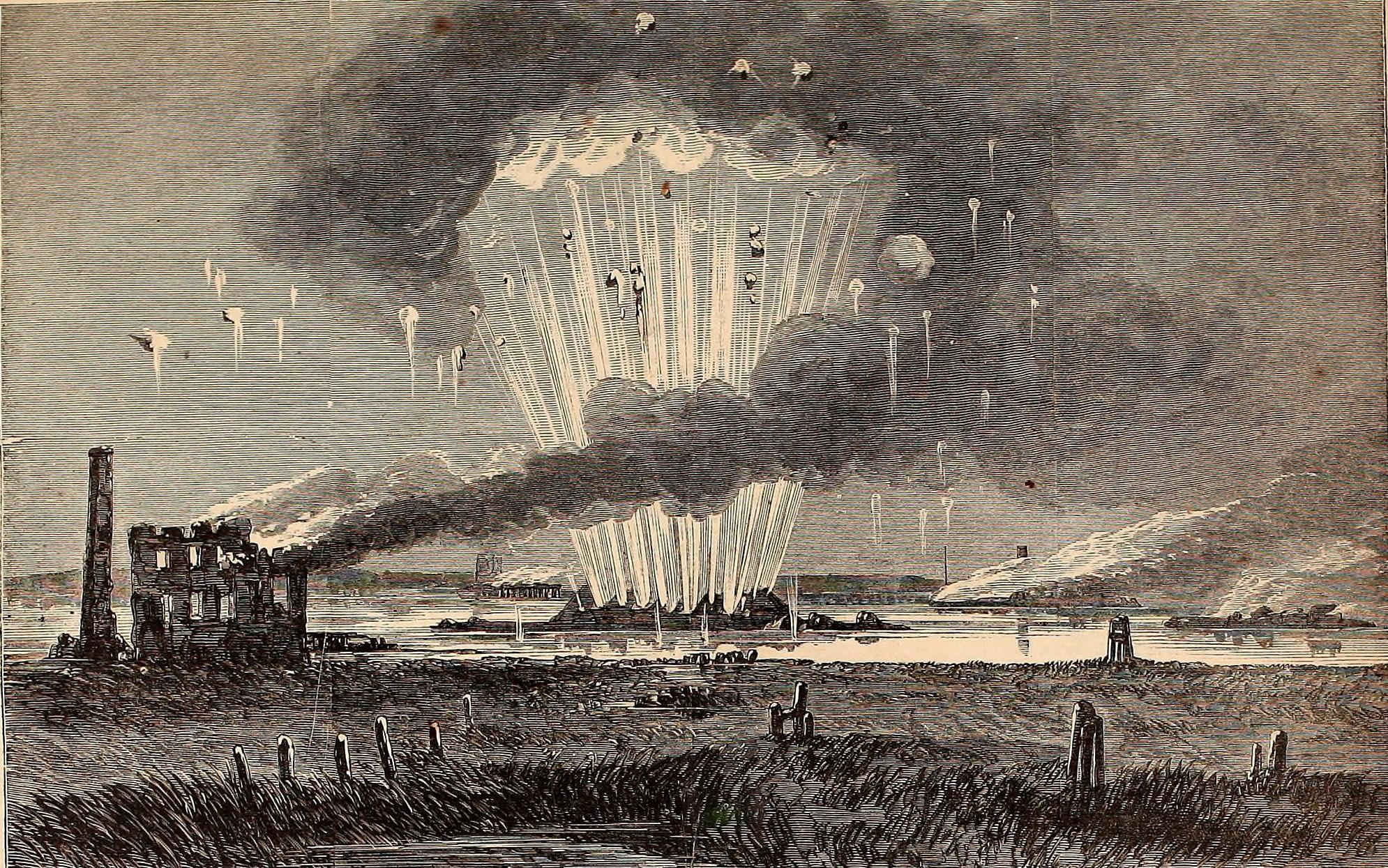
The destruction of the rebel ram Savannah by the enemy on the eve of the Federal occupation of Savannah

She remained on the river and was burned by the Confederates on December 21, 1864, when the city of Savannah was threatened by the approach of General William T. Sherman.

== Bibliography ==
- Bisbee, Saxon T. (2018). Engines of Rebellion: Confederate Ironclads and Steam Engineering in the American Civil War. Tuscaloosa, Alabama: University of Alabama Press. ISBN 978-0-81731-986-1.
- Canney, Donald L. (2015). The Confederate Steam Navy 1861-1865. Atglen, Pennsylvania: Schiffer Publishing. ISBN 978-0-7643-4824-2.
- Silverstone, Paul H. (2006). Civil War Navies 1855–1883. The U.S. Navy Warship Series. New York: Routledge. ISBN 0-415-97870-X.
- Silverstone, Paul H. (1984). Directory of the World's Capital Ships. New York: Hippocrene Books. ISBN 0-88254-979-0.
- Still, William N. Jr. (1985) [1971]. Iron Afloat: The Story of the Confederate Armorclads. Columbia, South Carolina: University of South Carolina Press. ISBN 0-87249-454-3.
