= CSS Indian Chief =

History

Confederate States
- Name: Indian Chief
- In service: 1862
- Fate: Burned, February 18, 1865

General characteristics
- Type: Receiving ship / torpedo-layer
- Sail plan: schooner

CSS Indian Chief was used as receiving ship at Charleston, South Carolina, from 1862 to 1865. One of her additional details in 1863 was support of the local torpedo (mine) operations. Flag Officer J. R. Tucker of the Confederate States Navy wrote of her commander, Lt. W. G. Dozier, 24 August 1863, "You will be pleased to have as many boats fitted with torpedoes as you can hoist up to the davits of the Indian Chief." Her first commanding officer was Lt. J. H. Ingraham. She was burned by the Confederates prior to the evacuation of Charleston on 18 February 1865.

In 1929, the wreck of Indian Chief was destroyed using dynamite during dredging operations.
