= CSS Peedee =

Confederate States of America gunboat

History

Confederate States
- Name: Peedee
- Namesake: Pee Dee River
- Builder: Peedee Naval Shipyard, South Carolina
- Commissioned: 20 April 1864
- Fate: Destroyed to prevent her capture, 18 February 1865

General characteristics
- Class & type: Macon-class gunboat
- Length: 170 ft (51.8 m)
- Beam: 26 ft (7.9 m)
- Draught: 10 ft (3.0 m)
- Propulsion: Steam engine and sails
- Speed: 10 knots (19 km/h; 12 mph)
- Complement: 91
- Armament: 1 × 1 - smoothbore 9-inch (229 mm) Dahlgren gun; 1 × 1 - Brooke 7-inch (178 mm) Muzzle-loading rifle; 1 × 1 - Brooke 6.4-inch (163 mm) Muzzle-loading rifle
- Armor: None

The CSS Peedee, also known as the CSS Pee Dee, was a Confederate gunboat launched in January 1865 and scuttled the following month during the American Civil War.

The Pee Dee was a Macon-class gunboat that was armed with two Brooke rifled cannons and a captured Union Dahlgren cannon. She was built at the Mars Bluff Navy Yard on the Great Pee Dee River in Marion County, South Carolina.

On December 21, 2010, South Carolina's state archaeologist announced that a team of researchers believed had discovered the remains of the Peedee.

It is believed that in mid-February 1865, after an inconclusive upriver skirmish with a larger Union warship, the Pee Dee's crew scuttled their ship to prevent her being captured by the enemy.

The CSS PeeDee Research and Recovery Team's dive master Bob Butler found the first of the three missing cannons of the Confederate warship PeeDee, the 9" Dahlgren, on September 17, 1995. He and the team located the second of the missing guns, a Brooke Rifled cannon, on September 23, 2006. These were the first two cannons found from the wreck of the CSS Pee Dee. “They started dismantling the vessel and burning it,” The Associated Press quoted South Carolina state archaeologist Jonathan Leader as saying "It’s a debris field."

The CSS Pee Dee's guns were located by the CSS Peedee Research and Recovery Team, directed by Bob Butler of Florence, S.C., and Ted L. Gragg of Conway, S.C. (Note: The entire record of their search, as well as more of the ship's history and that of the Mars Bluff Shipyard can be found in Guns of the Pee Dee: The Search for The Warship CSS Pee Dee's Cannons, written by Ted L. Gragg and published by Flat River Rock Publishing, ISBN 978-0-9794572-3-4.)

On September 29, 2015, a team of underwater archaeologists from the University of South Carolina raised all three cannons, which had been thrown overboard before the Peedee was scuttled. These are two Confederate-made Brooke rifled cannon and a larger captured Dahlgren cannon. The historic guns were taken to the Warren Lasch Conservation Center in North Charleston, South Carolina. In June 2019, after four years of restoration, the guns were leased by the federal government to Florence County and installed in a display at the Florence County Department of Veterans Affairs Center.
