= CSS Macon =

Confederate warship

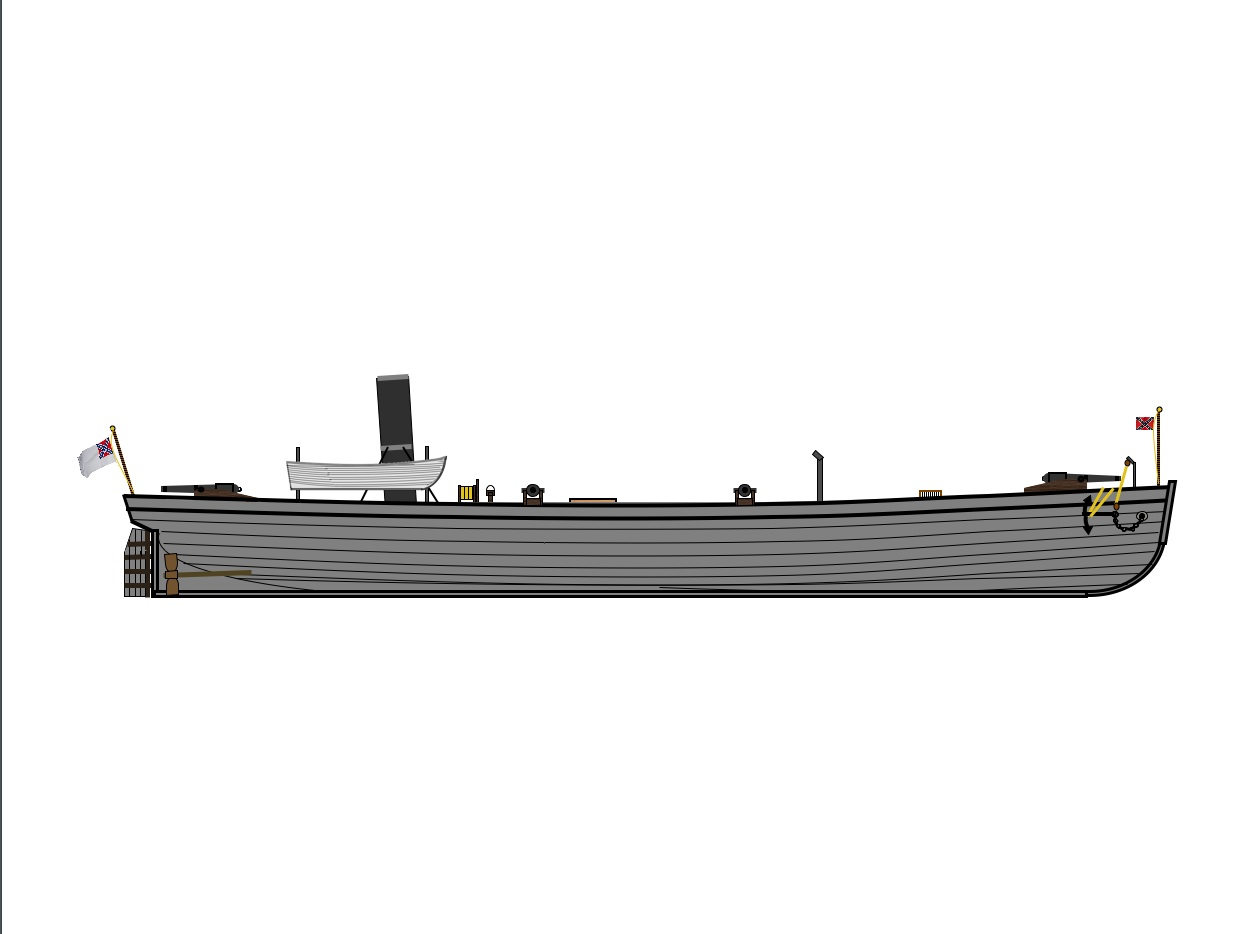
Gunboat CSS Macon

CSS Macon was a wooden-hulled gunboat ordered in 1861 from Henry F Willink's shipyard at Savannah, Georgia, as Ogeechee. There were to have been seven Macon-class vessels, but the only other one completed was CSS Peedee. Macon was 150 feet (46 m) long and 25 feet (7.6 m) wide, with a draft of 10 feet (3.0 m). She was propelled by steam machinery and twin screw propellers, which could drive the ship at 10 knots (19 km/h; 12 mph). Macon had an intended complement of 91, and was armed with six guns.

The gunboat was launched as Ogeechee in 1863, but renamed Macon in June 1864, before completion. On 3 August 1864 she was commissioned, with Lieutenant J. S. Kennard, CSN, in command, although still lacking a full complement. Macon was initially deployed in the defense of Savannah.

Savannah capitulated on 21 December and three days later Macon departed for Augusta, Georgia, where she surrendered in May 1865, at the end of the war.
