= List of shipwrecks in June 1863 =

The list of shipwrecks in June 1863 includes ships sunk, foundered, grounded, or otherwise lost during June 1863.

== 2 June ==
List of shipwrecks: 2 June 1863
Ship	State	Description
Amazonian	United States	American Civil War, CSS Alabama's South Atlantic Expeditionary Raid: The 480-ton barque, bound from New York, to Montevideo, Uruguay, with a mixed cargo that included commercial mail, was captured and burned in the South Atlantic Ocean (15°01′18″N 34°56′30″W_ by the screw sloop-of-war CSS Alabama (Confederate States Navy).
Amelia	United Kingdom	The ship was driven ashore at Bic, Province of Canada, British North America. She was on a voyage from Dublin to Quebec City, Province of Canada.
Bittern	United Kingdom	The ship was driven ashore on Green Island, British North America. She was on a voyage from Shanghai, China to Montreal, Province of Canada, British North America.
Carnatic	United Kingdom	The ship struck the East Saddles Rocks and sank. Her crew took to the boat; they were rescued on 4 June by the barque Geelong (United Kingdom). Carnatic was on a voyage from Calcutta, India to Shanghai.
Lady Peel	United Kingdom	The ship was driven ashore at Bic. She was on a voyage from Dublin to Quebec City.

== 3 June ==
List of shipwrecks: 3 June 1863
Ship	State	Description
Elizabeth Miller	United Kingdom	The schooner was driven ashore at Wick, Caithness. She was on a voyage from Sunderland, County Durham to Tongue, Sutherland. She was refloated.
Esperandzas	Spain	The steamship was wrecked in an earthquake at Manila, Spanish East Indies with the loss of all on board.
George	United Kingdom	The schooner struck a rock in the Sound of Skye and was severely damaged. She was on a voyage from Newcastle upon Tyne, Northumberland to Dublin. She was taken in to Kyleakin, Isle of Skye, Outer Hebrides in a severely leaky condition on 6 June.
Sarah and Ann	United Kingdom	The brig was run into by the steamship St. Thomas (United Kingdom) and sank at Lambton, County Durham. Her crew were rescued. She was refloated on 9 June and taken in to Sunderland, County Durham.

== 4 June ==
List of shipwrecks: 4 June 1863
Ship	State	Description
Patterson	United Kingdom	The full-rigged ship was wrecked at Bombay, India. Her crew were rescued. She was on a voyage from Bombay to London.
To Brodre	Sweden	The schooner was driven ashore on Skagen, Denmark. She was on a voyage from Newcastle upon Tyne, Northumberland, United Kingdom to a port in the Grand Duchy of Finland. She was refloated and resumed her voyage.
Viking	United States	The full-rigged ship was wrecked in the Princes Islands, Japan. All on board were rescued. She was on a voyage from Hong Kong to San Francisco, California.

== 5 June ==
List of shipwrecks: 5 June 1863
Ship	State	Description
Alabama	United Kingdom	The collier, a brig, ran aground on The Shingles, of the Isle of Wight and was wrecked. Her six crew were taken off by a pilot boat the next day. She was on a voyage from Newport, Monmouthshire to Southampton, Hampshire.
Dora	United Kingdom	The ship ran aground on the Sizewell Bank, in the North Sea off the coast of Suffolk and was damaged. She was refloated and beached at Aldeburgh, Suffolk, where she was wrecked. She was on a voyage from South Shields, County Durham to Exeter, Devon.
CSS Stono	Confederate States Navy	American Civil War, Union blockade: Pursued by the gunboat USS Wissahickon (United States Navy) while attempting to run the Union blockade with a cargo of cotton, the 382-ton sidewheel paddle steamer was wrecked in Charleston Harbor at Charleston, South Carolina on Bowman's Jetty, a breakwater near Fort Moultrie. Confederate forces burned her wreck when they evacuated Charleston in February 1865.
Pattinson	United Kingdom	The ship was abandoned off Bombay, India. Her crew were rescued. She was on a voyage from Bombay to London.
Sarah Scott	United Kingdom	The ship was abandoned in the Indian Ocean. Her crew were rescued. She was on a voyage from London to Shanghai, China.
Talisman	United States	American Civil War, CSS Alabama's South Atlantic Expeditionary Raid: The 1,237-ton clipper, on a voyage from New York to Shanghai, with a cargo of either coal or of four brass 12-pounder cannon, gunpowder, shot, two steam boilers, beef, port, and bread for a gunboat involved in the Taiping Rebellion (sources disagree), was captured and burned in the South Atlantic Ocean (14°35′42″S 36°26′45″W) by the screw sloop-of-war CSS Alabama (Confederate States Navy).
Unidentified steamer	Flag unknown	American Civil War, Union blockade: The steamer was sunk by the gunboat USS Wissahickon (United States Navy) while trying to run the Union blockade out of Charleston, South Carolina.

== 6 June ==
List of shipwrecks: 6 June 1863
Ship	State	Description
Amble	United Kingdom	The ship was driven ashore near Gallipoli, Ottoman Empire. She was on a voyage from Sulina, Ottoman Empire to Falmouth, Cornwall.
Aurora	Russia	The steamship ran aground near Kronstadt. She was refloated and taken in to Kronstadt.
Southern Cross	United States	American Civil War: The 938-ton full-rigged ship, bound from Mexico to New York with a cargo of wood, was captured and burned in the Atlantic Ocean by the screw sloop-of-war CSS Florida (Confederate States Navy).
Statesman	Confederate States of America	American Civil War, Union blockade: The gunboat USS Tahoma discovered the schooner aground at Gadsen's Point, Florida, and captured her.
Whistling Wind	United States	American Civil War: The 350-ton barque, bound from Philadelphia, Pennsylvania, to New Orleans, Louisiana, with a cargo of coal, was captured and burned in the North Atlantic Ocean off Cape Romain, South Carolina, )33°39′N 071°29′W) by the merchant raider CSS Clarence (Confederate States Navy).

== 7 June ==
List of shipwrecks: 7 June 1863
Ship	State	Description
Coburg	United Kingdom	The ship was damaged by fire at Philadelphia, Pennsylvania.
Mary	United Kingdom	The ship was abandoned in the North Sea 15 nautical miles (28 km) off the Farne Islands, Northumberland. Her crew were rescued. She was on a voyage from London to Glasgow, Renfrewshire. She was towed in to South Shields in a waterlogged condition on 12 June and it was found that six holes had been bored in her hull. An insurance claim on the ship was unsuccessful.
Roe	United Kingdom	The ship was driven ashore on the east coast of Gotland, Sweden. She was on a voyage from Vyborg, Grand Duchy of Finland to West Hartlepool, County Durham. She was refloated on 9 June.

== 8 June ==
List of shipwrecks: 8 June 1863
Ship	State	Description
Erica	United Kingdom	The schooner struck a rock and sank in Loch Eynort. She was on a voyage from South Shields, County Durham to Limerick.
Haamstede	Netherlands	The ship capsized in a squall at North Shields, Northumberland, United Kingdom.

== 9 June ==
List of shipwrecks: 9 June 1863
Ship	State	Description
Catalonian	United Kingdom	The steamship foundered in the Atlantic Ocean off Cape Finisterre, Spain with the loss of all but two of the 27 people on board. The survivors were rescued by the brigantine Angeline (United Kingdom). Catalonian was on a voyage from Porto, Portugal to Liverpool, Lancashire.
Charles H. Lunt	Bremen	The ship was driven ashore in Bamkana's Hoff. She was on a voyage from Calcutta, India to Bremen. She was refloated then next day and towed in to Bremen by the tug Samson (Bremen).
Lenox	United States	American Civil War: The barque, bound from New York City for New Orleans, Louisiana, Confederate States of America, with a mixed cargo, was captured and burned in the Gulf of Mexico off Pass-a-l'Outre, Louisiana, by a Confederate States Navy prize crew aboard the steam tug Boston (United States), which the Confederates had commandeered on 8 June.
Mary Alvina	United States	American Civil War: The brig, carrying a cargo of commissary stores, was captured and burned in the Atlantic Ocean off the Southeastern United States by the merchant raider CSS Clarence (Confederate States Navy).
William and Betsey	United Kingdom	The smack struck a sunken buoy in the River Mersey and sank. Her crew were rescued. She was on a voyage from Dublin to Liverpool.

== 10 June ==
List of shipwrecks: 10 June 1863
Ship	State	Description
Adolph, and Gosforth	Hamburg; United Kingdom	The schooner Adolph was run into and sank in the North Sea by Gosforth. Adolph's crew were rescued by Gosforth but it was then found that she was sinking and she was abandoned. All on board were rescued by Amphitrite (Hamburg). Adolph was on a voyage from the River Tees to the Elbe. Gosforth was on a voyage from Hamburg to South Shields, County Durham.
Georgetown	United Kingdom	The ship ran aground on the Kettlebottom Reef, off Barbados. She was refloated and resumed her voyage.
Mary Catherine	United Kingdom	The ship sank off Tromsø, Norway.
Mathilde	Kingdom of Hanover	The barque ran aground at the mouth of the Rio Grande. She was on a voyage from Newcastle upon Tyne, Northumberland, United Kingdom to the Rio Grande.
Petrel	(United Kingdom of Great Britain and Ireland) Tobago	The cutter was wrecked in Goldsborough Bay.
Texana	United States	American Civil War: The barque, bound from New York for New Orleans, Louisiana, with a mixed cargo, was captured and burned in the Gulf of Mexico about 35 nautical miles (65 km) off Pass-a-l'Outre, Louisiana, by a Confederate States Navy prize crew aboard the steam tug Boston (United States), which the Confederates had commandeered on 8 June.
Traveller	United Kingdom	The ship was driven ashore at "Maida". She was on a voyage from Pará, Brazil to Jamaica. She was later refloated and taken in to the Berbice River.
Ruby	United Kingdom	American Civil War, Union blockade: The 400-ton sidewheel paddle steamer, attempting to run the Union blockade to reach Nassau, Bahamas with general cargo and government property aboard, was forced aground in Lighthouse Inlet on the north end of Folly Island, South Carolina, Confederate States of America by the armed screw steamers USS Memphis and USS Stettin and the gunboat USS Ottawa (all United States) on 10–11 June. She was burned there.

== 11 June ==
List of shipwrecks: 11 June 1863
Ship	State	Description
Egberdina Annechina	Belgium	The ship foundered. Her crew were rescued by Inkermann (United Kingdom). Egberdina Annechina was on a voyage from Newcastle upon Tyne, Northumberland, United Kingdom to Trieste.
Florence Nightingale	United Kingdom	The brig was wrecked on the Sizewell Bank, in the North Sea off the coast of Suffolk. Her six crew were rescued by the Thorpeness Lifeboat. She was on a voyage from London to Seaham, County Durham.
Havelock	Confederate States of America	American Civil War, Union blockade: While trying to run the Union blockade at Charleston, South Carolina, the steamer was heavily damaged by gunfire from the screw steamers USS Memphis and USS Stettin and the gunboat USS Ottawa (all United States Navy). At daybreak on 12 June, Union forces discovered her aground off Folly Island, burning and a total wreck.
Queen	United Kingdom	The Mersey Flat sank off the Point of Ayr Lighthouse, Cheshire. Her crew were rescued. She was on a voyage from Llandulas, Anglesey to Liverpool, Lancashire.
Odd Fellow	Confederate States of America	American Civil War, Union blockade: The schooner was captured and burned by a boat crew from the armed sidewheel paddle steamer USS Coeur de Lion (United States Navy) on the Coan River in Virginia.
Sarah Margaret	Confederate States of America	American Civil War, Union blockade: The schooner was captured and burned by a boat crew in a gig from the armed sidewheel paddle steamer USS Coeur de Lion (United States Navy) on the Coan River.
Zeemeeuw	Netherlands	The barque struck the Whitby Rock. She was on a voyage from Amsterdam to Surabaya, Netherlands East Indies. She was refloated with the assistance of two tugs and towed in to South Shields, County Durham.

== 12 June ==
List of shipwrecks: 12 June 1863
Ship	State	Description
Azores	(United Kingdom of Great Britain and Ireland) Jersey	The schooner ran aground and sank at St. Ives, Cornwall. Her four crew were rescued by the St. Ives Lifeboat.
Bell	United Kingdom	The schooner sprang a leak and was beached at Grimsby, Lincolnshire. She was on a voyage from Sunderland, County Durham to London.
Celerity	United Kingdom	The ship sprang a leak and was beached at Grimsby.
CSS Clarence	Confederate States Navy	American Civil War: The crew of the merchant raider burned her in the Atlantic Ocean off Cape Hatteras, North Carolina, after transferring her weapons, equipment, and provisions to the bark Tacony (United States), which they had captured that day and which they commissioned as the merchant raider CSS Tacony (Confederate States Navy).
Emma	United Kingdom	The schooner was driven ashore at St. Ives. She was refloated.
Geemoniv	Flag unknown	The ship struck the Whitby Rock. She was on a voyage from South Shields, County Durham to "Somsberg". She was refloated and towed back to South Shields in a leaky condition.
Hinde	United Kingdom	The brig was abandoned in the Atlantic Ocean. Her crew were rescued by the schooner Comet (United Kingdom). Hinde was on a voyage from South Shields to Cádiz, Spain.
Mary A. Schindler	United States	American Civil War: During a voyage in ballast from Port Royal, South Carolina, to Philadelphia, Pennsylvania, the schooner was captured in the Atlantic Ocean off Cape Hatteras, North Carolina, Confederate States of America, by the merchant raider CSS Clarence (Confederate States Navy) when she responded to Clarence′s fake distress signal. Clarence′s crew then burned her as well as Clarence after transferring to the merchant raider CSS Tacony (Confederate States Navy).

== 13 June ==
List of shipwrecks: 13 June 1863
Ship	State	Description
Dowthorpe	United Kingdom	The ship was lost off "Pootec".
Governor van Ewyck	Flag unknown	The steamship was driven ashore on the coast of the Grand Duchy of Mecklenburg-Schwerin.
Hope	United Kingdom	The smack was driven ashore at "Aberbach", Pembrokeshire. She was on a voyage from Cardigan to Milford Haven, Pembrokeshire. Following temporary repairs, she was towed in to Newport, Monmouthshire for permanent repairs.
Jane	United Kingdom	The ship was wrecked on the Tongue Sand, in the North Sea off the coast of Kent. She was on a voyage from Hartlepool, County Durham to Sandwich, Kent.
Nadir Shah	United Kingdom	The full-rigged ship was run ashore 20 nautical miles (37 km) from Bombay, India. All on board survived. She was on a voyage from Muscat, Oman to Bombay.
Tees	United Kingdom	The ship sprang a leak and was beached at Staithes, Yorkshire. She was on a voyage from Skinningrove, Yorkshire to Newcastle upon Tyne, Northumberland. She was refloated and towed in to Whitby, Yorkshire by the tug Hilda (United Kingdom).

== 14 June ==
List of shipwrecks: 14 June 1863
Ship	State	Description
Eliza Wolsley	United Kingdom	The ship was driven ashore at Port Madoc, Caernarfonshire. She was on a voyage from Cardiff, Glamorgan to Port Madoc. She was refloated on 17 June with assistance from a tug and taken in to Port Madoc.
Good Hope	United States	American Civil War: The barque, bound from Boston, Massachusetts, to the Cape of Good Hope, Cape Colony was burned in the Atlantic Ocean by the merchant raider CSS Georgia (Confederate States Navy). Georgia had captured Good Hope on 13 June.
Honorine	France	The ship was driven ashore near Capbreton, Landes. She was on a voyage from Newcastle upon Tyne, Northumberland, United Kingdom to Fontarabia, Spain.
Mercedes	Spain	The brig was in collision with RMS Shannon (United Kingdom) and sank in the Atlantic Ocean off Saint Thomas, Virgin Islands. Her crew were rescued by RMS Shannon. Mercedes was on a voyage from the Canary Islands to Puerto Rico.
RMS Norwegian	United Kingdom	The steamship ran aground on St. Paul Island, Nova Scotia, British North America and was wrecked. All on board were rescued. She was on a voyage from Liverpool, Lancashire to Montreal, Province of Canada, British North America. She was consequently condemned.
Voyageur	United Kingdom	The ship was lost off Cape St. Mary's, Portugal. Her crew were rescued. She was on a voyage from Cádiz, Spain to Liverpool.

== 15 June ==
List of shipwrecks: 15 June 1863
Ship	State	Description
Astrakanetz	United Kingdom	The paddle steamer sprang a leak and sank in the North Sea. Her eighteen crew took to their boats; they were rescued by the schooner Anna Bertha (Prussia). Astrakanetz was on a voyage from the River Tyne to Saint Petersburg, Russia.
Hannah	(United Kingdom of Great Britain and Ireland) Guernsey	The ship was driven ashore at Great Yarmouth, Norfolk.
Joseph Seymour	United Kingdom	The ship was wrecked at Barbados. She was on a voyage from Antigua to Barbados.
Umpire	United States	American Civil War: During a voyage from Cárdenas, Cuba, to Boston, Massachusetts, with a cargo of molasses and sugar, the brig was captured and burned in the North Atlantic Ocean off the coast of Virginia, Confederate States of America (37°40′N 070°31′W) by the merchant raider CSS Tacony (Confederate States Navy).

== 16 June ==
List of shipwrecks: 16 June 1863
Ship	State	Description
Daring	United Kingdom	The sloop struck the Eddystone Rocks, Cornwall and sank. Her four crew were rescued by the fishing sloop Secret (United Kingdom). Daring was on a voyage from Salcombe, Devon to a Welsh port.

== 17 June ==
List of shipwrecks: 17 June 1863
Ship	State	Description
CSS Atlanta	Confederate States Navy	American Civil War, Battle of Wassaw Sound: The casemate ironclad ran hard aground in Wassaw Sound, Georgia, while in combat with the monitors USS Weehawken and USS Nahant and the gunboat USS Cimerone (all United States Navy) and surrendered to Weehawken. She was refloated, repaired, and placed in service as USS Atlanta.
Benjamin F. Hoxie	United States	American Civil War: The clipper, carrying a cargo of timber and silver bars from the west coast of Mexico to Falmouth, Cornwall, United Kingdom, was captured and burned off the West Indies by the screw sloop-of-war CSS Florida (Confederate States Navy).

== 18 June ==
List of shipwrecks: 18 June 1863
Ship	State	Description
Anglo-American	United States	American Civil War: The steamboat was captured and burned on Bayou Plaquemine in Louisiana, Confederate States of America by troops of the 2nd Texas Cavalry Brigade (Confederate States Army).
Belfast	United States	American Civil War: The steamboat was captured and burned on Bayou Plaquemine by troops of the 2nd Texas Cavalry Brigade (Confederate States Army).
Dorothea	Prussia	The barque sprang a leak and foundered in the Atlantic Ocean. Her ten crew took to two boats. Four of them in one of the boats were rescued by Mars (United Kingdom). Dorothea was on a voyage from the Cape Verde Islands to the Spanish Main.
Mary Jane	United Kingdom	American Civil War, Union blockade: The schooner, a blockade runner, was chased ashore and destroyed on a beach near the harbour at Clearwater, Florida, Confederate States of America (28°00′N 82°53′W) by the gunboat USS Tahoma (United States Navy).
Queen's Own	United Kingdom	The barque was damaged by fire in the East India Docks, London.
Red Gauntlet	United States	American Civil War: The 1,038-ton clipper was burned off the West Indies by the screw sloop-of-war CSS Florida (Confederate States Navy). Florida had captured her on 14 June. Red Gauntlet was on a voyage from Boston, Massachusetts to Hong Kong.
Sykes	United States	American Civil War: While stuck on a pile, the 163-ton steamer was captured and burned on Bayou Plaquemine by troops of the 2nd Texas Cavalry Brigade (Confederate States Army).
Two unidentified steam flatboats	United States	American Civil War: The two steam flatboats was captured and burned on Bayou Plaquemine by troops of the 2nd Texas Cavalry Brigade (Confederate States Army).

== 19 June ==
List of shipwrecks: 19 June 1863
Ship	State	Description
Ameise	Flag unknown	The ship was abandoned off Terschelling, Friesland, Netherlands. Her crew were rescued by Swaantje Groenendaal (Netherlands). Ameise was on a voyage from "Sudwesthorn" to Newcastle upon Tyne, Northumberland, United Kingdom.
General Simpson	United Kingdom	The full-rigged ship was wrecked a reef off "Chitbae Island", Laccadive Islands(11°40′N 72°40′E). Her crew got ashore. They were rescued on 19 July by the steamship Coromandel ( India). General Simpson was on a voyage from Bombay, India to Liverpool, Lancashire .
Maria Eliza	United Kingdom	The ship foundered 20 nautical miles (37 km) south by west of the Old Head of Kinsale, County Cork. Her crew were rescued. She was on a voyage from Bangor, Caernarfonshire to Limerick.
Mercur	Prussia	The brig was run into by the steamship Carron (United Kingdom) and sank in the River Thames at Blackwall, Middlesex, United Kingdom . She was on a voyage from Stralsund to London, United Kingdom.
Onward	(United Kingdom of Great Britain and Ireland) New Zealand	The cutter was wrecked on a sandbar at Toetoes Bay. All hands were saved.
Unnamed	United Kingdom	The Mersey Flat collided with the steamship Telegraph (United Kingdom and sank in the River Mersey at Liverpool, Lancashire.

== 20 June ==
List of shipwrecks: 20 June 1863
Ship	State	Description
CSS Lapwing	Confederate States Navy	American Civil War: The crew of the barque, in use as a tender, burned her in sight either of Barbados or Rocas Atoll and rowed to shore in one of her boats.
Micawber	United States	American Civil War: The fishing schooner was captured and burned in the Atlantic Ocean off the coast of New England by the merchant raider CSS Tacony (Confederate States Navy).

== 21 June ==
List of shipwrecks: 21 June 1863
Ship	State	Description
Byzantium	United States	American Civil War: The clipper, carrying a cargo of coal from London, United Kingdom to New York was captured and burned in the Atlantic Ocean east of New England and southeast of British North America (41°00′N 69°10′W) by the merchant raider CSS Tacony (Confederate States Navy).
Goodspeed	United States	American Civil War: Sailing from Londonderry, United Kingdom to New York in ballast, the barque was captured and burned in the North Atlantic Ocean off New England by the merchant raider CSS Tacony (Confederate States Navy).
Jane	(United Kingdom of Great Britain and Ireland) New Zealand	The cutter was wrecked during a strong gale at Auckland.
Maiden Queen	United Kingdom	The ship ran aground on the Triton Shoals, in the Paracel Islands. She was on a voyage from London to Hong Kong. She was refloated on 23 June and completed her voyage in a leaky condition.
Thomas Baker	United Kingdom	The ship ran aground on the Haisborough Sands, in the North Sea off the coast of Norfolk. She was on a voyage from London to South Shields, County Durham. She was refloated and towed in to Great Yarmouth, Norfolk in a waterlogged condition.
Thomas Prothero	United Kingdom	The ship ran aground on the Cross Sand, in the North Sea off the coast of Norfolk and sank. Her crew survived. She was on a voyage from Bo'ness, Lothian to Dieppe, Seine-Inférieure, France.
William	(United Kingdom of Great Britain and Ireland) New Zealand	The cutter was wrecked during a strong gale at Auckland.

== 22 June ==
List of shipwrecks: 22 June 1863
Ship	State	Description
Elizabeth Ann	United States	American Civil War: The 92-ton fishing schooner was captured and burned in the Atlantic Ocean off New England by the merchant raider CSS Tacony (Confederate States Navy).
Marengo	United States	American Civil War: The fishing schooner was captured and burned in the Atlantic Ocean off New England by the merchant raider CSS Tacony (Confederate States Navy).
Rufus Choate	United States	American Civil War: The 90-ton fishing schooner was captured and burned in the Atlantic Ocean off New England by the merchant raider CSS Tacony (Confederate States Navy).
Ripple	United States	American Civil War: The 64-ton fishing schooner was captured and burned in the Atlantic Ocean off New England by the merchant raider CSS Tacony (Confederate States Navy).
Royal Bride	United Kingdom	The ship was wrecked at Napier, New Zealand during a violent storm while en route from London to Auckland, New Zealand. All hands were saved.

== 23 June ==
List of shipwrecks: 23 June 1863
Ship	State	Description
Ada	United States	American Civil War: The fishing schooner was captured and burned in the Atlantic Ocean off New England by the merchant raider CSS Tacony (Confederate States Navy).
Wanderer	United States	American Civil War: The 94-ton fishing schooner was captured and burned in the Atlantic Ocean off New England by the merchant raider CSS Tacony (Confederate States Navy).

== 24 June ==
List of shipwrecks: 24 June 1863
Ship	State	Description
HMS Centaur	Royal Navy	The Centaur-class frigate ran aground off "Osimia Island", in the East Indies.
Eliza Ann	United Kingdom	The ship collided with the steamship American (United States) and was abandoned in the Atlantic Ocean. She was on a voyage from Quebec City, Province of Canada, British North America to Plymouth, Devon.
Lebanon No. 2	United States	The 254-ton sterwnheel paddle steamer struck a snag and sank at Big Hurricane, Kentucky.
USS Sumpter	United States Navy	American Civil War, Union blockade: The armed screw steamer sank in 20 minutes without loss of life in the North Atlantic Ocean off Smith Island, North Carolina, Confederate States of America (37.0968°N 75.7040°W) after colliding with the transport General Meigs (United States Army). Her crew was rescued by the sloop-of-war USS Jamestown (United States Navy).

== 25 June ==
List of shipwrecks: 25 June 1863
Ship	State	Description
Fanny and Betty	United Kingdom	The ship was wrecked on Skomer, Pembrokeshire. She was on a voyage from Newport, Monmouthshire to Aberystwyth, Cardiganshire.
CSS Tacony	Confederate States Navy	American Civil War: The crew of the merchant raider, a barque, burned her in the North Atlantic Ocean off the coast of Maine, United States after transferring her weapons, equipment, and provisions to the fishing schooner Archer (United States), which they had captured that day and which they commissioned as the merchant raider CSS Archer (Confederate States Navy).
Victor Jules	France	The ship was lost in the Raz de Sein. Her crew were rescued. She was on a voyage from Paimbœuf, Loire-Inférieure to Cardiff, Glamorgan, United Kingdom.

== 26 June ==
List of shipwrecks: 26 June 1863
Ship	State	Description
Pelican	United Kingdom	The ship was driven ashore on Holy Isle, in the Firth of Clyde. She was on a voyage from Ardrossan, Ayrshire to Fleetwood, Lancashire.

== 27 June ==
List of shipwrecks: 27 June 1863
Ship	State	Description
USRC Caleb Cushing	United States Revenue-Marine	Harper's Weekly illustration of USRC Caleb Cushing burning. American Civil War, Battle of Portland Harbor: The United States Revenue-Marine cutter, seized earlier in the day while in port at Portland, Maine, and taken to sea by a raiding party from the merchant raider CSS Archer (Confederate States Navy), was set afire and abandoned by the Confederates while in action with a flotilla of Union steamers and tugs in the North Atlantic Ocean off Portland. She exploded when the flames reached her ammunition magazine.
Diadem	(United Kingdom of Great Britain and Ireland) British North America	The barque was wrecked. Her crew were rescued by the Rhoscolyn Lifeboat.
Jantina	Netherlands	The galiot sank of Great Orme Head, Caernarfonshire, United Kingdom. Her eight crew survived. She was on a voyage from Liverpool, Lancashire, United Kingdom to a Baltic port.
Vigilant	United Kingdom	The schooner ran aground on Taylor's Bank, in Liverpool Bay and capsized. Her crew were rescued by the New Brighton Lifeboat. She was on a voyage from Liverpool, Lancashire to Anstruther, Fife.

== 28 June ==
List of shipwrecks: 28 June 1863
Ship	State	Description
Celtina	United Kingdom	The ship sank off Skagen, Denmark. She was on a voyage from Lemvig, Denmark to Macduff, Aberdeenshire.
Chaseley	United Kingdom	The barque ran aground on the Shipwash Sand, in the North Sea off the coast of Suffolk. She was on a voyage from South Shields, County Durham to Aden. She was refloated on 30 June and taken in to The Downs.
Gutenberg	United Kingdom	The schooner was driven ashore at the mouth of the River Tay. She was on a voyage from Dundee, Forfarshire to Warkworth, Northumberland. She was refloated and resumed her voyage.
Rob Roy	United Kingdom	The tug sank at Dundee, Forfarshire. She was refloated the next day, repaired and returned to service.
St. Andrew	United Kingdom	The full-rigged ship was wrecked off the mouth of the Andoni River, Africa. Her crew were rescued. She was on a voyage from Old Calabar to Liverpool, Lancashire.

== 29 June ==
List of shipwrecks: 29 June 1863
Ship	State	Description
Halifax	(United Kingdom of Great Britain and Ireland) British North America	The ship was abandoned in the Atlantic Ocean off Ouessant, Finistère, France. She was on a voyage from Saint John's, Newfoundland to Havre de Grâce, Seine-Inférieure, France.
Hiawatha	United Kingdom	The ship was abandoned in the Atlantic Ocean. Her crew were rescued.
Jane	United Kingdom	The ship sprang a leak and sank in the North Sea. Her crew were rescued by Heinrich (Flag unknown). Jane was on a voyage from Nyköping, Sweden to London.
Jumna	United Kingdom	The whaler, a steamship, was lost in ice in Melville Bay. Her crew were rescued.
Lady Sale	United Kingdom	The whaler, a steamship was lost in ice in Melville Bay. Her crew were rescued.
Pacific	United Kingdom	The whaler, a steamship was lost in ice in Melville Bay. Her crew were rescued.

== 30 June ==
List of shipwrecks: 30 June 1863
Ship	State	Description
Fanny A. Garriques	(United Kingdom of Great Britain and Ireland) New Zealand	The brig went ashore at Palliser Bay during a heavy storm while en route from Dunedin to Wellington, with the loss of one life.
Macao	United Kingdom	The barque was wrecked near the Shanghai Lighthouse. She was on a voyage from Manila, Spanish East Indies to Shanghai, China.

== Unknown date ==
List of shipwrecks: Unknown date in June 1863
Ship	State	Description
Auguste	Bremen	The ship was driven ashore in the Weser. She was on a voyage from Baltimore, Maryland, United States to Bremen.
Banshee	United States	The ship was damaged by fire at Wilmington, Delaware before 20 June.
Boyne	United Kingdom	The ship was wrecked at "Hoodedah", on the Indian coast with the loss of nearly 400 lives. She was on a voyage from Bombay, India to Aden.
Britannia	United Kingdom	The ship was driven ashore at Bideford, Devon. She was on a voyage from a Welsh port to Bideford. She capsized on 18 June with the loss of one life.
Cambria	United Kingdom	The ship was driven ashore and wrecked at "Muntane", British North America. She was on a voyage from Quebec City, Province of Canada, British North America to Dundee, Forfarshire.
Eagle	United Kingdom	The ship was abandoned in the Atlantic Ocean in a waterlogged condition before 24 June.
Filandia	United Kingdom	The ship was driven ashore near Huelva, Spain. She was on a voyage form Alexandria, Egypt to Queenstown, County Cork.
Humming Bird	United Kingdom	The ship struck a rock at Saint Domingo and was wrecked.
Ilmari	Russia	The ship was wrecked in the White Sea near "Sosnovetz" before 20 June. Her crew were rescued. She was on a voyage from Hull, Yorkshire to Onega.
J. Stanfield	United Kingdom	The ship was driven ashore at Stornoway, Isle of Lewis, Outer Hebrides. She was on a voyage from Stettin to Campbeltown, Argyllshire. She was refloated and found to be severely leaky.
Mabley	United Kingdom	The ship was abandoned in the Atlantic Ocean in a waterlogged condition before 24 June.
Maria Teresa	United Kingdom	The ship ran aground at Limerick. She was on a voyage from Limerick to Sulina, Ottoman Empire.
Mary Block	United Kingdom	The ship was driven ashore at Métis, Province of Canada.
Mississippi	Italy	The full-rigged ship ran aground on the Garbutt Sand before 16 June and was damaged. She was refloated and beached on the coast of Norfolk, United Kingdom. She was later refloated and taken in to Great Yarmouth, Norfolk.
Neva	United Kingdom	The brig was wrecked on Anticosti Island, Nova Scotia, British North America before 15 June and was subsequently destroyed by fire. Her crew took to two boats; they were rescued by Florine (United Kingdom) and a Norwegian barque. Neva was on a voyage from Sunderland, County Durham to Montreal, Province of Canada.
Oregon	United States	The ship was wrecked in Camanm Bay, Brazil. She was on a voyage from Caamanm Bay to Liverpool, Lancashire, United Kingdom.
Pensioner	United Kingdom	The ship was abandoned in the Atlantic Ocean in a waterlogged condition before 24 June.
Perle	United Kingdom	The schooner was lost in the Ethiopian Archipelago, north east of Madagascar. All on board were rescued.
Quebec	United Kingdom	The ship was abandoned in the Atlantic Ocean in a waterlogged condition before 24 June.
Romanoff	Russia	The barque sank in the Swer River.
Runa	United Kingdom	The ship was driven ashore. She was on a voyage from Riga, Russia to Bridport, Dorset. She was refloated and put in to Helsingør, Denmark.
Snow	United Kingdom	The ship foundered in the Atlantic Ocean. She was on a voyage from London to Quebec City.
Sophia	Sweden	The schooner was driven ashore on Dagö, Russia before 15 June. She was on a voyage from "Sundvig" to Hull, Yorkshire, United Kingdom. She was refloated and put in to Copenhagen, Denmark in a leaky condition.
Sunniside	United Kingdom	The barque was driven ashore on Uist, Outer Hebrides. She was later refloated and towed in to Stornoway by the tug Flying Meteor (United Kingdom). She arrived on 1 July.
Switzerland	United Kingdom	The ship was wrecked on Flores Island, Azores before 16 June. She was on a voyage from Dundee, Forfarshire to Callao, Peru.
T. F. Parke	United Kingdom	The ship was driven ashore at Matane, Province of Canada. She was condemned. She was later refloated and taken in to Quebec City, where she arrived on 27 August.
Thomas	United Kingdom	The ship foundered in the Atlantic Ocean before 9 June. She was on a voyage from London to Quebec City.
