= USS Adela =

Gunboat of the United States Navy

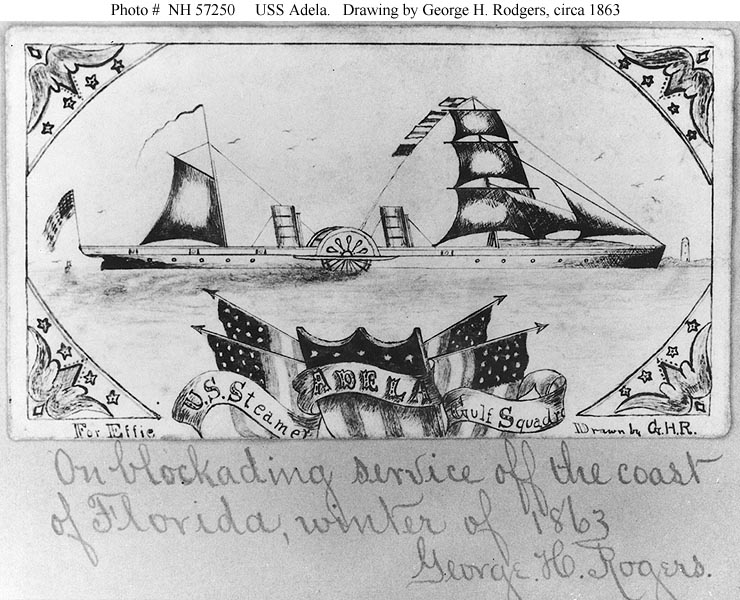
- USS Adela (1863–1865) Drawing by George H. Rogers, depicting the ship "on blockading service off the coast of Florida, winter of 1863". The artist served on board Adela as a Pharmacist's Mate.

History

United States
- Name: USS Adela
- Launched: circa 1862
- Acquired: 23 May 1863
- Commissioned: circa 13 June 1863
- Decommissioned: 1865
- Fate: Sold, 30 November 1865

General characteristics
- Displacement: 585 tons
- Length: 211 ft (64 m)
- Beam: 23 ft 6 in (7.16 m)
- Draft: 9 ft 3 in (2.82 m)
- Depth of hold: 12 ft (3.7 m)
- Propulsion: steam engine; side wheel-propelled
- Speed: 12 knots (22 km/h; 14 mph)
- Complement: 70
- Armament: two 20-pounder Parrott rifles; four 24-pounder smoothbores

USS Adela was a steamer captured by the Union Navy during the American Civil War. She was used by the Union Navy as a gunboat in support of the Union Navy blockade of Confederate waterways.

== Service history ==
=== Confederate blockade runner ===
In the spring of 1862, when the American Civil War was about a year old, Adela – a fast, iron-hulled, sidewheel steamer which had been operating out of Belfast, Ireland, as a merchantman—was purchased by some now unidentified agent who planned to use her for carrying arms and other contraband cargo through the Union blockade to the Confederacy. She steamed in ballast via Glasgow to Liverpool in May and—toward the end of that month—cleared the latter port, bound for the Bahamas where she planned to fill her holds with ordnance for the Confederate forces. After a stop en route at Bermuda, the ship got underway on 4 July and headed for the island of New Providence in the Bahamas to take on her forbidden cargo at Nassau and to prepare for a dash through the Union blockade. Shortly after dawn on the 7th, lookouts on Northern warships, USS Quaker City and USS Huntsville, spotted the would-be blockade runner northwest of Great Abaco Island, endeavoring to evade them. The blockaders immediately gave chase.

As the three speeding vessels approached New Providence, Quaker City hoisted the Stars and Stripes and fired a shell across Adela's bow, signaling her to heave to. After the fleeing steamer had ignored not only that round, but a second in the same direction and two more behind her stern, Quaker City sent a fifth shell directly into her stubborn quarry. Nevertheless, despite having taken a damaging direct hit, the sidewheeler continued her efforts to get away. Finally, a sixth shot into Adela's beam persuaded her commanding officer, James Walker—a former master of the Cunard Line's famed sidewheeler Great Eastern – to stop. A prize crew from Quaker City boarded the British steamer, and the Union warship towed the captured vessel to Key West, Florida, where she was turned over to the Admiralty court.

British authorities strongly protested this action by the Union blockaders, demanding the release of the ship and of two bags of mail which the prize had been carrying. One had been taken on board at Liverpool and the other at Bermuda. The ensuing protracted diplomatic relations delayed the United States attorney at Key West as he attempted to press charges against the ship, but did not save her from ultimate condemnation. The Union case was strengthened by the fact that Adela's master removed the mail bags from the courthouse and destroyed their contents which was thereafter presumed to contain evidence of forbidden activity. Once the vessel finally had been condemned, the Navy purchased her on 23 May 1863.

=== Union Navy career ===
The former blockade runner was then fitted out at the New York Navy Yard for blockade duty off the Confederate coast. No logs for the ship seem to have survived, and no other documents have been found which record the date of her being placed in commission by the Union Navy. However, we do know that her active service began on or before 13 June 1863, for on that night Adela – commanded by Acting Volunteer Lt. Louis N. Stodder (Note: Stodder was Acting Master and turret officer on the famous ironclad USS Monitor and fought in the Battle of Hampton Roads) left the navy yard, bound for Key West, Florida, to join the East Gulf Blockading Squadron. Meanwhile, during the time Adela was being prepared for active service, CSS Florida and CSS Clarence – a Northern merchant brig which the former Confederate cruiser had captured on 6 May 1863, armed, and commissioned as a raider—were causing great consternation among merchants in the North by voraciously preying upon Union shipping. As a result, on 13 June 1863—the day of Adela's first getting underway as a Union warship – Secretary of the Navy Gideon Welles telegraphed the commandant of the New York Navy Yard orders to send whatever vessels he had available to sea in pursuit of Clarence. Adela was one of the vessels that responded to this call to action. Word of her new mission overtook her in the wee hours of the 14th while she was still in the vicinity of New York; and she cruised south as far as Ocracoke Inlet, North Carolina, overhauling and boarding every vessel that she encountered. The papers of each were found to be in order, and all were allowed to resume their voyages.

She put into Hampton Roads, Virginia, on the 18th to re-coal and to obtain further orders. Welles wired Stodder instructions to resume the hunt; and, after getting underway again on the 20th, Adela sailed off Indian River Inlet, searching for USS Tacony. On 12 June 1863, the Confederate naval officer, Lt. Charles William Read, in CSS Clarence had captured the bark Tacony and, upon learning from the prize's log that she was a faster sailer than Clarence, transferred his crew and ordnance to Tacony and burned Clarence. Stodder then returned to sea and heard from a passing merchantman that Tacony had been seen heading southeast. Adela cruised unsuccessfully in that direction until her depleted bunkers prompted Stodder to change to a southwesterly course toward Port Royal, South Carolina. After taking on coal at that Union naval base, the ship got underway on 30 June and arrived in Hampton Roads, Virginia, of the morning of 3 July.

Meanwhile, Lt. Read—after learning from prisoners captured in his prizes that many Union warships were at sea searching for Tacony – had again changed ships, shifting to the captured schooner Archer on the night of 24 and 25 June. In her he entered the harbor at Portland, Maine, during the evening twilight of the 26th and anchored without arousing suspicion. At 0130 the following morning, he and most of his men clambered up the sides of Caleb Gushing and took over that revenue cutter from her astonished and sleepy crew. However, Read's spectacular series of successes was nearing its climax. He was forced to surrender at 1130 to the commandeered Boston Line steamer Forrest City. Thus, the end of the threat from Lt. Read, the ship-hopping commerce raider, freed Adela to turn her attention back to her original assignment, service in the East Gulf Blockading Squadron. She steamed from the Virginia Capes back to New York for voyage repairs and re-provisioning at the New York Navy Yard.

On 7 July, Gideon Welles ordered Stodder ". . . to proceed with the U.S.S. Adela to Key West . . . ," but the steamer was not ready until late in the month and departed New York on the 30th. No record of her voyage to Florida waters seems to have survived, but the ship must have reached Key West, Florida, by 28 August, for she was then under orders to take blockade station off St. Andrew Sound. The steamer served in that body of water until the later part of September, when she proceeded to Tampa Bay to relieve the screw gunboat Sagamore which had been patrolling there.

On 13 October, USS Tahoma joined Adela in Tampa Bay. That screw gunboat's commanding officer, Lt. Comdr. Alexander A. Semmes, had instructions from the commandant of the East Gulf Blockading Squadron, Rear Admiral Theodorus Bailey, to land an armed expedition—manned by detachments from Adela and his own ship—to destroy two blockade runners that were reportedly anchored in the Hillsborough River, loading cotton. On the morning of the 16th, the two Northern warships moved in closer to Tampa, Florida, and, when some 2,000 yards from Fort Brooke, began bombarding the batteries which protected the town. The shelling was primarily intended to divert the attention of Confederate forces from the real purpose of expedition—the blockade runners. To confirm the false impression that the Union forces intended to land northeast of the fort, Semmes had some stakes placed in that vicinity. The ruse seems to have succeeded for his report of the expedition stated that ". . . that night quite a force was sent there to oppose a landing."

When the guns in Fort Brooke did not respond to the fire from the gunboats, Tahoma and Adela slackened the pace of their cannonade, but fired intermittently thereafter until they withdrew late in the afternoon. Then, under cover of darkness, they lowered several boats and filled them with 100 men—60 from Tahoma and 40 from Adela – several officers, and a guide. The men pulled stealthily for shore, landed on the western shore of Old Tampa Bay, and marched some 14 miles through the dark swampland to the Hillsboro River. The guide who directed the Union sailors to the blockade runners, Mr. James Henry Thompson—a resident of Florida loyal to the Union—was so ill that he had to be carried on a litter. When they finally reached the river bank they found the blockade runners—steamer Scottish Chief and sloop Kate Dale – floating in the stream. The men from the Northern ships put the torch to both vessels and, once sure that the cotton-laden Confederate ships were ablaze and damaged beyond possible salvage, retired along the path whence they had come.

However, two men escaped from the burning ships, fled to Tampa, Florida, and alerted Southern defense forces of the Northern raid. As the Union sailors neared the shore, they encountered and attacked an armed Confederate scouting party dressed in civilian garb. In the ensuing melee, they captured two of the Southerners before the others took to their heels. A short time later, the Yankees emerged on the beach, only to learn that mounted Confederate troops, reinforced by infantry, were lurking in the woods nearby. Meanwhile, lookouts on the Union gunboats spotted their returning shipmates; and, almost immediately, boats were lowered and their crews began pulling for shore. Then the Southerners opened fire from the forest and managed to kill two sailors, to wound 10 others—one mortally, and to capture five. The rest of the raiders entered the boats and returned safely to their ships. During the fighting ashore, Adela shelled the thicket to help the landing party to re-embark. Among the casualties suffered by the landing force, one of the two killed outright was from Adela's crew and one of her four wounded died soon after returning. One of her men was captured.

Soon after participating in this successful but costly action, Adela moved to St. George's Sound, took station off the East Pass to that body of water before the end of October, and served well into the spring of 1864. The most interesting event during her protracted service at that place did not involve her directly. Early in May, Confederate forces completed plans for a joint Army-Navy operation whose ". . . object was . . ."in the words of Lt. William Budd of the Union converted ferryboat Somerset, " ... the capture of the U.S.S. Adela, intending in the event of their being successful, to carry her into Mobile, or to burn her ..." Budd learned of this plan and, on the night of 12 May, landed an expedition from his ship and the schooner USS James S. Chambers near the town of Apalachicola, Florida. This group of fighting Union sailors dispersed the Confederate forces as they were embarking and captured six of their seven boats, a large amount of equipment, and four of their men.

About this time, Adela shifted to the West Pass of St. George's Sound and was stationed there into August when she shifted to the West Pass of Apalachicola, Florida. She served at that post into September when she moved to St. Marks, Florida. The steamer was back off St. George's Sound—this time the middle entrance—on 6 November when a lookout on the masthead reported a strange sail. When Stodder ordered his engineers to get up steam, the stranger headed close to the breakers. Adela then launched her boats which rowed through the dangerous surf and took possession of the Confederate schooner Badger. The Southern vessel had just left St. Marks, bound for Havana, Cuba, laden with cotton. Later in the month, Adela steamed north to New York. Following repairs in the navy yard there which lasted until late in March, the ship was assigned to the Potomac Flotilla, and she guarded the water approaches to Washington, D.C., during the troubled days following the assassination of President Lincoln. After the Potomac Flotilla was disbanded at the end of July, the ship returned to New York. Since her logs have apparently not survived, the ship decommissioning date is unknown, but she was sold at public auction at New York City on 30 November 1865. Her subsequent career remains a mystery.
