= Charles Steedman =

US Navy admiral (1811–1890)

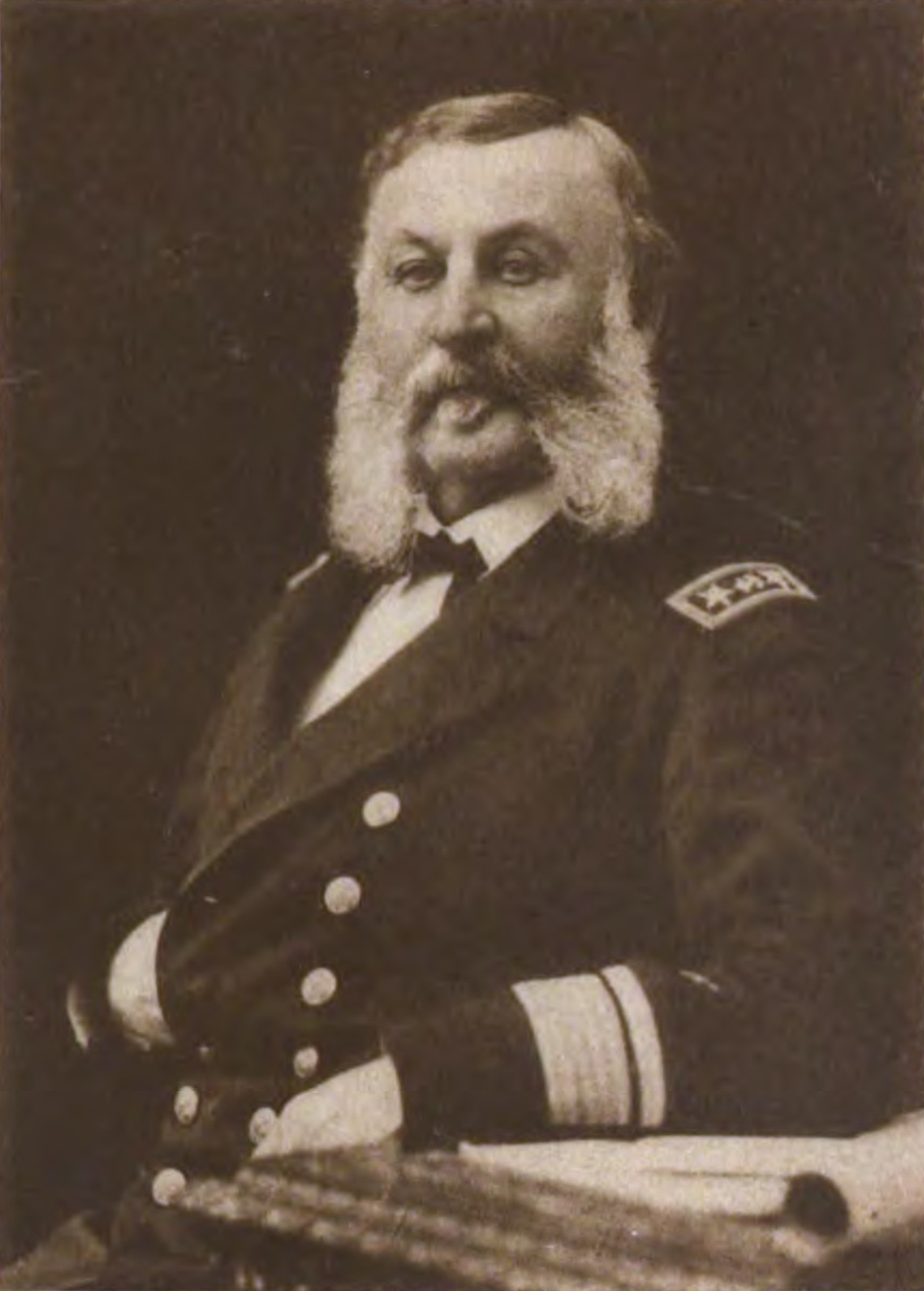
- Born: 24 September 1811; Charleston County, South Carolina
- Died: 13 November 1890 (aged 79) Washington, D.C.
- Allegiance: United States of America
- Branch: United States Navy; Union Navy
- Service years: 1828–1873
- Rank: Rear Admiral
- Commands: South Pacific Squadron; Boston Navy Yard; USS Colorado; USS Ticonderoga; USS Powhatan; USS Paul Jones; USS Bienville; Maryland; Brazil Squadron (Acting); USS Dolphin
- Conflicts: Mexican–American War; Paraguay Expedition; American Civil War

Charles Steedman (24 September 1811 – 13 November 1890) (Note: Some sources give his date of birth as 20 September 1811, but 24 September 1811 is more consistent with his retirement date and memorial inscription.) was a United States Navy rear admiral. He served as commander of the South Pacific Squadron from 1872 to 1873. Steedman fought in the Mexican–American War and, though a South Carolinian, served in the Union Navy during the American Civil War.

== Biography ==
Steedman was born on his father's plantation in the parish of St. James, Santee, Charleston County, South Carolina in 1811. His family moved to Charleston in 1824. He joined the U.S. Navy as a midshipman on 1 April 1828.

=== Early military career ===
After attending the naval school at the New York Navy Yard, Steedman served in the Caribbean aboard the sloops-of-war Natchez and Fairfield and the schooner Grampus. He was promoted to passed midshipman on 14 January 1834.

From 1836 to 1838, Steedman served aboard the frigates Constitution and United States and the schooner Shark in the Mediterranean. He then served aboard the frigate Macedonian back in the Caribbean. Steedman was made master in early 1839 and acting lieutenant later that same year. He was promoted to lieutenant on 25 February 1841.

Steedman served aboard the brig Dolphin on the Atlantic coast and in the Caribbean until 1842 and then participated in the coast survey from 1843 to 1844. From 1845 to 1847, he served aboard the sloop-of-war St. Mary's in the Caribbean and Gulf of Mexico. In the Mexican–American War, Steedman commanded her eight-inch guns during the bombardment of Vera Cruz and her ship's launch during a surprise attack at Tampico.

From 1847 to 1849, Steedman was assigned to the United States Naval Observatory in Washington, D.C. From 1850 to 1851, he served aboard the frigate Cumberland in the Mediterranean. From 1853 to 1855, Steedman was back at the Naval Observatory. He was promoted to commander on 14 September 1855.

In 1858, Steedman joined the Brazil Squadron as commander of the brig Dolphin. He participated in the Paraguay Expedition and then served as acting commander of the squadron for nine months between the departure of Flag Officers French Forrest and William B. Shubrick and the arrival of Flag Officer Joshua R. Sands. Steedman returned to the United States in December 1860.

=== American Civil War ===
After the outbreak of the Civil War, Steedman was given command of the Baltimore Railroad Company steamboat Maryland by Captain Samuel F. Du Pont. He was responsible for maintaining communications between Annapolis and Havre-de-Grace in the northern Chesapeake Bay, Maryland. When Du Pont's other vessels had aided the landing of Brigadier General Benjamin F. Butler's Union troops at Annapolis in April 1861 to restore communications with Washington, Steedman relayed the news to Major General Robert Patterson in Philadelphia via telegraph from Havre-de-Grace. After regular communication lines between Washington, Baltimore and Philadelphia had been fully restored, he was sent to join Captain Andrew H. Foote's force in the Mississippi Valley.

On 23 October 1861, Steedman assumed command of the newly commissioned side-wheel steamer Bienville. On 7 November 1861, his ship led the second column of Union vessels at the Battle of Port Royal in South Carolina. He then participated in the blockade and capture of Southern ports on the Georgia coast.

On 9 June 1862, Steedman assumed command of the newly commissioned side-wheel steam gunboat Paul Jones. As part of Rear Admiral Du Pont's gunboat squadron, he led an attack by four gunboats on Fort McAllister at Savannah, Georgia on 29 July 1862, but withdrew after exchanging fire with the Confederate batteries for about ninety minutes. On 17 September 1862, his ship's guns engaged with the shore batteries on St. Johns Bluff in Florida. Afterwards, he recommended to Rear Admiral Du Pont that the mouth of the St. Johns River would best be secured by landing Union soldiers near the bluff. This was accomplished at the beginning of October 1862 when troops led by Brigadier General John M. Brannan captured the heights from Confederate forces in the Battle of St. Johns Bluff with the support of Du Pont's gunboats. Steedman then helped to patrol the river up to Lake George.

In March 1863, Steedman was notified of his promotion to captain with seniority from 13 September 1862. In April 1863, he assumed command of the side-wheel steam frigate Powhatan and participated in the blockade of his hometown of Charleston. On 2 October 1863, his ship arrived in Philadelphia with the captured ironclad ram CSS Atlanta in tow.

On 17 October 1863, Steedman received orders to take command of the screw sloop-of-war Ticonderoga. His ship was employed in detached service, including an unsuccessful hunt for the sloop-of-war CSS Florida off the coast of Brazil. In November 1864, she returned to Philadelphia for engine repair. After temporary repairs, she participated in the First and Second Battles of Fort Fisher at Wilmington, North Carolina in December 1864 and January 1865. Steedman then resumed blockade duty at Charleston until March 1865, when Ticonderoga returned to Philadelphia for more permanent engine repairs.

=== Later military career ===
In November 1865, Ticonderoga joined Rear Admiral Louis M. Goldsborough's European Squadron in the Mediterranean. In September 1866, Steedman was notified of his promotion to commodore with seniority from 25 July 1866. He exchanged command of Ticonderoga and the steam screw frigate Colorado with Captain Robert H. Wyman in early 1867. Steedman returned to the United States aboard Colorado in September 1867.

From 1869 to 1872, Steedman served as commandant of the Boston Navy Yard. On 25 May 1871, he was promoted to rear admiral. On 10 October 1872, Steedman assumed command of the South Pacific Station at Panama from Commodore Roger N. Stembel. His flagship was the screw steamer Pensacola. On 22 September 1873, he was relieved of command at Panama by Rear Admiral John J. Almy. On 24 September 1873, Steedman retired from the U.S. Navy after forty-five years of military service, having reached the mandatory retirement age of sixty-two.

== Personal ==
Steedman was the son of Charles John Steedman (9 November 1783 – 28 April 1838) and his wife Mary Blake. His grandfather James Steedman was an architect born in Scotland and his other grandfather John Blake was a planter born in England. His father left their plantation, which he inherited from his wife's father, to serve in the militia during the War of 1812. He was later elected to the South Carolina House of Representatives.

On 7 February 1843, Steedman married Sarah Bishop in Philadelphia at the home of her adoptive father Richard Ronaldson, the former owner of the Binny & Ronaldson type foundry. They had four daughters and two sons. Their second daughter died in childhood.

On 13 November 1890, Steedman died at his home in Washington, D.C. After a funeral service at St. John's Church in Washington on 17 November, his remains were sent by train to Boston for burial at Mount Auburn Cemetery. A memorial was also erected at Arlington National Cemetery.

On 27 February 1913, Steedman was reinterred under his memorial at Arlington after the rules regarding cenotaphs there were changed. His wife Sarah's remains were not moved from Mount Auburn, but their son U.S. Army Colonel Richard Ronaldson Steedman (13 October 1855 – 30 December 1922) and his wife Jessie were later interred beside him at Arlington.
