= Fortunato Arriola =

Mexican-born American painter (1827–1872)

- Born: 1827; Cosalá, Sinaloa, Mexico
- Died: August 15, 1872 (aged 44–45) at sea near Watling Island, Bahamas (now Bermuda)
- Occupations: Painter, educator
- Known for: Portrait paintings, landscape paintings
- Movement: Luminism
- Spouse: Ysabel "Elizabeth" Arzapalo (m. ?–1872; death)
- Children: 8

Fortunato Arriola (1827–1872) was a Mexican portraitist and landscape painter, of Spanish descent. He is considered one of the pioneer artists of California, and his work was popular in San Francisco, where he came to live in 1857. Arriola primarily painted portraits, sunsets, and luminous tropical landscapes.

== Early life and family ==
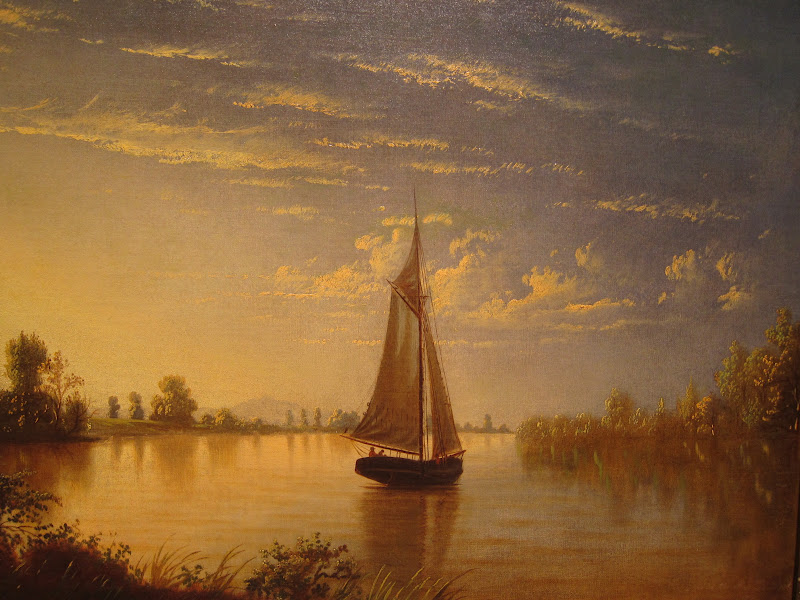
Sunset on the Sacramento River, 1869, Cantor Art Center, Stanford University

Fortunato Arriola was born in 1827, Cosalá, Sinaloa, Mexico. The son of a wealthy Spanish landowner. He was well versed in literature, and was a self-taught artist. He began his career painting portraits. Arriola admired the landscape paintings by Frederic Edwin Church.

== Career ==
His style was realistic, which he carried into his paintings of nature landscape scenes, for which he is most well-known. Contemporary critics especially praised Arriola’s paintings depicting moonlight and tropical scenes. He had a studio near the corner of Kearney and Clay Streets in San Francisco, that was a gathering place for Mexican exiles, a place of intellectual ferment, and the occasional brawl. Among his students were Toby Rosenthal and Ransom Holdredge. Many of his works were of imagined views of Central America, and disappeared after he died. His largest painting, "Sunset in the Tropics", measures about 5 ft. by 7 ft. in its original frame.

The artist exhibited his work at the Mechanics' Institute Fairs in 1864 and 1865, as well as the National Academy of Design in 1872. In 1872, he traveled to New York City to exhibit two paintings at the National Academy of Design.

== Death and legacy ==
He was returning from New York City to San Francisco on the commercial steamship Bienville (formerly USS Bienville), which was carrying a load of dynamite. It exploded on August 15, 1872 near Watling Island, Bahamas (now Bermuda). He is thought to have died at sea, leaving a widow and six children. San Francisco artists from the San Francisco Art Association participated in a group exhibition to raise money for the surviving family, the effort was led by artist Edwin Deakin. His daughter Herminia Arriola Gonzales (1857–1938), was also a noted painter.

His work, "Moonlit River Gorge" sold at Bonhams Los Angeles in 2014 for $27,500 USD. Arriola was covered in a podcast episode called "Fortunato Arriola - Wikicast 075" published in May 2020.

In 2017–2018, his work was part of the group exhibition "California Mexicana: Missions to Murals, 1820–1930," at the Laguna Art Museum, curated by Katherine Manthorne and Alberto Nulman Magidin.

== Paintings ==
His paintings include:

- Portrait of a young girl
- Portrait of a young woman
- View of the Golden Gate
- Moon over Nicaragua
- Twilight in the Tropics
- Luminous Sunset with Sailboats
- Evening Smoke by the Mosque
- Sunset in the Tropics
- Nancy Nellie Hall Bacon, Thomas Jefferson's niece, c. 1860s
- Howard Street by Night, c. 1860s
- Temple Emmanuel and the San Francisco Armory, c. 1860s
- Lost in the Arctic Ice, 1864
- Mariano Guadalupe Vallejo, 1864
- South American Landscapes, c. 1866
- Untitled (Tropical Landscape), 1866
- View Looking out the Golden Gate, 1868
- Sunset on the Sacramento River, 1869
- Santa Barbara Coast, 1870
- Tropical Landscape, 1870
- Moonlit River Gorge, 1870
- Twilight Along the Nile at Luxor, 1872

== Museum collections ==
Several additional paintings are in the private collection of actor Steve Martin.

- California Historical Society, Santa Clara, California
- Cantor Arts Center, Stanford University, Stanford, California
- Crocker Art Museum, Sacramento, California
- Oakland Museum of California, Oakland, California
- Courthouse Museum, Shasta State Historic Park, Shasta, California
- Solano County Historical Society, Vacaville, California
