= Toby Edward Rosenthal =

19th/20th-century American painter

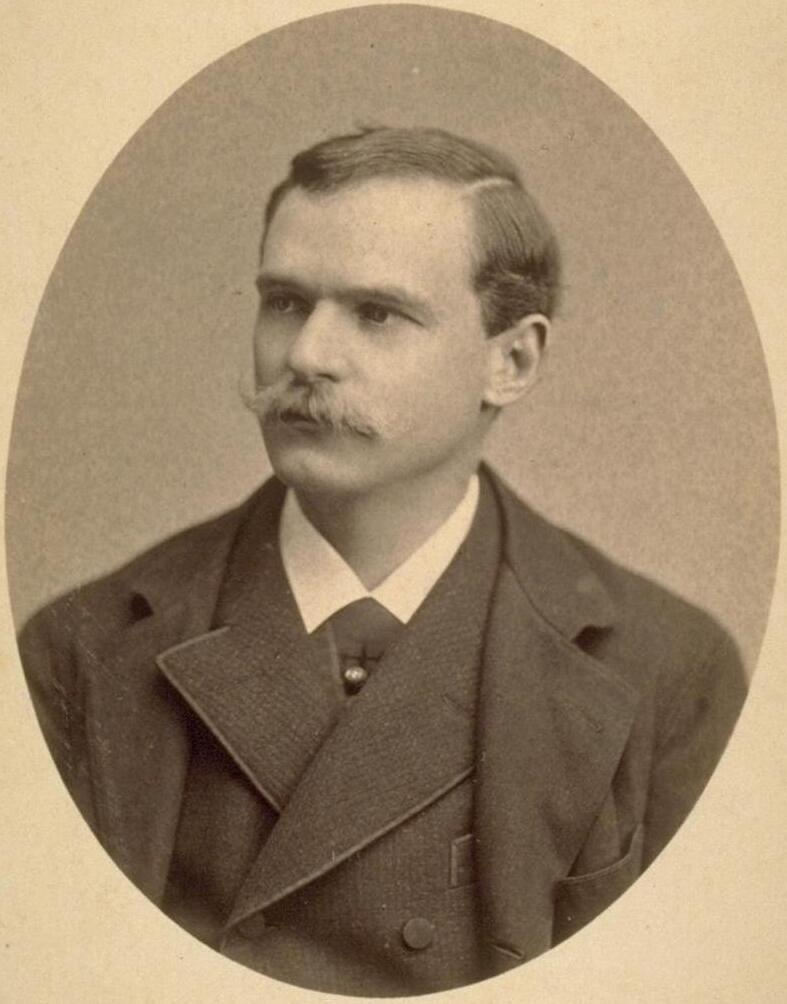
Toby Edward Rosenthal

Tobias Edward Rosenthal, known as Toby (15 March 1848 in Strasburg in Westpreußen, Prussia – 23 December 1917 in Munich) was a German-American genre and portrait painter. He generally claimed to have been born in New Haven, Connecticut.

== Biography ==
Shortly after he was born, his parents emigrated to the United States. They settled in San Francisco in 1858 and his father, Jakob, worked as a tailor. He had expressed a strong desire to be a painter, so they enrolled him at a drawing school operated by a French-born sculptor named Louis Bacon. There, he attracted the attention of the expatriate Mexican artist, Fortunato Arriola, who gave him free lessons.

In 1865, at Arriola's urging, his parents raised the money to send him to Munich, where he became a pupil at the Academy of Fine Arts. His instructors there included Alexander Strähuber and Karl Raupp. Later, he attended master classes taught by Karl Theodor von Piloty. His painting of Johann Sebastian Bach and his family at their morning prayers (1870) was awarded a medal and purchased by the State Museum in Leipzig.

During his stay there, his father had been publishing his letters in the local newspapers. When he returned home, in 1871, he found himself the center of attention, and received numerous commissions for portraits. Despite that, the constant socializing became monotonous, and he went back to Munich. There he painted The Beautiful Elaine (1874), based on a work by Alfred Tennyson, which had been commissioned by a banker in San Francisco. It proved to be a difficult painting, so Rosenthal requested more money for it, but was refused. He then sold it to someone else for several times the originally promised amount. His breach of contract created a small scandal.

In 1876, he participated in the Centennial Exposition in Philadelphia. He was awarded another medal in 1883 for Trial of the Escaped Nun Constance de Beverley, based on the poem Marmion by Sir Walter Scott, now held by the Los Angeles County Museum of Art.

Except for an occasional visit to his family, he spent the rest of his life in Germany and married a local banker's daughter, although he continued to accept commissions from America. He died in 1917, at the age of sixty-nine, and was interred in the Nordfriedhof.

His works are in the collections of the Leipzig Museum, the Art Institute of Chicago, the Los Angeles County Museum of Art, the De Young Museum in San Francisco, and the Magnes Collection of Jewish Art and Life in Berkeley.

== Selected paintings ==
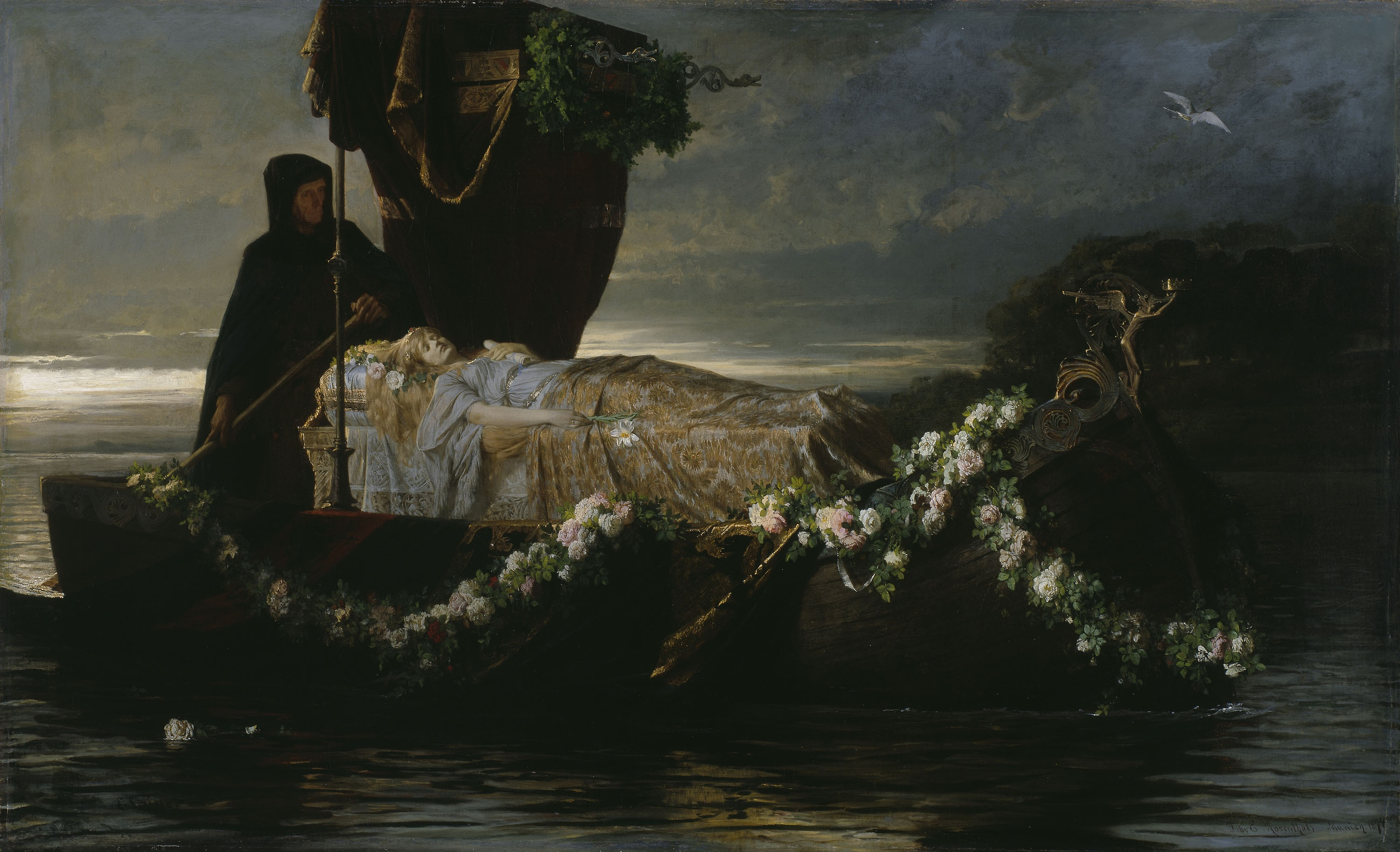
The Beautiful Elaine, 1874, Art Institute of Chicago

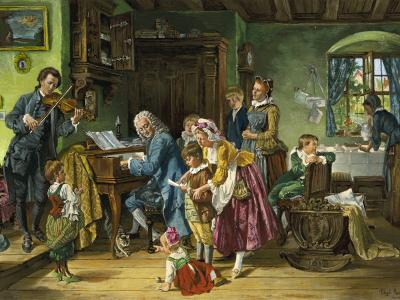
J. S. Bach and His Family at Morning Prayers, 1870, Leipzig Museum

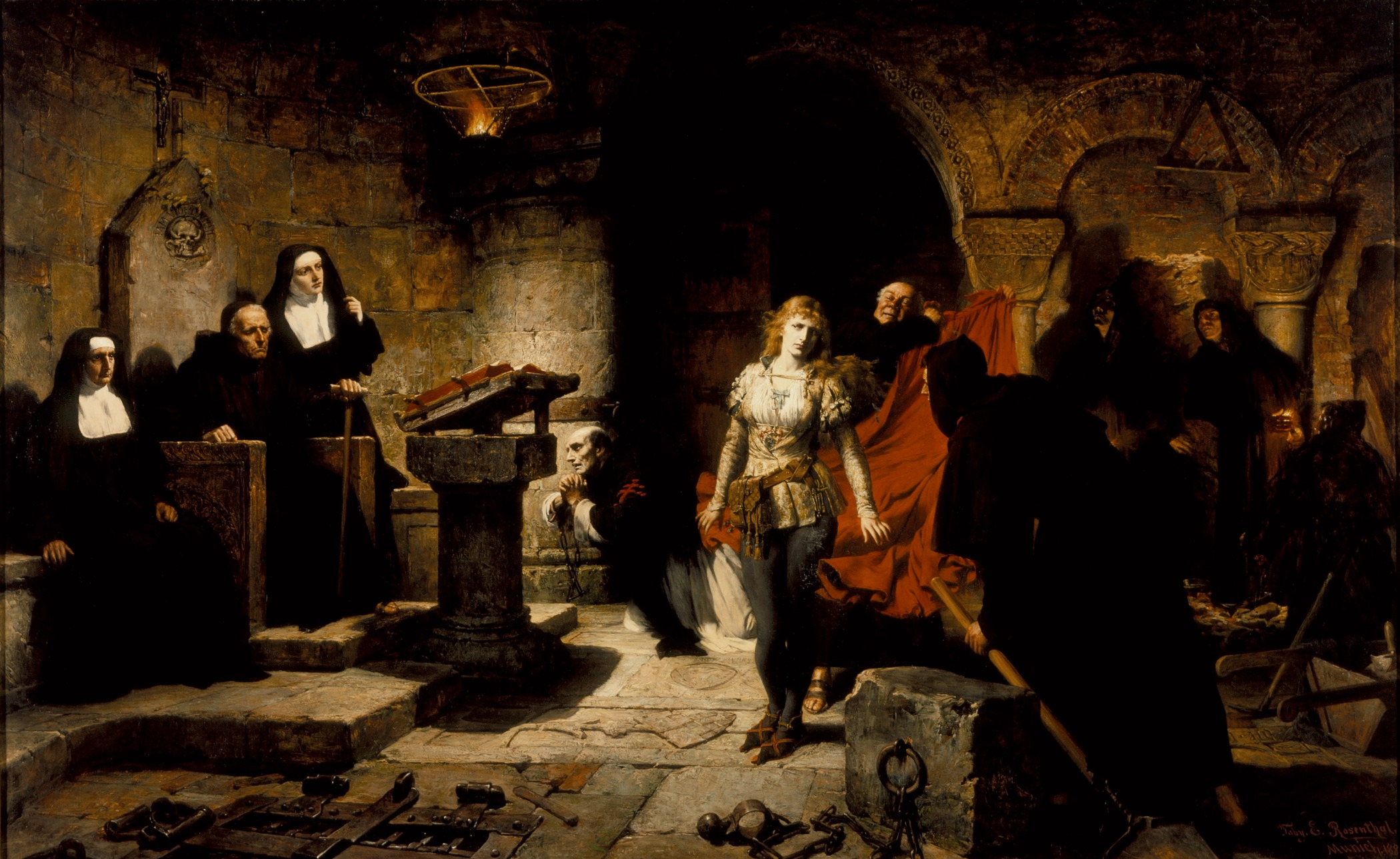
The Trial of the Escaped Nun Constance de Beverley, 1883, LACMA

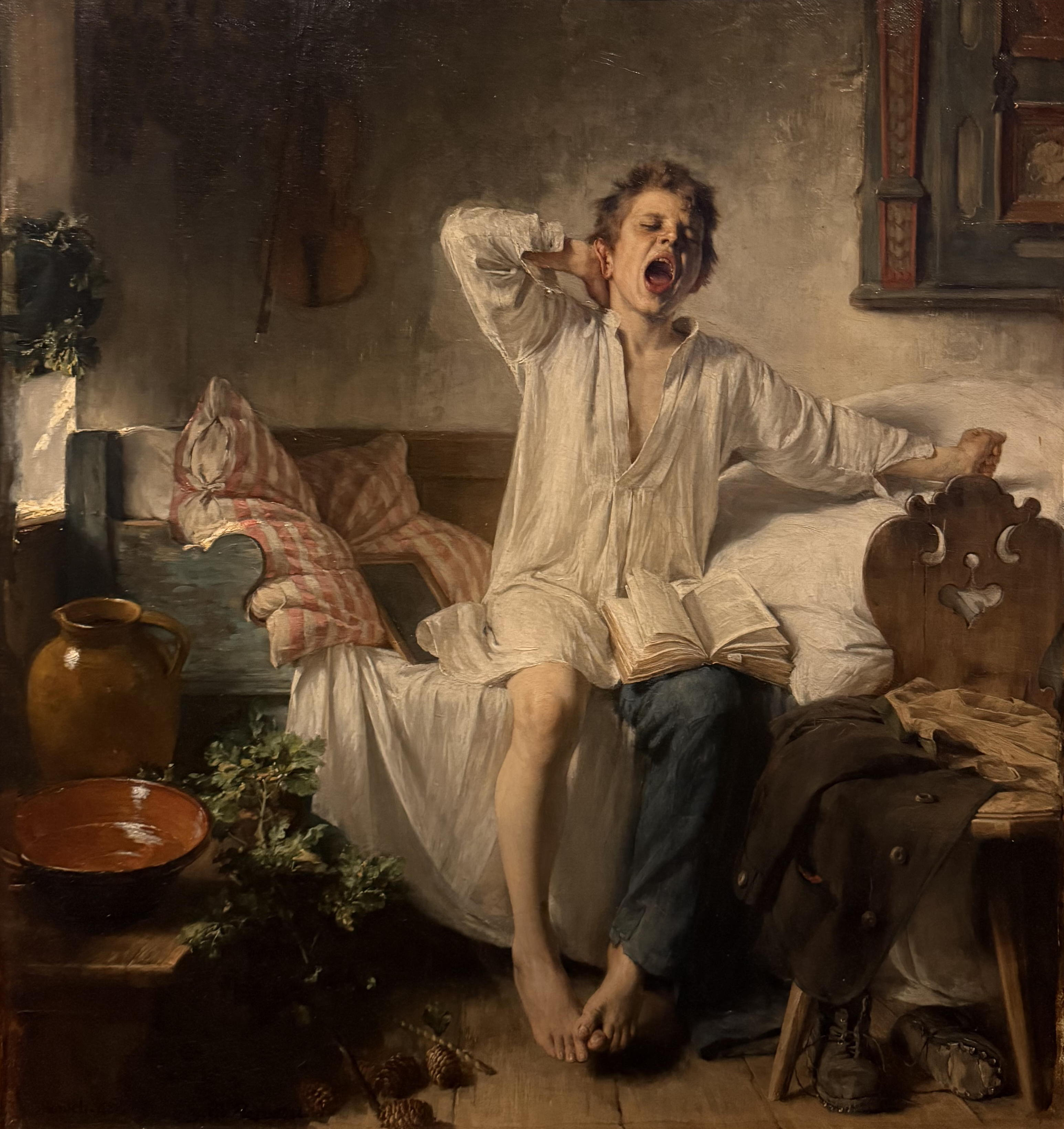
Boy Awakening, 1888, Magnes Collection of Jewish Art and Life

== Other notable works ==
- "Love's Last Offering"
- "Spring's Joy and Sorrow" (1868)
- "Young Monk in Refectory" (1875)
- "Forbidden Longings"
- "Who laughs last, laughs best," a humorous genre diptych
- "Girls' Boarding-School Alarmed" (1877)
- "A Mother's Prayer" (1881)
- "Empty Place" (1882)
- "Dancing Lesson During the Empire"
- "Departure from the Family"
- "Out of the Frying-Pan into the Fire," one of his most popular of his works, frequently engraved (1871)

== Writings ==
- Toby E. Rosenthal, Erinnerungen eines Malers (Memoirs of a painter), Munich: Richard Pflaum, 1927.
