= CSS Lapwing =

History

Confederate States
- Name: Lapwing
- Namesake: Lapwing
- Operator: Confederate States Navy
- Captured: By confederate forces.
- Fate: Burned to prevent capture.

General characteristics
- Propulsion: sails
- Complement: two officers and 18 men.
- Armament: two howitzers.

CSS Lapwing was a barque of the Confederate States of America of the American Civil War.

== Capture and history ==
Lapwing sailed from Boston, Mass., en route to Batavia, Java, with a cargo of coal, tobacco, and provisions when she was captured by CSS Florida on 28 March 1863. Lt. J. N. Maffitt, CSN, commanding Florida, transferred two howitzers, two officers, and 18 men to the prize and placed Lt. S. W. Averett, CSN, in command with orders to meet him in longitude 30- W. on the Equator or at the island of Fernando de Noronha. At that time Averett was addressed as commanding officer of the C.S. tender Oreto but thereafter this ship was referred to as Lapwing.

Florida fell in with Lapwing off the coast of Brazil on 14 April and again on 3 May. Lieutenant Averett reported the capture on 20 April of the American ship Kate Dyer bonded by him because she bore a neutral cargo. His ship was leaking so badly at the time that she was unfit for cruising; consequently her armament was returned to Florida. Averett was replaced by Acting Master R. S. Floyd, CSN, who was directed to anchor under the Rocas, 80 miles west of Fernando de Noronha where Florida would coal. Floyd waited the stipulated 30 days, but faced with a shortage of provisions, burned his ship on 20 June 1863. He and his men went ashore in the ship's boats and reported to the Confederate agent at Barbados Island.
