= USS Bienville =

Gunboat of the United States Navy

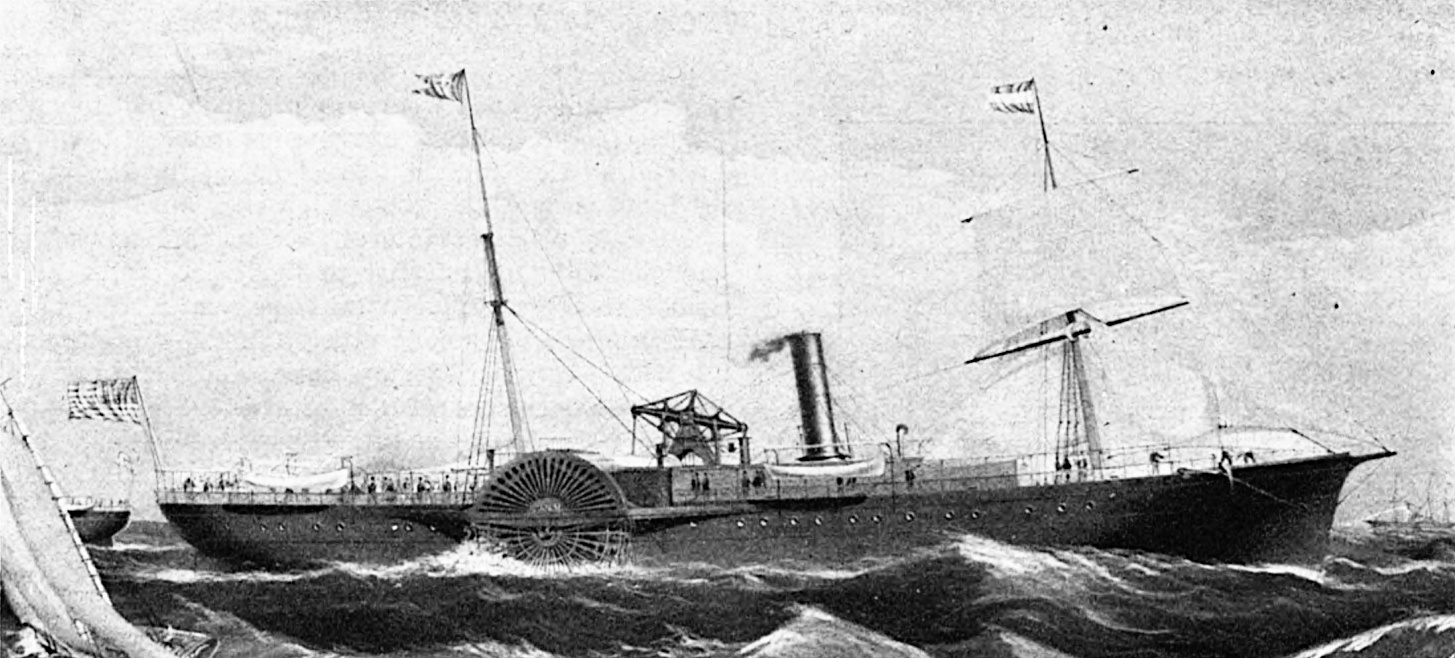
- Bienville in merchant service

History

United States
- Name: USS Bienville
- Namesake: Jean Baptiste de Bienville
- Builder: Lawrence & Foulks (Williamsburg, NY)
- Launched: 1860
- Acquired: August 14, 1861
- Commissioned: October 23, 1861
- Decommissioned: Soon after war's end
- Stricken: 1867 (est.)
- Fate: Destroyed by fire, Watling Island, Bahamas, 15 August 1872

General characteristics
- Type: Sidewheel steamship
- Displacement: 1,558 long tons (1,583 t)
- Length: 253 ft (77 m)
- Beam: 38 ft (12 m)
- Draft: 16 ft 2 in (4.93 m)
- Installed power: Walking beam
- Propulsion: Sidewheels; auxiliary sails
- Speed: 15 kn (28 km/h)
- Complement: 185
- Armament: 1 × 30-pounder rifle, 8 × 32-pounder smoothbore guns

USS Bienville was a 1,558 long tons (1,583 t) (burden) wooden side-wheel paddle steamer acquired by the Union Navy early in the American Civil War. She was armed with heavy guns and assigned to the Union blockade of the waterways of the Confederate States of America.

== Built in Brooklyn, New York ==
Bienville built at Brooklyn, New York in 1860. She was a two-masted sail-steamer, with a walking beam steam engine driving a pair of side paddle wheels. The Union Navy bought her in August 1861 as part of the great expansion that took place in the first months of the American Civil War.

== Civil War operations ==
=== Assigned to the South Atlantic blockade ===
She was commissioned on 23 October 1861 with Commander Charles Steedman in command and soon took part in the expedition that seized future Naval bases at Port Royal and Beaufort, South Carolina. Bienville operated off the Confederacy's Atlantic coast for more than a year, taking part in the capture of positions along the Georgia and Florida shore as well as ending the careers of several blockade runners, among them the steamships Stettin (later USS Stettin) (taken on May 24, 1862) and Patras (May 27, 1862).

=== Gulf of Mexico operations ===
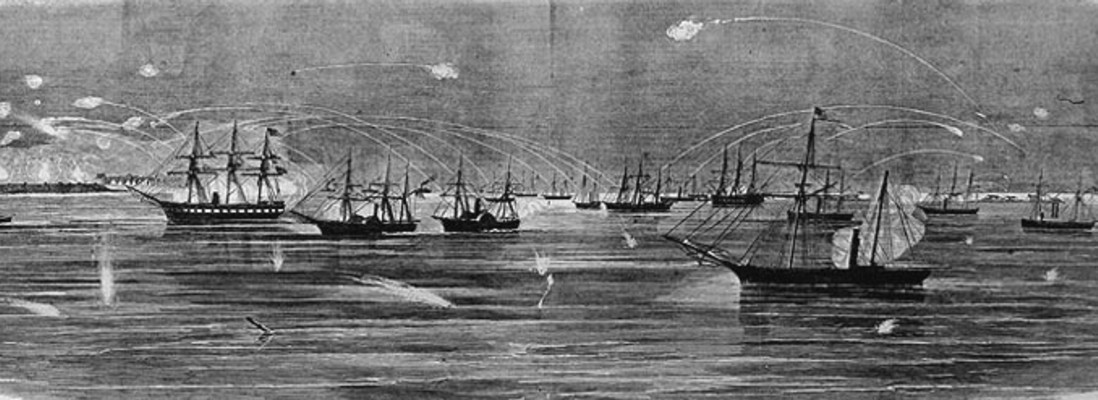
Bombardment and Capture of Port Royal, South Carolina, November 7, 1861

In 1863 USS Bienville was transferred to the Gulf of Mexico, where she continued her blockading work. She supported the capture of the entrances to Mobile Bay, Alabama on August 5, 1864. The USS Princess Royal and Bienville were stationed off the coast of Texas blockading Galveston. On the night of February 7, 1865, the two gunboats sent a boat party into Galveston Bay, Texas to seize two schooners loaded with cotton. The actual prize sought was the destruction of Wren, a ship built by Laird, Son & Co. of Birkenhead (no. 317), along with sister ship (no. 318) the Lark, for Fraser, Trenholm and Company. The Wren had run aground February 6, 1865, but was freed, narrowly escaping capture, and moored inside Galveston Harbor. The schooners Pet, with 256 bales of cotton on board, and Annie Sophia, with 220 bales, were anchored near the main channel at Fort Point. Acting Ensign George French was dispatched with twenty seamen and three officers to destroy the Wren and capture the schooners. Successful in capturing the schooners, they were not able to get to the Wren.

== Decommissioning and civilian career ==
Bienville was decommissioned soon after the end of the Civil War. After about two years in reserve, she was sold in October 1867. She operated under the same name as a commercial steamship until August 15, 1872, when a fire destroyed her at Watling Island, Bahamas. Mexican-born Spanish artist Fortunato Arriola was aboard the ship during the fire, and was lost at sea.
