= CSS Archer =

Fishing schooner captured during the American Civil War

History

Confederate States
- Name: Archer
- Captured: June 25, 1863 by the CSS Tacony and converted to CSN service; June 28, 1863 by the steamer Forest City
- Fate: Unknown

General characteristics
- Complement: 4 officers, 17 men
- Armament: 1 6-pounder boat howitzer

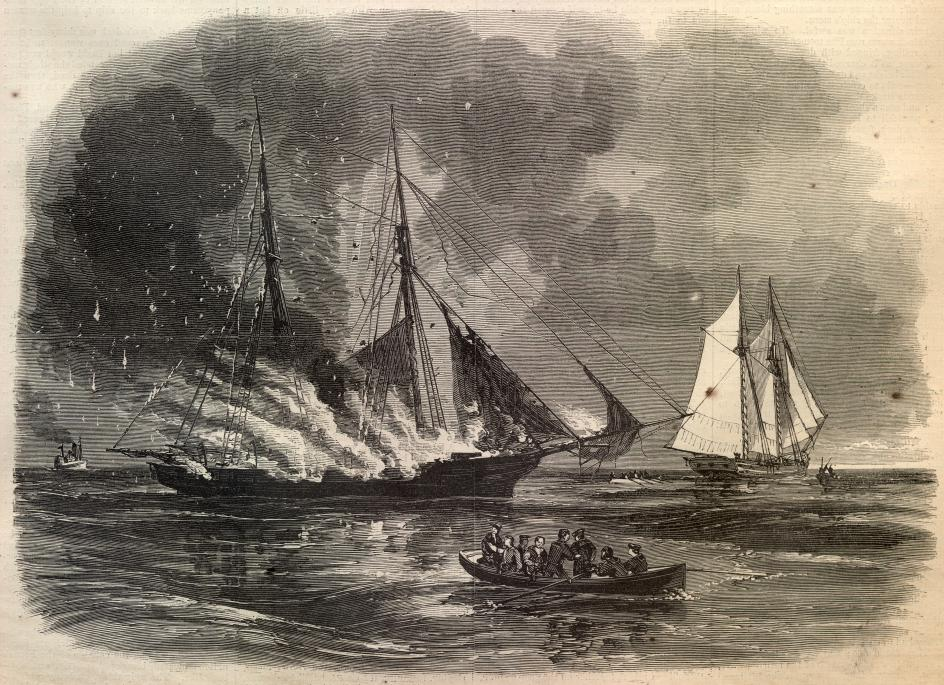
Revenue cutter Caleb Cushing torched. The Caleb Cushing was a ship captured by the CSS Archer.

CSS Archer was originally a fishing schooner captured by the Confederate cruiser CSS Tacony during the American Civil War and converted into a Confederate cruiser for commerce raiding.

The CSS Tacony, commanded by Lt. Charles W. Read, captured the Archer on June 25, 1863 off the coast of Portland, Maine. Knowing that the Union was on a hunt for his ship, he transferred the crew and armaments to it and destroyed the Tacony.

Read decided to try to capture the revenue cutter Caleb Cushing on his way down the coast of New England. On June 27, 1863, the Archer sailed into the harbor of Portland, Maine and docked, disguising itself as a schooner. At night, the Cushing was boarded and the crew placed below decks. The Archer and the Caleb Cushing then sailed out of the harbor in the dawn. When the disappearance of the Cushing was noticed, ships were sent in pursuit, and due to the failing wind, were able to catch up and capture the Archer, but not before Read had set the magazine on board the Cushing on fire, which resulted in the Cushing's destruction.

== Officers and crew ==
- Lt. Charles W. Read, commander
- Billups, Matthewson, and Pride, master's mates
- Brown, engineer
- 16 men

== See also ==
- Ships captured in the American Civil War
- Bibliography of American Civil War naval history
- Union Navy
- Confederate States Navy

== Notes and references ==
- Scharf, J. Thomas (1887). History of the Confederate States Navy. New York: Rogers & Sherwood.
