= USS Paul Jones (1862) =

Gunboat of the United States Navy

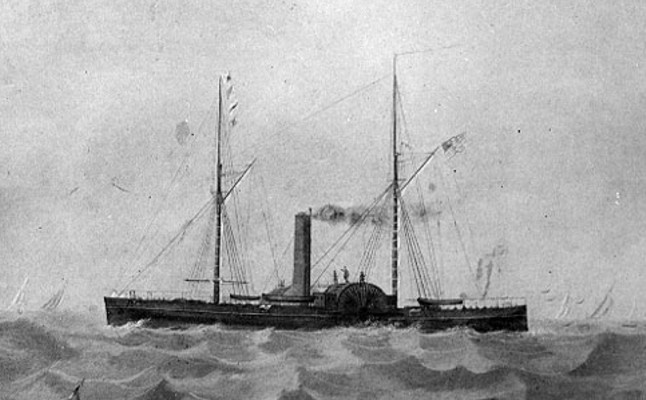
- USS Paul Jones painting by W.R. May.

History

United States
- Name: USS Paul Jones
- Namesake: John Paul Jones
- Builder: J. J. Abrahams, Baltimore, Maryland
- Laid down: unknown date
- Launched: 30 January 1862
- Commissioned: 9 June 1862 at Baltimore, Maryland
- Decommissioned: 13 July 1867 at New York City
- Stricken: 13 July 1867
- Fate: Sold, 13 July 1867 at New York City

General characteristics
- Class & type: Paul Jones
- Displacement: 1,210 tons
- Length: 216 ft 10 in (66.09 m)
- Beam: 35 ft 4 in (10.77 m)
- Draft: 8 ft (2.4 m)
- Depth of hold: 11 ft 6 in (3.51 m)
- Propulsion: steam engine, side wheel-propelled
- Speed: 10 knots
- Complement: not known
- Armament: one 100-pounder gun; two 11" guns; two 50-pounder guns; two 24-pounder guns
- Notes: Ship was double ended.

USS Paul Jones was a large 1,210-ton sidewheel, double-ended, steam gunboat of the Union Navy that served during the American Civil War. She carried heavy guns and was assigned to the Union blockade of the waterways of the Confederate States of America.

During her tour of duty, she captured blockade runners and bombarded Confederate shore installations. Post-war, she served in the Gulf of Mexico for two years before being decommissioned.

== Commissioned at Baltimore, Maryland ==
Paul Jones – the first U.S. Navy ship to carry that name—was launched 30 January 1862 by J. J. Abrahams, Baltimore, Maryland, and commissioned 9 June 1862 at Baltimore, Maryland, Commander Charles Steedman in command.

== Civil War service ==
=== Assigned to the South Atlantic blockade ===
Joining the South Atlantic Blockading Squadron, Paul Jones sailed down the coast to engage the fort at Jones Point, Ogeechee River, Georgia, 29 July. Continuing south, she helped to silence the fort on St. John's Bluff, St. John's River, Florida, on 17 September, in company with USS Patroon and USS Cimarron.

While patrolling on blockade duty, she assisted in capturing schooner Major E. Willis 19 April 1863 off Charleston, South Carolina, and successfully took sloop Mary, loaded with cotton, off St. Simons Sound, Georgia on 8 July.

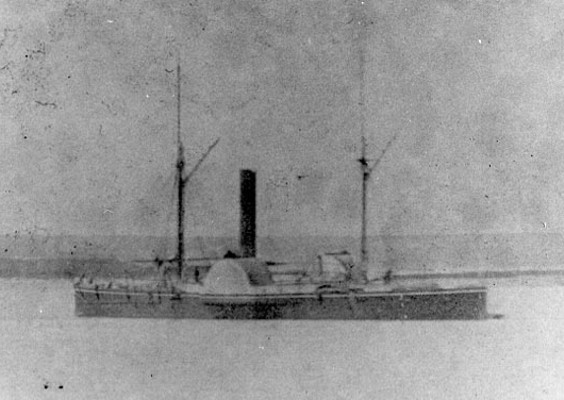
Photo of the USS Paul Jones, possibly at the end of the war.

=== Attack on Fort Wagner ===
Paul Jones participated in attacks on Fort Wagner in Charleston Harbor, (18 July – 24 July) and returned to New York City for repairs until she rejoined her squadron 15 September. She continued her coastal operations until late August 1864 when she sailed to Boston, Massachusetts and decommissioned 19 September.

== Post-war service and disposition ==
Paul Jones recommissioned at the Boston Navy Yard 1 April 1865 for further service in the Gulf of Mexico. On 31 March 1866 she was stationed at Mobile, Alabama, and in July 1867 she returned to New York City, decommissioned, and was sold on the 13th.
