= Charles Read (naval officer) =

American naval officer

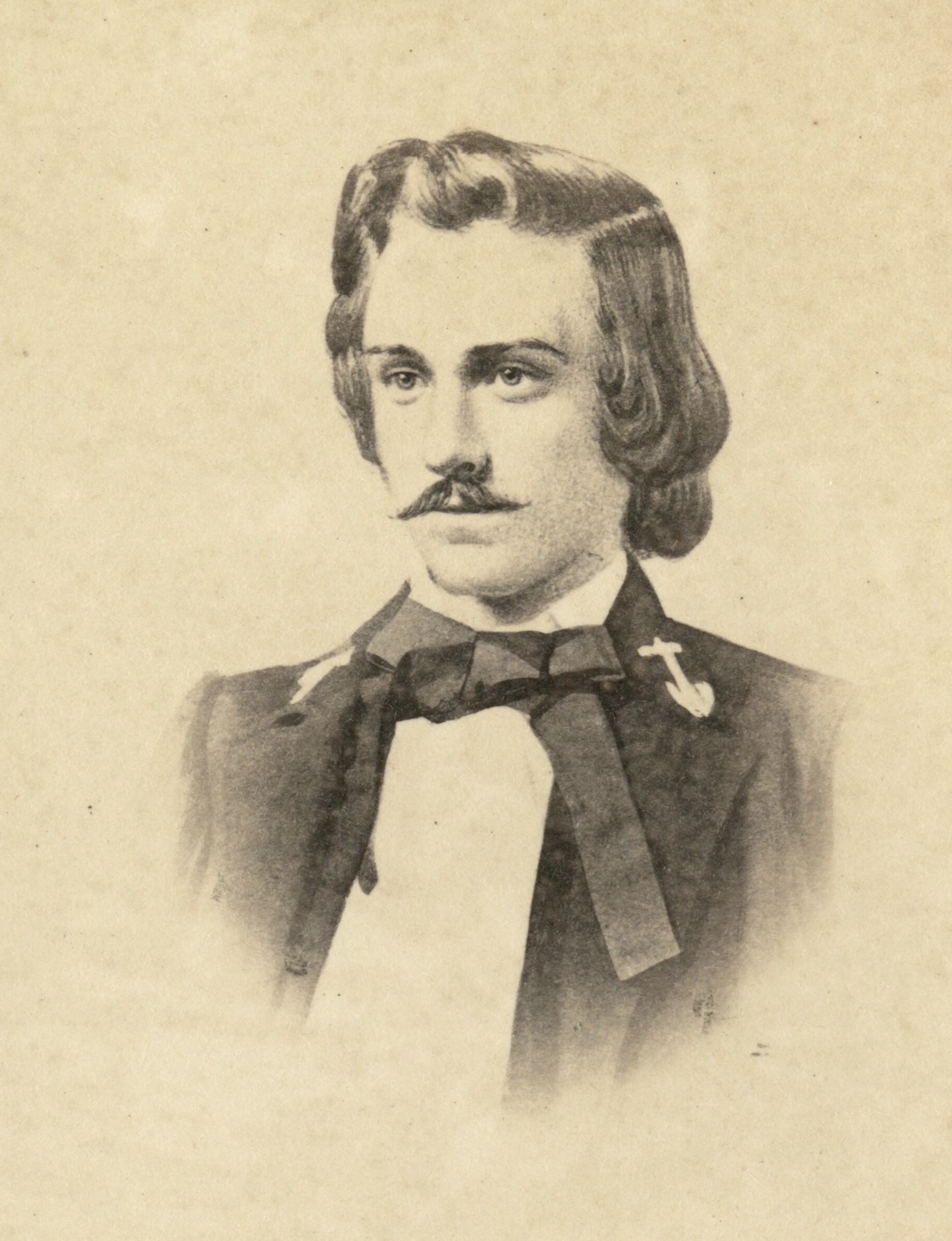
- Read in uniform, c. 1860
- Born: Charles William Read; May 12, 1840; Satartia, Mississippi, U.S.
- Died: January 25, 1890 (aged 49); Meridian, Mississippi, U.S.
- Burial place: Rose Hill Cemetery, Meridian, Mississippi, U.S.
- Military career
- Allegiance: United States; Confederate States of America; United States of Colombia; Peru
- Branch: United States Navy; Confederate States Navy; Colombian Navy; Peruvian Navy
- Service years: 1860–1861 (U.S.); 1861–1865 (C.S.)
- Rank: Midshipman (U.S.); Lieutenant (C.S.); Commander (Peru)
- Nickname: "Savez"
- Commands: CSS McRae; CSS Arkansas; CSS Florida; CSS Clarence; CSS Tacony; CSS Archer; CSS Scorpion; CSS Webb
- Battles: American Civil War; Battle of Ship Island; Battle of the Head of Passes; Battle of Baton Rouge; Battle of Portland Harbor; Battle of Trent's Reach; War of the Pacific

Charles William Read (May 12, 1840 – January 25, 1890), known commonly as "Savez", was an officer in the antebellum United States Navy and then in the Confederate Navy during the American Civil War. He was nicknamed the "Seawolf of the Confederacy" for his exploits and daring.

== Early life and career ==
Charles William Read was born in Satartia, Mississippi in 1840. He was appointed to the United States Naval Academy in 1856 and graduated in 1860. He served briefly aboard USS Powhatan after graduation.

== American Civil War ==
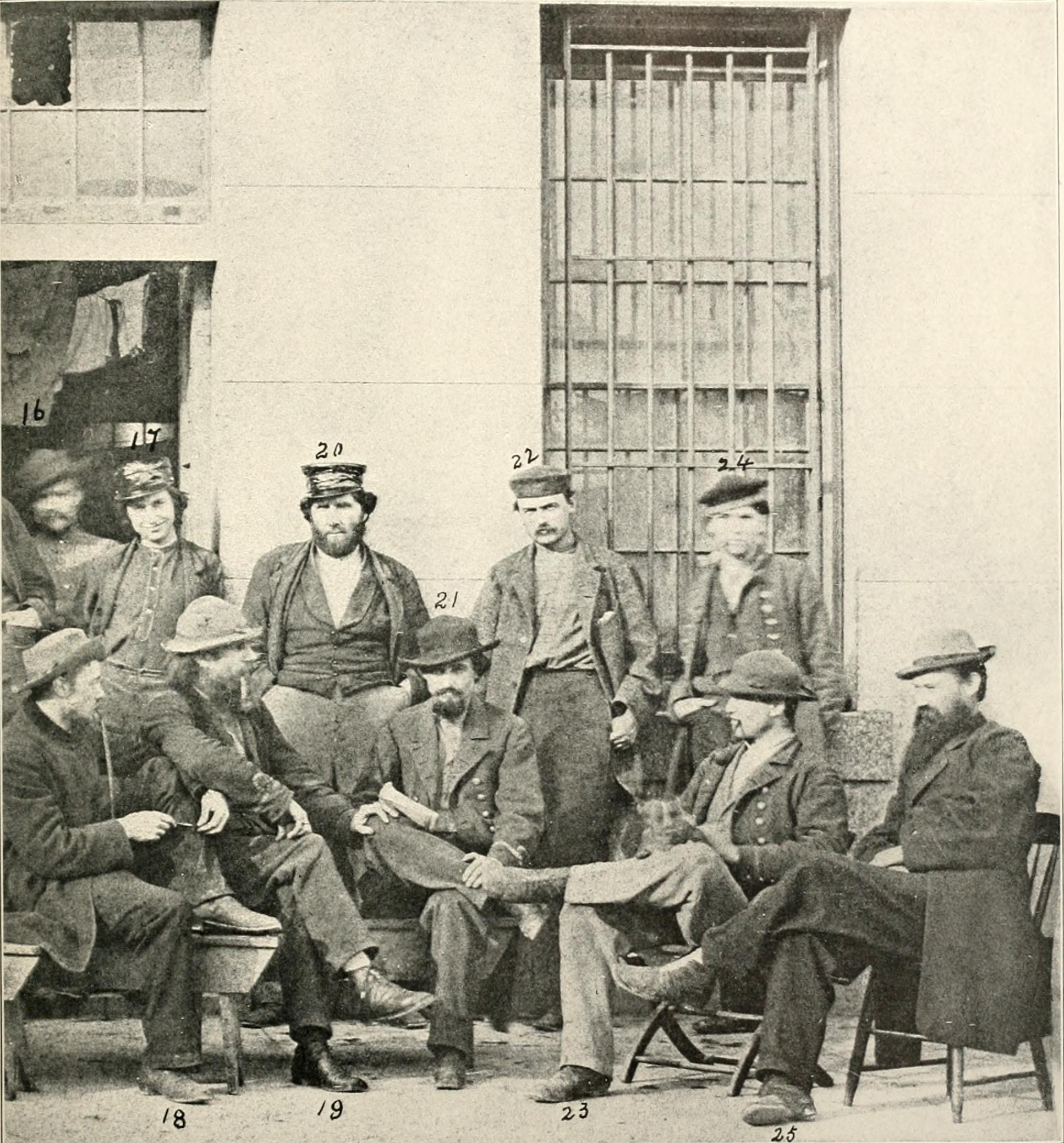
Read (seated, center) with fellow prisoners at Fort Warren

At the outbreak of the American Civil War Read resigned his commission with the United States Navy and accepted a position with the Confederate States Navy. Read was initially assigned to the CSS McRae at New Orleans, Louisiana as a midshipman and participated in the battle between batteries on Ship Island and the USS Massachusetts on July 9, 1861. On October 12, 1861, he participated in the attack on the Union blockading squadron at Head of the Passes on the Mississippi River. When the commander of the CSS McRae was wounded on April 24, 1862, Read took command of the ship.

Read then served as executive officer of the CSS Arkansas during its actions against a blockading fleet of over 30 ships on the Mississippi River near Vicksburg, Mississippi on 13 July 1862. Read served as acting commander of the Arkansas during her final battle supporting the Confederate Army assaulting Baton Rouge, Louisiana on 6 August 1862. After the sinking of the Arkansas, Read travelled by foot to Port Hudson, Louisiana and assisted with the emplacement of shore guns there.

Read was soon ordered to Mobile, Alabama and was assigned to the CSS Florida which set sail on 15 January 1863. He transferred to the CSS Clarence, a captured prize of the Florida, and set out on his own. During this raiding mission, which lasted from 6 June 1863 to 27 June 1863, Read transferred his command to prize vessels twice more, once to the CSS Tacony and finally to the CSS Archer.

At the end of the raid, Lieutenant Read had captured or destroyed twenty-two United States vessels. He and his crew were captured off Portland, Maine on June 27, 1863, while attempting to take the USRC Caleb Cushing. Read was held at Fort Warren, Massachusetts, until he was exchanged at Cox Wharf, Virginia, on October 18, 1864.

After his release, Read participated in naval and land operations on the James River, he commanded the CSS Scorpion and two other torpedo boats at the Battle of Trent's Reach. In January 1865, he was assigned to the CSS Webb at Shreveport, Louisiana with the intention that she become a raider in the Pacific Ocean. Read did not reach the Webb until 22 April 1865. Read attempted to break out to the Gulf of Mexico but grounded in shallow waters near New Orleans on April 23, 1865. Read fired the ship to prevent its capture by Federal forces. Read surrendered to Federal naval authorities in New Orleans and was transported again to Fort Warren. He was released on July 24, 1865.

== Later life ==
In 1867, Read was second officer aboard a ship involved in an effort to help Cuban rebels overthrow the Spanish government of the island. Read and others were arrested by the US government but were quickly released.

He was later hired by Charles Flynt to train Peru in the use of torpedoes. Read was commissioned as a Commander in the Peruvian Navy and much like John Randolph Tucker, received disdain from within the Peruvian Navy due to their jealousy of a foreigner being hired in a position of command.

Read earned his nickname "Savvy" or "Savez" due to his constant use of the term.

Charles Read died on January 25, 1890, in Meridian, Mississippi, and was interred at Rose Hill Cemetery.

== See also ==
- Commerce raiding
