= Battle of Portland Harbor =

Battle of the American Civil War

Coordinates: 43.663153°N 70.221004°W

- Part of the American Civil War
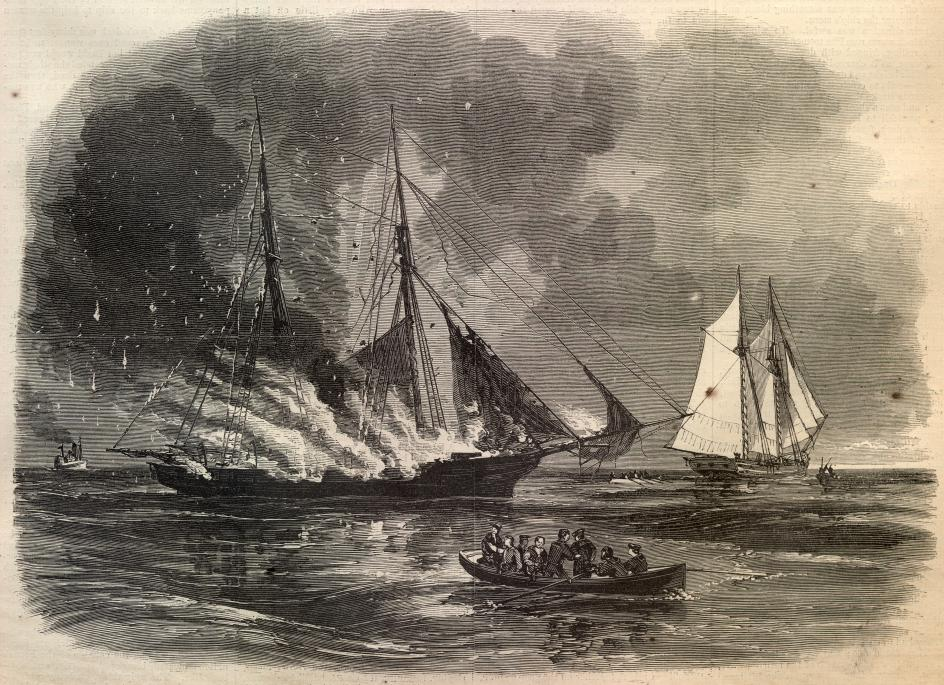
- Harper's Weekly illustration of USRC Caleb Cushing burning during the Battle of Portland Harbor.
Date	June 27, 1863
Location	off Portland, Maine
Result	United States victory

Belligerents
United States (Union)	(Confederate States of America) CSA (Confederacy)

Commanders and leaders
Jacob McLellan	(Confederate States of America) Charles Read

Units involved
USRC Caleb Cushing	

Strength
1 cutter 2 steamers	1 schooner

Casualties and losses
1 cutter scuttled 2 steamers damaged	25 captured 1 schooner captured
- The Union revenue cutter USRC Caleb Cushing was captured and scuttled by the Confederates during the battle.

The Battle of Portland Harbor was an incident during the American Civil War, in June 1863, in the waters off Portland, Maine. Two civilian ships engaged two vessels under Confederate States Navy employment.

== Background ==
Around June 24, a Confederate raider named the Tacony, commanded by Lieutenant Charles Read, CSN, was being pursued by the Union Navy. To thwart their pursuers, at about 2 AM on June 25, the Confederates captured the Archer, a Maine fishing schooner out of Southport, and used it to sneak into Portland Harbor. After transferring their supplies and cargo onto Archer, the Confederates set fire to Tacony, hoping the Union Navy would believe the ship was destroyed.

On June 26, a Confederate raiding party entered the harbor at Portland late in the evening, sailing past Portland Head Light. The rebels disguised themselves as fishermen; they planned to try to destroy the area's commercial shipping capability, and then to escape out of the harbor.

== Battle ==
When the raiders left the port area on June 27, they proceeded to the federal wharf. Having the advantage of surprise, the crew seized a cutter belonging to the Revenue Service, the USRC Caleb Cushing (named for a Massachusetts congressman, United States Attorney General and Minister to Spain). Their original intent was to seize the side wheel steamer Chesapeake, but its boilers were cold. As they would lose too much time in getting the steam up, they took Cushing. They escaped and sailed out to sea.

News spread of the Confederate actions and the Army garrison at Fort Preble in nearby South Portland was alerted to the rebel intrusion. The Confederates had been observed by several persons while taking over the cutter, and public fury was aroused. Thirty soldiers from Fort Preble were assigned to pursue the raiders; they took a six-pound field piece and a 12-pound howitzer. Accompanied by about 100 civilian volunteers, the soldiers commandeered the steamer Forest City, a side-wheel excursion ship, and the Chesapeake, whose steam was finally up. All of the civilians on board were issued muskets to defend against the Confederates.

Forest City, the faster ship, was the first to catch up to Cushing and Archer. Cushing opened fire on Forest City when it had come within the 2 mi (3.2 km) range. The captain of Forest City was afraid to pursue any further. Cushing, being a revenue cutter, had two secret compartments hidden in the captain's stateroom. Confederate Lieutenant Read had not discovered the cache of powder and ammunition stored there. If he had, the outcome could have been very different.

Chesapeake, which had left port sometime after Forest City with Portland's Mayor Jacob McLellan in command, finally caught up and continued on toward Cushing. The wind was beginning to blow against the Confederate sailors and the steamers soon caught sight of Cushing. Read, the Confederate lieutenant, ordered Cushing torched; its munitions exploded after the ship was abandoned by her twenty-four crewmen, who escaped in lifeboats. They surrendered to Mayor McLellan and were held as prisoners of war at Fort Preble. Archer was also soon captured, and all the rebels were returned to Portland.

== Aftermath ==
Lieutenant Read was returned to Fort Warren but was exchanged in 1864 whereupon he resumed his duties in the Confederate States Navy. He was captured in April 1865 when the ship he commanded was captured attempting to run the blockade of New Orleans and was returned to Fort Warren. With the conclusion of the war, he was released in July 1865.

It was discovered that the Southern raiders were in possession of over $100,000 in Confederate bonds. These were to be paid after a treaty for peace was ratified between the North and the South.

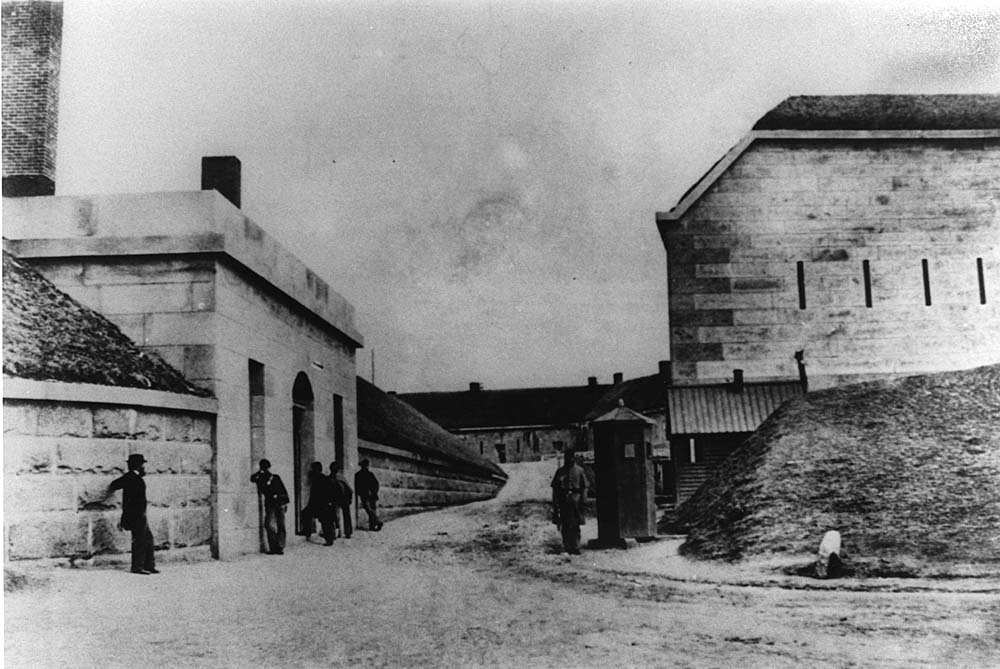
Fort Warren in 1861.

Public anger against the Southerners was high, and the city requested additional troops to safeguard the prisoners. When they were to be transported to Boston in July, the men had to be removed from Portland during the night to prevent a riot from breaking out, eventually being relocated to Boston Harbor, and held at Fort Warren.

== Sources ==
- Morison, Samuel Eliot (1965). "Troubled Waters". The Oxford History of the American People. Oxford: Oxford University Press. p. 664. ISBN 978-0-1950003-0-6.
- Maine Bureau of Corporations, Elections, and Commissions
- Harper's Weekly, 11 July 1863
- Confederate Navy Research Center, Mobile, Alabama
- The New York Times, 28 June 1863.
- Smith, Mason Philip (1985). Confederates Downeast: Confederate operations in and around Maine. Provincial Press. ISBN 978-0-9316750-9-6.
