= USS Stettin =

Gunboat of the United States Navy

History
- Acquired: 4 September 1862
- Decommissioned: 6 April 1865
- Stricken: c. 1866
- Captured: by Union Navy forces; 24 May 1862
- Fate: Stranded 24 September 1866

General characteristics
- Displacement: 600 tons
- Length: 164 ft (50 m)
- Beam: 28 ft (8.5 m)
- Draught: 12 ft (3.7 m)
- Propulsion: Steam engine; screw-propelled
- Complement: 72
- Armament: one 30-pounder Parrott rifle; four 24-pounder howitzers
- Armor: iron hull

USS Stettin was a 600-ton iron screw steamship, built at Sunderland, England, in 1861 and later served as a gunboat in the United States Navy during the American Civil War.

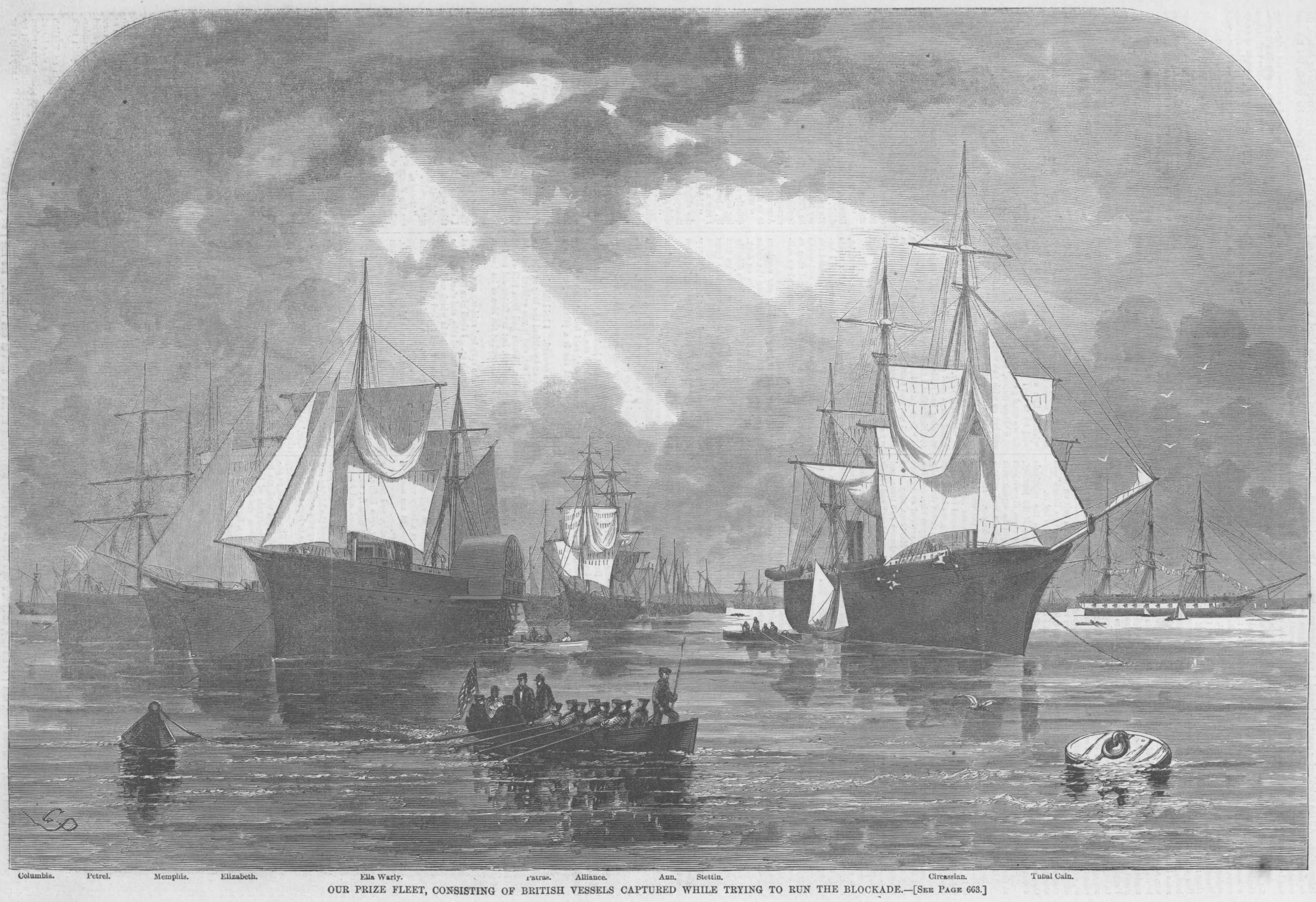
Blockade runners captured by the Union Navy, the Stettin is one of them.

== Capture of the English steamship Stettin ==
The Stettin was captured by the Union side wheel steamer USS Bienville on 24 May 1862 northeast of Charleston Bar while attempting to break through the Federal blockade of Charleston, South Carolina. The blockade runner had been attempting to slip into Charleston with saltpeter, lead, quinine, and assorted cargo from the Bahamas. Condemned by the New York Prize Court, the steamer was purchased by the United States Navy on 4 September, and placed in commission as USS Stettin in November. Acting Master Edward F. Devens was in command.

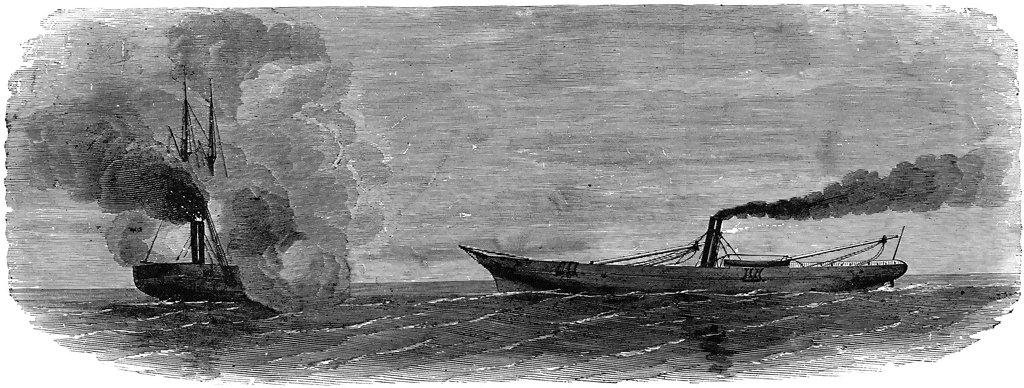
USS Stettin chases the Aries.

== Union blockade enforcement ==
Assigned to the South Atlantic Blockading Squadron, Stettin arrived at Port Royal, South Carolina, on 24 November 1862, and was sent back to the waters off Charleston to help enforce the blockade. While so assigned, she captured, or had a role in capturing or destroying, four would be blockade runners. On 28 March 1863, she captured Memphis, and Ottawa shelled steamer Havelock as the blockade runner raced past them off Charleston on 11 June. Their guns damaged Havelock so severely that she ran aground on Folly Island where she was seen at daybreak ablaze. She was later reported to be a total wreck. The Stettin operated successfully against the steamer Diamond on 23 September 1863 to achieve a fourth victory.

== Decommissioning ==
USS Stettin left the war zone late in the conflict and was decommissioned at the Boston Navy Yard on 6 April 1865. She was sold at a public auction on 22 June to Richard Baker Jr, and renamed Sheridan. She was stranded on 24 September 1866.

== See also ==
- Blockade runners of the American Civil War
- Blockade mail of the Confederacy
