= CSS Florida (cruiser) =

Confederate States Navy ship

Coordinates: 37.0732°N 76.5431°W

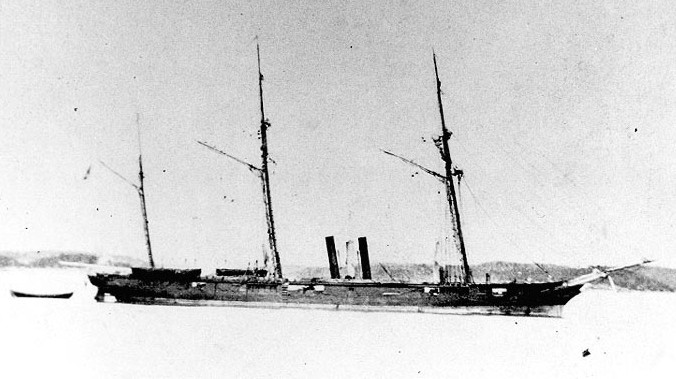
- CSS Florida

History

Confederate States
- Name: CSS Florida
- Builder: William C. Miller & Sons, Liverpool
- Launched: December 1861
- Commissioned: August 17, 1862
- Decommissioned: October 7, 1864
- Fate: Captured by US Navy; sunk in collision November 28, 1864

General characteristics
- Length: 191 ft 0 in (58.2 m)
- Beam: 27 ft 2 in (8.3 m)
- Draft: 13 ft 0 in (4.0 m)
- Propulsion: Sails and steam engine
- Speed: 9.5 knots (17.6 km/h; 10.9 mph) under steam; 12 knots (22 km/h; 14 mph) under sail
- Complement: 146
- Armament: 6 × 6 in (152 mm) rifled cannon; 2 × 7 in (180 mm) rifled cannon; 1 × 12-pounder (5.4 kg) cannon

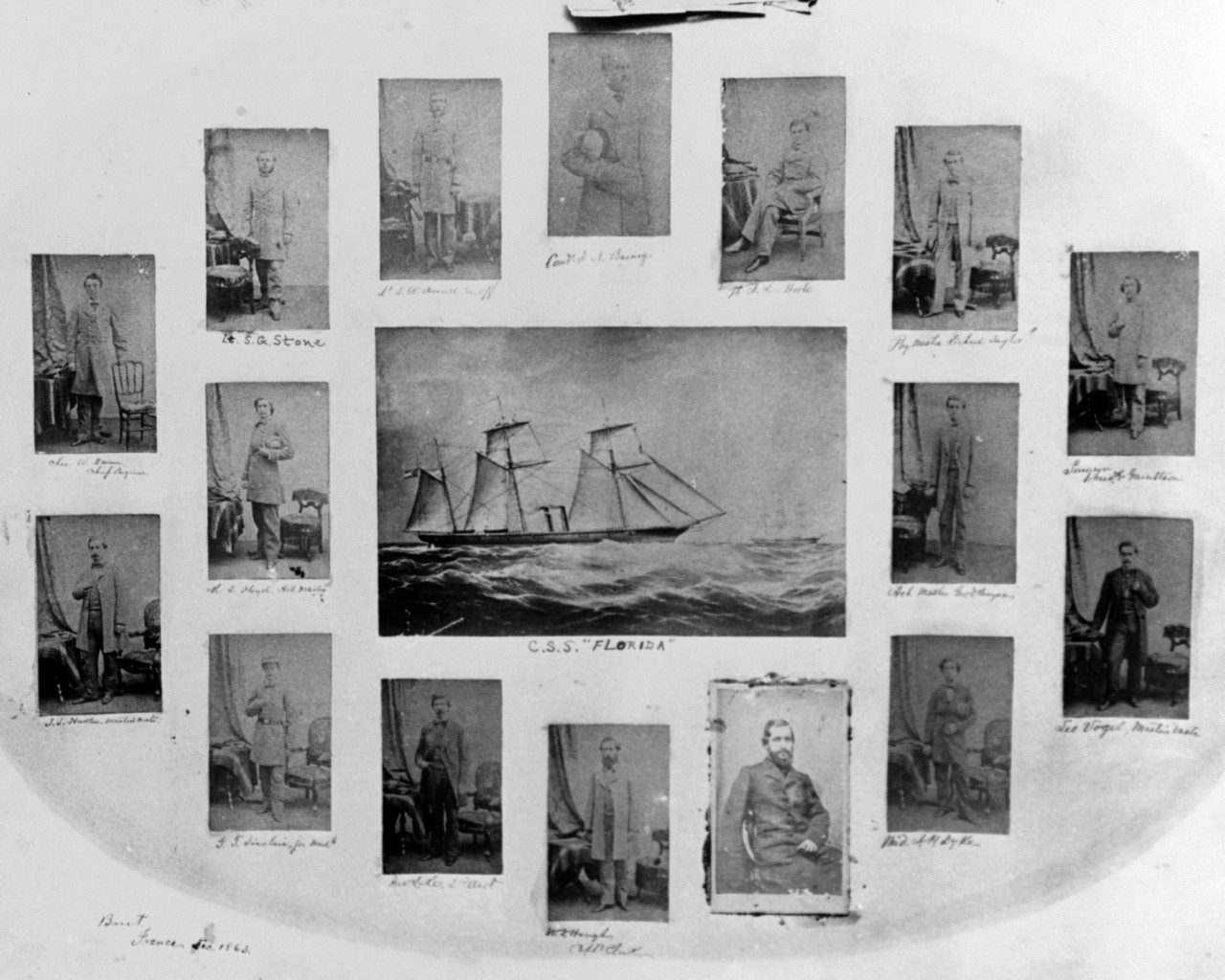
Montage of Photographs of Officers of the CSS Florida

Illustration from Harper's Weekly in 1863 of CSS Florida (left) burning the clipper Jacob Bell (right) off the West Indies on 13 February 1863. She had captured Jacob Bell the previous day.

CSS Florida was a sloop-of-war in the service of the Confederate States Navy. She served as a commerce raider during the American Civil War before being sunk in 1864.

== Service history ==
Florida was built by the British firm William C. Miller & Sons of Toxteth, Liverpool. Launched in December 1861, she was purchased by the Confederacy from Fawcett, Preston & Co., also of Liverpool, who provided her engines. Known in the shipyard as Oreto and initially called CSS Manassas by the Confederates, the ship was the first of several foreign-built commerce raiders commissioned as into the Confederate States Navy as CSS Florida. Union naval records often referred to her as Oreto or confused her with CSS Alabama, another Confederate vessel.

Florida departed England on 22 March 1862, bound for Nassau in the Bahamas. To avoid suspicions that she was destined for Confederate service, the ship was only loaded with enough coal to reach Nassau. However, once in Nassau she planned to meet with a Confederate ship, take on a portion of that ship's coal, and use the additional fuel to steam to the nearest Confederate port. However, having been built under foreign licence, she was the subject of much diplomatic and intelligence correspondence. The governor of Nassau prevented Florida from attempting a rendezvous with her planned tender in Nassau harbor, so the two ships met instead near the more isolated Green Cay. There, stores, armaments, and coal were taken aboard the ship. While anchored off Green Cay, she was officially commissioned into the Confederate States Navy as CSS Florida on August 17, with Lieutenant John Newland Maffitt in command.

During her outfitting, yellow fever raged among her crew, in five days reducing her effective force to one fireman and four deckhands. In desperate plight she ran across to the Spanish colony of Cuba. In Cárdenas, Lieutenant Maffitt too was stricken with the disease.

In this condition, against all probability, Maffitt sailed her from Cárdenas to Mobile, Alabama. In an audacious dash, the "Prince of Privateers" braved a hail of projectiles from the Union blockaders and raced through them to anchor beneath the guns of Fort Morgan in Mobile Bay, where she was received with a hero's welcome by the war-weary citizens of Mobile. Florida had been unable to fight back not only because of sickness but because rammers, sights, beds, locks and quoins - necessary to use her guns - had, inadvertently, not been loaded in the Bahamas. Having resupplied her stores armed with the gun accessories she lacked, along with added crew members, Florida escaped to sea on January 16, 1863, under (now) Captain John Newland Maffitt.

After coaling at Nassau, she spent six months off the coasts of North and South America and in the West Indies, with calls at neutral ports, all the while making captures and eluding the large Federal squadron pursuing her.

Florida sailed on July 27, 1863, from Bermuda for Brest, France, where she lay in the French naval dock from August 23, 1863, to February 12, 1864. There, broken in health, Maffitt relinquished command to Commander Joseph Nicholson Barney, whose ill health prompted an additional handover to Lieutenant Charles Manigault Morris. Departing for the West Indies, Florida bunkered (reloaded her coal bunkers) at Barbados, although the three months specified by British law had not elapsed since her last coaling at a British Empire port. She then skirted the U.S. coast, sailed east across the Atlantic Ocean to Tenerife in the Canary Islands and thence back southwest to Bahia, Brazil, arriving on October 4, 1864.

Anchored at Bahia on October 7, Florida, while her captain was ashore with half his crew, was caught defenseless in an illegal night attack by Commander Napoleon Collins, of the U.S. Navy steam sloop-of-war USS Wachusett. Towed to sea, she was sent to the United States as a prize, despite the Empire of Brazil's protests at the violation of its sovereignty. Commander Collins was court-martialed and was convicted of violating Brazilian territorial rights, but the verdict was set aside by United States Secretary of the Navy Gideon Welles. Collins won fame and eventual promotion for his daring capture of the raider.

At Newport News, Virginia, on November 28, 1864, Florida reached the end of her career when she sank under dubious circumstances after a collision with the United States Army Transport USAT Alliance, a troop ferry. Florida could therefore not be delivered to Brazil in satisfaction of the final court order, and could not rejoin the Confederate States Navy.

Florida captured 37 prizes in her impressive career. Two of her prizes were absorbed into the Confederate States Navy as CSS Tacony and CSS Clarence and in turn took 23 more prizes.

Today, many of the artifacts from CSS Florida are at the Hampton Roads Naval Museum.

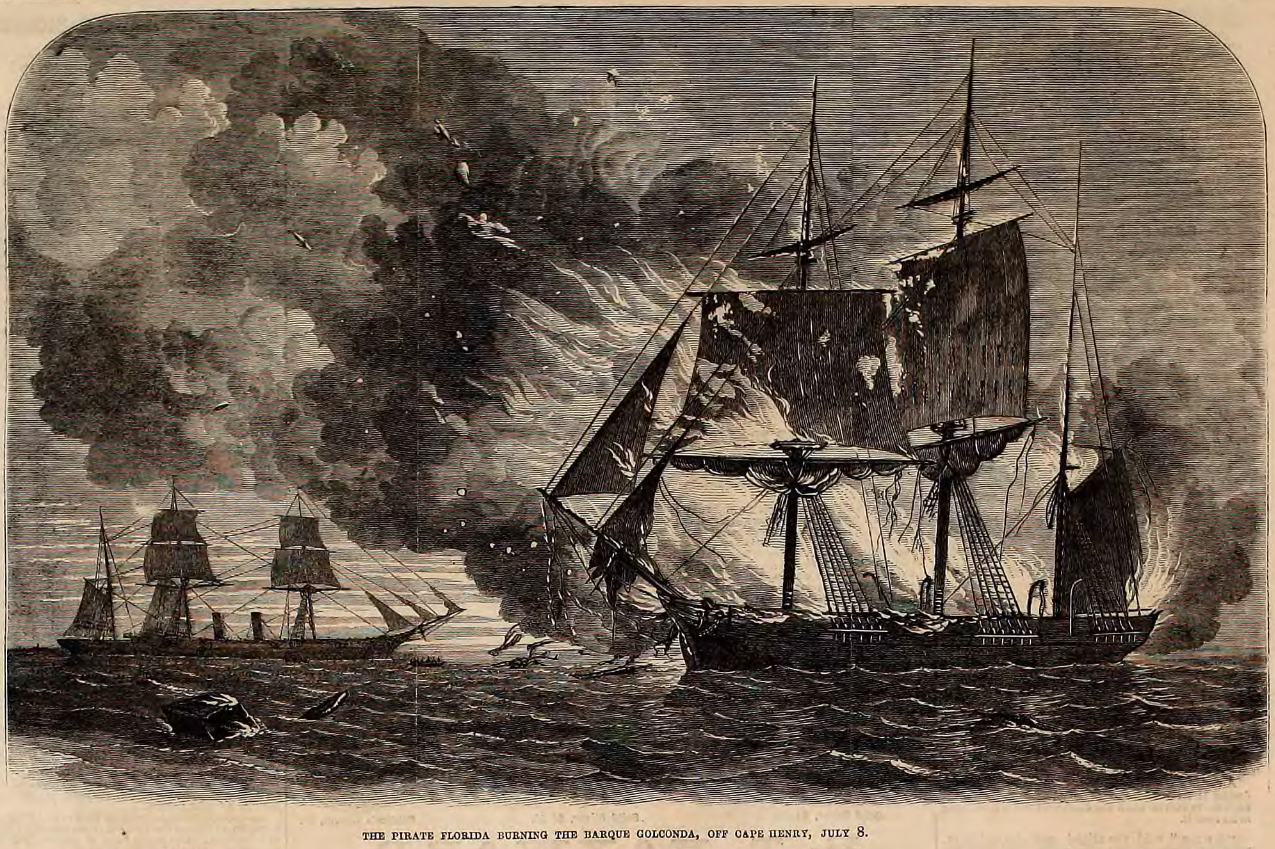
The pirate Florida burning the barque Golconda, off Cape Henry, July 8, 1864

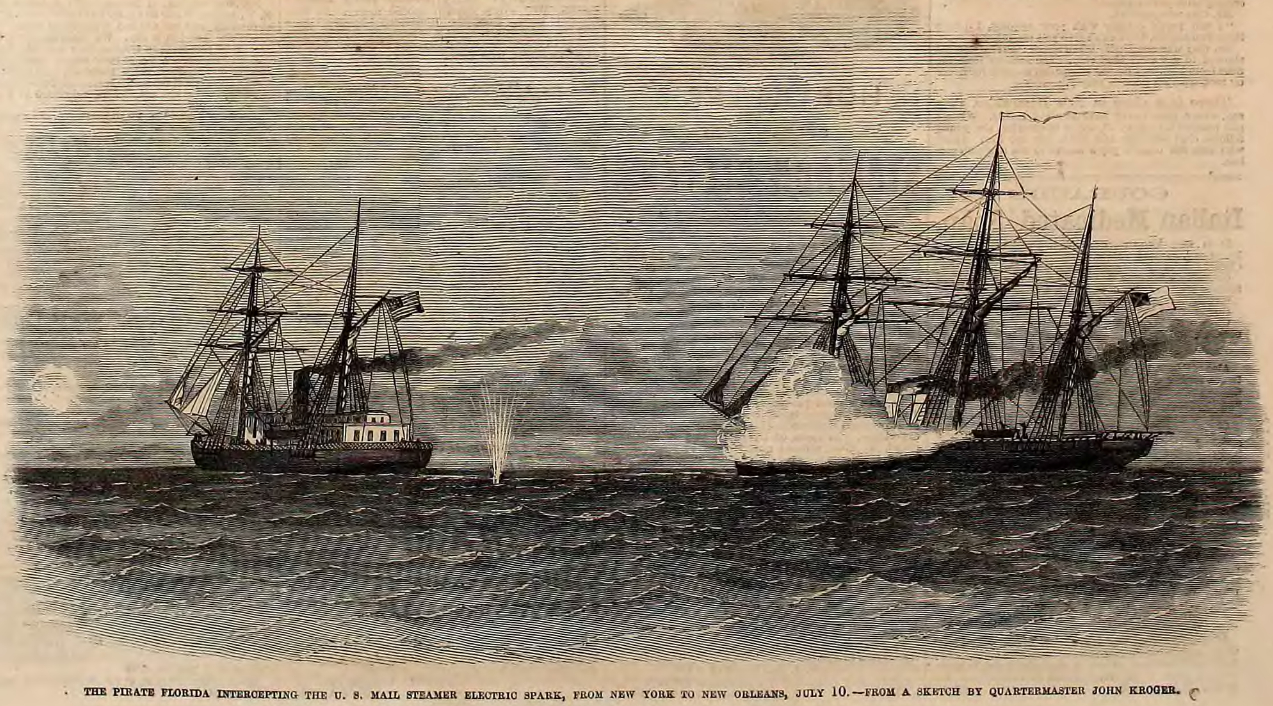
The Florida intercepting the U.S. Mail steamer Electric Spark, from New York to New Orleans, July 10, 1864
