= CSS Tacony =

History

Confederate States
- Name: Tacony
- Captured: June 12, 1863 by CSS Clarence
- Fate: Burned to prevent capture June 25, 1863

General characteristics
- Complement: 4 officers, 17 men
- Armament: 1 6-pounder boat howitzer

CSS Tacony was originally a bark captured by the Confederate cruiser CSS Clarence during the American Civil War and converted into a Confederate cruiser for commerce raiding.

The CSS Clarence, commanded by Lt. Charles W. Read, captured the Tacony on June 12, 1863, and since it was a better ship suited for commerce raiding, the crew and armaments were transferred to it and the Clarence was destroyed.

In its brief career as a Confederate cruiser, it captured several ships: The Whistling Ada, Arabella, Byzantium, Elizabeth Ann, Florence, Goodspeed, Isaac Webb, Z.A. Macomber, Marengo, Ripple, Rufus Choate, Shattemuc, Umpire, and Wanderer. Its final capture was the schooner Archer on June 25, 1863, which is a better ship suited for commerce raiding, the crew and armaments were transferred to it and the Tacony was destroyed.

== Officers and crew ==
- Lt. Charles W. Read, commander.
- Billups, Matthewson, and Pride, master's mates.
- Brown, engineer.
- 16 men.

== Notes and references ==
- Scharf, J. Thomas (1887). History of the Confederate States Navy. New York: Rogers & Sherwood.
