= John Thomas Scharf =

American soldier, lawyer, and historian (1843–1898)

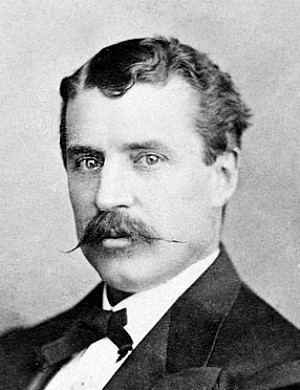
- Born: May 1, 1843; Baltimore, Maryland, US
- Died: February 28, 1898 (aged 54); New York City, US
- Education: M.A., LL.D.
- Alma mater: Georgetown University
- Occupations: historian, journalist, antiquarian, politician, lawyer and confederate states of america soldier and sailor
- Known for: Comprehensive histories

John Thomas Scharf (May 1, 1843 – February 28, 1898) was an American historian, author, journalist, antiquarian, politician, lawyer and Confederate States of America soldier and sailor. He is best known for his published historical works. Modern historians and researchers cite his comprehensive histories as primary source materials.

Scharf used a formulaic and detailed approach to preparing his historical works. He contacted everyone who could provide information about his subject and used detail questionnaires to capture responses to his inquiries. The J. Thomas Scharf Collection, 1730s–1892, held by the Maryland Historical Society, shows off his massive collection of original source materials.

Scharf was one of the first American historians to consistently use newspapers as a primary source. Rather than trying to analyze the source material, he often quoted at length from newspapers, magazines, pamphlets, and state and city documents. His books are written in the flowery style of his day, and several of his works, although long, are still considered among the best primary sources available. When writing about the American Civil War, the central event of his generation, he could not remain objective, and clearly articulated his strong pro-South perspective and prejudice about the war in which he fought. Still, his History of the Confederate States Navy remains a particularly valuable contribution to the literature of the American Civil War.

At the outbreak of the war, Scharf enlisted with the 1st Maryland Artillery. He fought in the Confederate States Army and Navy. Returning from the war, Scharf helped reorganize the Maryland state militia. He practiced law and took positions as a city editor for the Baltimore Evening News and managing editor for the Baltimore Sunday Telegram. He accumulated a mass of papers on the city of Baltimore and from these he published his first major work, The Chronicles of Baltimore.

In 1878, Scharf, a Democrat from Baltimore City-District 2, was elected and served one term in the Maryland General Assembly, House of Delegates. He served as Commissioner of the Land Office of Maryland from 1884 until 1892 and was an active member of the Maryland Historical Society. In the year before he died he was dismissed from his position as "Special Chinese Inspector" for the Southern District of New York, a post charged with enforcing the Chinese Exclusion Act of 1882 and the Geary Act of 1892.

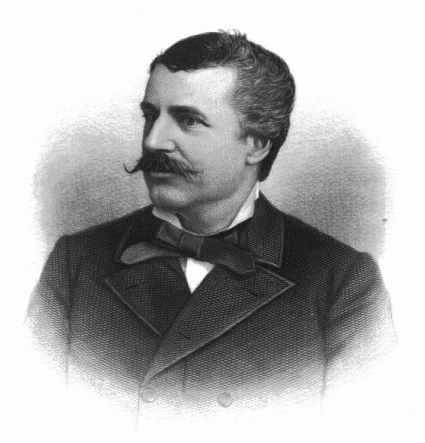
Colonel Scharf

== Works ==
- Scharf, J. Thomas (John Thomas) (1874). The chronicles of Baltimore : being a complete history of "Baltimore town" and Baltimore city from the earliest period to the present time. Baltimore : Turnbull Bros.
- —— (1879). History of Maryland, from the earliest period to the present day. Baltimore : J.B. Piet.
- —— (1882). History of western Maryland : being a history of Frederick, Montgomery, Carroll, Washington, Allegany, and Garrett counties from the earliest period to the present day; including biographical sketches of their representative men. Philadelphia : L. H. Everts.
- —— (1883). History of Saint Louis City and County, from the Earliest Periods to the Present Day, including Biographical Sketches of Representative Men. Philadelphia: Louis H. Everts and Co. "History of Saint Louis City and County, from the Earliest Periods to the Present Day, including Biographical Sketches of Representative Men."
- ——; Westcott, Thompson (1884). History of Philadelphia, 1609–1884. Philadelphia : L. H. Everts & co.
- —— (1886). History of Westchester county : New York, including Morrisania, Kings Bridge, and West Farms, which have been annexed to New York City /. Philadelphia : L.E. Preston & Co.
- —— (1887). Deer Park and Oakland: twins of the Alleghanies. Baltimore, The Lorborn publishing company.
- —— (1887). History of the Confederate States navy from its organization to the surrender of its last vessel. New York, Rogers & Sherwood.
- —— (1888). History of Delaware. 1609–1888. Philadelphia, L. J. Richards & co.
- Scharf, J. Thomas (John Thomas) (1892). The natural & industrial resources and advantages of Maryland, being a complete description of the counties of the state and the city of Baltimore. Annapolis, C. H. Baughman & Co., state printers.
- —— (1894). History of the Confederate States Navy from Its Organization to the Surrender of Its Last Vessel (alternate version). J. McDonough.
