= CSS Clarence =

History

Confederate States
- Name: Clarence
- Launched: 1857
- Captured: May 6, 1863 by the CSS Florida and converted to the CSN
- Fate: Burned to prevent capture on June 12, 1863

General characteristics
- Length: 114 ft (35 m)
- Beam: 24 ft (7.3 m)
- Draft: 11 ft (3.4 m)
- Complement: 4 officers, 17 men
- Armament: 1 6-pounder boat howitzer, several Quaker guns

CSS Clarence, also known as Coquette, was originally a brig from Baltimore captured by the Confederate cruiser CSS Florida during the American Civil War and converted into a Confederate cruiser for commerce raiding.

Built in 1857 for Baltimore, Maryland fruit dealer J. Crosby, it was transporting a cargo of coffee from Rio de Janeiro, Brazil, to Baltimore when the CSS Florida captured the Clarence off the coast of Brazil. Lt. Charles W. Read was appointed commander and a sufficient number of the Florida's crew were transferred to the new cruiser to man the ship.

Lieutenant Read had requested that, rather than burn Clarence, he might try, with the ship's papers, to sail into Hampton Roads, Virginia, and if possible destroy or capture a Union gunboat and burn Union merchant vessels congregated at Fortress Monroe. Florida's Commander John Newland Maffitt armed Clarence with one gun so that Read might capture prizes on his way to Hampton Roads.

In its brief career as a Confederate cruiser it captured a number of ships: The Whistling Wind, Kate Stewart, Mary Alvina, Mary Schindler were burned, and the Alfred H. Partridge was bonded. Its final capture was the bark Tacony on June 12, 1863, which being a better ship suited for commerce raiding, the crew and armaments were transferred to it and the Clarence was destroyed.

== Officers and crew ==
- Lt. Charles W. Read, commander
- Billups, Matthewson, and Pride, master's mates
- Brown, engineer
- 16 men
