= Attack on USS New Ironsides =

Battle of the American Civil War

Coordinates: 32.725°N 79.843°W

- Part of the American Civil War
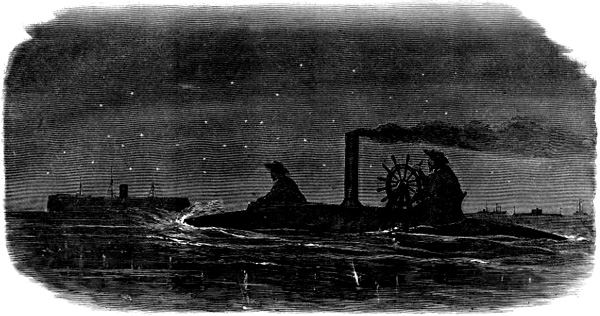
- CSS David approaching the USS New Ironsides.
| Date | 5 October 1863 |
| Location | Charleston Harbor, Charleston, South Carolina |
| Result | Confederate States victory |

Belligerents
| (Confederate States of America) Confederate States | United States |

Commanders and leaders
| (Confederate States of America) William T. Glassell | Stephen C. Rowan |

Strength
| Torpedo boat David | Ironclad New Ironsides |

Casualties and losses
| 2 captured David damaged | 1 killed 1 wounded 1 injured New Ironsides damaged |

The attack on USS New Ironsides in October 1863 was one of the first successful torpedo boat engagements in history. Confederate forces in Charleston, South Carolina deployed the newly built semi-submersible CSS David to attach a spar torpedo to the hull of USS New Ironsides. Though the attack is regarded as a rebel victory, the Union ship was saved from serious damage.

== Attack ==
Because it was a great impediment to Confederate commerce and warfare, there was no choice but to try to lift the Union blockade in any way possible. CSS David was one of the South's secret weapons. Similar to the submarine H.L. Hunley, the boat was designed to destroy enemy ships by stealthily sneaking up to their sides and placing an explosive on their hulls. David was only fifty feet long with a beam of six feet and a draft of five feet. Her crew consisted of just four officers and men. She was under the command of Lieutenant William T. Glassell during her three year career. On the night of 5 October, at about 8:00 am the torpedo boat headed out from the pier toward the fourteen gun ironclad USS New Ironsides, which was considered the most formidable warship in the navy. She had also survived a failed torpedo boat attack in August 1863. An hour later the rebels were approaching the ironclad when lookouts spotted them fifty yards away, just before they attached the torpedo. The Union commander Captain Stephen C. Rowan reported the following: "At 9 p.m. discovered a very peculiar looking steamer which at first appeared like a boat standing toward our starboard beam from seaward; hailed her rapidly four times, and she making no reply, fired into her with musketry; she returned fire, dangerously wounding Ensign C.W. Howard in charge of the deck the steamer struck us near No. 6 port, starboard side, exploding a large torpedo, shaking the vessel and throwing up an immense column of water, part of which fell on our decks."

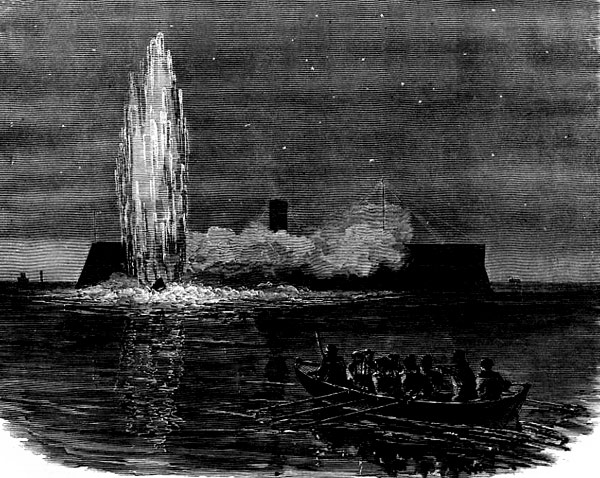
USS New Ironsides when the torpedo detonated.

When the water fell back, some of it went down David's smokestack and put out the fire in her engine. The explosion ripped a large fissure in the ironclad's starboard quarter and her crew had to quickly repair the hole but the ship remained leaky. Damage was also inflicted to the ship's armory bulkhead and some storerooms, but casualties were light. There were two wounded, one of whom later died, and a third man who suffered from "confusions". CSS David was heavily damaged, enough for her commander to order his men to abandon ship. Ensign C. W. Cannon could not swim so he remained aboard and after the others left they tried to swim for nearby Morris Island under fire. It was at this time Assistant Engineer J. H. Tomb decided to go back to the torpedo boat where he restarted the fire and sailed away. The remaining two Confederates, including Lieutenant Glassel, surrendered to the men of New Ironsides after evacuating David. New Ironsides was apparently not in threat of sinking and the damage proved to be mostly superficial. She returned to blockade duty after taking a short time in Philadelphia to make repairs. CSS David was repaired as well and she eventually made attacks on USS Memphis and USS Wabash. Several torpedo boats of the David-class were captured at the end of the war. David may have been among them.
