= USS Rowan =

Four ships in the United States Navy have been named USS Rowan after Stephen Clegg Rowan.

- The first USS Rowan (TB-8) was a torpedo boat, commissioned in 1899 and decommissioned in 1912.
- The second USS Rowan (DD-64) was a Sampson-class destroyer, commissioned in 1916, served in World War I and decommissioned in 1922.
- The third USS Rowan (DD-405) was a Benham-class destroyer, commissioned in 1939, served in World War II and sunk by enemy action in September 1943.
- The fourth USS Rowan (DD-782) was a Gearing-class destroyer, commissioned in 1945, decommissioned in 1975 and transferred to Taiwan, but sank while under tow in 1977.
