= Rowan Hall =

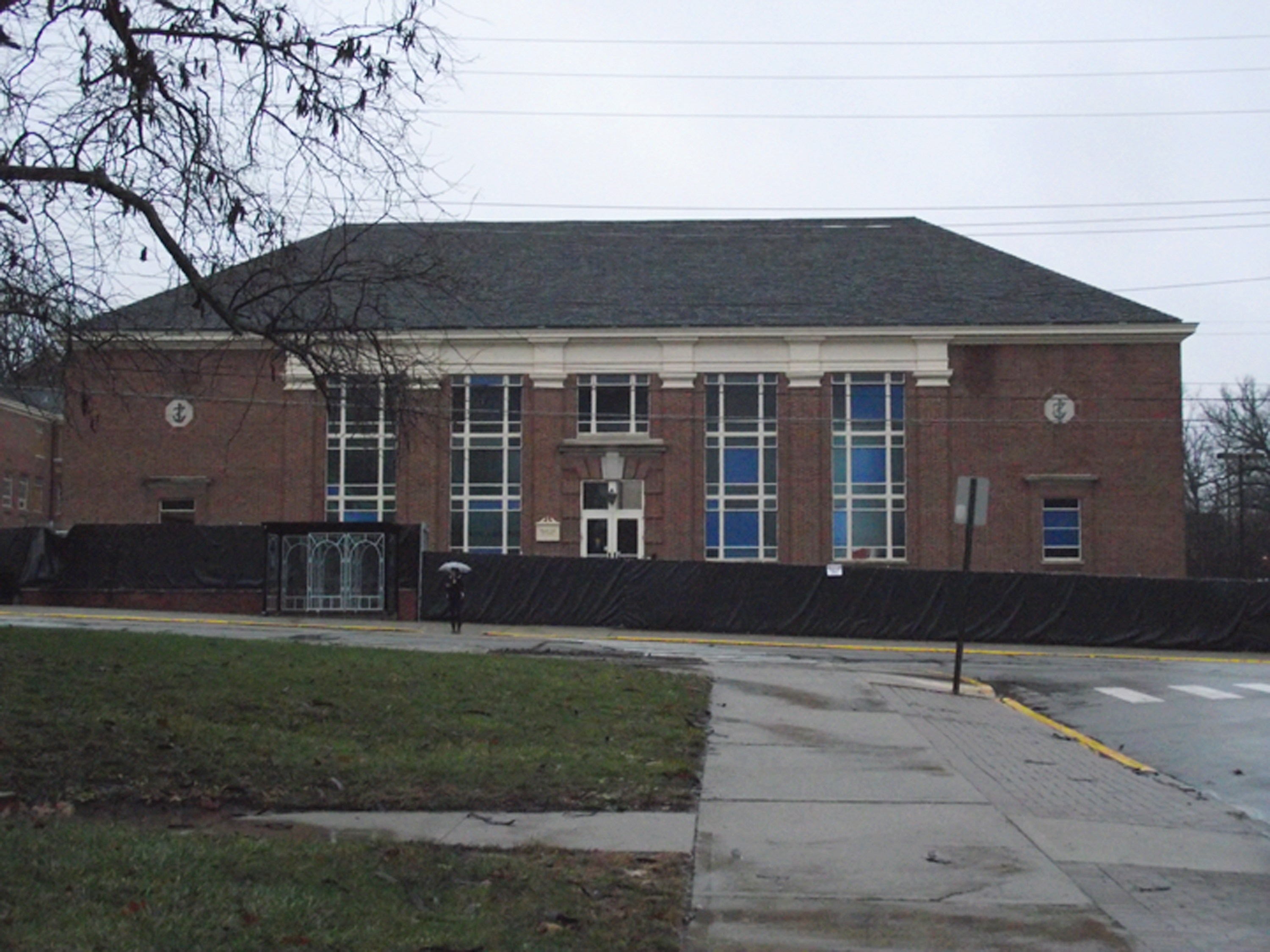
- Rowan Hall as of November 2011

- Location within Ohio

General information
- Architectural style: Georgian
- Location: Oxford, Ohio, United States
- Coordinates: 39°30′26.88″N 84°43′59.19″W
- Inaugurated: Oct. 28 1949
- Cost: USD500,000
- Owner: Miami University

Technical details
- Floor area: 11,438ft²

Design and construction
- Architects: Potter, Tyler & Martin
- Main contractor: Frank Messer & Sons

Rowan Hall was an academic building at Miami University, formerly home to the university's Naval Science department. Constructed in 1949, the hall was named after Miami alumnus Admiral Stephen Clegg Rowan. In 2011, Rowan, along with two other academic buildings, were combined to form a new student union.

== History ==
The hall was originally to be the home of Miami University’s Naval Science department. Here, the Naval Science department housed Navy equipment, such as large artillery guns and other small munitions. Rowan Hall served this purpose until 1970 when the Naval Science department was moved into the recently constructed Millett Hall. In 2011, Rowan, along with Culler and Gaskill Halls, were re-purposed and renovated to form a new student union, the Armstrong Student Center. Rowan's facade remains intact, and much of the building's former interior serves as a student sitting and study area.

=== Namesake ===
Stephen Clegg Rowan attended Miami University in 1825–1826. He was the first graduate of Miami to attend the Naval School in Annapolis, even without any Naval training at the university. He participated in three wars during his tenure in the Navy—the Seminole War, the Mexican–American War, and the Civil War. He retired on February 26, 1889 with 63 years of service as an Admiral. He died not long after on March 31, 1890.

== Student occupation ==
One of the most significant moments in Rowan Hall’s history is the occupation of the hall in 1970 during an anti-Vietnam War rally held by the students. The students were originally occupying Roudebush Hall, the main administrative building on campus, when one suggested that they go to Rowan Hall as it housed the university's ROTC program. Along with the anti-war protesters, there were members of the Black Student Action Association protesting racial inequality. The occupation included 300 to 400 students who locked themselves in around 5 p.m. on April 15, 1970. The occupation lasted only until 10:45 that night when the State Highway Patrol entered the building and arrested 176 students. Outside the building, the police used riot control measures—tear gas, mace, and dogs—to disperse the crowd. This sit-in led to further student protests demanding amnesty for those who had been suspended for the occupations, revising racial admissions, and in general protest of the police action taken during the event.
