= Stephen Clegg Rowan =

American admiral

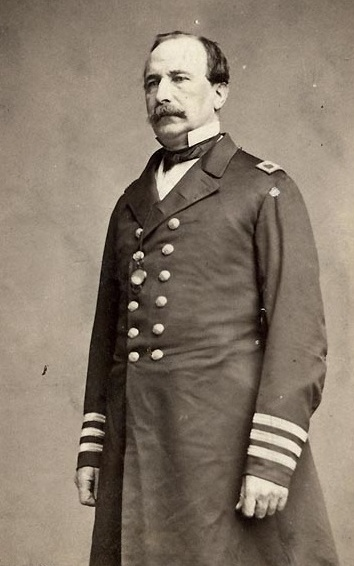
- Stephen C. Rowan in 1862
- Born: December 25, 1808; Dublin, Ireland
- Died: March 31, 1890 (aged 81); Washington, D.C., U.S.
- Burial place: Oak Hill Cemetery; Washington, D.C., U.S.
- Military career
- Allegiance: United States
- Branch: United States Navy
- Service years: 1826–1889
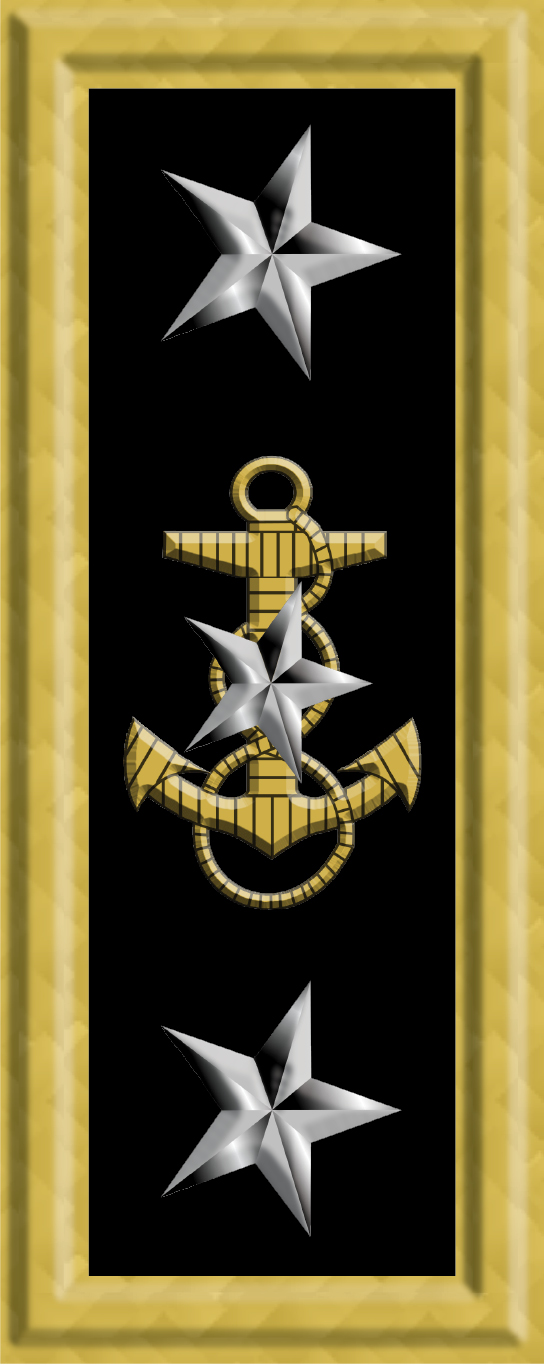
- Rank: Vice admiral
- Commands: Pawnee; New Ironsides; Asiatic Squadron
- Conflicts: Mexican–American War; Battle of Monterey; American Civil War; Action of October 5, 1863

Stephen Clegg Rowan (December 25. 1808 – March 31, 1890) was a vice admiral in the United States Navy, who served during the Mexican–American War and the American Civil War.

== Early life and career ==
Born in Dublin, Ireland, Rowan came to the United States at the age of 10 and lived in Piqua, Ohio. Rowan was a graduate of Miami University and was appointed as a midshipman in the U.S. Navy on February 1, 1826, at the age of 17. Later, he took an active role in the Mexican–American War, serving as executive officer of the sloop Cyane during the capture of Monterey, California on July 7, 1846, and in the occupation of both San Diego and Los Angeles. In January 1847 he led a provisional battalion, with the nominal rank of major, of seven companies of naval infantry (along with a company of artillery and a company of sappers and miners) for the recapture of Los Angeles.

== Civil War service ==
Captain of the steam sloop Pawnee at the outbreak of the American Civil War, he attempted to relieve Fort Sumter and to burn the Norfolk Navy Yard. In the fall of 1861, he assisted in the capture of the forts at Hatteras Inlet; then, taking command of a flotilla in the North Carolina sounds, he cooperated in the capture of Roanoke Island in February 1862. Promoted simultaneously to captain and commodore for gallantry, he then supported the capture of Elizabeth City, Edenton, and New Bern. During the summer of 1863, he commanded the broadside ironclad New Ironsides on blockade duty off Charleston, South Carolina and the following August assumed command of Federal forces in the North Carolina sounds. During this time the rebel semi-submersible CSS David attacked the New Ironsides with a spar torpedo. In the ensuing explosion, one man was killed and a large hole was torn into the ironclad but she continued her blockading duties.

== Post Civil War service ==
Commissioned rear admiral on July 25, 1866, Rowan served as commandant of the Norfolk Navy Yard until 1867, when he assumed command of the Asiatic Squadron. Returning in 1870, he was appointed vice admiral, following the death of Admiral David Farragut and the promotion of Vice Admiral David Dixon Porter in August of that year. In December 1870 Rowan reached the mandatory retirement age of 62 but, like admirals Farragut and Porter before him, he was allowed to remain on active duty.

Rowan served as commandant of the New York Navy Yard from 1872 to 1876, as governor of the Naval Asylum at Philadelphia, Pennsylvania, in 1881, and as superintendent of the Naval Observatory, Washington, D.C., from 1882 until his retirement in 1889 at the age of 80.

Rowan had a 63-year career, which was one of the longest in the history of the United States Navy.

In 1882 Admiral Rowan was elected as a First Class Companion of the District of Columbia Commander of the Military Order of the Loyal Legion of the United States (MOLLUS). He was assigned MOLLUS insignia number 2510. Rowan's son, Hamilton Rowan, an officer in the U.S. Army, was elected as a Second Class Companion of MOLLUS and became a First Class Companion upon his father's death.

Rowan died in Washington, D.C., on March 31, 1890. He was buried at Oak Hill Cemetery in Washington, D.C.

== Dates of rank ==
- Midshipman – February 1, 1826
- Passed midshipman – April 28, 1832
- Lieutenant – March 8, 1837
- Commander – September 14, 1855
- Captain and commodore – July 16, 1862
- Rear admiral – July 25, 1866
- Vice admiral – August 15, 1870
- Retired list – February 26, 1889

== Namesakes ==
- Four United States Navy ships have been named USS Rowan for him.
- Rowan Hall at Miami University is named in his memory.
- A public elementary school in San Diego, California, is named Stephen Rowan Elementary.
- A small park in the Shawnee neighborhood of Piqua, Rowan's hometown, containing a memorial cannon, is named Rowan Park.

== See also ==
Military offices
Preceded by John R. Goldsborough	Commander, Asiatic Squadron; 18 April 1868 – 19 August 1870	Succeeded by John Rodgers
