= USS Rowan (DD-782) =

Gearing-class destroyer

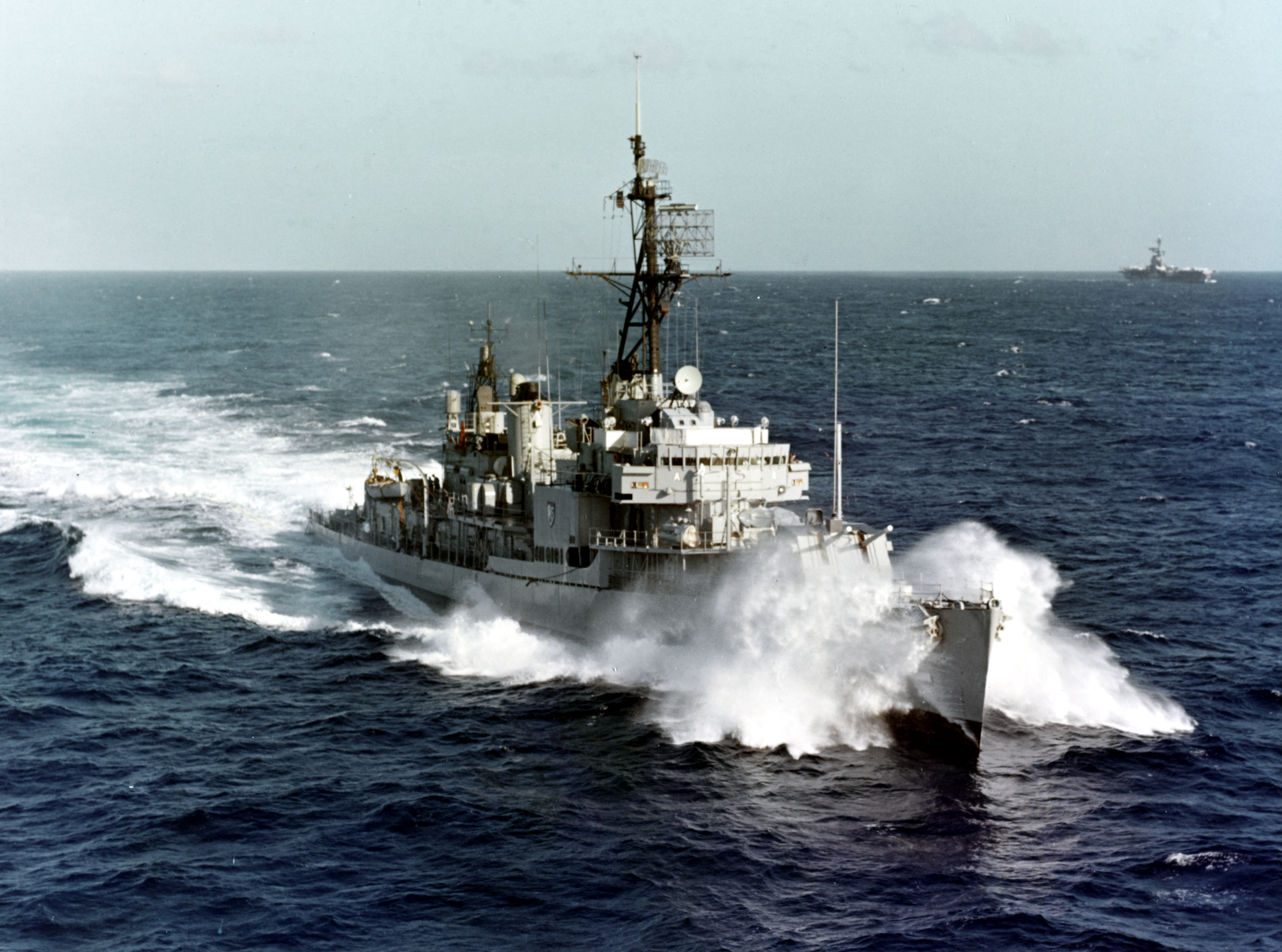
- USS Rowan underway in 1965

History

United States
- Name: Rowan
- Namesake: Stephen C. Rowan
- Builder: Todd Pacific Shipyards
- Laid down: 25 March 1944
- Launched: 29 December 1944
- Sponsored by: Mrs. David S. Folsom
- Commissioned: 31 March 1945
- Modernized: 1963-1964 (FRAM IB)
- Decommissioned: 18 December 1975
- Stricken: 30 January 1976
- Identification: Callsign: NTFJ; Hull number: DD-782
- Motto: If It's There, We'll Be There
- Nickname(s): Black Bird
- Honors and awards: See Awards
- Fate: Transferred to the Republic of China, 1 June 1977

History

Taiwan
- Name: Chao Yang; (朝陽)
- Namesake: Chao Yang
- Acquired: 1 June 1977
- Identification: Hull number: DD-916
- Fate: Wrecked, 22 August 1977

General characteristics
- Class & type: Gearing-class destroyer
- Displacement: 3,460 long tons (3,516 t) full
- Length: 390 ft 6 in (119.02 m)
- Beam: 40 ft 10 in (12.45 m)
- Draft: 14 ft 4 in (4.37 m)
- Propulsion: Geared turbines, 2 shafts, 60,000 shp (45 MW)
- Speed: 35 knots (65 km/h; 40 mph)
- Range: 4,500 nmi (8,300 km) at 20 kn (37 km/h; 23 mph)
- Complement: 336
- Armament: 6 × 5"/38 caliber guns; 12 × 40 mm AA guns; 11 × 20 mm AA guns; 10 × 21 inch (533 mm) torpedo tubes; 6 × depth charge projectors; 2 × depth charge tracks

USS Rowan (DD-782) was a Gearing-class destroyer of the United States Navy, the fourth Navy ship named for Vice Admiral Stephen C. Rowan (1805–1890).

== Construction and career ==
Rowan was laid down on 25 March 1944 by Todd Pacific Shipyards, Inc., Seattle, Washington; launched 29 December 1944; sponsored by Mrs. David S. Folsom, great-grandniece of Vice Admiral Rowan; and commissioned on 31 March 1945.

=== Service in the United States Navy ===
After completing shakedown off southern California, Rowan returned to Puget Sound. On 20 July she departed Seattle for Hawaii, whence she continued on to Okinawa. Arriving after Japan's surrender, she remained in the Ryukyus until 9 September, then moved on to Japan where she supported occupation forces into December. At the end of December, she retraced her route; returned to Okinawa, thence, in late January 1946, continued on to the United States.

==== Korean War ====
Arriving at San Diego on 10 February, Rowan was immobilized until February 1947 when she resumed operations along the west coast and in Hawaiian waters. Six months later she deployed to the western Pacific for operations in Japanese, Chinese, and Korean waters. She returned to San Diego on 30 April 1948; conducted local operations into 1949, and deployed again to WestPac from March to November of that year.

On 25 June 1950 the North Korean Army crossed the 38th Parallel into the Republic of Korea (South Korea). Six weeks later Rowan sailed for Japan. She arrived at Yokosuka on 19 August, shifted to Sasebo on the 21st, and, on the 25th, commenced operations off Korea.

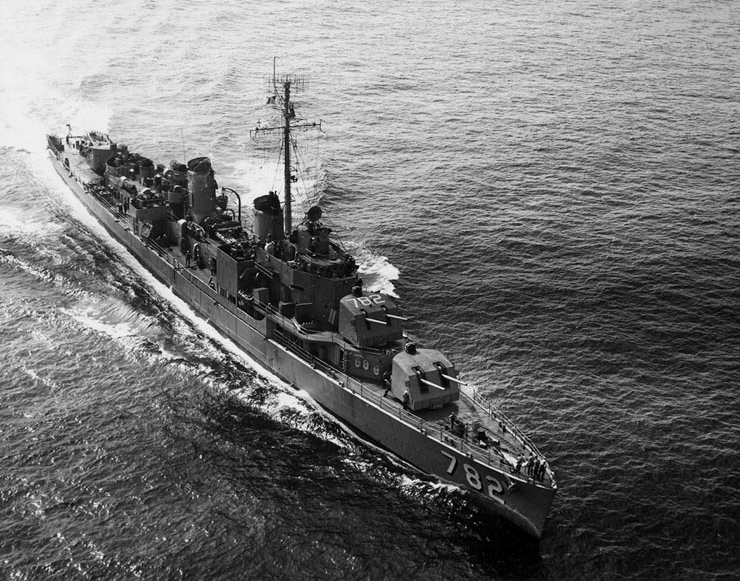
Rowan underway, circa 1950

On 12 September she departed Sasebo for her first support mission for a wartime amphibious landing. On the 15th she arrived off Inchon with Task Force 90 (TF 90); provided support while the 1st and 5th Marines went ashore; then remained in the area until after Allied forces had pushed back across the 38th Parallel. On 3 October she left Inchon to take up duties off the Korean east coast.

In mid-October Rowan arrived with the Wonsan attack force. South Korean forces, however, took that city prior to "D-Day", 20 October, and the 1st Marines were landed on the Kalma Peninsula on the 26th. Rowan remained in the Wonsan area, into November; then provided gunfire support and served on plane guard duty as U.N. forces pushed to the Yalu River and then retreated. In February 1951 she sailed for home.

Local and Hawaiian training operations occupied the remainder of the year and in early January 1952 Rowan again headed for Korea. By 15 February she was back in the Wonsan area. Seven days later, while patrolling the northern sweep area, she took a direct hit from a North Korean shore battery on the portside which damaged a 40 mm gun, her radar, and superstructure. During the ensuing duel, Rowan and James E. Kyes destroyed three guns and an ammunition dump.

On 22 February 1952, she suffered minor damage after 1 hit from a shore battery at Hungnam, North Korea, no casualties.

During the Siege of Wonsan, On 18 June 1953 the Rowan received damage from Communist Shore Batteries. Forty five rounds of shellfire bracketed her, five striking. One shell, thought to be 155mm, punched a two-foot hole on her starboard side at frame 209, 8 inches above the waterline. Another shell demolished the Mark 34 Radar. Several other holes were visible in her side. Nine crewmen were injured, two seriously.

Into June Rowan continued to operate off the embattled peninsula on gunfire support and interdiction missions and as plane guard and escort for the carriers. In late June she steamed south, served on the Taiwan Patrol Force into July then returned briefly to Korea, and at the end of the month sailed for San Diego.

Rowan was back in the western Pacific for her third Korean tour by mid-April 1953. Again she operated off Korea through the spring and shifted to Taiwan patrol duty in July. She returned to Korea in August and through September conducted patrols off that coast to maintain the uneasy truce that began in late July. On 2 October she departed Yokosuka for California.

After Korea, Rowan remained in active service. Through the 1950s and into the 1960s she rotated between assignments with the 7th Fleet in the western Pacific and operations and exercises with the 1st Fleet off the west coasts of the Americas and in the Hawaiian area. During the early 1960s she also supported scientific experiments: recovering a Nuclear Emulsion Recovery Vehicle (NERV) capsule containing information on the Earth's atmosphere (September 1960); and participating in Operation Dominic, nuclear tests in the Kiritimati Island area (March–July 1962).

On 3 June 1963, Rowan departed San Diego for a Fleet Rehabilitation and Modernization (FRAM) I conversion at the Philadelphia Naval Shipyard. She returned to California a year later with improved living spaces, up-to-date communications, and ASROC and DASH weapons systems. Local operations took her into the fall and on 5 January 1965 she resumed her schedule of WestPac deployments, this time to another combat area – Vietnam.

==== Vietnam War ====
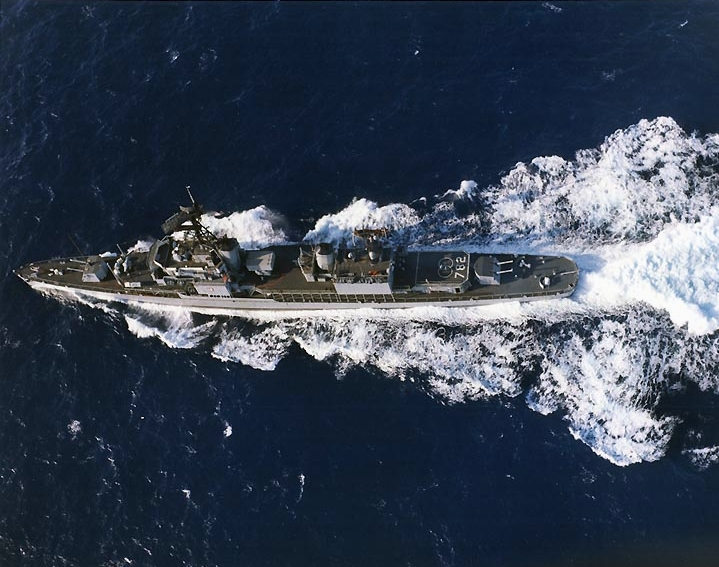
Rowan underway in the Western Pacific, in 1965, showing her FRAM I modifications.

Off Vietnam into the summer; she provided gunfire support for units of the Vietnamese Navy Junk Force and Allied ground forces during operations in the Qui Nhon area and served on "Market Time" patrol to interdict the Vietnam communists' coastal, waterborne logistics line. In August she returned to San Diego, but in May 1966 was back off the South Vietnamese coast to support Vietnamese troops in the IV Corps area. Later adding plane guard duty to her activities, she continued Vietnamese operations until August, when she departed for San Diego and more "routine" duties with the 1st Fleet.

In November she served as gunnery and anti-submarine warfare (ASW) Schoolship at San Diego. In December she conducted evaluation tests off California. Most of 1967 was spent preparing for or undergoing overhaul. In the fall she resumed her 7th Fleet deployments in support of ground operations in Vietnam, this time in the IV and II Corps areas and on plane guard duty in Tonkin Gulf. Detached in April 1968, Rowan rejoined the 7th Fleet on 6 April 1969, and after operations in the Sea of Japan as part of Operation Formation Star, the Rowan again served off Vietnam, returning to San Diego in September for local operations which took her into 1970.

Late in January 1970, she entered the drydock at Hunter's Point Naval Shipyard for overhaul. Rowan's overhaul was completed 15 June and she returned to normal operations off the coast of southern California until 8 September. On that date, she was redeployed to the western Pacific, operating often along the Vietnamese coast.

Rowan did not return to the United States until 12 March 1971. Upon arrival in San Diego, she resumed operations off the west coast and continued to be so employed into October. On 20 October 1971, Rowan again steamed westward out of San Diego, bound for Yokosuka, Japan, and, ultimately, the coast of Vietnam. This time she departed on an extended deployment, remaining in the western Pacific through 1973.

On 27 August 1972, Rowan, USS Newport News, USS Providence and USS Robison made a night raid into Haiphong Harbor shelling the port area from a distance of 2 miles (3.2 km). After leaving the harbor two Vietnam People's Navy torpedo boats engaged the ships 27 miles (43 km) southeast of Haiphong with one sunk by the Newport News and the other set on fire by the Rowan and then sunk by a Navy A-7 jet.

The Rowan along with approximately 50 other U.S. Navy ships participated in "Operation Frequent Wind" on 29 and 30 April 1975. 1,373 U.S. citizens and 5,595 Vietnamese and third country nationals were evacuated by military and Air America helicopters to U.S. Navy ships off-shore in an approximately 24-hour period, immediately preceding the fall of Saigon.

==== Decommissioning ====
Rowan decommissioned at 32nd St Naval Base in San Diego, California, on 18 December 1975, was struck from the Navy List on 30 January 1976 and was transferred to the Republic of China on 1 June 1977 with the name ROCS Chao Yang (DD-16).

On 22 August, she was being towed to her homeport Kaohsiung for commissioning and the cable broke when she was caught in Typhoon Aimee, and stranded on the Pingtung Fangliao coast. It was assessed that it could not be repaired and dismantled on the spot as material for other warships, her sister ship Yue Yang had used 3 of the boiler from Chao Yang. Before the ship was received, it was suggested to change its name to avoid a homophonic name of Chao Yang, but it was not approved. In addition, the DD-16 hull number was plagued by disasters, and the Navy no longer uses this hull number.

== Awards ==
Rowan earned four battle stars for Korean War service and eleven for Vietnam War service.
