= Roland N. Smoot =

American vice admiral

Roland Nesbit Smoot
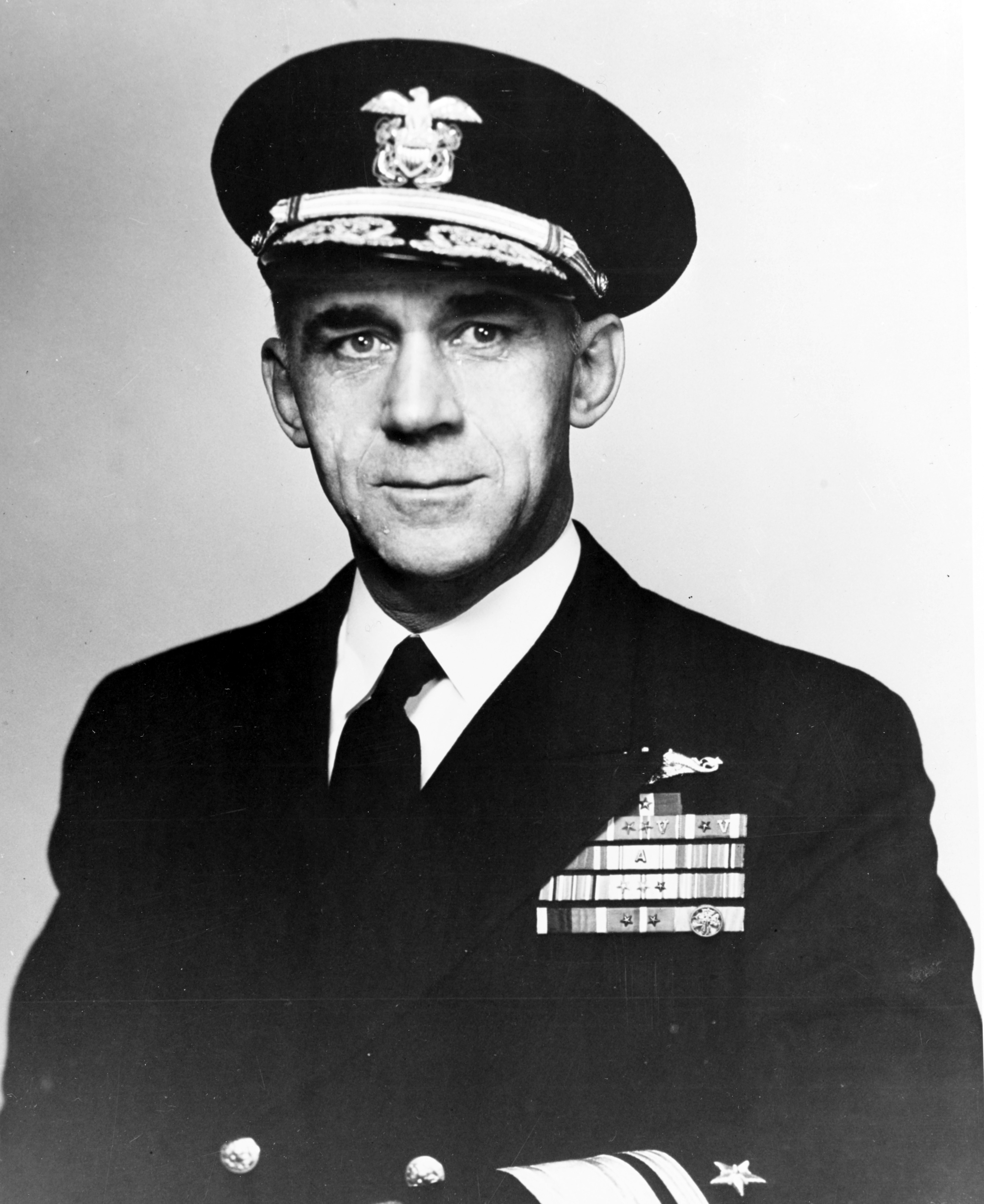
- Vice Admiral Roland N. Smoot, USN
- Born: May 7, 1901; Provo, Utah, US
- Died: February 13, 1984 (aged 82); Seal Beach, California, US
- Relatives: Abraham O. Smoot (grandfather); Brigham Smoot (father); Reed Smoot (uncle)
- Military career
- Allegiance: United States
- Branch: United States Navy
- Service years: 1923–1962
- Rank: Vice admiral
- Commands: Taiwan Defense Command; Cruiser Division 3 USS Newport News; Destroyer Squadron 14; USS Monssen; USS Aulick
- Conflicts: World War II: Doolittle Raid; Battle of Midway; Battle of Savo Island; Battle of Guadalcanal; Battle of Leyte; Battle of Iwo Jima; Battle of Okinawa; Korean War; Second Taiwan Strait Crisis
- Awards: Navy Cross (2); Distinguished Service Medal; Legion of Merit (2); Bronze Star Medal (3); Navy Commendation Medal (2)

Roland Nesbit Smoot (May 7, 1901 – February 13, 1984) was a highly decorated officer in the United States Navy with the rank of vice admiral. A graduate of the United States Naval Academy, he distinguished himself several times during his service with destroyers in Pacific and was decorated with two Navy Crosses, the United States Navy second-highest decoration awarded for valor in combat.

Smoot later rose to the flag rank and held several important assignment including Command of Cruiser Division Three and Mine Force of the United States Pacific Fleet. He completed his service as commander, United States Taiwan Defense Command in May 1962.

== Early career ==
Roland N. Smoot was born on May 7, 1901, in Provo, Utah, the son of Mormon missionary and an executive of the Utah-Idaho Sugar Company, Brigham Smoot and his wife Margaret. He came from deeply religious family, because his maternal grandfather was Abraham O. Smoot, an early leader of the Church of Jesus Christ of Latter-day Saints (LDS Church) and his uncle Reed Smoot was a member of the Quorum of the Twelve Apostles.

Young Roland graduated from high school in Salt Lake City, Utah, and received an appointment to the United States Naval Academy at Annapolis, Maryland, in June 1919. While at the Academy, Smoot was active in football and was nicknamed "Smut". Among his classmates were several future flag officers including future Chief of Naval Operations Arleigh Burke; another four-star admiral Robert L. Dennison; Marine four-star general Merrill B. Twining; Vice admirals Frederick Moosbrugger, Frederick M. Trapnell; and Rear admiral John G. Crommelin, Samuel G. Fuqua and George A. T. Washburn.

Smoot graduated with Bachelor of Science degree on June 8, 1923, and was commissioned ensign on that date. He was subsequently assigned to destroyer Chase operating with the Atlantic Fleet. Smoot served aboard Chase until June 1925, when he was ordered to the Naval Submarine Base New London, Connecticut, for submarine instruction, which he completed in December that year.

He was subsequently assigned to submarine USS S-7 under Lieutenant Clifford H. Roper and served as her Navigator off the coast of California and Panama and was promoted to Lieutenant (junior grade) on June 8, 1926. Smoot was transferred to submarine S-26 and served as her Engineer officer until June 1928, when he was then ordered back to the Naval Academy for postgraduate course in engineering. He spent one year there and was ordered to the Pennsylvania State College in Carlisle, Pennsylvania, where he graduated in June 1930 with Master's degree in mechanical and diesel engineering. He was also promoted to lieutenant on June 5, 1930.

Smoot was then assigned to the newly commissioned submarine Narwhal and served as her Engineer officer under the command of Lieutenant Commander John H. Brown. He took part in her shakedown cruise to West Indies and then participated in the sea trials off the Boon Island in Gulf of Maine. Narwhal dived to 332 Feet and remained there for 45 minutes, breaking the Navy record for depth. Smoot was transferred to the battleship Maryland in June 1935 and served under Captain George S. Bryan during the patrols in the Caribbean and Atlantic until May 1938. During that period, Smoot completed Naval War College's correspondence courses in optics; international law; and strategy & tactics.

He was subsequently ordered to the Pearl Harbor Navy Yard, Hawaii, and appointed Engineer Superintendent. For his new assignment, Smoot was promoted to lieutenant commander on June 23, 1938. He remained there for a year and completed torpedo instruction, qualifying him for command of a destroyer. Smoot then assumed command of destroyer Aulick, which was just activated from the Reserve Fleet and operated her within the patrols with the Atlantic Fleet.

== World War II ==
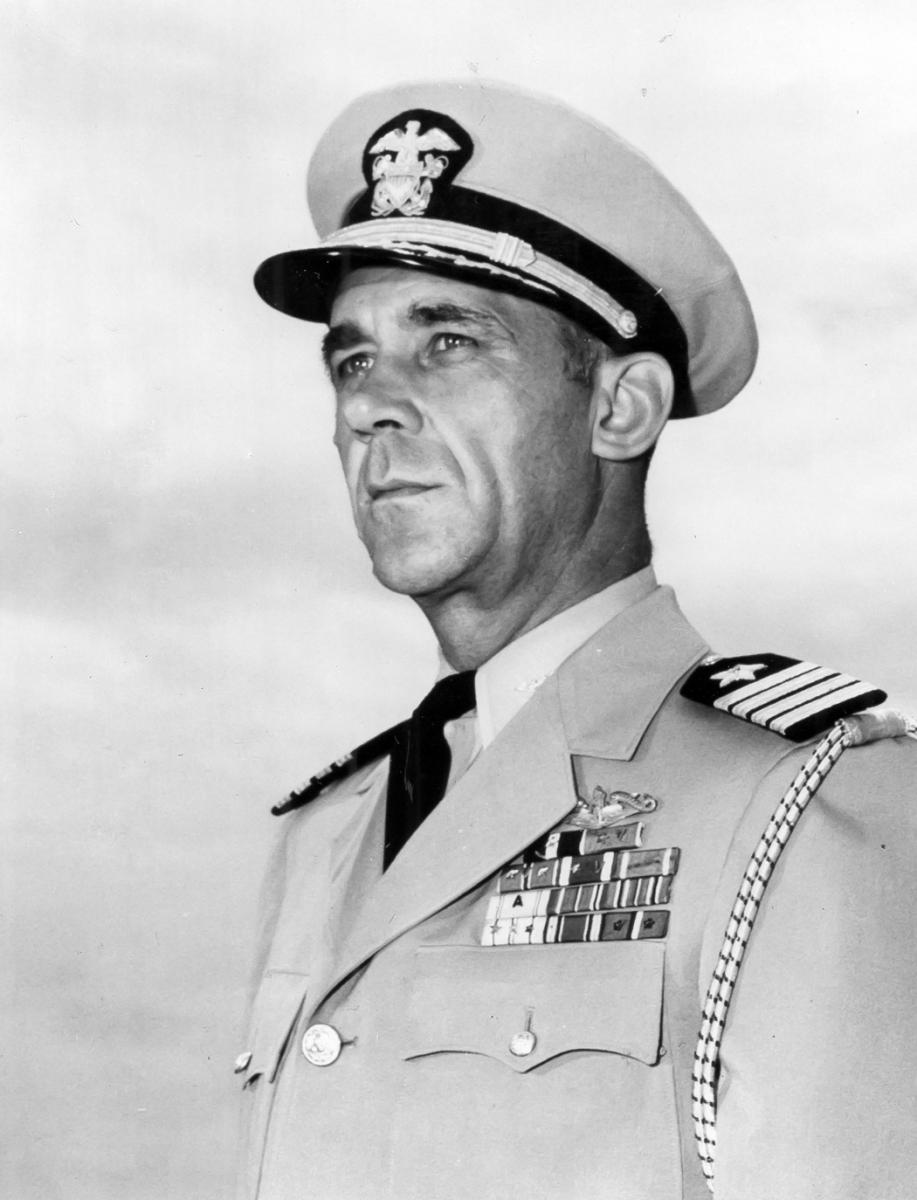
Smoot as Captain.

In March 1941, Smoot was ordered to the Puget Sound Navy Yard at Bremerton, Washington, and assumed duty in connection with fitting out of destroyer Monssen. Upon her commissioning on March 14, Smoot embarked for her shakedown and training, which he completed by the end of June 1941. The Monssen then joined the Atlantic Fleet and participated in the convoy escort duties and Neutrality Patrols to Iceland.

Following the United States entry into World War II, Smoot commanded her in Atlantic until February 1942, when Monssen was transferred to the Pacific Theater. Smoot led his destroyer as the part of escort for aircraft carrier Hornet during the Doolittle Raid on Tokyo on April 18, 1942, and after brief stay at Pearl Harbor, Hawaii, he embarked for Midway Atoll. He was decorated with Navy Commendation Medal with Combat "V" for his service in early stage of the War.

During the Japanese assault on advanced base on Midway, Monssen took part in the defense actions on June 4–7, 1942 and returned to Pearl Harbor for rest and refit, which took over a month. Smoot then sailed with Monnsen for the Japanese held Solomon Islands and provided cover during the Marine landings on Guadalcanal and Tulagi on August 7. The Monssen remained in the immediate area through the Battle of the Eastern Solomons, which prevented Japanese reinforcements from reaching Guadalcanal. For his service in the Solomons, Smoot was decorated with Bronze Star Medal with Combat "V". He was promoted to commander on June 30, 1942.

The Monssen then took up duties patrolling the sea routes to Guadalcanal and Smoot distinguished himself again on October 1, 1942, when one of the cargo ships, Alhena was struck by Japanese torpedo and a fire broke out. Smoot drove off the attacking Japanese submarine, removed the wounded from the sinking vessel and took Alhena in tow. The Monssen was relieved by the tugboat Navajo next day, but Alhena was saved. For his service during the salvaging of Alhena, Smoot received his second Bronze Star Medal.

Smoot was relieved by Charles E. McCombs by the end of October 1942 and ordered back to the United States for new assignment. He was sent to San Diego, California, where he assumed command of West Coast Sound School. While in this capacity, Smoot was responsible for the training of Sonar operators, serving on the Navy ships until early 1944 and received his second Navy Commendation Medal. While in this capacity, he was promoted to the temporary rank of captain on May 1, 1943.

He was subsequently ordered back to the Pacific theater and assumed command of Destroyer Squadron 14, operating off the Marshall Islands against bypassed Japanese-held positions until summer 1944. Smoot was transferred to command of Destroyer Squadron 56 in October 1944 and led a force of nine Fletcher-class destroyers during the Battle of Leyte Gulf. He distinguished himself in action against enemy Japanese forces at Surigao Strait off the Philippine Islands on the night of October 24–25, 1944. Leading his ships in a night attack on the enemy battle-line and despite heavy kamikaze attacks, Smoot's destroyers participated in the sinking of Japanese battleship Yamashiro. For his part in the battle, Smoot was decorated with the Navy Cross, the United States Navy second-highest decoration awarded for valor in combat.

In early February 1945, Smoot and his squadron covered minesweeping operations for three days prior to the landing on Iwo Jima. During the invasion, his destroyers engaged shore batteries and fired accurate bombardments of in assistance to troops ashore. One month later, Smoot's squadron covered underwater demolition and minesweeping operations as well as antiaircraft during the invasion on Okinawa and screened U.S. battleship during the shore bombardment. His flagship, destroyer Newcomb was hit by kamikaze and Smoot shifted his flag to destroyer Richard P. Leary. For his service during the Okinawa campaign, he received his second Navy Cross.

During July 1945, Smoot was promoted to the temporary rank of commodore and assumed duty as commander, Task Flotilla Four with cruiser San Diego as his flagship. His command screened allied aircraft carriers during the strikes on Japan and following the surrender of Japan, Smoot was present aboard the battleship Missouri during the formal ceremony on September 2, 1945. He also received two awards of Legion of Merit with Combat "V" for his service on Iwo Jima and Okinawa.

== Postwar service ==
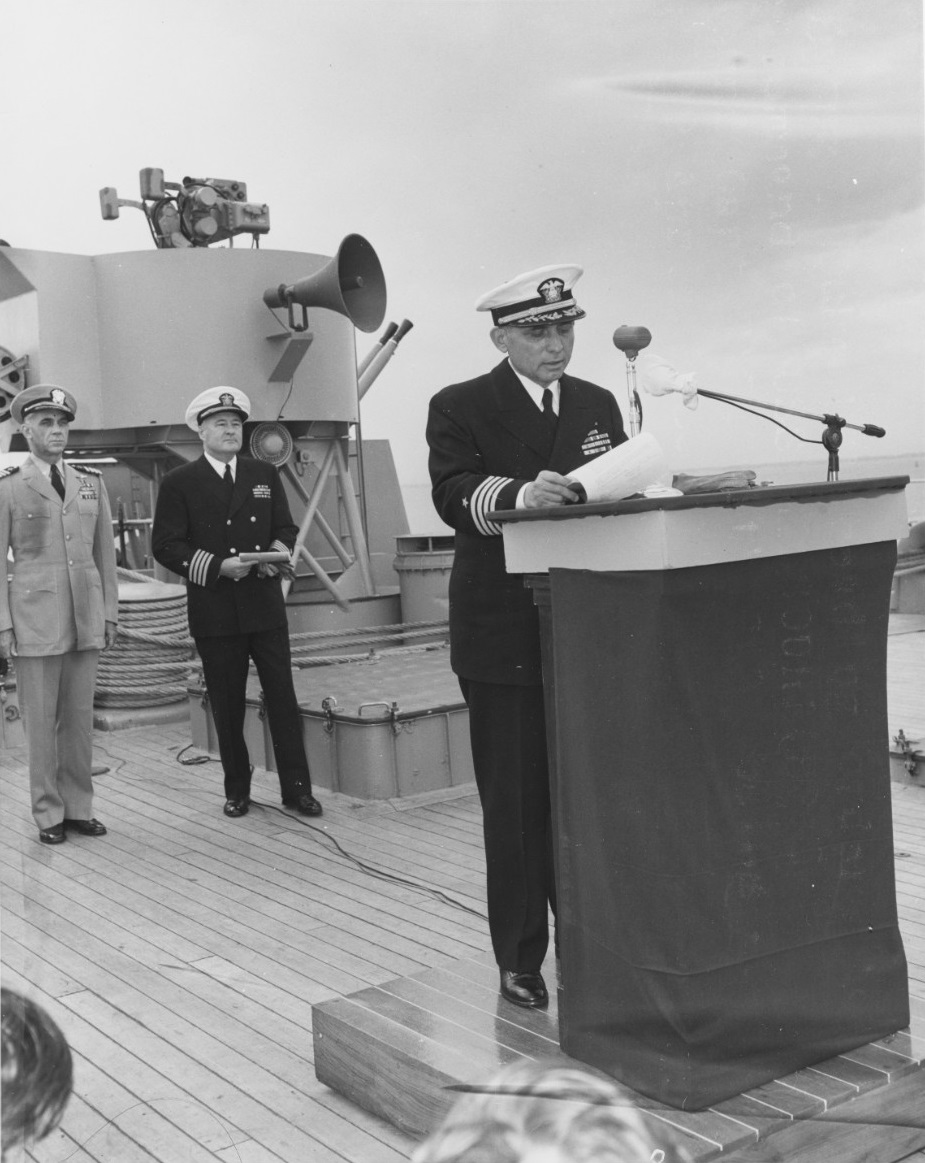
Smoot (left) supervising the change of command ceremony aboard Missouri on April 19, 1950.

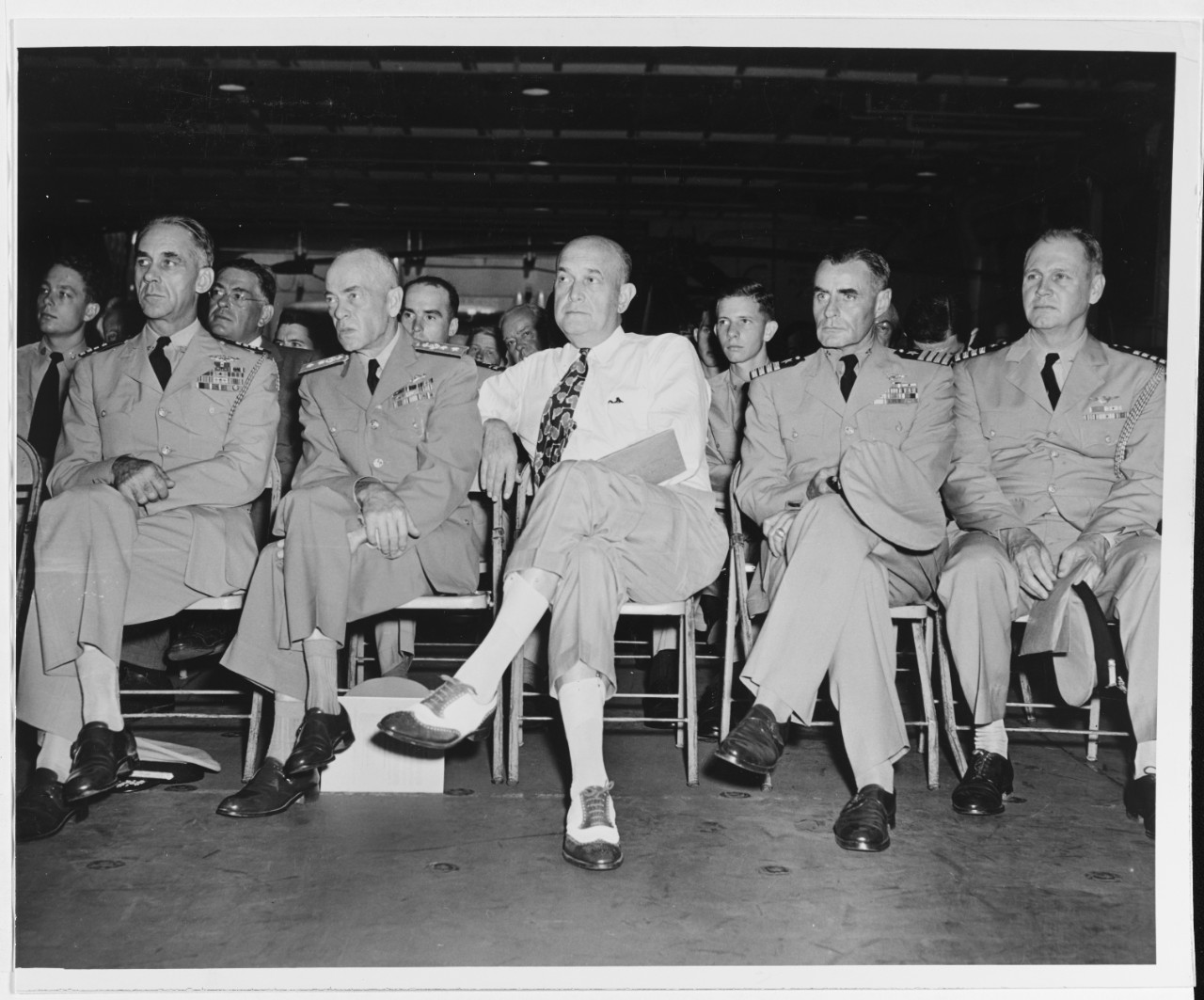
Smoot (left) with Secretary of Defense Louis A. Johnson (center) and other naval officers during briefing in 1949.

Smoot was ordered to Yokosuka in September 1945 and assumed duty as Port Director of local naval base. He remained in that capacity until November, when he reverted to his permanent rank of captain and was ordered back to the United States. Smoot reported to the Bureau of Naval Personnel in Washington, D.C., and was appointed director of officer personnel under Rear admiral Louis E. Denfeld.

After three years in that capacity, Smoot was transferred to Norfolk Navy Yard, Virginia, and assumed duty as chief of staff to the commander, Battleship Division One, Rear Admiral Heber H. McLean. He participated in the midshipmen and Naval Reserve cruise with Naval Forces in the Eastern Atlantic and European Waters and received Military Order of Saint Benedict of Aviz during the official ship's visit to Portugal.

By the end of 1948, Smoot was ordered to the Newport News Shipbuilding and Dry Dock Company in Newport News, Virginia, for duty in connection with fitting out of heavy cruiser of the same name, Newport News. Upon the commissioning of the ship on January 29, 1949, he commanded her during the shakedown cruise to the Caribbean, visiting Guantanamo Bay, Cuba in June that year and then participated in the naval operations with the Atlantic Fleet.

Smoot was appointed chief of staff, commander, Battleship-Cruiser Force, Atlantic Fleet, in November 1949 and served in this capacity under Rear Admiral Allen E. Smith aboard Albany until July 1951, when he was transferred to Washington, D.C., for duty as Assistant Chief of Naval Personnel (Personnel Control). While in this capacity, Smoot was promoted to rear admiral.

He returned to sea in August 1953, when assumed duty as commander, Cruiser Division Three with cruiser Helena as his flagship and embarked for Far East. Smoot commanded his unit as the part of Task Force 77 on security patrol in the Sea of Japan shortly after the Korean Armistice Agreement was signed and returned to the United States in July 1954. He was subsequently appointed commander, Mine Force, Pacific Fleet with headquarters on Hawaii and returned to Washington, D.C., in mid-1955. Smoot then served as Deputy Chief of Naval Operations for Administration under his classmate, now-Admiral Arleigh A. Burke and was promoted to vice admiral in July 1958.

=== Taiwan Crisis ===
Upon his promotion, Smoot was ordered to Taipei, Formosa for duty as commander, Taiwan Defense Command. He assumed command just at the time of Matsu Crisis, when communist China's ships began shelling the islands of Kinmen (Quemoy) and the Matsu Islands along the east coast of mainland China (in the Taiwan Strait) to "liberate" Taiwan from the Chinese Nationalist Party (Kuomintang) under Generallisimo Chiang Kai-shek. During the conflict Smoot's ships provided escort for supply convoys destined for Kinmen and the Matsu Islands and he was decorated with the Order of the Sacred Tripod by Chiang Kai-shek.

Smoot remained on Taiwan and was responsible for the defense of that country, training of the Republic of China Navy and also served as Senior U.S. Military Advisor to Chiang Kai-shek until May 1962, when he was relieved by vice admiral Charles L. Melson. For his service on Taiwan, Smoot was decorated with the Navy Distinguished Service Medal and also received the Order of the Cloud and Banner by Chiang Kai-shek. He was also made an honorary citizen of Taipei.

== Retirement ==
Following his retirement from the Navy on June 1, 1962, Smoot assumed job as Executive Director of the Anti-Communism Voters League and later became the President of an Oil Drilling firm and also president of Leisure World's home owner association in Seal Beach, California, and a board member (Council of Regents) of Forest Lawn Memorial-Parks, Glendale, California.

Vice Admiral Roland N. Smoot died on February 13, 1984, aged 82, in Seal Beach, California, and was buried at Forest Lawn Memorial Park in Glendale, California. His wife Sally Ridgely Smoot is buried beside him. They had one son, Roland N. Jr., who served with the United States Army in European Theater and a daughter, Sally Doone.

== Decorations ==
Here is the ribbon bar of Vice admiral Smoot:

Submarine Warfare insignia
1st Row	Navy Cross with one 5/16" Gold Star		Navy Distinguished Service Medal	Legion of Merit with Combat "V" and one 5/16" Gold Star
2nd Row	Bronze Star Medal with Combat "V" and two 5/16" Gold Stars	Navy Commendation Medal with Combat "V" and one 5/16" Gold Star	Navy Unit Commendation	American Defense Service Medal with "A" Device
3rd Row	European-African-Middle Eastern Campaign Medal	American Campaign Medal	Asiatic–Pacific Campaign Medal with two silver and one bronze 3/16 inch service stars	World War II Victory Medal
4th Row	Navy Occupation Service Medal	National Defense Service Medal with one star	Korean Service Medal	Philippine Liberation Medal with two stars
5th Row	Military Order of Saint Benedict of Aviz, rank Officer (Portugal)	Order of the Cloud and Banner, Grand Cordon (Republic of China)	Order of the Cloud and Banner, 4th Class (Republic of China)	United Nations Korean Medal
