= USS Newport News (CA-148) =

Des Moines-class heavy cruiser of the United States Navy

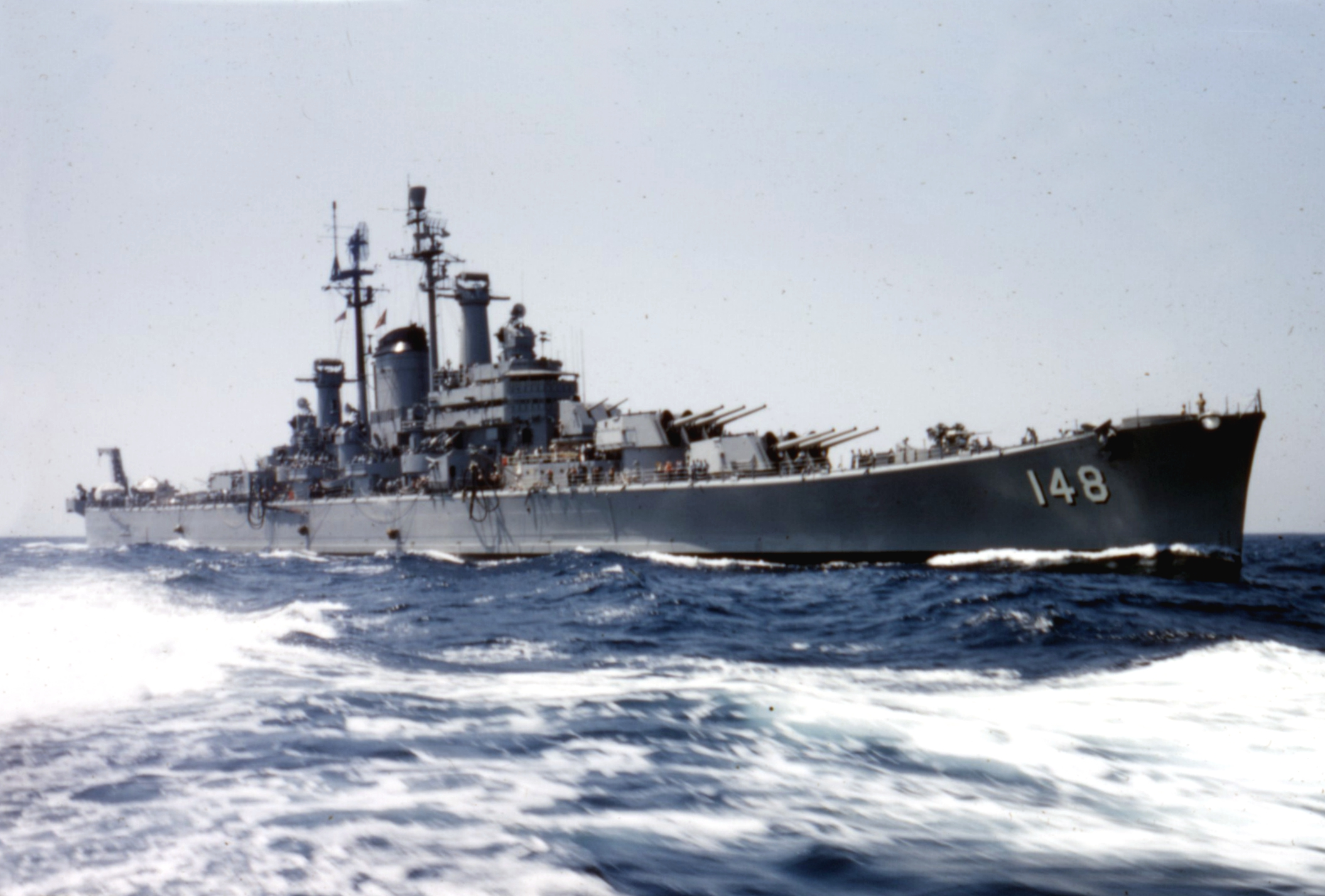
- USS Newport News underway in the Mediterranean Sea on 9 September 1957

History

United States
- Name: Newport News
- Namesake: Newport News
- Builder: Newport News Shipbuilding and Dry Dock Company
- Laid down: 1 November 1945
- Launched: 6 March 1948
- Sponsored by: Eliza S. Ferguson
- Commissioned: 29 January 1949
- Decommissioned: 27 June 1975
- Stricken: 31 July 1978
- Identification: Callsign: NIQQ; Hull number: CA-148
- Honours and awards: See Awards
- Fate: Scrapped, 25 February 1993
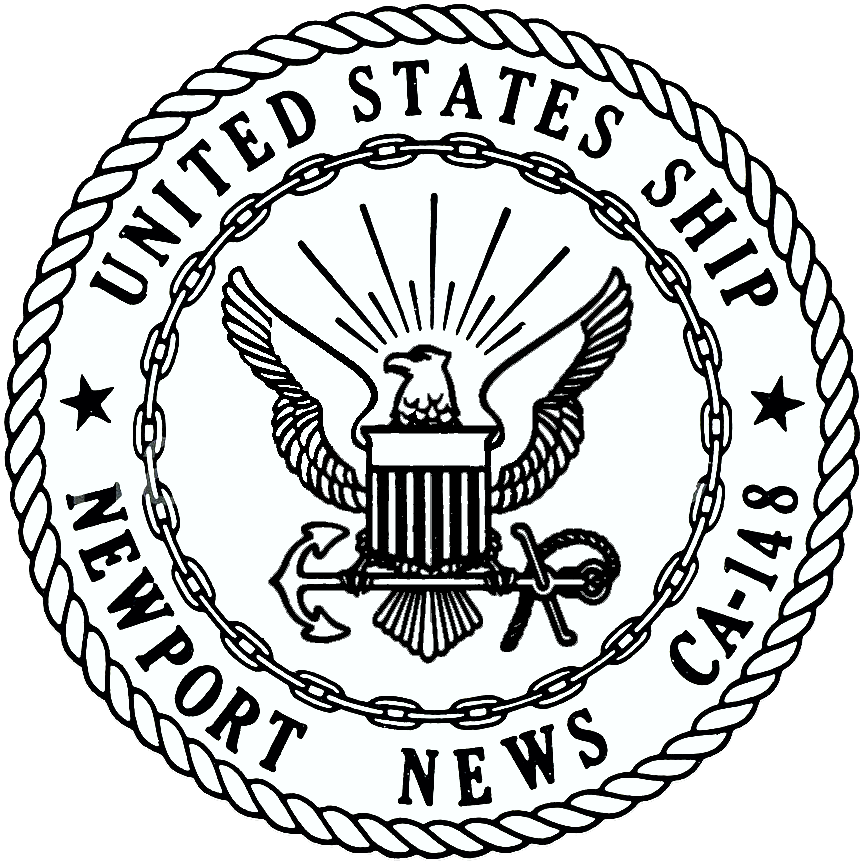
- Badge

General characteristics
- Class & type: Des Moines-class heavy cruiser
- Displacement: 17,255 long tons (17,532 t) (standard); 20,980 long tons (21,320 t) (full load)
- Length: 700 ft (210 m) wl; 716 ft 6 in (218.39 m) oa
- Beam: 76 ft 6 in (23.32 m)
- Draft: 22 ft (6.7 m)
- Propulsion: 4 shafts; General Electric turbines; 4 boilers; 120,000 shp (89,000 kW)
- Speed: 33 kn (61 km/h)
- Range: 10,500 nmi at 15 knots; 19,400 km at 28 km/h
- Boats & landing craft carried: 2–4 × lifeboats
- Complement: 1,799 officers and enlisted
- Sensors & processing systems: AN/SPS-6 air-search radar; AN/SPS-8A height-finding radar; AN/SPS-29 early-warning radar; AN/URN-3 TACAN; AN/URD-4 radio direction finder
- Armament: 3 × triple 8"/55 caliber guns; 6 × twin 5"/38 caliber guns; 12 × twin 3"/50 caliber guns; 12 × single Oerlikon 20 mm cannons
- Armor: Belt: 4–6 in (102–152 mm); Deck: 3.5 in (89 mm); Turrets: 2–8 in (51–203 mm); Barbettes: 6.3 in (160 mm); Conning tower: 6.5 in (165 mm)
- Aviation facilities: 2 × aircraft catapults; Helipad (later conversion)

USS Newport News (CA–148) was the third and last ship of the Des Moines-class of heavy cruisers in the United States Navy. She was the first fully air-conditioned surface ship and the last active all-gun heavy cruiser in the United States Navy.

== Construction and career ==
Newport News was laid down 1 November 1945, launched on 6 March 1948 by Newport News Shipbuilding and Dry Dock Company, Newport News, Virginia, sponsored by Eliza S. Ferguson and commissioned on 29 January 1949, with Captain Roland N. Smoot in command.

=== 1950–1962 ===
In addition to annual deployments to the Mediterranean from 1950 to 1961 for duty with the Sixth Fleet, she participated in major fleet exercises and midshipman training cruises in the Caribbean and Western Atlantic.

On 4 January 1956 she steamed for a tour of duty in the Mediterranean as the flagship of Vice Admiral Ralph A. Ofstie, Commander Sixth Fleet. Vice Admiral Ofstie was relieved on board by Vice Admiral Harry Donald Felt on 12 April in Barcelona, Spain. Commander Sixth Fleet transferred his flag to USS Salem on 21 May at Gibraltar. The ship returned to Norfolk, Virginia on 29 May 1956. The ship visited the city of Newport News over the Fourth of July holiday, leaving Norfolk on 2 July and returning on 5 July. During the trip from Norfolk to Newport News, 250 dependents took part in the ship's first dependents' cruise. From 16 July to 24 August, she participated in Midshipman Cruise Charlie as flagship of Commander Cruiser Division TWO. Visits were made at New Orleans, Louisiana, Balboa, Canal Zone, and Guantanamo Bay. While transiting the Panama Canal, Rear Admiral Ira H. Nunn relieved Rear Admiral E. R. McLean, Jr. as Commander Cruiser Division TWO. On 19 September she entered the Norfolk Naval Shipyard for overhaul, remaining at Norfolk through December 1956. Commander Cruiser Division TWO transferred his flag to USS Des Moines on 20 September and his staff returned aboard on 1 November 1956.

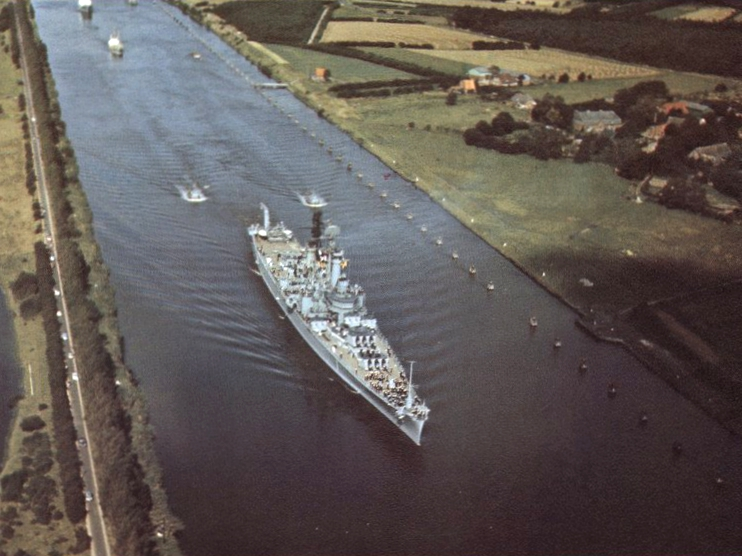
Newport News transiting the Kiel Canal in September 1962

In early September 1957, Newport News was on station in the Eastern Mediterranean in preparation for any contingency during the Syrian crisis. In March 1960, while steaming 75 miles northeast of Sicily, Newport News was ordered to proceed to Agadir, Morocco, to render assistance to the survivors of the 1960 earthquake. She steamed 1,225 miles in 40.5 hours at an average speed of 31 knots, arriving on 3 March to provide medical and material aid. After the assassination of General Rafael Trujillo and the resulting instability in Santo Domingo, Newport News was underway on short notice on 4 June 1961, and proceeded to a station in international waters off the Dominican Republic to await further orders. When the crisis terminated, the ship conducted training exercises off Puerto Rico before returning to Norfolk.

Newport News' berthing and communications facilities were modified in the winter of 1962 to accommodate Commander United States Second Fleet and his staff. In August 1962, she participated in NATO Exercise RIPTIDE III, and upon the end of the exercise, made a month-long tour of Northern European ports as flagship of the Commander Striking Fleet Atlantic (COMSTRIKFLTLANT), the NATO role of the Commander of the Second Fleet.

Within a month after return to Norfolk, Newport News was underway on 22 October as the flagship of the Atlantic Fleet for the Cuban Missile Crisis, with USS Leary as her destroyer escort. The two ships stopped the Soviet vessel Labinsk and ordered her away from Cuban waters. For the next month, acting as flagship for ComSecondFlt, Newport News was on station northeast of Cuba. When the Soviet MRBMs were dismantled and removed from Cuba, Newport News assisted in the missile count. Upon cancellation of the quarantine, she returned to her homeport of Norfolk the day before Thanksgiving.

=== 1963–1974 ===
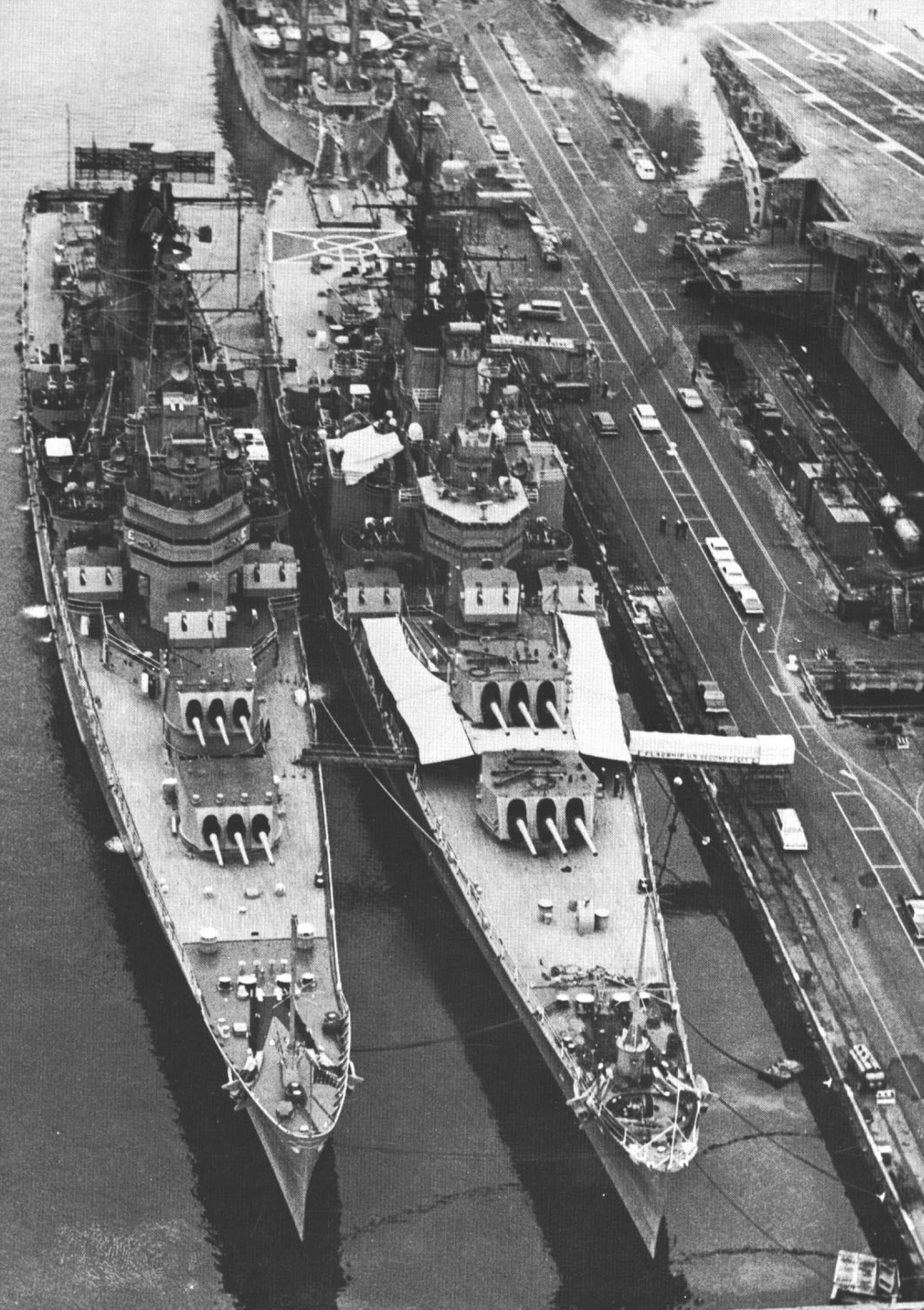
Newport News (right) alongside the guided missile cruiser Boston at Norfolk in 1966; Note that despite the Des Moines-class being largely based on the Baltimore-class, the Newport News is larger than the Boston

Operations from 1963 through 1967 consisted primarily of NATO exercises in the North Atlantic, gunnery and amphibious exercises off the Eastern seaboard and Caribbean, and midshipman training cruises. When the Dominican Republic crisis of 1965 developed, Newport News sortied from Norfolk on 29 April for Santo Domingo, where she was flagship for Commander Joint Task Force 122. Newport News remained on station off Santo Domingo until 7 May 1965 when JTF 122 was dissolved, and command was shifted to the Army ashore in the Dominican Republic. She returned to Norfolk, where in June alterations were made to increase her combat capabilities. On 28 June 1965, Newport News entered the Norfolk Naval Shipyard, Norfolk, Virginia for a five-month period of refitting and overhaul. Shakedown was in Guantanamo, Cuba, over Christmas and New Year of 1965. Upon her return from Gitmo, she again became Flagship for Second Fleet, with Vice Admiral Masterson taking command.

1 September 1967, Commander Second Fleet shifted his flag to the light cruiser Springfield, and Newport News departed Norfolk 5 September for a six-month deployment to Southeast Asia.

Arriving Da Nang, South Vietnam, on the morning of 9 October, she became the flagship of ComCruDesFlot 3. That night, at 2300, she fired her eight-inch guns for the first time in anger against shore targets in North Vietnam as part of Operation Sea Dragon.

Newport News spent 50 days patrolling the coast of North Vietnam as part of Operation Sea Dragon – the Navy's effort to destroy waterborne logistics craft, military supply routes and installations in North Vietnam. During this period, the ship conducted 156 strikes with 325 North Vietnamese coastal defense sites taken under fire. According to spotters, Newport News sank 17 waterborne logistics craft, damaged another 14 and destroyed several enemy bunkers and radar sites, bridges, barges, trucks and roads. The ship was subjected to return fire on several occasions, but each time countered enemy batteries. On 19 December 1967, Newport News exchanged fire with 20–28 separate shore batteries, simultaneously, off the coast of North Vietnam. During this engagement, over 300 enemy rounds bracketed the cruiser's position, but she suffered no direct hits. This encounter led to forward observers to nickname Newport News "The Gray Ghost from the East Coast," a moniker she retained throughout her three Vietnam deployments.

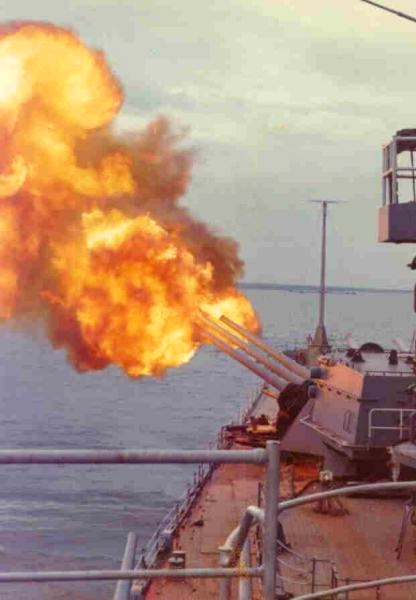
USS Newport News firing a broadside during her 1972 Vietnam deployment

Subsequent to the end of Operation Sea Dragon and for the remaining several months of this deployment, Newport News participated in Naval Gunfire Support operations near the DMZ. In support of Third Marine Division forces on the coastal area, firing around the clock for periods sometimes lasting several weeks.

During this deployment, Newport News expended 59,241 rounds of high-explosive ammunition, while conducting 239 observed and 602 unobserved missions. She came under fire of enemy coastal defense batteries on seventeen separate occasions, hit by shrapnel but never suffered a direct hit.

The cruiser departed Subic Bay on 21 April and arrived at her homeport of Norfolk, Virginia, on 13 May 1968, via the Panama Canal.

Following an extensive yard overhaul period to prepare her for further combat operations, on 21 November 1968 Newport News departed Norfolk to commence a second deployment to Vietnam. Combat operations during this tour commenced on 25 December 1968, focused on providing naval gunfire support to the ARVN in Vĩnh Bình Province and the DMZ. Newport News departed Da Nang on 3 June 1969, via San Francisco and the Panama Canal, to arrive at her homeport in Norfolk, Virginia, in early July.

In May 1972, Newport News returned for her third and final combat tour. Along with the guided missile cruisers USS Oklahoma City and USS Providence, as well as several screening destroyers, the ship took part in a high-speed night bombardment of Haiphong harbor known as Operation Custom Tailor. In June 1972, New York Times reporter Fox Butterfield, who was aboard the ship, detailed its role in Operation Linebacker. "Along with 64 other aircraft carriers, cruisers, destroyers and supply ships of the Seventh Fleet—the biggest armada organized since World War II, Navy officers say—the Newport News is part of Operation Linebacker, the Nixon Administration's air and naval campaign to prevent North Vietnamese supplies from getting to South Vietnam."

On 27 August 1972, Newport News, Providence, USS Robison and USS Rowan made a night raid into Haiphong Harbor shelling the port area from a distance of 2 miles (3.2 km). After leaving the harbor two Vietnam People's Navy torpedo boats engaged the ships 27 miles (43 km) southeast of Haiphong with one sunk by the Newport News and the other set on fire by the Rowan and then sunk by a Navy A-7 jet.

At 1 a.m. on 1 October 1972, while in action off the DMZ, Newport News sustained an in-bore explosion in her center 8-inch gun of number two turret. A defective auxiliary detonating fuze caused the projectile to detonate almost immediately upon firing. A total of 20 sailors were killed and another 36 suffered serious injuries from toxic gas inhalation. The barrel proper was blown forward from the gun. After making its way to Subic Bay in the Philippines, the ship was out of commission for several weeks as its damaged gun was removed and its port plated over. The explosion had caused extensive damage to the center gun mount. It was proposed to replace the damaged mount with one from sister ships Des Moines or Salem, both of which had been decommissioned, but this was rejected as being too expensive. As a result, the damage was not repaired and the turret was simply closed off for the remainder of the ship's career.

Operations near Vietnam resumed 21 October and continued until December 1972 when the ship was recalled to Norfolk. During 1973 and 1974 the ship undertook training cruises and visited many ports around the world before being recalled for decommissioning. While there was some interest in retaining her "big-gun" capability in the fleet, a survey to determine further service indicated the ship was beyond economical refitting.

Modifications

Newport News underwent several refits which changed her appearance and increased her capabilities. During the mid-1950s her forward bridge was enclosed on both levels with roofs and glass windows creating a navigation bridge above, and a flag bridge below. Later in the 1950s more capable radars for navigation and gunnery were fitted. The biggest change for her came in 1962 when a large deckhouse was added midships which gave her enhanced flagship accommodation and office spaces. This would result in her becoming the United States Second Fleet flagship for most of the rest of her career, save for her gunfire support stints during the Vietnam War.

=== Decommissioning ===
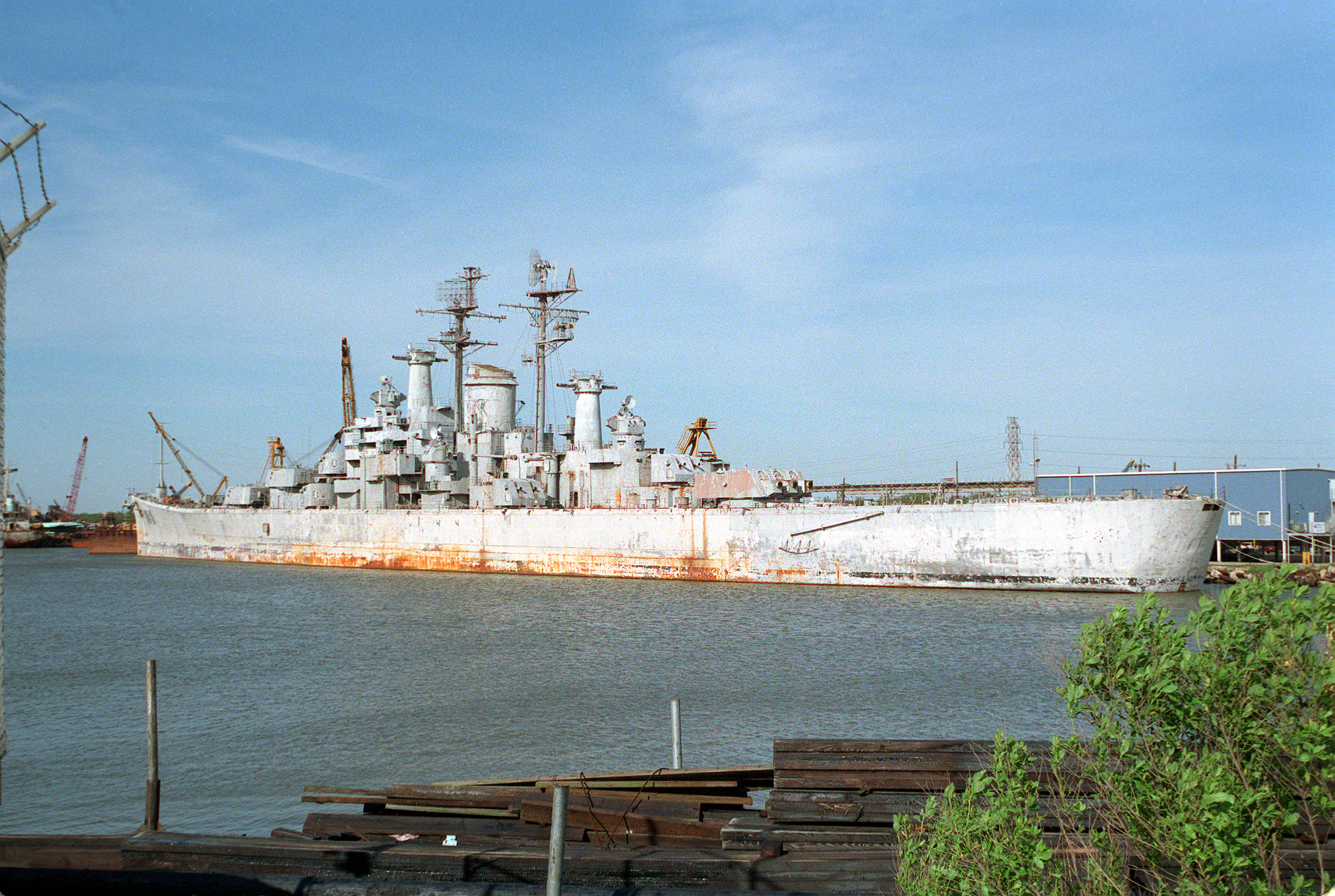
Newport News laid up in New Orleans shortly before being scrapped, 1993

Newport News was decommissioned on 27 June 1975 and stricken from the Naval Vessel Register on 31 July 1978. She spent her later years as a member of the Philadelphia Naval Shipyard's Mothball Fleet and was sold for scrap in New Orleans, Louisiana, on 25 February 1993. The museum ship, USS Salem in Quincy, Massachusetts contains her bell and other items dedicated to Newport News and her crew.

In the Hampton Roads Naval Museum's The Ten Thousand-Day War at Sea: The U.S. Navy in Vietnam, 1950–1975 section of the museum, a large model of Newport News in her Vietnam configuration is displayed.

== Gallery ==
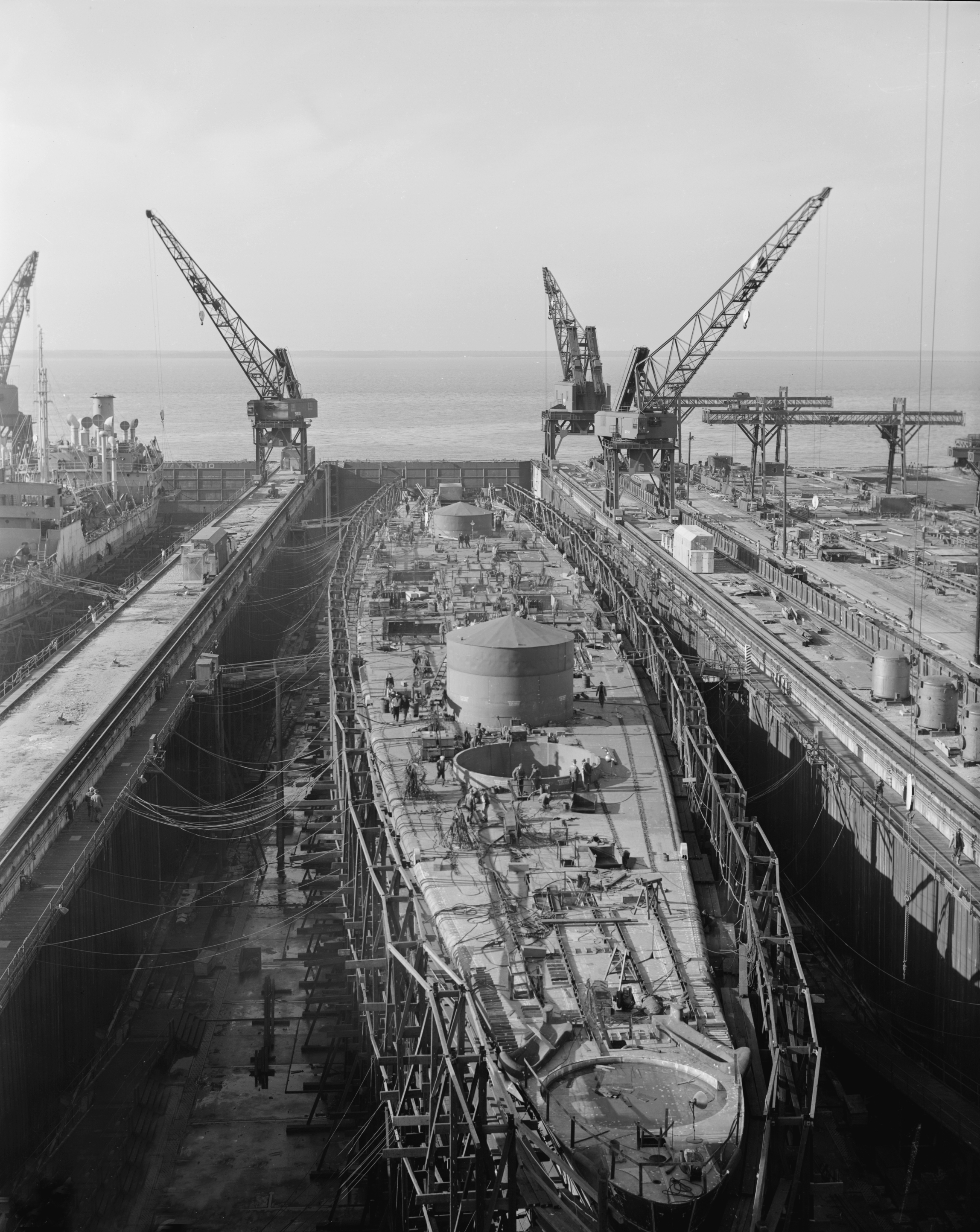
USS Newport News under construction in January 1947.

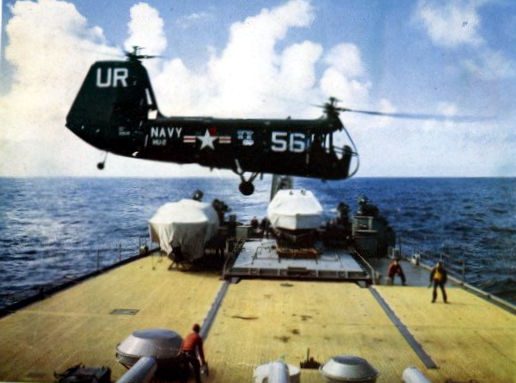
HUP of HU-2 takes off from USS Newport News in 1955.

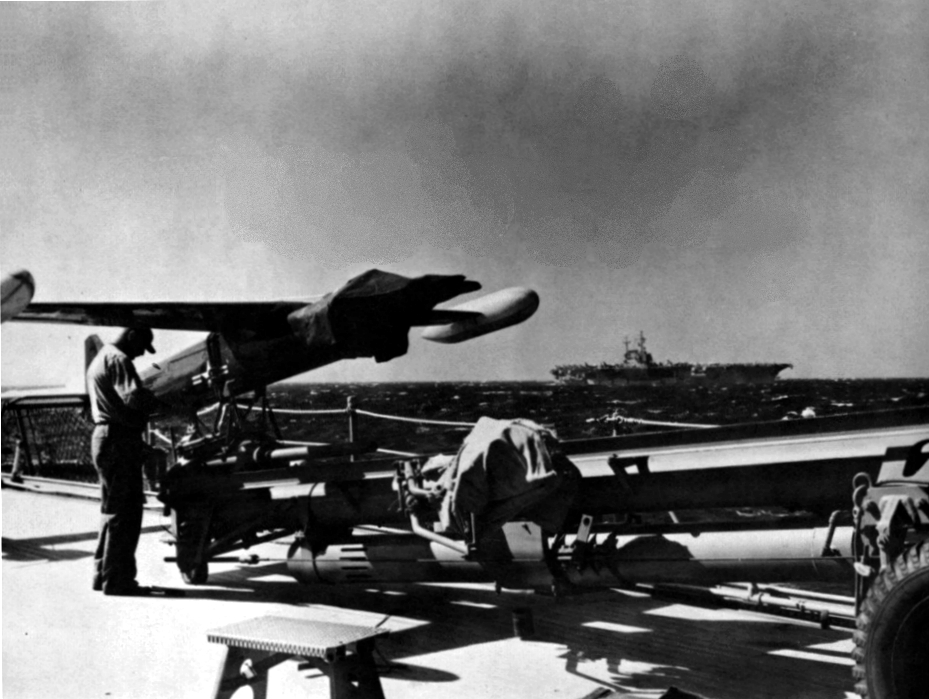
KD2R Drone on USS Newport News in 1960.

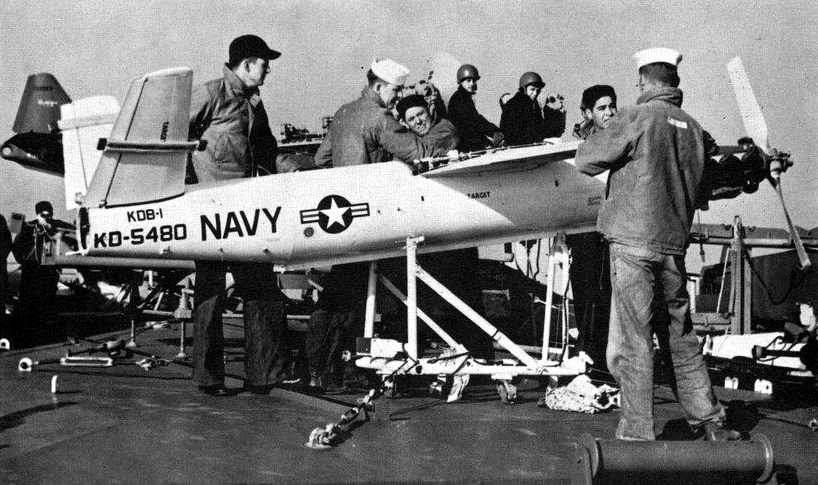
Target Drones aboard USS Newport News in 1960.

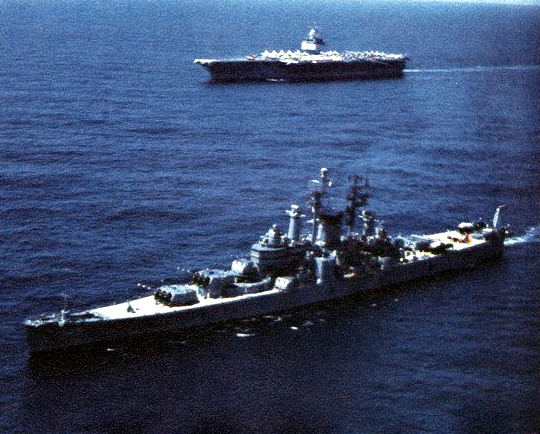
USS Newport News alongside USS Enterprise (CVAN-65) In 1962.

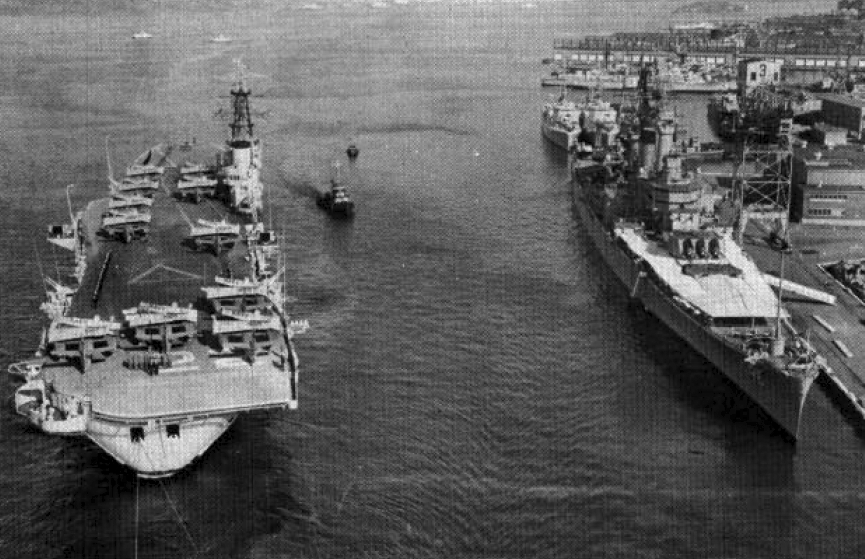
USS Newport News and HMCS Bonaventure (CVL-22) at Halifax in 1962.

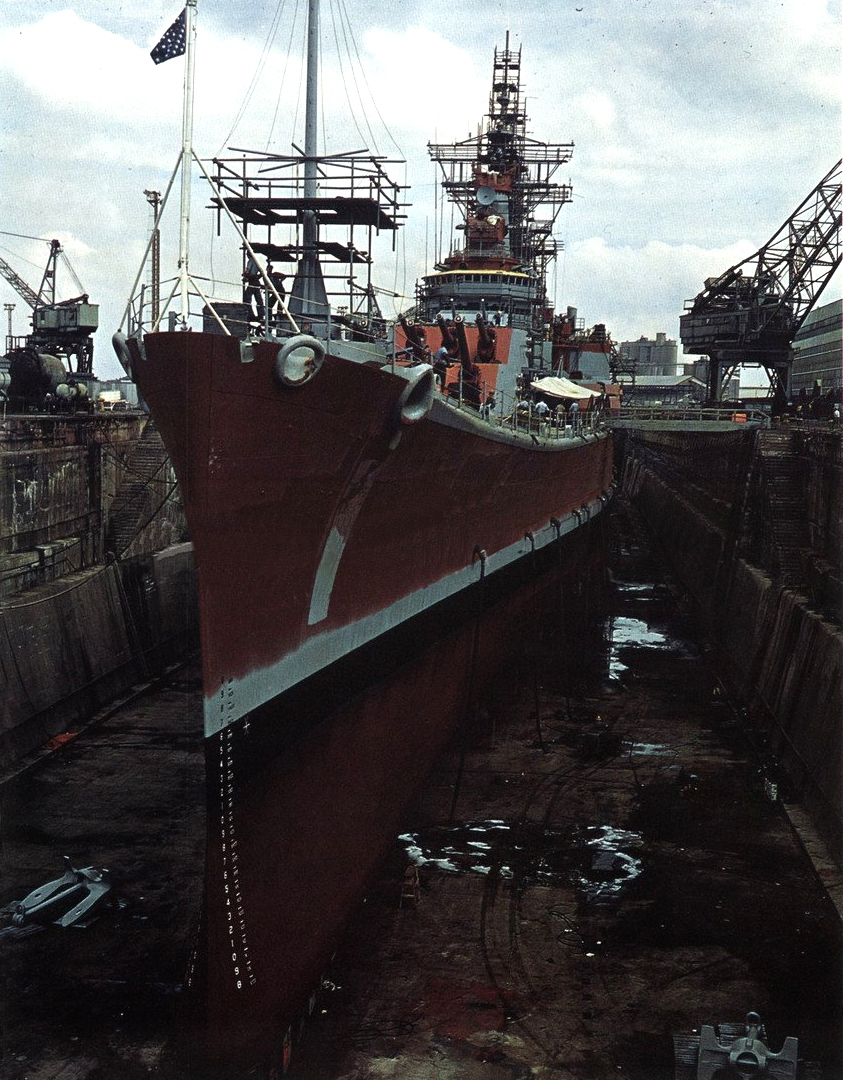
USS Newport News at Norfolk Navy Yard in 1965.

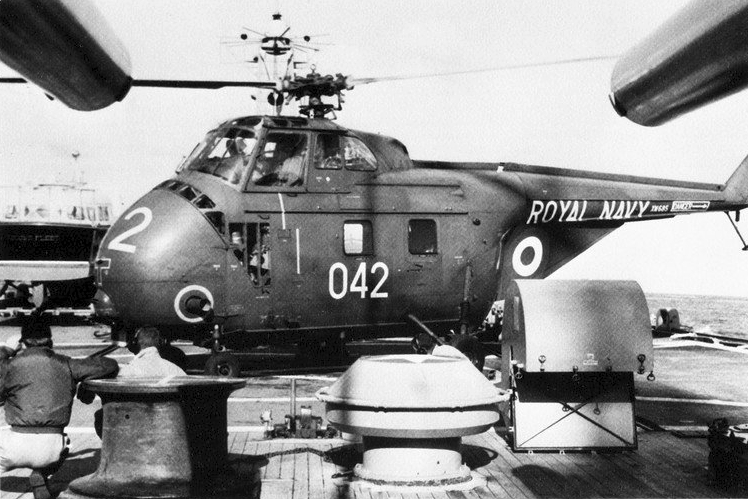
Westland Whirlwind on USS Newport News in 1966.

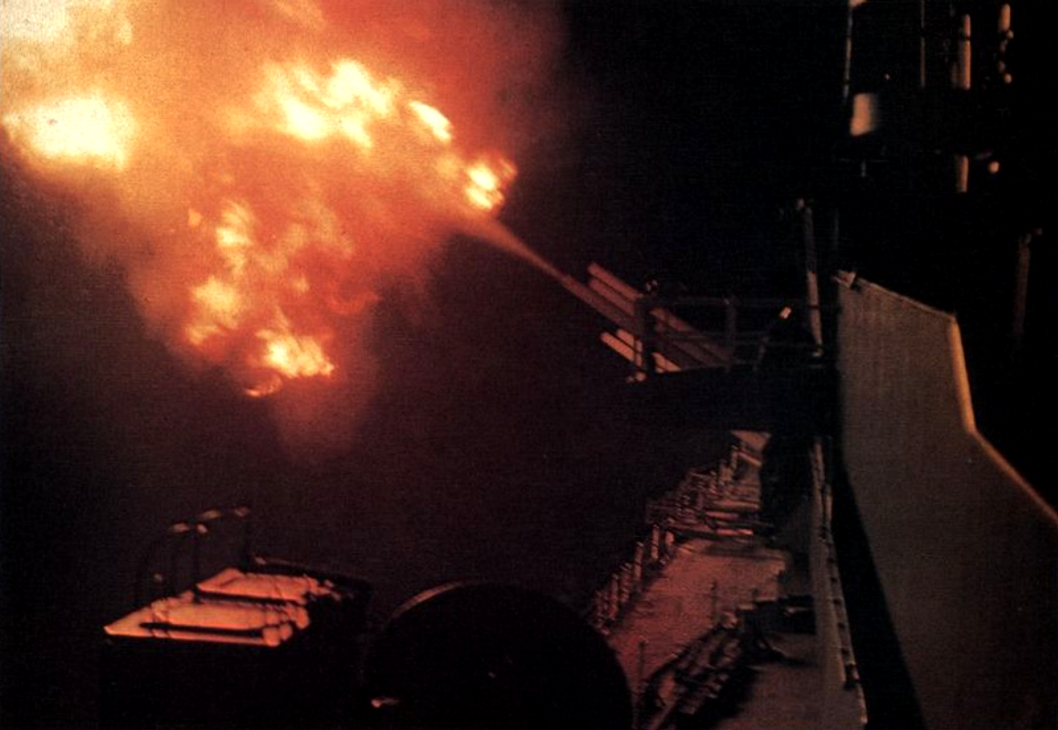
USS Newport News firing on North Vietnamese positions at night in 1967.

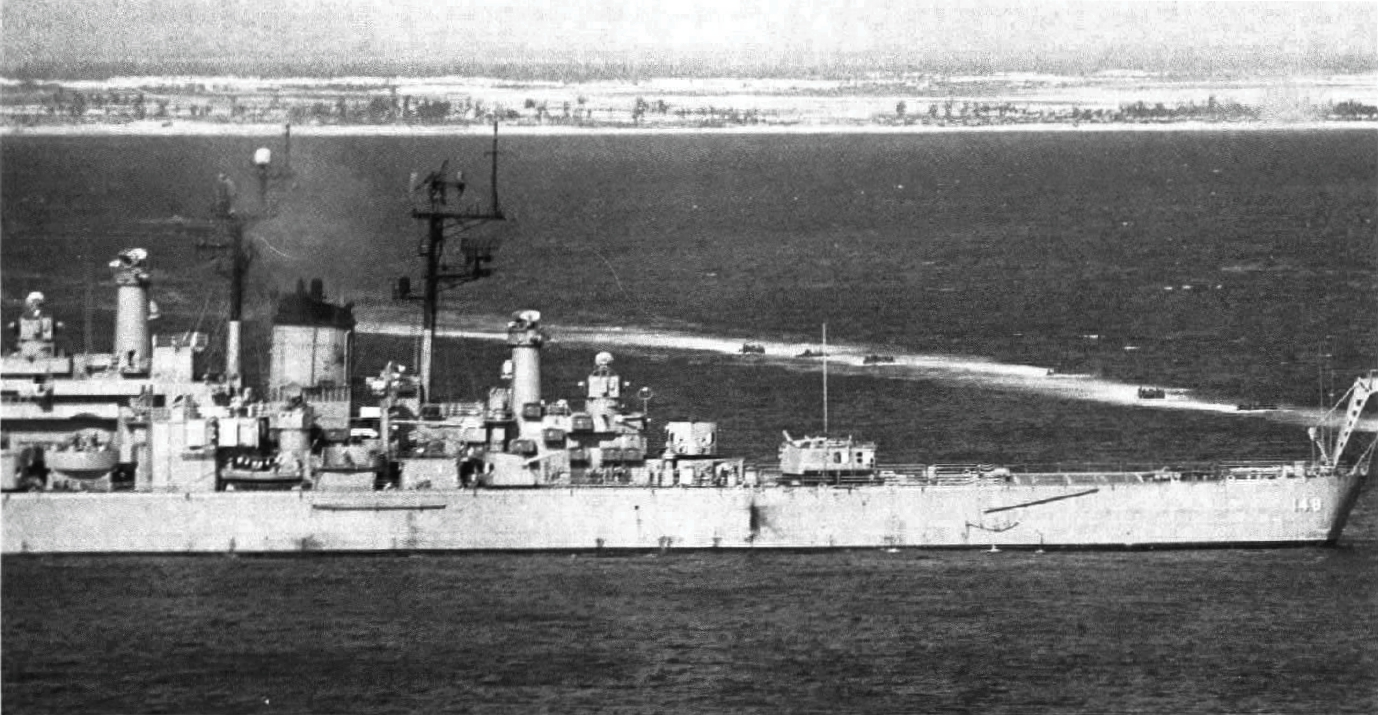
USS Newport News firing on North Vietnamese positions during the Vietnam War in May 1972.

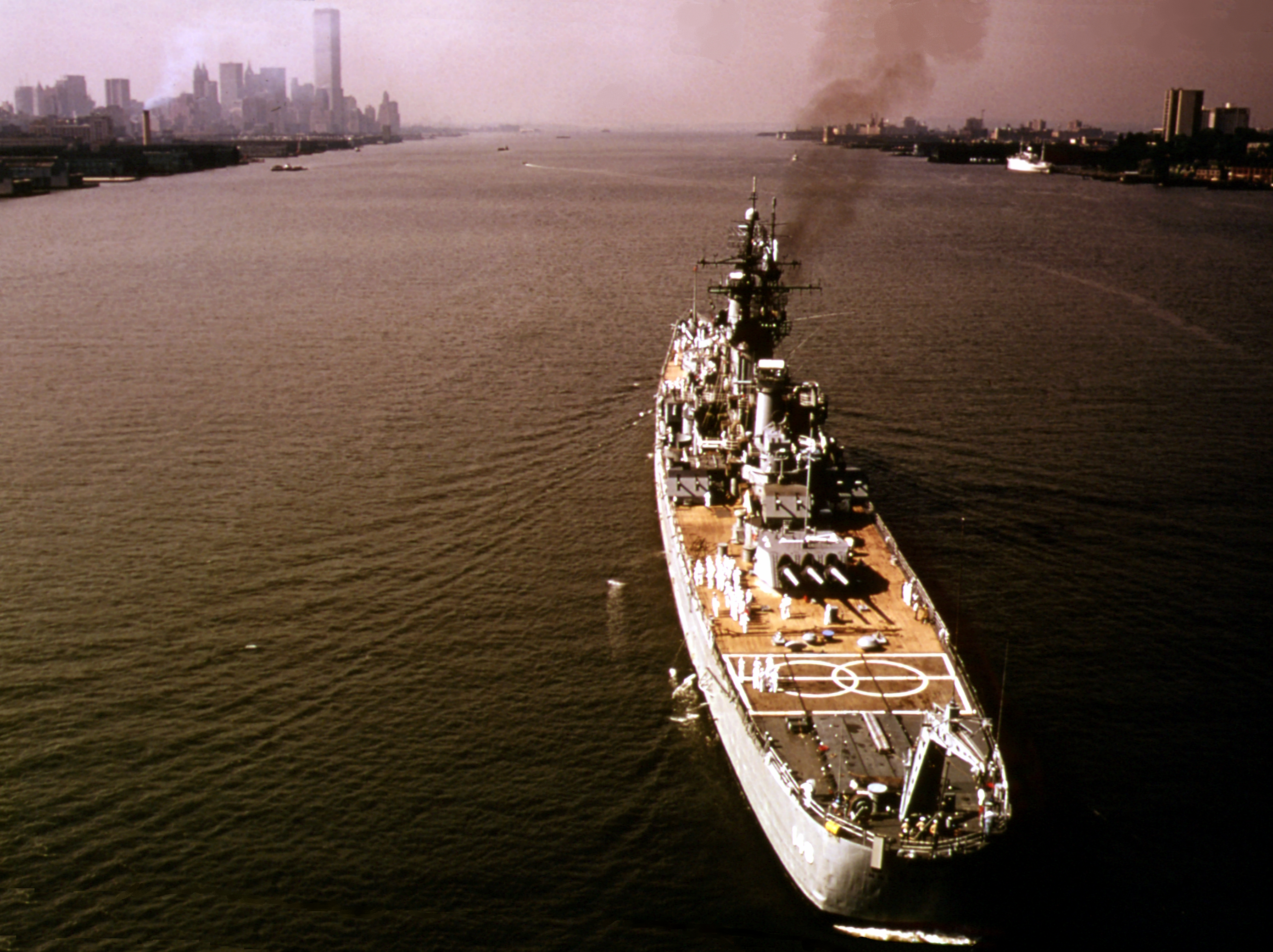
USS Newport News on Hudson River in 1974.

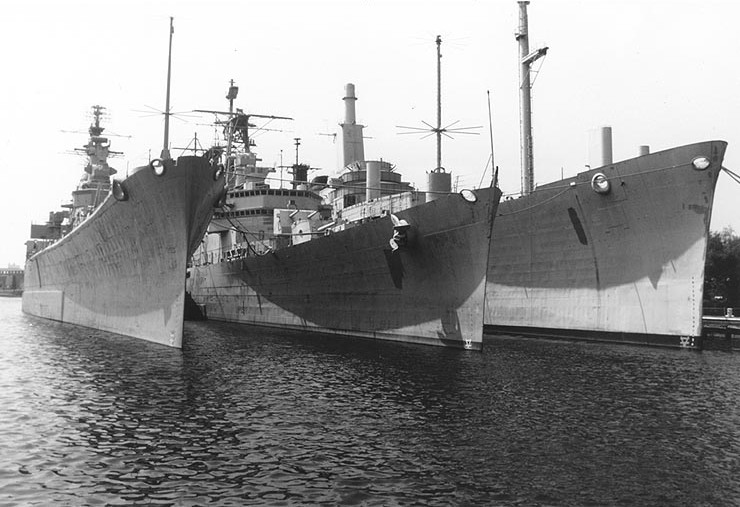
USS Newport News, USS Springfield (CG-7) and USS Northampton (CC-1) await disposal at Philadelphia Naval Shipyard in October 1978.

== Awards ==
- Combat Action Ribbon
- Navy Unit Commendation with star in lieu of 2nd award
- Meritorious Unit Commendation
- Navy E Ribbon
- Navy Occupation Medal with "Europe" clasp
- National Defense Service Medal with star
- Armed Forces Expeditionary Medal
- Vietnam Service Medal with three campaign stars
- Republic of Vietnam Campaign Medal
- On 4 July weekend 1968, Newport News was awarded its first Navy Unit Commendation, presented to Captain Snyder by Rear Admiral John Wadleigh on behalf of the Secretary of the Navy "for Exceptionally meritorious service from 2OCT67 to 26APR68 while engaged in operations against enemy aggressor forces in the waters contiguous to the hostile coastline of both North and South Vietnam."
- The ship was awarded the "Top Gun" award for support of the allied forces during the 1969 deployment.
- In 1969, Newport News was awarded the Navy Meritorious Unit Commendation for performance during operations against hostile enemy forces during the ship's second deployment to Vietnam during 1968 and 1969.
- Newport News received the Battle Efficiency "E" for CIC/Operations for Fiscal Year 1972. The occasion marked the 24th commissioning anniversary of Newport News. COMSECONDFLT VADM Finneran was guest speaker at the ceremony. (Twenty-nine January is the official anniversary of Newport News.)
- On 13 July 1973 Newport News was awarded its second Navy Unit Commendation, presented to Capt Kelly by VADM Finneran on behalf of Secretary of the Navy John W. Warner at a ceremony which was also attended by Capt Zartman, who had been Commanding Officer for the 1972 Vietnam deployment, during which the award was earned.

== Museum and Memorial Foundation ==
In June 2000, three sailors from the USS Newport News visited the USS Salem, the sister ship of the News which is preserved as a museum ship. Discussions began on providing the USS Newport News shipmates space to set up a display and museum of the News. In July 2000, an agreement was reached between the USS Salem Museum and the USS Newport News Museum and Memorial Foundation. Donations of items, memorabilia, audio/visual material, and more began to flow in. Between 2000 and 2002, multiple work parties were held to get the museum displays organized, installed, and arranged. In 2001, the USS Newport News Museum and Memorial Foundation were able to secure a mooring bit that was preserved from the News, as well as the memorial plaque honoring the fallen shipmates who perished in the October 1972 turret explosion. In 2002, the foundation also secured the ship's bell from the Mariners Museum in Newport News, VA. Also in 2002, the Foundation organized a working party to restore Turret 2 on the USS Salem and dedicated it to the Newport News sailors who perished in the explosion. Decades of congealed hydraulic fluid were removed, brass polished, and paint applied.
