= William T. Glassell =

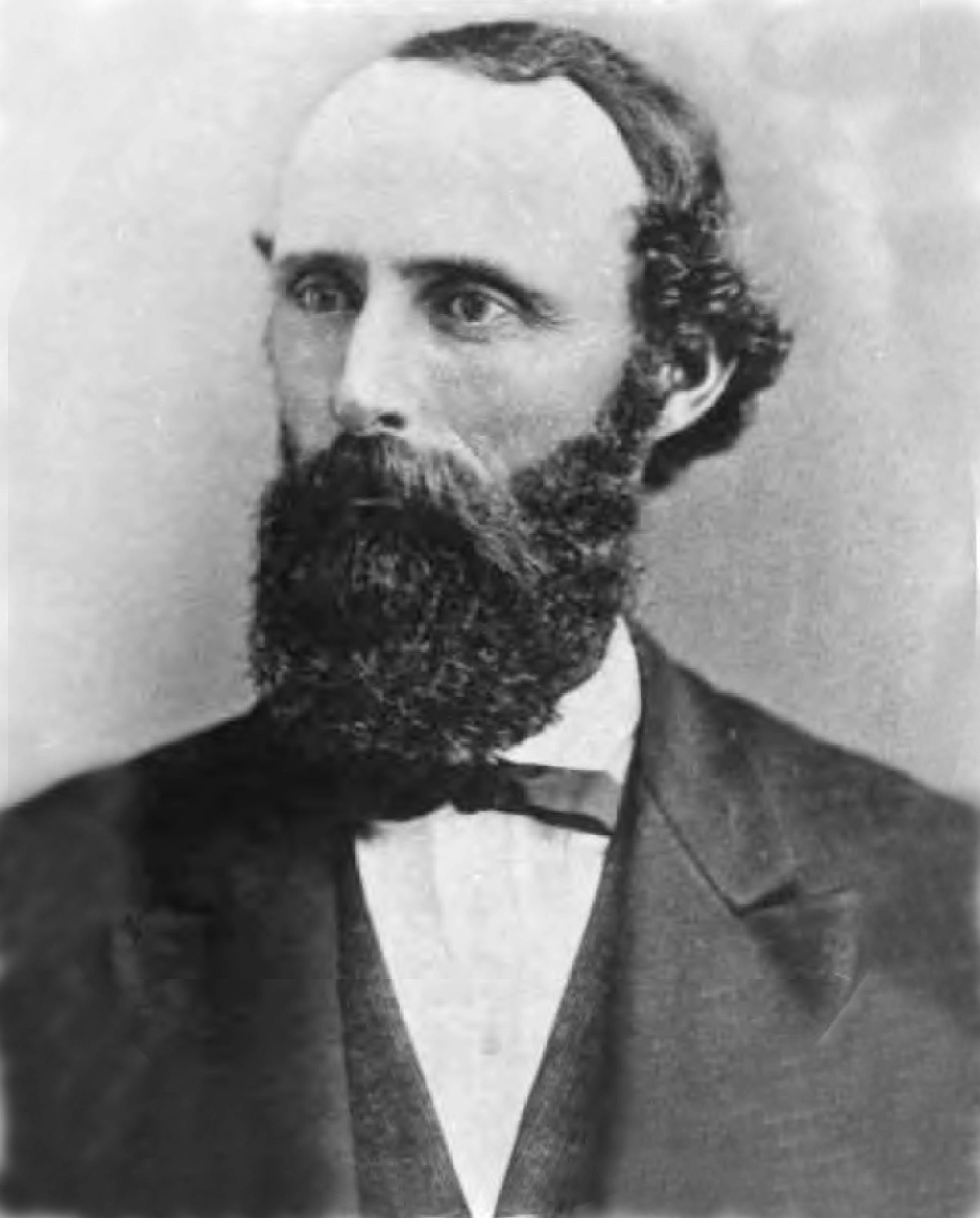
Commander William T. Glassell CSN

William Thornton Glassell (January 15, 1831 – January 28, 1876) was an officer in the Confederate States Navy during the American Civil War. He laid out the city of Orange, California.

== Early life and career ==
Glassell was born in Culpeper County, Virginia, was appointed a midshipman in the United States Navy from the state of Alabama (March 15, 1848). When he was still a midshipman, his ship, the St. Laurence was sent to The Great Exhibition (1851 ) in London. Lady Byron (Anne Isabella Byron, Baroness Byron), widow of the famous Lord Byron, visited the ship and invited only Glassell to dine with her the next evening. He accepted and "had a very pleasant interview."

== Civil War ==
Promoted to lieutenant in 1855, he was aboard USS Hartford off China when the Civil War broke out. When Hartford reached Philadelphia, Glassell declined to swear an additional oath of allegiance prescribed for Southerners, and was consequently imprisoned at Fort Warren and dropped from the U.S. service (December 6, 1861). Confederate authorities issued him a lieutenant's commission, arranged his exchange, and assigned him to CSS Chicora in the Charleston Squadron. Glassell commanded his ship's forward division during the squadron's attack on the Union blockade (January 31, 1863). Intrigued by the army's experiments with torpedoes and mines, he requested and received assignment to a special command training to attack the blockading fleet's monitors.

On the night of October 5, 1863, Glassell and a crew of three in the diminutive torpedo boat CSS David attacked the most powerful ship in the United States Navy, New Ironsides. The Confederates rammed a spar torpedo against the ironclad six feet beneath the waterline. The explosion threw a geyser of water over David, extinguishing its fires and leaving it immobile in a hail of small-arms fire. Most of the Confederates abandoned ship. The pilot stayed on board and the fireman soon reboarded the drifting boat, relit the fire, and reached the safety of Charleston Harbor. Glassell, and the other crewman were however captured and returned to Fort Warren. New Ironsides lost one dead and two wounded. Initially thought undamaged, it was leaking so badly that repairs kept it out of action until the last months of 1864.

Glassell, while in prison, was promoted to commander for his attack on New Ironsides. Exchanged in the last six months of the war, he returned to Charleston, South Carolina. On the evacuation of that city he was transferred to Richmond, Virginia and assigned to command the ironclad Fredericksburg in the James River Squadron. With Richmond's evacuation, the squadron's personnel were reorganized as artillery and infantry, and Glassell commanded a regiment. He was paroled at Greensboro, North Carolina, on April 28, 1865.

== Orange, California ==
Captain Glassell's health had been broken as a result of his experiences while in the Confederate Army, both by his hazardous undertaking, and subsequent capture and eighteen months in a northern military prison. He came to visit his elder brother Andrew Glassell in Los Angeles, and stayed to help in developing the Richland Tract in the capacity of surveyor. The city of Orange was founded by attorneys Andrew Glassell and Alfred Chapman, who had participated in the partition of Rancho Santiago de Santa Ana and were active in similar land lawsuits.

Captain Glassell surveyed the 600-acre (2.4 km^{2}) tract of land for his brother and Chapman in 1871. In 1872 the Richland subdivision was placed on the market. In 1873, when a post office was sought it was discovered that there was a town in Sacramento County by the name of Richland. As an alternative, Orange was chosen, possibly after Orange County, Virginia, where the Glassell family's 'Richland' plantation was located.

== Family life ==
William T. Glassell died at the age of 48 in Los Angeles. His great-nephew was George Smith Patton.

== Sources ==
- Samuel Armor (1921) History of Orange County, California Historic Record Co, Los Angeles
