= USS Memphis (1862) =

19th-century American steamship

Coordinates: 47.620°N 122.377°W

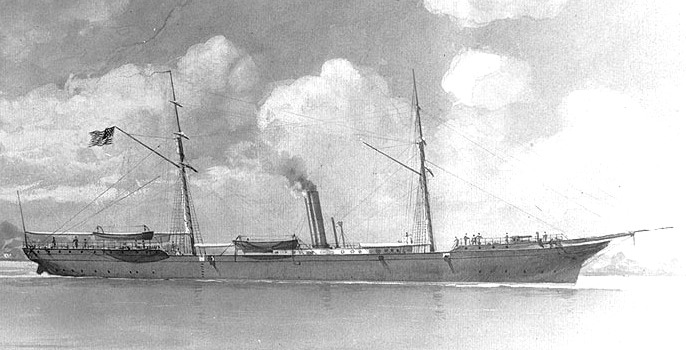
- USS Memphis

History

United Kingdom
- Name: Memphis
- Owner: Denny & Begbie
- Builder: William Denny and Brothers, Dumbarton, Scotland
- Launched: April 3, 1862
- Home port: London
- Identification: United Kingdom Official Number 44836
- Fate: Captured, July 31, 1862

United States
- Name: USS Memphis
- Acquired: by capture July 31, 1862; Purchased, September 4, 1862
- Commissioned: October 4, 1862
- Decommissioned: May 6, 1867
- Fate: Sold, May 8, 1869

United States
- Name: Mississippi
- Owner: William Weld & Co (1869 – c. 1875); Frederick Baker (c.1875–1879); H. Hastings & Co. (1879–1881); Edward Lawrence (1881–1882); Oregon Improvement Co. (1882–1883)
- Acquired: May 8, 1869
- Home port: Boston, Massachusetts (1869–1879); New York (1879–1881); Portland, Oregon (1881–1883)
- Fate: Destroyed by fire, May 13, 1883

General characteristics
- Type: Screw steamer
- Tonnage: 1,091 GRT, 791 NRT
- Length: 239 ft (72.8 m)
- Beam: 30 ft 2 in (9.2 m)
- Depth: 19 ft (5.8 m)
- Installed power: 2-cylinder Steam engine, 200nhp
- Propulsion: Single screw propeller
- Speed: 11.5 kn (21.3 km/h)
- Armament: 7 × guns

The second USS Memphis was a 7-gun screw steamer, built by William Denny and Brothers, Dumbarton, Scotland in 1861, which briefly served as a Confederate blockade runner before being captured and taken into the Union Navy during the American Civil War. She was destroyed by fire in 1883.

== Description ==
The ship was 239 feet (72.8 m) long, with a beam of 30 feet 2 inches (9.2 m) and a depth of 19 feet (5.8 m). She was powered by a 2-cylinder steam engine having cylinders of 46 inches (120 cm) diameter by 36 inches (91 cm) stroke. Rated at 200 nhp, it drove a single screw propeller, giving a speed of 11.5 knots (21.3 km/h). She was assessed at 1,091 GRT, 791 NRT.

== History ==
Memphis was built by William Denny and Brothers, Dumbarton, United Kingdom for Peter Denny and Thomas Begbie. She was launched on April 3, 1862. Her port of registry was London and the United Kingdom Official Number 44836 was allocated.

=== Civil War service ===
==== Confederate blockade runner ====
Memphis — on her maiden voyage, while running the Union blockade of Confederate ports on June 23, 1862 — ran aground off Sullivan's Island, South Carolina while attempting to enter Charleston harbor. Efficient work by Southern troops got her partially unloaded on the following day, and she was towed to safety by the steamships Etiwan and Marlon before Federal warships could hit her with shell fire. They were kept at bay by gunfire from Fort Beauregard. Memphis was captured by sidewheel gunboat USS Magnolia outbound from Charleston with a cargo of cotton on July 31, 1862, and purchased by the Union Navy from a prize court at New York City on September 4, 1862.

==== Union blockade ship ====
Memphis was commissioned on October 4, 1862, Acting Volunteer Lieutenant Pendleton G. Watmough in command. Assigned to the South Atlantic Blockading Squadron, Memphis sailed for Charleston and began service on October 14 with the capture of British steamer Ouachita bound for Havana, Cuba. She continued patrol in 1862–1863. On January 4, 1863, she joined sidewheel steamer Quaker City in taking Confederate sloop Mercury with a cargo of turpentine for Nassau, Bahamas. On January 31, Confederate ironclads CSS Palmetto State and CSS Chicora made a dash out of Charleston Harbor into the midst of the blockading ships. Screw steamer Mercedita was rammed and disabled by Palmetto State while sidewheel steamer Keystone State was next attacked and left for Memphis to take in tow. The two rams then retired.

By March of the following year, Memphis was operating in the North Edisto River. On March 6, 1864, Confederate torpedo boat CSS David attempted a run on the Union blockader. The spar torpedo struck Memphis' port quarter but did not explode. After her second torpedo misfired, David retreated upstream out of range of her foe's heavy guns. Memphis, uninjured, continued her blockading duties to the end of the Civil War.

=== Post-war ===
On May 6, 1867, Memphis was decommissioned, and sold to V. Brown & Co., at New York on May 8, 1869. Renamed Mississippi, She was sold to William Weld & Co. of Boston, Massachusetts. On May 12, 1869, she was reported to have been wrecked on Mauritius. On 29 August 1871, she was reported to have been wrecked in the Hatteras Inlet during a hurricane. All on board were rescued. She was on a voyage from New York to New Orleans, Louisiana. Mississippi was sold c.1875 to Frederick Baker, Boston. In 1879, she was sold to H. Hastings & Co., Boston. Mississippi was sold in 1881 to Edward Lawrence, New York. She was sold in 1882 to the Oregon Improvement Co, Portland, Oregon. On May 13, 1883, when she was gutted by a dock fire at Seattle, Washington.

== See also ==
- List of ships captured in the 19th century#American Civil War
- Bibliography of early United States naval history#American Civil War
