= List of shipwrecks in January 1864 =

The list of shipwrecks in January 1864 includes ships sunk, foundered, wrecked, grounded, or otherwise lost during January 1864.

== 1 January ==
List of shipwrecks: 1 January 1864
Ship	State	Description
Gal Sal	United Kingdom	The schooner was wrecked at Orfordness, Suffolk. She was on a voyage from Colchester, Essex to South Shields, County Durham.
Harkaway	United Kingdom	The ship ran aground on the Gunfleet Sand, in the North Sea off the coast of Essex. She was refloated with assistance from a smack and taken in to the River Colne.
Iris	France	The ship was wrecked near Bayonne, Basses-Pyrénées.
John B. White	United States Army	American Civil War: The tug was sunk by a Confederate mine in the waters of Virginia, Confederate States of America.
John Linn	United Kingdom	The full-rigged ship was abandoned in the Atlantic Ocean. Her 29 crew were rescued by the barque Felix Bernabo (France). She was discovered the next day by Deogaum (Belgium). Her cargo and stores were taken aboard Deoagaum and John Linn was set afire and sunk on 6 January. She was on a voyage from Bombay, India to Liverpool, Lancashire.
Nola	United Kingdom	The paddle steamer was wrecked on a reef north west of Bermuda. She was on a voyage from Glasgow, Renfrewshire to Nassau, Bahamas.
St. Spiridone	Italy	The ship ran aground and sank at Ramsgate, Kent, United Kingdom. She was on a voyage from South Shields, County Durham, United Kingdom to Constantinople, Ottoman Empire.
Sylvanus	United Kingdom	American Civil War, Union blockade: The schooner, a blockade runner with a cargo of salt, liquor, and cordage, was hit at the waterline with an 11-inch (279-mm) shell and driven ashore in Doboy Sound, Georgia, Confederate States of America, by the gunboat USS Huron (United States Navy). The tide then covered her.
Zeus	Prussia	The barque was wrecked near Naples, Italy. Her crew survived. She was on a voyage from Middlesbrough, Yorkshire to Naples.
Unidentified schooner	Unknown	American Civil War, Union blockade: A schooner blockade runner with a cargo of turpentine, was burned at Murrell's Inlet, South Carolina, Confederate States of America, by a landing party of United States Navy and United States Marine Corps personnel from the gunboat USS Nipsic (United States Navy).
Unidentified ship	Flag unknown	A ship was wrecked on the Haisborough Sands, in the North Sea off the coast of Norfolk, United Kingdom. Fifteen crew were rescued by the Scratby Lifeboat.
Unidentified ship	Russia	A full-rigged ship was abandoned in the North Sea 11 nautical miles (20 km; 13 mi) north of the Haisborough Sands. Her crew were rescued by a yawl.

== 2 January ==
List of shipwrecks: 2 January 1864
Ship	State	Description
Alfred	United Kingdom	The ship was driven ashore and wrecked at Point Galeaur, São Miguel Island, Azores with the loss of all hands.
Celia	United Kingdom	The ship foundered in the Atlantic Ocean 40 nautical miles (74 km) west north west of the Isles of Scilly. Her crew were rescued by Persian (United Kingdom). She was on a voyage from Cardiff, Glamorgan to Penzance, Cornwall.
Funfte Mar	Stettin	The ship was wrecked on the Haisborough Sands, in the North Sea off the cost of Norfolk, United Kingdom. Her crew were rescued by the California Lifeboat. She was on a voyage from Danzig to London, United Kingdom. She was later refloated and taken in to Trimingham, Norfolk.
Hamburgh	Hamburg	The ship was wrecked at São Miguel Island.
Hamilton Grey	United Kingdom	The barque was driven ashore and wrecked at Minerstown, County Down. Her crew were rescued. She was on a voyage from Liverpool, Lancashire to La Spezia, Italy.
Johanna	Flag unknown	The ship was driven ashore and wrecked on São Miguel Island. She was on a voyage from Hondeklip Bay to Swansea, Glamorgan, United Kingdom.
Maria Theresa	United Kingdom	The brig was wrecked on the Longsand, in the North Sea off the coast of Essex with the loss of a crew member. She was on a voyage from Amsterdam, North Holland, Netherlands to Naples, Italy.
Three Daisies	United Kingdom	The steamship was driven ashore and severely damaged at Penmon, Anglesey. She was on a voyage from Liverpool, Lancashire to Portmadoc, Caernarfonshire. She was refloated on 11 January and taken in to Bangor, Caernarfonshire.

== 3 January ==
List of shipwrecks: 3 January 1864
Ship	State	Description
Caroline	United Kingdom	The brig was driven ashore at Hartlepool, County Durham and was abandoned by all but her captain. She was on a voyage from Hartlepool to Seaham. She was refloated.
Felton Park	United Kingdom	The barque was wrecked at Odesa. She was on a voyage from Odesa to an English port. She broke up completely on 26 March.
Grafton	United Kingdom	The sealing brigantine was wrecked in the north arm of Carnley Harbour, Auckland Island. Three of the five members of the crew survived, despite being marooned for 18 months.
Irwell	United Kingdom	The schooner sprang a leak and was beached at Grimsby, Lincolnshire. She was on a voyage from South Shields, County Durham to Ipswich, Suffolk.
Jacatra	Hamburg	The ship was destroyed by fire in the Indian Ocean. She was on a voyage from Hamburg to Batavia, Netherlands East Indies.
Ninette	United Kingdom	The ship ran aground on the Haisborough Sands, in the North Sea off the coast of Norfolk. She was on a voyage from Danzig to London. She was refloated the nexty day and taken in to Cromer, Norfolk.
Victory	United Kingdom	The paddle tug was driven ashore and wrecked at Hartlepool. Her crew were rescued by a pilot coble.
William Parker	United Kingdom	The schooner was driven ashore at Hartlepool and was abandoned by her crew. She was on a voyage from Hartlepool to Seaham. She was refloated the next day.

== 4 January ==
List of shipwrecks: 4 January 1864
Ship	State	Description
Agnes	United Kingdom	The schooner collided with Circassian (United Kingdom) and foundered. Her crew were rescued by Circassian. Agnes was on a voyage from Granville, Manche, France to Cardiff, Glamorgan.
Andrew	Hamburg	The full-rigged ship was went ashore at Thorpeness, near Aldeburgh, Suffolk, United Kingdom due to a navigational error and became a wreck. Her crew reached shore. She was on a voyage from Hamburg to Cardiff, Glamorgan, United Kingdom.
Bonne Catherine	France	The fishing vessel was wrecked on the Îlle Pelée Rocks, on the coast of Seine-Inférieure. She subsequently floated off and was discovered capsized in the English Channel off Portland, Dorset, United Kingdom on 20 February.
Elise	Russia	The brig was wrecked on the Longsand, in the North Sea off the coast of Essex, United Kingdom with the loss of five of her ten crew. Survivors were rescued by Queen (United Kingdom). She was on a voyage from Stettin to London, United Kingdom.
Pearl	United Kingdom	The Lowestoft smack was wrecked at Thorpeness, near Aldeburgh, Suffolk, United Kingdom due to a navigational error and strong winds. Her crew reached shore.
Primo Genito	Kingdom of Lombardy–Venetia	The ship was abandoned off Dunkirk, Nord, France. Her crew were rescued by a Belgian pilot boat. Primo Genito was on a voyage from Sunderland, County Durham, United Kingdom to Venice. She subsequently ran aground off Zuydcoote, West Flanders, Belgium.

== 5 January ==
List of shipwrecks: 5 January 1864
Ship	State	Description
Annette Cathalina	Netherlands	The ship was driven ashore at Sea Palling, Norfolk, United Kingdom. She was on a voyage from Groningen to London, United Kingdom. She was refloated on 10 January and towed in to Great Yarmouth, Norfolk.
Bienvenu	France	The lugger ran aground off the Godrevy Lighthouse, Cornwall, United Kingodom. She was on avoyage from Cardiff, Glamorgan, United Kingdom to Nantes, Loire-Inférieure. She was refloated and put in to St. Ives, Cornwall in a leaky condition.
Bonne Catherine	France	The ship was wrecked at Cherbourg, Seine-Inférieure. She was on a voyage from Caen, Calvados to "Tregnen".
Minniehaha	United Kingdom	The brig was abandoned in the Atlantic Ocean. Her crew were rescued. She was on a voyage from Providence to Philadelphia, Pennsylvania, United States.
Norfolk	United Kingdom	The steamship ran aground on the Westplaat, in the North Sea off the coast of South Holland, Netherlands.
William and Mary	United Kingdom	The ship was driven ashore in Dally Bay, Wigtownshire. She was on a voyage from Greenock, Renfrewshire to Saint-Nazaire, Loire-Inférieure, France.

== 6 January ==
List of shipwrecks: 6 January 1864
Ship	State	Description
Norma	United Kingdom	The brig was towed in to the Isles of Scilly in a derelict condition.
Petrel	United Kingdom	The schooner struck a reef off the coast of Brazil and sank. Her crew survived.
Zeus	United Kingdom	The ship struck a breakwater at Amsterdam, North Holland, Netherlands. She was on a voyage from Middlesbrough, Yorkshire to Amsterdam.

== 7 January ==
List of shipwrecks: 7 January 1864
Ship	State	Description
Countess of Winton	United Kingdom	The barque caught fire in the port of Valparaíso, Chile, after part-dicharge of cargo and on a voyage from Liverpool, England, to Callao, Peru. On the next day, in attempts to beach her, she went on rocks and vecame a total loss.
Dare, or The Dare	Confederate States of America	American Civil War, Union blockade: Pursued by the armed screw steamers USS Aries and USS Montgomery (both United States Navy), the sidewheel paddle steamer, a blockade runner, ran aground in fog and was abandoned by her crew at North Inlet, near Lockwood Folly Inlet, North Carolina. Boat crews from Aries and Montgomery then boarded and burned her.
Lincluden Castle	United Kingdom	The ship ran aground in Galway Bay. She was on a voyage from Callao, Peru to Galway. She was refloated.
Spring Flower	United Kingdom	The ship was driven ashore in Killala Bay. She was on a voyage from Odesa to Sligo. She had been refloated by 10 January and taken in to Sligo.
Swalan	Sweden	The brig ran aground on the Flemish Banks, in the North Sea. She was on a voyage from Stockholm to Beyrout, Ottoman Syria. She was refloated and put into Ramsgate, Kent, United Kingdom in a leaky condition.
Trevelyan	Netherlands	The schooner ran aground on the Westplaat and was abandoned.

== 8 January ==
List of shipwrecks: 8 January 1864
Ship	State	Description
Alliance	United Kingdom	The ship was driven ashore in the Black Sea.
George H. Warren	United States	The ship was driven ashore and wrecked at Carnsore Point, County Wexford, United Kingdom. She was on a voyage from Saint John, New Brunswick, British North America to Liverpool, Lancashire, United Kingdom.
Provindence	United Kingdom	The brigantine was towed in to Dundalk, County Louth in a derelict condition. She was on a voyage from Liverpool, Lancashire to Havre de Grâce, Seine-Inférieure.
Roi de Cœur	France	The ship was wrecked at Bône, Algeria.
Sundsvall	Sweden	The brig was driven ashore at Tynemouth, Northumberland, United Kingdom. She was on a voyage from Gothenburg to South Shields, County Durham, United Kingdom. She was refloated and taken in to South Shields.
Unnamed	United Kingdom	The schooner collided with Prince of the Seas ( (United Kingdom of Great Britain and Ireland) ) Jersey) and sank 5 nautical miles (9.3 km) off Fowey, Cornwall with the loss of all hands.

== 9 January ==
List of shipwrecks: 9 January 1864
Ship	State	Description
Colina	United Kingdom	The barque was driven ashore at Ballyhely, County Wexford. She was on a voyage from Cyprus to Glasgow, Renfrewshire.
Flipan	United Kingdom	The ship ran aground in Lough Foyle. She was on a voyage from Sulina, Ottoman Empire to Londonderry. She had sunk by 13 January.
Flora	United Kingdom	The 571-gross register ton sidewheel paddle steamer foundered in the Atlantic Ocean. Her crew were rescued. She was on a voyage from Bermuda to Halifax, Nova Scotia British North America for repairs.
Gipsy Queen	United Kingdom	The ship ran aground off Niarbyl, Isle of Man. She was on a voyage from Greenock, Renfrewshire to Liverpool, Lancashire. She was refloated and put in to Douglas, Isle of Man in a sinking condition.
Marco Polo	United Kingdom	The schooner was driven ashore at Breaksea Point, Glamorgan. She was on a voyage from Dunkirk, Nord to Bristol, Gloucestershire. She was refloated and taken in to Aberthaw, Glamorgan.
Pillgwelly	United Kingdom	The ship was abandoned in the Atlantic Ocean 50 nautical miles (93 km) west of Cape Clear Island, County Cork. Her crew were rescued by Oquendo (Flag unknown). Pillgwelly was on a voyage from Agrigento, Sicily, Italy to Queenstown, County Cork.

== 10 January ==
List of shipwrecks: 10 January 1864
Ship	State	Description
Eliza	France	The ship was wrecked at Worms Head, Glamorgan, United Kingdom. She was on a voyage from Saint-Malo, Ille-et-Vilaine to Carmarthen, United Kingdom.
USS Iron Age	United States Navy	American Civil War, Union blockade: The armed screw steamer ran aground in Lockwood's Folly Inlet, North Carolina, Confederate States of America. After salvage efforts failed, she was set afire and blown up by her crew on 11 January to prevent her capture by Confederate forces.
Lurline	United Kingdom	The ship was driven ashore and severely damaged at Donegal. She was refloated the next day.
Mercy Jane	United Kingdom	The ship was holed by sunken piles at Milford Haven, Pembrokeshire and was beached. She was on a voyage from the Clyde to Brest, Finistère, France. She was subsequently placed under repair.
Mountaineer	United Kingdom	The brig was driven ashore in Ballyheige Bay, County Kerry. she was on a voyage from Liverpool, Lancashire to Limerick.
Olive	United Kingdom	The schooner struck the Fowler Rock, off Dundee, Forfarshire. She capsized and sank.
Vigo	France	The lugger was driven ashore on the Mull of Galloway, Wigtownshire, United Kingdom with the loss of three of her six crew. She was on a voyage from Dublin to Glasgow, Renfrewshire, United Kingdom.

== 11 January ==
List of shipwrecks: 11 January 1864
Ship	State	Description
Anna Margretha	Sweden	The brig ran aground and capsized at Hartlepool, County Durham, United Kingdom. Her crew were rescued. She was on a voyage from Antwerp, Belgium to Hartlepool.
Ballarat	United Kingdom	The smack was driven ashore and wrecked in Ardwell Bay, Wigtownshire. Her crew were rescued. She was on a voyage from Waterford to Peel, Isle of Man.
Bjarne	Norway	The brig was wrecked at Lindisfarne, Northumberland, United Kingdom. She was on a voyage from Christiania to Newcastle upon Tyne, Northumberland. She was refloated in late January and towed in to Berwick upon Tweed.
Countess of Morley	United Kingdom	The schooner was driven ashore and wrecked on Burial Isle, County Antrim. She was on a voyage from Whitehaven, Cumberland to Glasgow, Renfrewshire.
Donna	United Kingdom	The brig was driven ashore at Robin Hoods Bay, Yorkshire. She was on a voyage from London to the River Tyne. She was refloated on 23 January and towed in to the River Tyne.
Estelle Marie	France	The lugger was wrecked on the Mull of Galloway, Wigtownshire with the loss of three of her crew. She was on a voyage from Dublin to the Clyde.
Juliana	United Kingdom	The brig was wrecked at Torr Head, County Antrim. She was on a voyage from Glasgow to Puerto Rico.
Kong Oscar	Norway	The barque was driven ashore at Newbiggin-by-the-Sea, Northumberland. All fifteen people on board were rescued by the Newbiggin Lifeboat. She was on a voyage either from Miramichi, New Brunswick, British North America to the River Tyne, or from Kristiansand to Newcastle upon Tyne. She was refloated on 13 January and towed in to the River Tyne.
Lady Mary	United Kingdom	The barque was wrecked on the Upgang Rock, of the coast of Yorkshire. Her crew were rescued. She was refloated on 15 January and towed in to Whitby.
Leda	United Kingdom	The brig struck the Upgang Rock. She was taken in to Hartlepool in a leaky condition.
Neil Dow	United Kingdom	The schooner was driven ashore and wrecked at Redcar, Yorkshire. Her crew took to a boat; they were rescued by the brig William (United Kingdom).
Ranger	United Kingdom	American Civil War, Union blockade: Carrying a cargo of ammunition, rifle muskets, and other arms, the 500-ton sidewheel paddle steamer, a blockade runner, was forced aground on the coast one mile (1.6 km) west of Lockwood's Folly Inlet, North Carolina, Confederate States of America by the steam frigate USS Minnesota, the armed screw steamers USS Aries and USS Daylight, and the hermaphrodite brig USS Governor Buckingham (all United States Navy). A fire then destroyed her.
Stipan	Austrian Empire	The barque was holed by her anchor and sank at Moville, County Donegal. She was on a voyage from Sulina, Ottoman Empire to Londonderry. She was a total loss.
Tantivy	United Kingdom	The schooner was driven ashore and wrecked at Arisaig, Inverness-shire. Her crew survived. She was on a voyage from Newcastle upon Tyne to Dublin. Tantivy was refloated on 14 January and towed in to Greenock, Renfrewshire by the steamship Clydesdale (United Kingdom).
Vesta	United Kingdom	American Civil War, Union blockade: Pursued by the armed sidewheel paddle steamers USS Keystone State and USS Quaker City and the sloop-of-war USS Tuscarora (all United States Navy) on the evening of 10 January, the 500-ton screw steamer, a blockade runner carrying a cargo of shoes, blankets, cloth, clothes, a new uniform for General Robert E. Lee, paper, and stationery ran aground between Little River Inlet and Tubb's Inlet on the coast of North Carolina. Her crew set her on fire and abandoned her. The armed screw steamer USS Aries (United States Navy) discovered her aground and burning on 11 January.
William	United Kingdom	The schooner collided with the Breakwater Lightship ( Trinity House) off Anglesey and was abandoned by her crew, who got aboard the lightship. She subsequently came ashore west of Cannel's Point and was wrecked.
Zipporah	United Kingdom	The ship ran aground on the Haisborough Sands, in the North Sea off the coast of Norfolk. She was on a voyage from Falkenberg, Sweden to London. She was refloated and taken in to Great Yarmouth, Norfolk for repairs.

== 12 January ==
List of shipwrecks: 12 January 1864
Ship	State	Description
Atlas	United Kingdom	The steamship was driven ashore near Rosetta, Egypt. She was on a voyage from Marseille, Bouches-du-Rhône, France to Alexandria, Egypt. She was later refloated and towed in to Alexandria by HMS Psyche (Royal Navy).
Emma	United Kingdom	The smack was driven ashore on the Isle of Man. She was on a voyage from Liverpool, Lancashire to Port St. Mary, Isle of Man. She was refloated and taken in to Castletown, Isle of Man in a sinking condition.
Hercules	Russia	The ship was wrecked 12 nautical miles (22 km) south of Peterhead, Aberdeenshire, United Kingdom.
James Ewing	United Kingdom	The brig was wrecked near Rosetta. Her crew were rescued. She was on a voyage from Alexandria to South Shields, County Durham.
Napoleon III	United Kingdom	The ship was driven ashore at Esquimalt, Colony of British Columbia. She was on a voyage from London to Esquimalt. She was refloated with assistance from HMS Camden and taken in to Esquimalt.
Neptune	United Kingdom	The ship ran aground at Hartlepool, County Durham. She was refloated.
Norwegian	United Kingdom	The full-rigged ship ran aground on the Cross Sand, in the North Sea off the coast of Norfolk.
Rob Roy	United Kingdom	The tug was wrecked on the Steel Rocks, Whitburn, County Durham. Her crew were rescued by a lifeboat. She was on a voyage from Sunderland, County Durham to the River Tyne.
Seaflower	United Kingdom	The schooner ran aground on the Cross Sand. She was on a voyage from Boulogne, Pas-de-Calais to South Shields, County Durham. She was refloated on 14 January and assisted in to Great Yarmouth, Norfolk in a severely leaky condition.

== 13 January ==
List of shipwrecks: 13 January 1864
Ship	State	Description
Charles Edward	United Kingdom	The schooner was damaged by fire at Holyhead, Anglesey.
Emily	United Kingdom	The fishing smack capsized and sank at Yarmouth, Isle of Wight. Her crew were rescued.
Excelsior	United Kingdom	The ship was driven ashore near Kingsdown, Kent. She was on a voyage from London to Cochin, India. She was refloated and taken in to The Downs.
Liberator	United Kingdom	The ship was driven ashore at the North Foreland, Kent. She was on a voyage from London to Swansea, Glamorgan.
Mars	United Kingdom	The ship was driven ashore on Anholt. She was on a voyage from Kronstadt, Russia to Dundee, Forfarshire. She was later refloated and resumed her voyage.
Susanne	United Kingdom	The ship was wrecked near Monopoli, Italy. She was on a voyage from Newport, Monmouthshire to Bari, Italy.
Venetia	United Kingdom	The ship was driven ashore near Kingsdown. She was on a voyage from London to Adelaide, South Australia. She was refloated and taken in to The Downs.
Unnamed	(United Kingdom of Great Britain and Ireland) Jersey	The smack foundered off Rye, Sussex. The sole crew member on board was rescued.

== 14 January ==
List of shipwrecks: 14 January 1864
Ship	State	Description
Bloomer	United Kingdom	The ship ran aground and sank in Lough Foyle. She was on a voyage from Maryport, Cumberland to Londonderry.
Emma Jane	United States	American Civil War: The 1,097-ton full-rigged ship, bound in ballast from Bombay, India, for Burma, was captured and burned in the Indian Ocean off India′s Malabar Coast (07°59′00″S 76°04′45″E) by the screw sloop-of-war CSS Alabama (Confederate States Navy).
Erromanga	United Kingdom	The barque was driven ashore near Stefano Point, Ottoman Empire.
Guiding Star	(United Kingdom of Great Britain and Ireland) British North America	The barque was driven ashore at Southend, Argyllshire. She was on a voyage from Ardrossan, Ayrshire to Genoa, Italy. She was refloated on 19 January and towed in to the Clyde.
Undine	United Kingdom	The ship was driven ashore north of the Ilha de Itamaracá, Brazil. She was on a voyage from Paraíba to Pernambuco. She was later refloated and completed her voyage.
Young Racer	United Kingdom	American Civil War, Union blockade: The sloop, a blockade runner with a cargo of salt, was forced to run herself aground on the coast 15 nautical miles (28 km; 17 mi) north of Jupiter Inlet, Florida, Confederate States of America by small boats from the barque USS Roebuck (United States Navy). Young Racer′s crew then destroyed her to prevent her capture by the boat crews.

== 15 January ==
List of shipwrecks: 15 January 1864
Ship	State	Description
America	Bremen	The steamship ran aground at Imsum, Kingdom of Hanover. She was on a voyage from Bremen to New York, United States. She was refloated the next day and resumed her voyage.
Edith	United Kingdom	The schooner ran aground on a pile at Montrose, Forfarshire and was severely damaged.
Exhibition	United Kingdom	The ship ran aground and was damaged at Great Yarmouth, Norfolk. She was on a voyage from Great Yarmouth to South Shields, County Durham. She was refloated and taken in to Great Yarmouth in a leaky condition.
Fifeshire	United Kingdom	The barque ran aground on the Gunfleet Sand, in the North Sea off the coast of Essex. She was on a voyage from Sunderland, County Durham to London with coal. She was later refloated and towed in to Harwich, Essex on 26 January.
Lottie Sleigh / Lotty Sleigh	United Kingdom	The barque was severely damaged by an explosion of gunpowder in the River Mersey. All on board had abandoned ship before she blew up, causing extensive damage in Birkenhead, Cheshire. She was subsequently scrapped.
Sir William Wallace	United Kingdom	The ship ran aground at Lindisfarne, Northumberland. She was refloated.
Thomas Protheroe	United Kingdom	The ship collided with Augusta (Norway) and foundered in the English Channel 15 nautical miles (28 km) south west of Portland, Dorset. Her crew were rescued by a pilot cutter.

== 16 January ==
List of shipwrecks: 16 January 1864
Ship	State	Description
Anna Maria	United Kingdom	The schooner was run into by the steamship Edinburgh (United Kingdom) and was abandoned in the River Mersey. Anna Maria was on a voyage from Liverpool, Lancashire to Caernarfon. She collided with a Dutch schooner, the pilot of which go aboard and she was anchored in the Sloyne.
Astronom	Bremen	The ship was driven ashore at Dungeness, Kent, United Kingdom.
Star of the West	United Kingdom	The schooner collided with the schooners Helena and Julia and was beached at Hayle, Cornwall. She was on a voyage from Bridgwater, Somerset to Hayle.

== 17 January ==
List of shipwrecks: 17 January 1864
Ship	State	Description
Benjamin Scott	(United Kingdom of Great Britain and Ireland) Guernsey	The ship ran aground on the Horse Sand, in the Solent and sank. Her crew were rescued. She was on a voyage from Guernsey to London.
Dreadnought	United Kingdom	The ship ran aground in the River Mersey. She was on a voyage from Liverpool, Lancashire to Aden. She was refloated.
Ghengis Khan	United Kingdom	The ship was abandoned in the Atlantic Ocean (42°00′N 25°30′W). Her crew were rescued by the barque Edward (Prussia). Ghengis Khan was on a voyage from Saint John, New Brunswick, British North America to London.
Johanna Petron, and Nella	Netherlands	Johanna Petron collided with Nella and sank off The Lizard, Cornwall, United Kingdom. Her crew were rescued. She was on a voyage from Sunderland, County Durham, United Kingdom to Cádiz, Spain. Nella was on a voyage from the Nieuw Diep to Cádiz. She also sank. Her crew were rescued.
Palmyra	United Kingdom	The barque ran aground at Landguard Fort, Felixtowe, Suffolk. She was on a voyage from Hartlepool, County Durham to Dieppe, Seine-Inférieure, France. She was refloated with the assistance of two smacks and taken in to Harwich, Essex.
Planet	United Kingdom	The ship struck the Mort Stone, Devon. She was on a voyage from Great Yarmouth, Norfolk to Bristol, Gloucestershire. She put in to Ilfracombe, Devon in a waterlogged condition.
Royal Victoria	United Kingdom	The ship was abandoned at sea. She was on a voyage from Sunderland to Calcutta, India. Her seventeen crew took to two boats. Two crew died before the boats reached the Shetland Islands and one died in hospital.
Unice	United Kingdom	The ship was wrecked at Ballywalter, County Down with the loss of three of her crew.
William and Sarah	United Kingdom	The brig ran aground at Sunderland, County Durham. She was refloated.

== 18 January ==
List of shipwrecks: 18 January 1864
Ship	State	Description
Alice	United Kingdom	The steamship ran aground and was severely damaged at Hartlepool, County Durham. She was on a voyage from Seaham, County Durham to Faversham, Kent. She was refloated on 27 January.
Cluny	United Kingdom	The schooner was wrecked on the Goodwin Sands, Kent. Her nine crew were rescued by the Ramsgate Lifeboat and the lugger Morning Star. Cluny was on a voyage from Hartlepool to Dieppe, Seine-Inférieure, France.
Daniel Webster	United Kingdom	The ship was driven ashore at Ballywalter, County Down.
Elizabeth Ann	United Kingdom	The schooner collided with the schooner Earl of Devon (United Kingdom) and sank 20 nautical miles (37 km) north of the Longships, Cornwall. Her crew were rescued by Earl of Devon. Elizabeth Ann was on a voyage from Cardiff, Glamorgan to Penzance, Cornwall.
Eunice	United Kingdom	The schooner was driven ashore and wrecked at Ballywalter with the loss of three of her crew.
Jane and Jessie	United Kingdom	The schooner was driven ashore at Ballywalter. She was refloated and taken in to Belfast, County Antrim.
Mary Ann	United Kingdom	The brigantine was wrecked at Louisbourg, Nova Scotia, British North America. She was on a voyage from Harbour Grace, Nova Scotia to New York, United States.
Sultan	United Kingdom	The schooner was driven ashore at Ballywalter.
Windsor Forest	United Kingdom	The full-rigged ship was destroyed by fire in the Atlantic Ocean. Her 25 crew took to boats; they were rescued on 25 January by the brig Aino ( (Russian Empire) Grand Duchy of Finland), the schooner Surinam (Netherlands and a French barque. Windsor Forest was on a voyage from Liverpool, Lancashire to Bombay, India.

== 19 January ==
List of shipwrecks: 19 January 1864
Ship	State	Description
Grey Fox	United States	The 70-ton sternwheel paddle steamer was sunk by ice on the Ohio River at Louisville, Kentucky.
Jessie and Margaret	United Kingdom	The ship ran aground on Taylor's Bank, in Liverpool Bay and was abandoned by her crew. She was on a voyage from Runcorn, Cheshire to Stranraer, Wigtownshire. She floated off and came ashore at New Brighton, Cheshire.
Mermaid	United Kingdom	The brig sank off Great Orme Head, Caernarfonshire. Her crew were rescued. She was on a voyage from Bangor, Caernarfonshire to Liverpool, Lancashire.

== 20 January ==
List of shipwrecks: 20 January 1864
Ship	State	Description
Alice	United Kingdom	The steamship ran aground at Cullercoats, Northumberland. She was on a voyage from Grangemouth, Stirlingshire to South Shields, County Durham. She was refloated and beached on the Black Middens, off the coast of County Durham. Her crew survived.
Elvina	United States	The ship was holed when a spare mast broke free of its lashings and went overboard. She consequently foundered in the Atlantic Ocean with the loss of twenty of her 31 crew. Survivors took to a raft; only three of them survived to be rescued on 27 January by the barque Claire (France). Elvina was on a voyage from Calcutta, India to Boston, Massachusetts.
Florence Adelaide	United Kingdom	The ship struck a sunken rock and was wrecked in the Caramata Passage. Her crew were rescued. She was on a voyage from Cardiff, Glamorgan to Singapore, Straits Settlements.
Protomelia	United Kingdom	The barque was driven ashore at Point Isabella, Haiti and was abandoned by her crew. She was later refloated and proceeded for Jamaica.

== 21 January ==
List of shipwrecks: 21 January 1864
Ship	State	Description
Aletta	United Kingdom	The schooner was driven ashore in Lough Larne. She was on a voyage from Ballina, County Mayo to Liverpool, Lancashire. She was refloated the next day.
Alpine	Belgium	The schooner was wrecked on the Haaks sandbank, in the North Sea off the Dutch coast. She was on a voyage from Savanilla, Colombia to Bremen with tobacco.
Shanghae	United Kingdom	The ship was driven ashore at Brindisi, Italy.

== 22 January ==
List of shipwrecks: 22 January 1864
Ship	State	Description
Black and White	United Kingdom	The Mersey Flat sank in the River Mersey.
Demetrius	United Kingdom	The schooner was driven ashore at Ryhope, County Durham. She was on a voyage from North Shields, Northumberland to London. She was later refloated and beached on the North Sand in a waterlogged condition.
Desert Flower	(United Kingdom of Great Britain and Ireland) British North America	The ship was severely damaged by fire at Birkenhead, Cheshire with the loss of a crew member. Subsequently repaired.
Henry Fitzhugh	United States	The 217-ton sternwheel paddle steamer sank after striking ice on the Ohio River near Shawneetown, Illinois. She later was refloated.
Jupiter	United Kingdom	The ship was wrecked in the Salayer Strait. She was on a voyage from Bangkok, Siam to Hong Kong.
Marathon	United Kingdom	The ship was abandoned, waterlogged, in the Atlantic Ocean, 400 nautical miles (740 km) east of the Grand Banks of Newfoundland, with the loss of one of her eighteen crew. The survivors were rescued by Roger A. Heirn (United States). Marathon was on a voyage from Saint John, New Brunswick, British North America to Liverpool, Lancashire.
Mary	United Kingdom	American Civil War, Union blockade: Carrying a cargo of cotton, the sloop sprang a leak, ran aground, and was wrecked on the coast of Florida while en route from Jupiter Inlet to Key West, Florida, Confederate States of America, under the control of a United States Navy prize crew. A blockade runner, she had been captured by boats from the barque USS Roebuck (United States Navy) inside Jupiter Inlet on 19 January.
Star of the East	United Kingdom	The schooner was driven ashore on Heligoland. She was on a voyage from Cuba to Bremen. She was refloated on 25 January and towed in to Bremen by the steamship Sunson (Bremen).

== 23 January ==
List of shipwrecks: 23 January 1864
Ship	State	Description
Boston	United Kingdom	The paddle tug collided with Louisa Crawshay (United Kingdom) in the River Tyne and was severely damaged. She was beached.
Friends	United Kingdom	The ship was driven ashore at Donna Nook, Lincolnshire. She was on a voyage from Poole, Dorset to Burnham Overy Staithe, Norfolk. She had become a wreck by 7 February.
Jane	United Kingdom	The ship struck the Navestone, off the coast of Northumberland and sank. She was on a voyage from Kennet Pans, Clackmannanshire, to the River Tyne.

== 24 January ==
List of shipwrecks: 24 January 1864
Ship	State	Description
Czar	United Kingdom	The steamship was damaged by fire at Liverpool, Lancashire.
Star	United Kingdom	The ketch was driven ashore 1 nautical mile (1.9 km) east of Wells-next-the-Sea, Norfolk. She was on a voyage from Sunderland, County Durham to London.
Tumarac	United Kingdom	The ship ran aground on the Goodwin Sands, Kent. She was refloated and resumed her voyage.

== 25 January ==
List of shipwrecks: 25 January 1864
Ship	State	Description
Augustine	United Kingdom	The ship sank in the Chincha Islands, Peru.
Eliza Ann	United Kingdom	The barque was abandoned in the Atlantic Ocean. Her ten crew were rescued by the steamship Edinburgh (United Kingdom), but one of them died soon after being taken on board. Eliza Ann was on a voyage from Saint John, New Brunswick, British North America to Plymouth, Devon.
Robert and Ann	United Kingdom	The smack collided with Lloyd's (Norway) and sank in the North Sea. Her crew were rescued by Lloyd's.
Thomas J. Patten	United States	The 118-ton sternwheel paddle steamer burned on the Mississippi River at Walker's Bend below Memphis, Tennessee.
Unnamed	Norway	The brig ran aground on the Haisborough Sands, in the North Sea off the coast of Norfolk, United Kingdom.

== 26 January ==
List of shipwrecks: 26 January 1864
Ship	State	Description
Little Florrie	United Kingdom	The brigantine collided with the fishing smack Little Harry (United Kingdom) and sank off Plymouth, Devon. Her crew survived. Little Florrie was on a voyage from London to Nassau, Bahamas.

== 27 January ==
List of shipwrecks: 27 January 1864
Ship	State	Description
Nancy Dawson	United Kingdom	The schooner ran aground on the Long Nose Sand, off the Kent coast. She was on a voyage from Hartlepool, County Durham to Ramsgate, Kent. She was refloated and taken in to Ramsgate in a leaky condition.
Queen of Trumps	United Kingdom	The smack collided with the steamship Haswell (United Kingdom) and sank in the river Thames.
Wasa	Sweden	The ship sank with the loss of six lives. She was on a voyage from Liverpool, Lancashire, United Kingdom to Odesa.

== 28 January ==
List of shipwrecks: 28 January 1864
Ship	State	Description
Aurora	Netherlands	The brig was taken in to Kinsale, County Cork, United Kingdom in a derelict condition. She was on a voyage from Frontera de Tobasco, Mexico to Cork or Falmouth, Cornwall, United Kingdom.
Ellen	United Kingdom	The barque ran aground in the River Tyne. She was on a voyage from the River Tyne to Pará, Brazil. She was later refloated and taken in to North Shields, Northumberland.
Evansville	United States	The 155-ton sternwheel paddle steamer struck a snag and sank in the Mississippi River at Memphis.
Luzerne	United States	The 179- or 180-ton sidewheel paddle steamer was sunk by ice in the Mississippi River at Crawford's Landing, Mississippi.
Matilda	United Kingdom	The schooner was abandoned in a sinking condition. Her six crew were rescued by Adam Carr (United Kingdom). Matilda was on a voyage from Limerick to Glasgow, Renfrewshire.
Moderator	United States	The 231-ton sternwheel paddle steamer was sunk by ice in the Mississippi River at St. Louis, Missouri.
Swift	United Kingdom	The ship ran aground at Sunderland, County Durham. She was on a voyage from Sunderland to London. She was refloated and resumed her voyage, but put back to Sunderland on 30 January in a leaky condition.

== 29 January ==
List of shipwrecks: 29 January 1864
Ship	State	Description
George Croshaw	United Kingdom	The ship was driven ashore at Kingsdown, Kent. She was on a voyage from London to Calcutta, India.
Heinrich Siebrand	Wismar	The ship was driven ashore on Poel, Prussia. She was on a voyage from Sunderland, County Durham, United Kingdom to Wismar.
Mary Ann	United Kingdom	The brigantine sprang a leak and was abandoned in the North Sea off the coast of Yorkshire. She was on a voyage from South Shields, County Durham to Rochester, Kent.
Pak Waut	China	The ship ran aground in the Yangtze. She was on a voyage from Foochow to London, United Kingdom. She was refloated and resumed her voyage.

== 30 January ==
List of shipwrecks: 30 January 1864
Ship	State	Description
Catherine Robertson	United Kingdom	The smack collided with the steamship Tuskar (United Kingdom) and sank off the Cloch Lighthouse, Renfrewshire with the loss of one of her two crew.
Contest	United Kingdom	The dandy cutter struck the Skerry of Bora, off Gairsay, Orkney Islands. She was run ashore on Gairsay and wrecked.
Dolphin	United Kingdom	The schooner was driven ashore at Holyhead, Anglesey.
Nicta	Spain	The steamship was damaged by fire at Barcelona.

== 31 January ==
List of shipwrecks: 31 January 1864
Ship	State	Description
Angelique	France	The schooner was driven ashore 2 nautical miles (3.7 km) north of Ardrossan, Ayrshire, United Kingdom. Her crew were rescued. She was on a voyage from Nantes, Loire-Inférieure to the Clyde.
Clemence	Kingdom of Hanover	The koff was driven ashore and wrecked at Sogndal, Norway.
Dapper	United Kingdom	The brig ran aground on the Vlugtheuvel, off the Dutch coast.
Jennie Ford, or Jenny Ford	United States	The 396-ton barque, bound in ballast from San Francisco, to Puget Sound in Washington Territory, either ran aground in San Francisco County, California, or struck a rock and sank off North Head on the coast of the Washington Territory with the loss of twenty lives.
Mill Boy	United States	American Civil War: Carrying a Union Army cargo consisting of forage, stores, and a cannon, the 86-ton sternwheel paddle steamer parted her anchor rope on the White River in Arkansas during a storm, drifted nine miles (14 km) downstream, struck a snag, capsized, and sank nine miles (14 km) above Jacksonport, Arkansas. Union forces salvaged the cannon, but the ship and the rest of her cargo were lost.
Morga	United Kingdom	The brig was driven ashore at Crosby, Lancashire. She was on a voyage from Havana, Cuba to Liverpool, Lancashire.
Unnamed	United Kingdom	A brig was driven ashore at Cape San Antonio, Cuba.
Star of Peace	United Kingdom	The barque was wrecked on the Lady Ingros Rocks, 5 nautical miles (9.3 km) east south east of Cape Orne Saki, Japan. Her crew were rescued, but her captain refused to leave the vessel. She was on a voyage from Nagasaki to Yokohama.

== Unknown date ==
List of shipwrecks: Unknown date in January 1864
Ship	State	Description
Alida Margaretha	Netherlands	The ship was abandoned in the North Sea before 12 January. Her crew were rescued. She was on a voyage from Brake, Kingdom of Hanover to Newcastle upon Tyne, Northumberland, United Kingdom.
Annie	United Kingdom	The brig, of Aberaeron, Cardiganshire, Wales, was abandoned in the Mediterranean Sea and found at (41°N 2°E), south-west of Vilanova i la Geltrú, Barcelona Province, Spain, on 17 January, dismasted.
Arica	United Kingdom	The schooner was found abandoned and dismasted in the Mediterranean Sea between Barcelona, Spain, and Marseille, France on 11 January. She was on a voyage from Cardiff to Toulon or Marseille, France. The hulk was towed to Barcelona by the steamer Non Plus Ultra (Spain).
Caledonia	United Kingdom	The brig was driven ashore in Tarpaulin Cove before 13 January. She was on a voyage from New York, United States to Saint John, New Brunswick, British North America.
Charles	United Kingdom	The ship was abandoned in the Atlantic Ocean before 3 January.
Chico	Flag unknown	The ship was captured by pirates and burnt in the Lye Moon Passage before 26 January.
Clarence	United Kingdom	The ship was abandoned in the Atlantic Ocean before 18 January.
Don Juan	Spain	The ship was wrecked on the Carcos. She was on a voyage from New York to Manzanilla, Trinidad.
E. A. Soullard	United States	The ship was driven ashore and wrecked at the mouth of the Kennebec River before 13 January. She was on a voyage from Liverpool, Lancashire, United Kingdom to Bath, Maine.
Edisto	United States	The ship was destroyed by fire at sea. She was on a voyage from New York to Cette, Hérault, France.
Eliza	United States	The ship was wrecked at Bermuda. She was on a voyage from New York to Aux Cayes, Haiti.
Emily	United Kingdom	The ship ran aground in Killala Bay. She was on a voyage from Garston, Lancashire to Sligo. She was refloated and taken in to Sligo, where she arrived on 8 January.
Enid	United Kingdom	The ship was lost near "Carabernow", Ottoman Empire before 14 January.
Fair City	United Kingdom	The ship was driven ashore on Gotland, Sweden. She was refloated and taken in to Slitohamn for repairs.
Gazelle	United Kingdom	The ship was wrecked before 15 January. She was on a voyage from New York to Saint Croix, Virgin Islands.
General Simpson	United Kingdom	The ship was wrecked in the Chiloé Islands before 23 January. She was on a voyage from Bombay, India to Liverpool.
General Warner	United States	The barque was driven ashore and wrecked on the Islote de Sancti Petri, Spain. She was on a voyage from New York to Toulon, Var, France and Malta.
Giuseppe	Flag unknown	The ship was driven ashore at Gallipoli, Ottoman Empire.
Gleaner	United Kingdom	The ship departed from Hartlepool for Ramsgate in late January. No further trace, presumed foundered with the loss of all hands.
Glorias de Maria	Mexico	The ship was driven ashore at Matamoros.
Graham	United Kingdom	The barque struck a sunken rock. She was on a voyage from Batavia, Netherlands East Indies to the Clyde. She was consequently condemned on arrival.
Henzell's Patent	France	The ship was wrecked in the Seine.
Hero of Kars	United Kingdom	The ship was discovered abandoned in the Atlantic Ocean by Superior (United Kingdom) before 24 January. Some crew were put on board with the intention to taking her in to Plymouth. Hero of Kars had been on a voyage from South Shields, County Durham to Gibraltar.
Ivan	Russia	The ship ran aground at Dragør, Denmark before 25 January. She was on a voyage from Saint Petersburg to Dundee, Forfarshire, United Kingdom. She was refloated and taken in to Copenhagen in a leaky condition.
James Murphy	United Kingdom	The smack was wrecked near Portmagee, County Kerry before 16 January. She was on a voyage from Cork to Cahirciveen, County Kerry.
John L. Philbrick	United States	The barque was wrecked in the Abaco Islands before 9 January.
Kennett Kingsford	United Kingdom	The ship sank at Marstrand, Sweden before 20 January. She was on a voyage from Danzig to Liverpool. She was refloated on 18 March and towed to Gothenburg, Sweden.
Lady Mary Redhead	United Kingdom	The ship sank off Whitby, Yorkshire.
Laura	United Kingdom	The ship was wrecked near Laguna.
Linlin	United Kingdom	The ship was wrecked 20 nautical miles (37 km) south of "Truxillo". Her crew were rescued.
Louis Honore	France	The ship was wrecked at Agrigento, Sicily, Italy.
Lymm Gray	United Kingdom	The ship was holed by ice and sank at Hellevoetsluis, Zeeland, Netherlands.
Malabar	Unknown	The schooner was wrecked at Mendocino, California.
Mary Bangs	United Kingdom	The ship ran aground on the Goodwin Sands, Kent. She was on a voyage from Callao, Peru to Antwerp, Belgium.
Merechaum	United Kingdom	The ship was wrecked on the coast of Egypt. Her crew survived.
Morocco	United Kingdom	The steamship was driven ashore near "Umago" or "Winago". She was refloated with assistance from the steamship Pluto ( Austrian Empire) and taken in to Trieste, where she arrived on 25 January.
Neptune	United Kingdom	The ship was driven ashore near Kingsdown, Kent. She was on a voyage from Grimsby, Lincolnshire to Alexandria, Egypt.
Orion	Norway	The brig was driven ashore at Sunderland, County Durham, United Kingdom. She was later refloated and taken in to North Shields, Northumberland for repairs.
Real Salmistrida	Italy	The ship foundered off Manfredonia.
Sarah Maria	United Kingdom	The ship was abandoned off the Isles of Scilly. She was on a voyage from Cardiff, Glamorgan to Messina, Sicily. She was subsequently discovered by the schooner Result (United Kingdom), which put two crew on board. They took her in to Queenstown, County Cork.
Starbuck	United Kingdom	The schooner collided with the brig Hibernia and foundered off the Longships, Cornwall. Her crew survived. She was on a voyage from Neath, Glamorgan to Falmouth, Cornwall.
Statecie	United Kingdom	The ship was driven ashore 40 nautical miles (74 km) west of Aden before 27 December. Her crew survived, but were driven away by the local Arabs. She was on a voyage from Aden to Bombay.
Surat	United Kingdom	The barque was wrecked in the Thousand Islands, Netherlands East Indies before 15 January. She was on a voyage from Liverpool to Hong Kong.
Undine	United States	The 158-ton sidewheel paddle steamer sank after hitting ice on the Ohio River at New London, Indiana. Her cabin separated from her hull when she sank and went over the falls at Louisville, Kentucky.
Usk	United Kingdom	The barque was destroyed by fire in the Pacific Ocean 300 nautical miles (560 km) south of Caldera, Chile. Her crew were rescued. She was on a voyage from Swansea, Glamorgan to Huasco, Chile.
Wilhelmina	Netherlands	The ship ran aground off Goeree, Zeeland. She was on a voyage from Charleston, South Carolina, Confederate States of America to a Dutch port.
