= List of shipwrecks in September 1864 =

The list of shipwrecks in September 1864 includes ships sunk, foundered, grounded, or otherwise lost during September 1864.

== 1 September ==
List of shipwrecks: 1 September 1864
Ship	State	Description
Avalon	United Kingdom	The paddle steamer ran aground at Maassluis, South Holland, Netherlands. She was on a voyage from Harwich, Essex to Rotterdam South Holland. She was refloated on 3 September, without material damage.
Bramley-Moore	United Kingdom	The ship was wrecked on the English Bank, in the River Plate. She was on a voyage from Liverpool, Lancashire to the Turks Islands.
Czarina	United States	The barque collided with the steamship Kedar (United Kingdom) and was abandoned in a sinking condition. Her crew were rescued by Kedar. Czarina was on a voyage from Palermo, Sicily, Italy to New York.
HMS Eclipse	Royal Navy	The Cormorant-class gunvessel ran aground at Tauranga, New Zealand. She was refloated.
Eve	United Kingdom	The barque ran aground on the Flower Ledges, off the coast of Newfoundland, British North America. She was on a voyage from Quebec City, Province of Canada to the Clyde.
Timandra	United Kingdom	The barque was wrecked ond the Cabreras Rocks, 7 nautical miles (13 km) west of Tarifa, Spain with the loss of all but one of her crew. She was on a voyage from Newcastle upon Tyne, Northumberland to Ancona, Papal States.
T. W. Woolf	United Kingdom	The schooner ran aground on Tun's Bank, in Lough Foyle. She was on a voyage from Liverpool, Lancashire to Saint John's, Newfoundland, British North America. She was refloated with the assistance of a tug.
William V. Gillum	United States	The 70-ton sternwheel paddle steamer was wrecked in the Gulf of Mexico during a voyage from New Orleans, Louisiana, to Matamoros, Mexico. Her crew were rescued a few days later by the schooner Cory (Mexican Empire).

== 2 September ==
List of shipwrecks: 2 September 1864
Ship	State	Description
Anger	Flag unknown	The barque struck rocks and sank at Alexandria, Egypt. Her crew were rescued. She was on a voyage from Newcastle upon Tyne, Northumberland to Alexandria.
Leah	(Denmark) Duchy of Holstein	The vessel ran aground and sank at Buckie, Moray, United Kingdom. She was on a voyage from Buckie to Königsberg, Prussia.
Robert Lees	United Kingdom	The full-rigged ship ran aground in the Hooghly River. She was on a voyage from London to Calcutta, India. She had been refloated by 20 September.
Scioto	United States	The 389-ton screw steamer collided with Arctic (Flag unknown) and sank in Lake Erie at Dunkirk, New York.
White Jacket	United Kingdom	The ship collided with John Chism (United Kingdom) and was beached in the Hooghly River. She was refloated and taken in to Calcutta, India.

== 3 September ==
List of shipwrecks: 3 September 1864
Ship	State	Description
B. De Wolfe	United Kingdom	The ship was severely damaged by an onboard explosion at Belfast, County Antrim. She was on a voyage from Liverpool, Lancashire to Bermuda.
Blue Bell	United Kingdom	The brig was driven onto the Penny Steel, on the coast of Yorkshire. She was on a voyage from Hartlepool, County Durham to Shoreham-by-Sea, Sussex. She was refloated the next day and resumed her voyage.
USS Brandywine	United States Navy	The receiving ship was destroyed by an accidental fire at the Gosport Navy Yard, Portsmouth, Virginia.
Oriental Queen	United Kingdom	The ship was sighted off Anjer, Netherlands East Indies whilst on a voyage from Sunderland, County Durham to Shanghai, China. No further trace, presumed foundered in a typhoon in the South China Sea with the loss of all hands.
Oscar	Hamburg	The barque was driven ashore and wrecked at Niuzhuang, China.
Pomona	Stettin	The brig was driven ashore north of Helsingør, Denmark. She was on a voyage from Newport, Monmouthshire, United Kingdom to Swinemünde, Prussia. She was refloated and resumed her voyage.
William and Susan	United Kingdom	The schooner was abandoned in the North Sea 40 nautical miles (74 km) off Hartlepool, County Durham with the loss of all hands. Loss notified by a message in a bottle which washed up at Bergen, Norway in February 1865.

== 4 September ==
List of shipwrecks: 4 September 1862
Ship	State	Description
Agnes Louisa	United Kingdom	American Civil War, Union blockade: The 578-ton sidewheel paddle steamer was wrecked on Hog Island, Bahamas while outbound for a blockade-running voyage to Charleston, South Carolina, Confederate States of America. She apparently became a total loss
Martha Johanna	Hamburg	The ship was driven ashore on Texel, North Holland, Netherlands. She was on a voyage from Buenos Aires, Argentina to Hamburg.
Unnamed	United Kingdom	The sloop was wrecked on Taylor's Bank, in Liverpool Bay with the loss of all hands.

== 5 September ==
List of shipwrecks: 5 September 1864
Ship	State	Description
HMS Adventure	Royal Navy	The storeship collided with the full-rigged ship Mary Whitridge (United States), the brig Gravina (Spain) and the full-rigged ships Arrow and Arratoon Apear (both United Kingdom) at Hong Kong and was severely damaged.
Aeolus	Netherlands	The schooner collided with the barque Jupiter (Russia) and sank in the North Sea. Her crew were rescued. Aeolus was on a voyage from Saint Petersburg, Russia to the Koogerpolder, North Holland.
Anna	Kingdom of Hanover	The ship foundered at sea. Her crew were rescued by Engelina (Flag unknown). Anna was on a voyage from Langeoog to "Ondeen".
Annie	United States	The barque ran aground on the Long Sedge, off the coast of Massachusetts. She was on a voyage from New Orleans, Louisiana, Confederate States of America to Boston, Massachusetts. She was refloated.
Catherine	United Kingdom	The ship was driven ashore at Maryport, Cumberland. Her crew were rescued. She was on a voyage from Maryport to Belfast, County Antrim.
Celerity	United Kingdom	The brigantine was wrecked on the Isle of Lewis, Outer Hebrides. Her five crew were rescued. She was on a voyage from Newcastle upon Tyne, Northumberland to Drogheda, County Louth.
David	United Kingdom	The schooner ran ashore at Workington, Cumberland. She was on a voyage from Workington to Dublin.
Devereux	United Kingdom	The barque was wrecked at Tory Island, County Donegal with the loss of a crew member. Survivors were rescued by the steamship Lion (United Kingdom). Devereux was on a voyage from Quebec City, Province of Canada, British North America to the Strangford Lough.
Elise	France	The schooner collided with the full-rigged ship Victory (United Kingdom) and sank in the English Channel off Beachy Head Sussex, United Kingdom with the loss of a crew member. Survivors were rescued by Victory. Elise was on a voyage from Sunderland, County Durham to Libourne, Gironde.
Governor McLean	United Kingdom	The brig ran aground on the Owers Sandbank, in the English Channel. Her twelve crew were rescued by the Selsey Lifeboat and a lugger. She was on a voyage from Africa to London. She was refloated by the Selsey Lifeboat. Governor McLean was towed in to Portsmouth, Hampshire in a waterlogged condition by the steamship Antagonist (United Kingdom).
Graf von Arnhem	Prussia	The ship was driven ashore and wrecked at Thisted, Denmark with the loss of two of her eleven crew. She was on a voyage from Wolgast to Sunderland.
Henry Fitzhugh	United States	Laid up at the mouth of the Licking River in Kentucky, the 217-ton sternwheel paddle steamer capsized when the river flooded. Her cabin broke free after she capsized.
HMS Perseus	Royal Navy	Bombardment of Kagoshima: The Camelion-class sloop ran aground at Kagoshima, Empire of Japan.
Sir George Grey	United Kingdom	The tug was beached at New Ferry, Cheshire.
Unnamed	Sweden	The steamship was driven ashore on Heligoland.

== 6 September ==
List of shipwrecks: 6 September 1864
Ship	State	Description
Armide	France	The ship was wrecked at "Nanganbo", Puerto Rico.
Assof	Flag unknown	The ship foundered off the Dudgeon Sandbank, in the North Sea. Her crew were rescued.
Beaufront	United Kingdom	The ship was sighted in the South China Sea whilst on a voyage from Sunderland, County Durham to Hong Kong and Shanghai, China. No further trace, presumed foundered with the loss of all hands.
Charity	United Kingdom	The ship foundered off the Dudgeon Sandbank. Her crew were rescued.
Countess of Durham	United Kingdom	The steamship ran aground in the River Thames at Blackwall, Middlesex. She was refloated.
Janet Patterson	United Kingdom	The ship sank off Formby, Lancashire. Her crew survived. She was on a voyage from Bowling, Dunbartonshire to Runcorn, Cheshire.
Margaretha Hillechina	Netherlands	The ship was wrecked near Rügenwalde, Prussia.
Rose Marguerite	France	The barque ran aground in the Caicos Islands. She was on a voyage from Cap-Haïtien, Haiti to Havre de Grâce, Seine-Inférieure. She was later refloated and resumed her voyage.

== 7 September ==
List of shipwrecks: 7 September 1864
Ship	State	Description
Celinie	France	The ship ran aground in the Hooghly River. She was on a voyage from Réunion to Calcutta, India. She was refloated and taken in to Calcutta.
Circassian	United Kingdom	The barque was wrecked on the Gunfleet Sand, in the North Sea off the coast of Essex. Her crew were rescued by a smack.
Elizabeth	United Kingdom	The ship ran aground at Landskrona, Sweden. She was refloated the next day and taken in to Landskrona.
Flower	United Kingdom	The smack was run down and sunk by a tug off the Cloch Lighthouse, Renfrewshire. Her two crew survived.
Great Tasmania	United Kingdom	The full-rigged ship ran aground in the Hooghly River. She was on a voyage from London to Calcutta. She was refloated and taken in to Calcutta.
Haabet	Norway	The yacht collided with the barque Frederick (United Kingdom) and sank at Swinemünde, Prussia.
Triumph	United Kingdom	The schooner struck rocks at Lindisfarne, Northumberland and sank. She was on a voyage from Dundee, Forfarshire to Newcastle upon Tyne, Northumberland.
Waterhuizen	Netherlands	The schooner was lost at Alvarado, Mexico. She was on a voyage from "Chiltepec", in the Gulf of Mexico to a British port.
Unnamed	United Kingdom	The brig ran aground on the Gunfleet Sand.

== 8 September ==
List of shipwrecks: 8 September 1864
Ship	State	Description
Allies, and Lightning	United Kingdom	The ships collided in the Hooghly River and were both driven ashore. They were refloated and resumed their voyages.
Anna Maria	Denmark	The brig was driven ashore near Christiansø. Her crew were rescued. She was on a voyage from Windau, Prussia to Fosdyke Bridge, Lincolnshire, United Kingdom.
Fire Sodskende	Danzig	The ship collided with Tjapka (Netherlands) and was abandoned off Hela, Prussia. Her crew were rescued by Tjapka. Fire Sodskende was on a voyage from Königsberg, Prussia to Granton, Lothian, United Kingdom.
Surprise	United Kingdom	The fishing lugger was run down and sunk by the steamship Imperial (United Kingdom). Her crew were rescued.
Witham	United Kingdom	The brig was wrecked on the Gunfleet Sand, in the North Sea off the coast of Essex. Her crew were rescued. She was on a voyage from Newcastle upon Tyne, Northumberland to London.
William	United Kingdom	The schooner sprang a leak and was abandoned in the North Sea 7 nautical miles (13 km) east of the Longstone Lighthouse, Northumberland. Her crew were rescued by the schooner Mary and Margaret (United Kingdom). William was on a voyage from South Shields, County Durham to Burntisland, Fife. She sank 8 nautical miles (15 km) east south east of the Longstone Lighthouse.

== 9 September ==
List of shipwrecks: 9 September 1864
Ship	State	Description
Annie Grieve	United Kingdom	The brigantine was wrecked in Cow Bay. Her crew were rescued. she was on a voyage from Barbados to Sydney, Nova Scotia, British North America.
Fawn	United States	American Civil War: The steamboat was captured and burned by sailors from the ironclad ram CSS Albemarle (Confederate States Navy) and Confederate guerrillas at the Currituck Bridge in the Dismal Swamp Canal in Virginia with the loss of one killed and several wounded.
Fleda	United Kingdom	The barque was driven ashore and wrecked in Agra Bay, Japan. She was on a voyage from Yokohama, Japan to London.
General Washington	United Kingdom	The ship foundered in the North Sea off Aldeburgh, Suffolk. Her crew were rescued. She was on a voyage from Sunderland, County Durham to Calais, France.
Reaper	United Kingdom	The ship ran aground near "Kroserost". She was on a voyage from Vyborg, Grand Duchy of Finland to London. She was refloated and put in to Fredrikshavn, Denmark in a severely leaky condition.

== 10 September ==
List of shipwrecks: 10 September 1864
Ship	State	Description
Clipper	United Kingdom	The ship was driven ashore at Peterhead, Aberdeenshire. She was on a voyage from Sunderland, County Durham to Peterhead. She was refloated on 7 October and taken in to Peterhead for repairs.
E. D.	United Kingdom	The schooner was driven ashore at Waterloo, Lancashire.
Florie	Confederate States of America	The 349-gross register ton sidewheel paddle steamer was lost when she struck a wreck on the Cape Fear River in North Carolina.
Lanarkshire	United Kingdom	The barque was abandoned in the Atlantic Ocean. Her crew were rescued on 15 September by Laura and Gertruda (Netherlands). Lanarkshire was on a voyage from Quebec City, Province of Canada, British North America to Bristol, Gloucestershire.
Lexington	United Kingdom	The barque caught fire at Nassau, Bahamas and was scuttled. She was on a voyage from New York, United States to Nassau. She was refloated.
Peregrine	United Kingdom	The ship was driven ashore at Youghal, County Cork. She was on a voyage from Youghal to Cardiff, Glamorgan.
Vittoria	United Kingdom	The ship was sighted off Amoy, China whilst on a voyage from Calcutta, India to Shanghai, China. No further trace, presumed foundered with the loss of all hands.
William Bateman	United Kingdom	The ship ran aground in the River Tees at "Newport-on-the-Sea", County Durham. She was on a voyage from Quebec City, Province of Canada, British North America to Stockton-on-Tees, County Durham. She was refloated and taken in tow for Stockton-on-Tees.

== 11 September ==
List of shipwrecks: 11 September 1864
Ship	State	Description
Cambria	United Kingdom	The brig ran aground on the Doan Aslan Shoal, in the Sea of Marmara. She was on a voyage from the Clyde to Odesa. She was refloated on 14 September with the assistance of a tug.

== 12 September ==
List of shipwrecks: 12 September 1864
Ship	State	Description
Aurora	United Kingdom	The brig foundered off the Dudgeon Sandbank, in the North Sea. Her crew survived. She was on a voyage from Sunderland, County Durham to London.
Electra	United Kingdom	The ship departed from Constantinople, Ottoman Empire for a British port. No further trace, presumed foundered with loss of all hands.
John J. Roe	United States	American Civil War: Carrying the 2nd Wisconsin Cavalry Regiment (Union Army), the 691-ton sidewheel paddle steamer struck a snag and sank up to her roof in the Mississippi River above New Madrid, Missouri, killing 165 of the regiment′s horses.
Latona	United Kingdom	The full-rigged ship ran aground on the Diamond Sand, in the Hooghly River. She was on a voyage from London to Calcutta, India. She was refloated and taken in to Calcutta.
Onangondy	India	The ship ran aground in the Hooghly River. She was refloated.
Rauha	Sweden	The schooner was driven ashore and wrecked near Blokhus, Denmark. Her crew were rescued. She was on a voyage from Kalmar to London, United Kingdom.
Robert Stephenson	United Kingdom	The brig ran aground in the Dardanelles. She was on a voyage from Troon, Ayrshire to Odesa. She was refloated the next day.
Scotia	United Kingdom	The schooner was driven ashore at Cape Helles, in the Dardanelles. She was on a voyage from London to Constantinople, Ottoman Empire. She was refloated with the assistance of a steamship.
Unnamed	United Kingdom	The ship was driven ashore on Sanda Island, in the Firth of Clyde.

== 13 September ==
List of shipwrecks: 13 September 1864
Ship	State	Description
USS Alice C. Price	United States Navy	American Civil War: A Confederate mine sank the sidewheel transport in the St. Johns River near Mandarin Point, Florida, 8 miles above Jacksonville, Florida, Confederate States of America. Machinery and fixtures were salvaged.
Antina	Denmark	The ship was driven ashore at Ringkøbing.
Equity	United Kingdom	The ship was driven ashore at Aberayron, Cardiganshire. She was on a voyage from Aberayron to Ayr. She was refloated and taken in to Aberayron.
Scindia	United Kingdom	The ship was abandoned in the Indian Ocean. Her crew were rescued by Silver Eagle (United Kingdom). Scindia was on her maiden voyage, from Calcutta to London. She was discovered derelict by Aminta and Alicia Annie (both United Kingdom) on 15 September and was taken in to Algoa Bay.

== 14 September ==
List of shipwrecks: 14 September 1864
Ship	State	Description
Porto Novo	United Kingdom	The ship was wrecked on English Point, Province of Canada, British North America. Her crew were rescued. She was on a voyage from Cardiff, Glamorgan to Quebec City, Province of Canada.
Sarah	United Kingdom	The schooner sprang a leak and foundered 12 nautical miles (22 km) south south east of St. John's Point, County Antrim. Her crew survived. She was on a voyage from Bridgwater, Somerset to Ardrossan, Ayrshire.
Stadt Kammin	Prussia	The ship ran aground on the Middlegrund, in the Baltic Sea. She was refloated.
Twe Brodre	Flag unknown	The ship was driven ashore at Castillos, Uruguay. She was on a voyage from Newport, Monmouthshire, United Kingdom to Buenos Aires, Argentina.

== 15 September ==
List of shipwrecks: 15 September 1864
Ship	State	Description
Belina	United Kingdom	The ship ran aground at Paraíba, Brazil. She was on a voyage from Maranhão, Brazil to Cayenne, British Guiana and Liverpool, Lancashire. She was refloated on 18 September but was consequently condemned.
British Queen	United Kingdom	The ship ran aground on the Goree Island Reef. She was on a voyage from the Clyde to Quebec City, Province of Canada, British North America.
Cora Linn	United Kingdom	The ship ran aground on the Pluckington Bank, in Liverpool Bay. She was on a voyage from Quebec City to Liverpool. She was refloated and taken in to Liverpool.
Enterprise	United Kingdom	The schooner struck the Wolves Rock and was beached at Penarth Head, Glamorgan. She was on a voyage from Newport, Monmouthshire to Belfast, County Antrim. She was refloated and towed in to Cardiff, Glamorgan in a leaky condition.
Forfarshire	United Kingdom	The ship was wrecked off Robben Island, Cape Colony. She was on a voyage from Liverpool, Lancashire to Calcutta, India.
Secret	United Kingdom	The smack was driven ashore near Tor Cross, Devon.
Star of Hope	United Kingdom	The ship was driven ashore and wrecked on Cruise Island, Province of Canada. She was on a voyage from Liverpool to Montreal, Province of Canada. She was later refloated and taken in to Quebec City, where she arrived on 20 September.
Thomas Fielden	United Kingdom	The ship was driven ashore at "St. Michael's", Province of Canada.
Unnamed	United Kingdom	The schooner was driven ashore between "Ain-el-Jusk" and Mers El Kébir, Algeria.

== 16 September ==
List of shipwrecks: 16 September 1864
Ship	State	Description
Beaver	United Kingdom	The ship was driven ashore on "Stamnio", Denmark. She was on a voyage from Vyborg, Grand Duchy of Finland to Wisbech, Cambridgeshire.
Mary Tatham	United Kingdom	The schooner was driven against the breakwater at Holyhead Anglesey and was severely damaged. She was refloated the next day and taken in to Holyhead for repairs.
Sarah Ellen	United Kingdom	The ship was driven ashore on Mutton Island, County Galway. She was refloated and resumed her voyage.

== 17 September ==
List of shipwrecks: 17 September 1864
Ship	State	Description
Phoenix	United Kingdom	The brig ran aground on the Middlegrund, in the Baltic Sea. She was on a voyage from Skellefteå, Sweden to Palma de Mallorca, Spain.
Twilling Brodrene	Denmark	The ship ran aground at Peterhead, Aberdeenshire, United Kingdom. She was on a voyage from Aalborg to Peterhead. She was refloated and taken into Peterhead in a severely leaky condition.

== 18 September ==
List of shipwrecks: 18 September 1864
Ship	State	Description
Crocodile	United Kingdom	The schooner was wrecked at Griffin's Cove, British North America. Her crew were rescued. She was on a voyage from Liverpool, Lancashire to Quebec City, Province of Canada, British North America.
Lancaster	United Kingdom	The ship ran aground on the Patch Sand, in the North Sea off the coast of Norfolk. She was refloated with the assistance of a tug and resumed her voyage.
Mary	United States	The barque was wrecked in Uda Bay in the western Sea of Okhotsk during a gale. She was sold to Otto Wilhelm Lindholm, who salvaged some of the wreck in 1865.
Sarah Jane	Liberia	The schooner was lost off Rock Town Point. All on board were rescued.
Truro	United Kingdom	The ship was driven ashore north of Taiwanfoo, Formosa. She was on a voyage from Shanghai, China to Manila, Spanish East Indies.
Unnamed	United Kingdom	The brig ran aground at Blackpool, Lancashire. Her crew were rescued by the Blackpool Lifeboat.

== 19 September ==
List of shipwrecks: 19 September 1864
Ship	State	Description
Inca	Peru	The ship ran aground in the River Tyne. She was refloated and beached.
Industrious	Malta	The brig ran aground and was wrecked off Port Eynon, Glamorgan. Her crew survived. She was on a voyage from Llanelli, Glamorgan to Malta.
Island Queen	United States	American Civil War: The steamer was captured and burned in Lake Erie off Middle Bass Island, Ohio, by Confederate agents aboard the captured steamer Philo Parsons (United States).
Pelham	United Kingdom	The ship ran aground at Whitby, Yorkshire. She was on a voyage from Quebec City, Province of Canada, British North America to Whitby.
Philo Parsons	United States	American Civil War: The steamer was captured by Confederate agents in Lake Erie. Later in the day, they burned her off Sandusky, Ohio.
Prince Albert	United Kingdom	The ship was driven ashore in the Sea of Marmora. She was on a voyage from Taganrog, Russia to Sunderland, County Durham. She was later refloated.
Queen Royal	United Kingdom	The fishing smack foundered in the North Sea. Her three crew were rescued by Amitie (France).
Snodland	United Kingdom	The Thames barge was run into by the steamship Sentinel (United Kingdom) and sank in the River Thames.
Thomas and Sarah	United Kingdom	The Thames barge was run into by the steamship Sentinel and sank in the River Thames.
Sylph	United Kingdom	The ship ran aground on the Burbo Bank, in Liverpool Bay. She was on a voyage from Pomeron, Portugal to Garston, Lancashire. She was refloated and taken in to Liverpool, Lancashire in a leaky condition.
Tory	United Kingdom	The ship was wrecked on Sommers, Grand Duchy of Finland. Her crew were rescued. She was on a voyage from London to Saint Petersburg, Russia.

== 20 September ==
List of shipwrecks: 20 September 1864
Ship	State	Description
Edinburgh Castle	United Kingdom	The ship ran aground on the Arklow Bank, in the Irish Sea off the coast of County Wicklow. She was on a voyage from the Clyde to Singapore, Straits Settlements. She was refloated the next day and put back to Greenock, Renfrewshire in a leaky condition.
Eliza Ann	United Kingdom	The ship was driven ashore and wrecked at Cloughy, County Down. She was on a voyage from Whitehaven Cumberland to Portrush, County Antrim. She was refloated on 6 October and taken in to Strangford, County Down.
Emma Annie Williams	United Kingdom	The ship was driven ashore near Caernarfon. She was on a voyage from Caernarfon to London. She was refloated the next day.
Mary	United Kingdom	The schooner struck a sunken wreck and foundered in the Bristol Channel. Her crew survived. She was on a voyage from Cardiff, Glamorgan to Liverpool, Lancashire.
Palmyra	United Kingdom	The ship was wrecked on the Folle Reefs. She was on a voyage from Liverpool to Havana, Cuba.
Sally	United Kingdom	The schooner was driven ashore at Cloughy. She was on a voyage from Troon, Ayrshire to Dublin.

== 21 September ==
List of shipwrecks: 21 September 1864
Ship	State	Description
Amelie	France	The ship was damaged by fire at Marseille, Bouches-du-Rhône.
Atalanta	United Kingdom	The ship was driven ashore at Emmanuel Head, Northumberland. She was on a voyage from Lindisfarne to Berwick upon Tweed. She was refloated the next day.
Ellen	United Kingdom	The schooner ran aground on the Longsand, in the North Sea off the coast of Essex. She was on a voyage from Ipswich, to Barmouth, Merionethshire. She was refloated with assistance from Increase (United Kingdom) and taken in to Harwich, Essex in a leaky condition.
George and Mary	United Kingdom	The brig ran aground 8 nautical miles (15 km) north of the Hom Reef, in the North Sea. She was on a voyage from Newcastle upon Tyne, Northumberland to Hamburg.
Gertrude	United States	The 70-ton sidewheel paddle steamer foundered at College Point, Louisiana with the loss of six lives.
Gratitude	United Kingdom	The ship ran aground at Carlingford, County Louth. She was on a voyage from Greenock, Renfrewshire to Bristol, Gloucestershire. She was refloated.
Paul	United Kingdom	The schooner was driven ashore at Holyhead, Anglesey. She was on a voyage from Liverpool, Lancashire to Plymouth, Devon.

== 22 September ==
List of shipwrecks: 22 September 1864
Ship	State	Description
Abyssinian	United Kingdom	The ship ran aground in Besika Bay. She was refloated and towed in to the Dardanelles.
James	United Kingdom	The brig caught fire at Glasgow, Renfrewshire. She was towed to a mooring in the Clyde and was scuttled. She was severely damaged.
Oliviera	Portugal	The barque ran aground and was wrecked off Coquet Island, Northumberland, United Kingdom. She was on a voyage from Macduff, Aberdeenshire to Newcastle upon Tyne, Northumberland.
Pera	United Kingdom	The full-rigged ship ran aground on a reef off the coast of Madagascar (23°07′S 47°45′E) and was wrecked. She was abandoned by her 33 crew the next day; they took to three boats. One boat reached land, those in the second boat were rescued by Sea Nymph (United Kingdom). those in the third boat were rescued by the schooner Marie Camielle (France. Pera was on a voyage from Liverpool, Lancashire to Bombay, India.

== 23 September ==
List of shipwrecks: 23 September 1864
Ship	State	Description
Agnes Davidson	United Kingdom	The steamship ran ashore on Læsø, Denmark. She was on a voyage from Tayport, Fifie to Danzig. She was refloated on 28 September and taken in to Helsingør, Denmark.
Andrew	United Kingdom	The schooner was driven ashore at Wick, Caithness. She was on a voyage from Wick to Thurso, Caithness. She was refloated and put back to Wick.
USS Antelope	United States Navy	American Civil War: The sternwheel paddle steamer was beached in a sinking condition after striking a snag in the Mississippi River above New Orleans, Louisiana, and subsequently was stripped and abandoned.
Energy	United Kingdom	The schooner sprang a leak and was beached at Lamlash, Isle of Arran. She was on a voyage from Glasgow, Renfrewshire to Londonderry.
Lavina Logan	United States	The 145-ton sternwheel paddle steamer was lost on the Mississippi River.
Wilhelmina	Bremen	The brig was run into by a barque and was damaged. She then ran aground on the Longsand, in the North Sea off the coast of Essex, United Kingdom. She was on a voyage from Bremen to Alexandria, Egypt. She was refloated with the assistance of a smack and was assisted in to Harwich, Essex.

== 24 September ==
List of shipwrecks: 24 September 1864
Ship	State	Description
Crusader	United Kingdom	The barque was abandoned off "Wanshaw", China in a typhoon. Her eleven crew took to a boat, and were subsequently rescued 130 nautical miles (240 km) south east of Formosa. She was on her maiden voyage, from South Shields, County Durham to Shanghai, China.
De Brus	Netherlands	The steamship was driven ashore near Brielle, South Holland. She was on a voyage from Whitehaven, Cumberland, United Kingdom to Rotterdam, South Holland.
Jacobina	Netherlands	The koff was driven ashore by ice in Hirsholmene, Denmark. She was on a voyage from an English port to a Baltic port. She was refloated and taken in to Fredrikshavn, Denmark in a leaky condition.
Lord Raglan	United Kingdom	The steamship was driven ashore near Brielle. She was on a voyage from Rotterdam to Newcastle upon Tyne, Northumberland.
Marie	Kingdom of Hanover	The koff was driven ashore by ice in Hirsholmene. She was on a voyage from an English port to a Baltic port. She was refloated and taken in to Fredrikshavn.
Thornley	United Kingdom	The brig collided with the steamship Admiral (United Kingdom) and sank in the River Thames at Charlton, Kent. She was refloated a month later and beached.

== 25 September ==
List of shipwrecks: 25 September 1864
Ship	State	Description
City of Ningpo	United Kingdom	The ship ran aground in the Hooghly River. She was refloated and resumed her voyage.
Jehangier	India	The ship ran aground in the Hooghly River. She was refloated and resumed her voyage.
Lynx	Confederate States of America	American Civil War, Union blockade: The steamer, a blockade runner carrying a cargo of cotton, was set ablaze off Wilmington, North Carolina, by gunfire from the screw steamers USS Howquah and USS Niphon and the hermaphrodite brig USS Governor Buckingham (all United States Navy) and chased ashore, where the fire destroyed her during the ensuing night. Her crew escaped, although one crew member was wounded by a sharpshooter aboard one of the U.S. Navy ships.

== 26 September ==
List of shipwrecks: 26 September 1864
Ship	State	Description
Enterprise	United Kingdom	The ship was driven ashore on the coast of Norfolk. She was on a voyage from Newcastle upon Tyne, Northumberland to Calcutta, India. She was refloated and taken in to Great Yarmouth, Norfolk in a leaky condition.
Lynx	United Kingdom	American Civil War, Union blockade: Chased by the hermaphrodite brig USS Governor Buckingham and the armed screw steamers USS Howquah and USS Niphon (all United States Navy) while attempting to run the Union blockade with a cargo of cotton, gold, and Confederate bonds, the 372-gross register ton sidewheel paddle steamer took several shell hits from the pursuing warships while crossing New Inlet Bar and ran aground 5 nautical miles (9.3 km) north of Fort Fisher, North Carolina, Confederate States of America. Her crew set her on fire and the American warships continued to shell her, killing one person on board and wounding another. The fire and shelling destroyed her.
Mandamis, or Mondamin	United States	American Civil War: The barque, in ballast, was captured and destroyed in the North Atlantic Ocean off the northeast coast of South America by the screw sloop-of-war CSS Florida (Confederate States Navy).
Mangina	Netherlands	The sloop foundered in the North Sea. Her crew were rescued by the barque Fortuna (Sweden). Mangina was on a voyage from Riga, Russia to London, United Kingdom.
Mary Celestia	United Kingdom	American Civil War, Union blockade: During a blockade-running voyage with a cargo of bacon, rifle-muskets, and ammunition, the Confederate chartered 314-gross register ton sidewheel paddle steamer struck a rock off Bermuda just south of the Gibbs Hill Lighthouse and sank in less than eight minutes in 60 feet (18 m) of water (32°12′10″N 64°42′15″W). The Cook died.
Mary Edwards	United Kingdom	The brigantine sprang a leak and foundered in the English Channel off the South Foreland, Kent. Her crew were rescued. She was on a voyage from Middlesbrough, Yorkshire to Havre de Grâce, Seine-Inférieure, France.
Pet	United Kingdom	The ship capsized in the River Liffey. She was on a voyage from Dublin to Bristol, Gloucestershire. She was righted on 28 September.

== 27 September ==
List of shipwrecks: 27 September 1864
Ship	State	Description
Adelina Eliza	France	The ship was sighted in the Atlantic Ocean whilst on a voyage from Bordeaux, Gironde to Hong Kong. No further trace, presumed foundered with the loss of all hands.
Albion	United Kingdom	The smack collided with the steamship Shamrock (United Kingdom) and sank off the Cumbrae Lighthouse, Ayrshire. Her crew were rescued. She was on a voyage from Port Dundas, Renfrewshire to Cork.
Anne Cecilia	Denmark	The schooner collided with another vessel and foundered off Smith's Knoll, in the North Sea off the coast of Norfolk, United Kingdom. Her crew were rescued by the schooner Shamrog (Norway). Anne Cecilia was on a voyage from Hamburg to London, United Kingdom.
Argus	United Kingdom	The schooner sank 17 nautical miles (31 km) south west of Cape Teluda, Sardinia, Italy. Her crew were rescued. She was on a voyage from Agrigento, Sicily to Falmouth, Cornwall.
Bob Chambers	United Kingdom	The paddle tug ran aground on a rock off Arbroath, Forfarshire and was damaged. She was refloated the next day and taken in to Arbroath. Subsequently taken in to Montrose, Forfarshire for repairs.
CSS North Carolina	Confederate States Navy	Suffering from a number of bad leaks due to poor hull construction, the casemate ironclad foundered near the mouth of the Cape Fear River off Smithville, North Carolina (33°54′49″N 78°01′08″W).
Woodman	United Kingdom	The ship was driven ashore at Maryport, Cumberland. She was on a voyage from Maryport to Belfast, County Antrim.
Unidentified boats	Confederate States of America	American Civil War, Union blockade: A Union flotilla destroyed 17 Confederate boats on the Potomac River in Charles County, Maryland.
Unnamed	Sweden	The schooner ran aground on the Kallebodstrand. She was refloated with the assistance of a steamship but consequently sank off "Amack".

== 28 September ==
List of shipwrecks: 28 September 1864
Ship	State	Description
Lady Alice Lambton	United Kingdom	The steamship, a collier, collided with the steamship Henry Morton (United Kingdom) and sank off the Nore. Her crew were rescued by Henry Morton. Lady Alice Lambton was on a voyage from Sunderland, County Durham to London.
Powerful	United Kingdom	The steamship ran aground at Bermuda. She was on a voyage from Bermuda to Liverpool, Lancashire. She was refloated and resumed her voyage. Powerful put in to Holyhead, Anglesey on 26 October in a severely leaky condition.
Wave	United Kingdom	The steamship struck a submerged object in the Humber and was beached at Hull, Yorkshire. Her passengers were taken off before she sank. She was on a voyage from Ferriby Sluice, Lincolnshire to Hull.

== 29 September ==
List of shipwrecks: 29 September 1864
Ship	State	Description
Betsey	United Kingdom	The ship sank in Angle Bay. She had been refloated by 28 October and taken in to Milford Haven, Pembrokeshire for repairs.
Emulation	Norway	The brig ran aground on the Cross Sand, in the North Sea off the coast of Norfolk, United Kingdom struck a sunken wreck and sank. Her crew were rescued. She was on a voyage from Lillesand to London, United Kingdom.
Heureux	France	The brig was abandoned in the Mediterranean Sea. Her crew were rescued by the brig Dee (United Kingdom). Heureux was on a voyage from Marseille, Bouches-du-Rhône to Port Said, Egypt.
Leon	France	The ship struck the Normande Rock. She was on a voyage from Swansea, Glamorgan to Nantes, Loire-Inférieure. She was refloated and put in to Havre de Grâce, Seine-Inférieure for repairs.
Night Hawk	United Kingdom	American Civil War, Union blockade: The steamer, a blockade runner, was forced aground and burned off Fort Fisher, North Carolina, Confederate States of America by the screw steamer USS Niphon (United States Navy). She had been refloated by 8 November.
Osprey	(United Kingdom of Great Britain and Ireland) New Zealand	The 40-ton schooner was wrecked at Blind Bay on Great Barrier Island while carrying timber from Port Fitzroy to Auckland.
Tasman, or Tunisian	United Kingdom	The barque was driven ashore at Cardiff, Glamorgan. She was refloated.

== 30 September ==
List of shipwrecks: 30 September 1864
Ship	State	Description
Elizabeth Lewis	United Kingdom	The ship was driven ashore and wrecked at Kunda, Russia.
Johanna	Kingdom of Hanover	The ship was driven ashore and wrecked at the mouth of the Aalbek. She was on a voyage from Königsberg, Prussia to Emden.
Juno	Stettin	The ship was driven ashore and wrecked near Swinemünde, Prussia. She was on a voyage from Newcastle upon Tyne, Northumberland to Swinemünde. She was refloated and taken in to Swinemünde.
Louise Hassett	United Kingdom	The ship was driven ashore near "Port Neuf", British North America. Her crew were rescued.
Mary	United Kingdom	The ship sprang a leak and was beached at Waterford. She was on a voyage from Runcorn, Cheshire to Cork.
Ogdensburg	United States	The 352-ton screw steamer sank after colliding with the schooner Snow Bird (United States) at Fairport, Ohio. All 32 people on board were rescued.

== Unknown date ==
List of shipwrecks: Unknown date in September 1864
Ship	State	Description
Ange	United Kingdom	The ship struck rocks and sank at Alexandria, Egypt. She was on a voyage from Newcastle upon Tyne, Northumberland to Alexandria.
Anne Marie	Flag unknown	The ship ran aground on the Hats.
Berkshire	United Kingdom	The ship was wrecked on Main Reef. She was on a voyage from Belize City, British Guiana to Plymouth, Devon.
Briton Ferry	United Kingdom	The steamship was driven ashore and sank near the Black Head, Cornwall. Her crew were rescued. She was on a voyage from Havre de Grâce, Seine-Inférieure, France to Swansea, Glamorgan.
Carl	United Kingdom	The ship was lost in the Strait of Belle Isle before 20 September. She was on a voyage from Quebec City, Province of Canada, British North America to the Clyde.
Celt	United Kingdom	The ship sank in the Baltic Sea off Öland, Sweden. Her crew survived. She was on a voyage from Kronstadt, Russia to London.
Eleanor	United Kingdom	The ship was wrecked at Ponce, Puerto Rico.
Erinagh	United Kingdom	The ship foundered off Isle Ornsay, Outer Hebrides before 4 September.
Emilie Chien	France	The steamship was wrecked.
Energy	United Kingdom	The ship foundered. She was on a voyage from Middlesbrough, Yorkshire to Danzig.
Gaynare	Flag Unknown	The ship was lost near Spiekeroog, Kingdom of Hanover. She was on a voyage from Bayonne, Basses-Pyrénées to Hamburg.
Heda	China	The ship was lost in the Bay of Shimōsa, Japan.
Jane Spoors	United Kingdom	The brig ran aground on the Long Nose. She was on a voyage from South Shields, County Durham to Honfleur, Calvados, France. She was refloated on 12 September with the assistance of the tug Mystery (United Kingdom) and resumed her voyage.
Jarrow	United Kingdom	The steamship ran aground and sank near Lerberget, Sweden. She was on a voyage from Hull, Yorkshire to Kronstadt. She was later refloated and taken in to Helsingør, Denmark, where she arrived on 28 September in a severely damaged condition.
Juno	United Kingdom	The ship was driven ashore near Dragør, Denmark. She was on a voyage from Riga, Russia to Bristol, Gloucestershire. She was refloated and put in to Copenhagen, Denmark.
Lady Washington	United States	The ship was wrecked on Bakers Island, Maine before 3 September.
Latimer	United Kingdom	The brig was wrecked on Hiiumaa, Russia with the loss of all but one of her crew.
London	United Kingdom	The ship was destroyed by fire at Söderhamn, Sweden.
Malvina	Flag unknown	The ship ran aground on the Hats.
Margaret	United Kingdom	The ship was wrecked off Inishbofin, County Donegal in early September.
Marksman	(United Kingdom of Great Britain and Ireland) British North America	The ship was wrecked on Grey Island, Newfoundland. She was on a voyage from Harbour Grace to a port in Labrador
Nordstjernen	Norway	The schooner collided with Amy Louise (United Kingdom) and was abandoned. She was on a voyage from Christiania to Somme, Somme, France.
Osiris	Prussia	The schooner foundered 5 nautical miles (9.3 km) offshore. Her crew were rescued by Vier Bruder (Flag unknown) and a Dutch vessel. She was on a voyage from Newcastle upon Tyne to Rügenwalde, Prussia.
USS Picket Boat No. 2	United States Navy	During a voyage from New York City to Hampton Roads, Virginia, the screw torpedo boat sank on rocks near Bergen Point, New Jersey. She was refloated, repaired, and returned to service.
Platte Valley	United States	The sidewheel paddle steamer sank in the Mississippi River at Devil's Island. She later was refloated.
Rhea	United Kingdom	The ship ran aground at Memel, Prussia. She was on a voyage from Torrevieja, Spain to Memel. She was refloated and taken in to Memel in a severely leaky condition.
Roodee	India	The ship was driven ashore at Woosung, China. She was on a voyage from Calcutta to Shanghai, China.
Salem	United Kingdom	The ship was driven ashore on Neufähr, Prussia. She was on a voyage from Hamburg to Danzig. She was refloated on 16 September and completed her voyage.
Sea Horse	United Kingdom	The ship was lost in the Sunda Strait. Her crew were rescued. She was on a voyage from Liverpool, Lancashire to Shanghai.
Silver Oar	United Kingdom	The brigantine ran aground on the Sandy Cay Reef before 24 September. She was on a voyage from Havana, Cuba to Falmouth, Cornwall. She was refloated and taken in to Nassau, Bahamas.
Sophia	United Kingdom	The ship ran aground on the Haisborough Sands, in the North Sea off the coast of Norfolk. She was on a voyage from Amsterdam North Holland, Netherlands to London. She was refloated and taken in to Great Yarmouth, Norfolk.
Three Brothers	(United Kingdom of Great Britain and Ireland) New Zealand	The schooner hit the sandbar at the mouth of Mangawhai Harbour. Two passengers were washed overboard and drowned.
Tommie Hussey	United States	The ship was run down and sunk in the Atlantic Ocean. Her crew took to three boats. All were swamped with the loss of all but one man, who was rescued more than four days later by a French ship. She was on a voyage from Troon, Ayrshire, United Kingdom to Portland, Maine.
Transit	United Kingdom	The ship was lost in the Baltic Sea with the loss of all but six of her crew.
Trial	(United Kingdom of Great Britain and Ireland) British North America	The ship was wrecked on Belle Isle, Newfoundland before 15 September. She was on a voyage from Harbour Grace to a port in Labrador.
Vorwaerts	Prussia	The ship collided with Catherine Richards (United Kingdom off Hela and was abandoned. She was on a voyage from Danzig to Stettin. She was subsequently taken in to Pillau.
Washoe	United States	The 385- or 500-ton steamer was sunk by a boiler explosion above the Hog's Back in Steamboat Slough, California, Confederate States of America on 4 or 5 September, killing 36 people and seriously injuring another 36, several of whom later died. She was later refloated and repaired.
RMS Wye	United Kingdom	The steamship ran aground on a reef off Nevis. She was refloated.
