= Ceres (blockade runner) =

American Civil War vessel

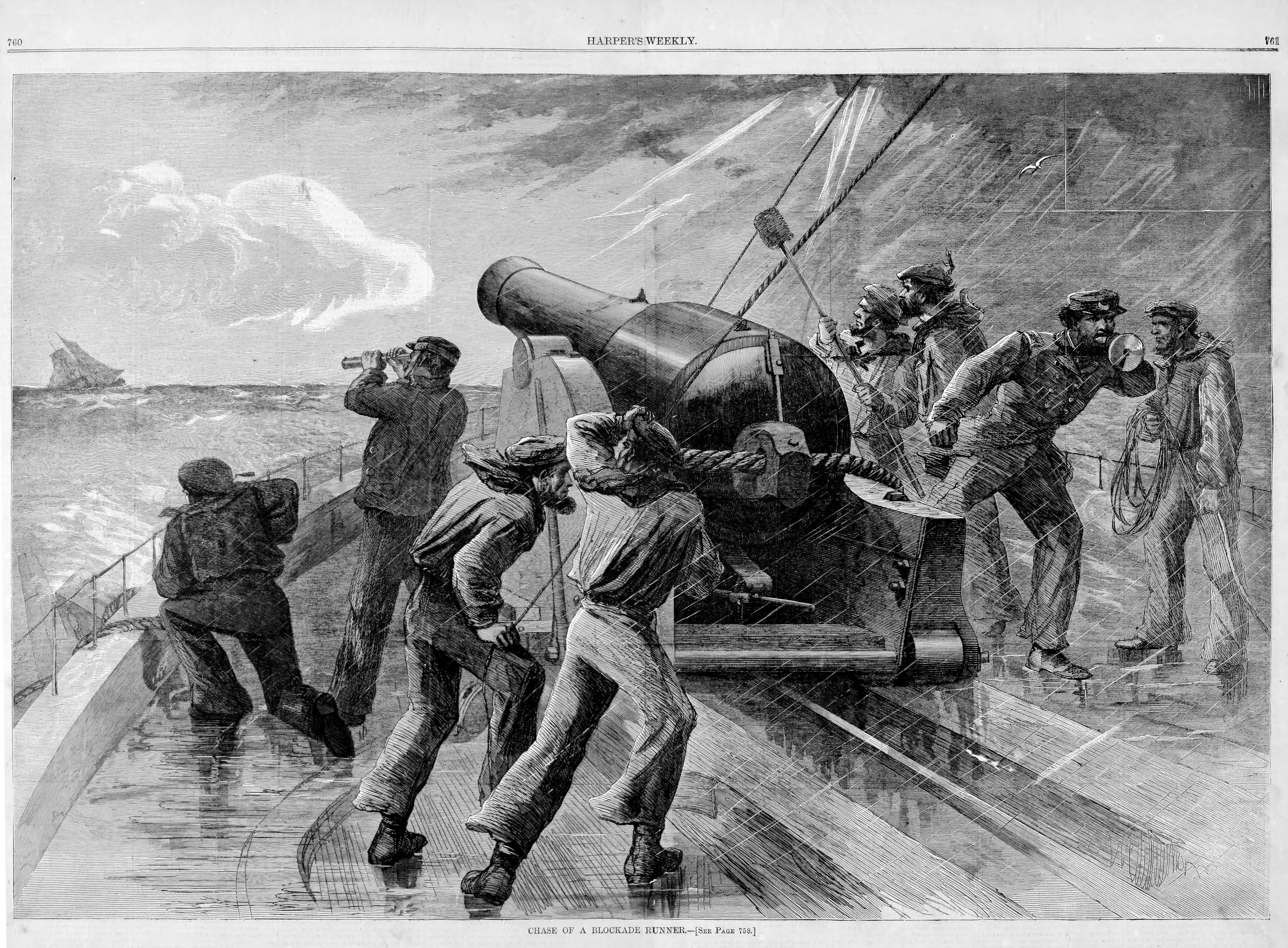
"Chase of a Blockade Runner" (unidentified artist, Harper's Weekly, November 26, 1864)

Ceres was a blockade runner of the American Civil War. After Ceres was abandoned near the mouth of the Cape Fear River in North Carolina in December 1863, U.S. Navy officers searched the burning ship and found documents belonging to C. A. L. Lamar that revealed several important details about the business of blockade running.

== Description ==
Ceres had been built in Britain and had an iron propeller. The steamer of 300 tons burden was captured by the U.S. Navy off the coast of Wilmington, North Carolina on December 6, 1863, while inbound for a Confederate States port. She had sailed from Bermuda. Vesta, wrecked on a North Carolina inlet in January 1864, was described as a "fine-looking double-propeller" ship that was nearly identical to Ceres.

== Capture ==
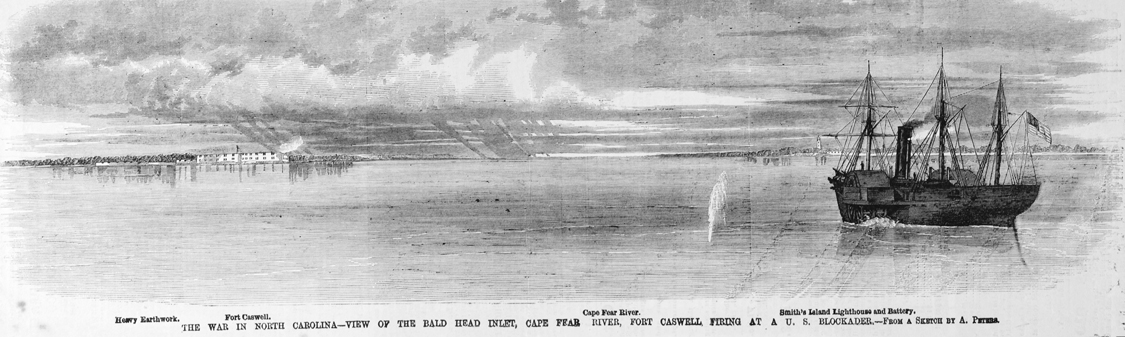
"The War in North Carolina: View of Bald Head Islet (Frank Leslie's Illustrated Newspaper, March 19, 1864)

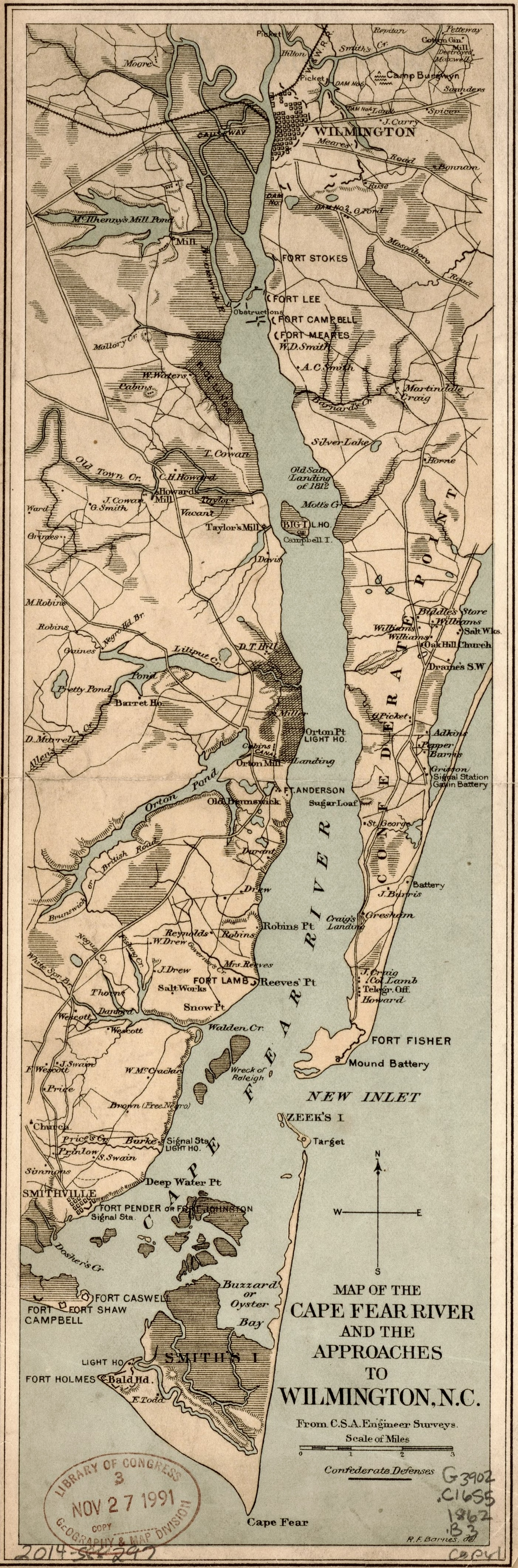
Map of the Cape Fear River and the approaches to Wilmington, N.C. - from C.S.A. Engineer Surveys (LOC 2014588297)

According to the after-action reports, Ceres "got aground on the Smith's Island side at the edge of the shoal bank S. W. by S. of Bald Head light-house. At daybreak boats were dispatched to her," namely USS Aries and USS Violet.

According to a message from acting naval ensigns James A. Brannan and George M. Smith, "In obedience to your orders we boarded a vessel which was aground and on fire off Bald Head light-house. When we got on board we set the men at work with fire buckets to try and quench the flames, but our efforts were unavailing, the fire gaining on us, then entered the cabin, broke open a bureau in the captain's stateroom, and found several letters, together with some papers; also a sextant. By this time the rebel batteries had opened fire on us, and we deemed it prudent to shove off from her. Arriving on board this vessel, all the papers were delivered to you."

== Lamar correspondence ==
U.S. Navy admiral Samuel Phillips Lee (cousin of Robert E. Lee, as it happens) wrote that Commander John Jay Almy of the USS Connecticut had reported that "Mr. Brannan has charge of all the papers found on board, among which are letters in relation to Messrs. Hartstene, Maffitt, and Fry, formerly in our naval service (no particular given); also mercantile letters from one Frank Smith at Bermuda implicating parties in New York as engaged in negotiations to purchase on rebel account the R. E. Lee and Cornubia (prize steamers) when offered for sale. The package, also, I am informed, contains an important letter from Judge P. Pecquet, from Paris, October 16, and another letter from N. C. Trowbridge, of New York, October 9; also a letterbook belonging to Colonel Lamar, from which it appears that Maffitt had visited Sweden to purchase a vessel. Commander Almy thinks Colonel Lamar was a passenger on board the Ceres." Almy was correct. Charles Augustus Lafayette Lamar was a Georgia slave trader who had been a leading figure in organizing the illegal transatlantic slave ship Wanderer in 1858, and who had since transitioned to blockade running with the support of longtime business partner N. C. Trowbridge, as well as periodically dabbling in Confederate States Army service. Lamar, L. G. Bowers, and Lamar's cousin Lucius Quintus Cincinnatus Lamar, the Confederate ambassador to Russia, had sailed from Liverpool in November 1864, transferring at Bermuda for the final leg of the trip on board the Ceres.

Admiral Lee, writing to U. S. Secretary of the Navy Gideon Welles from aboard the flagship USS Minnesota on December 18, 1863, divided the captured intelligence into five groups:

- A - [These] "are of interest as showing the basis of rebel operations in inducing English capitalists to venture in the blockade-running business; and it will be seen by letters in the same schedule that parties in Bermuda are endeavoring to purchase the prize steamers R. E. Lee and Margaret and Jessie, with the intention of again employing them in breaking the blockade."
- B - These documents "give an insight into rebel stock operations in England, the parties concerned in them, and the method pursued by them in raising money on cotton and interesting English capitalists and owners in their ventures."
- C - These letters "refer to operations tending to running the blockade at Matamoras, and contain statements as to the knowledge, consent, and patronage of the Emperor of the French in such operations."
- D - These letters are "addressed by parties living in New York, who seem to have some connection with the rebels in their procuring supplies, etc., from New York."
- E - Letters from "various parties on private business and domestic affairs, from which it appears that Captain [John Newland] Maffitt has gone to Sweden to purchase steamers for running the blockade, and that Captain [Henry J.] Hartstene has been stricken with paralysis and unfitted for further employment."

Secretary Welles mentioned the tranche of correspondence from the Ceres in his diary entry of December 21. The letters triggered a cabinet meeting with Edwin Stanton, William Seward, and Salmon P. Chase. At least one letter was in cipher and had been partially decoded; there was an implication that Confederates were planning to capture some of the "California steamers" for use as blockade runners. Welles ordered the arrest of New Yorker N. C. Trowbridge and "and hold him in close custody, and to Admiral Paulding to place a gunboat in the Narrows and at Throg's Neck to stop all outward-bound steamers that have not a pass." Trowbridge was indeed arrested and shortly convicted on charges of treason; he was sentenced to 10 years hard labor.

== "The slave-trader's letter book" ==
In 1886 an unsigned article appeared in the North American Review that examined a letter book belonging to Charles Lamar. The article began with the following explanation: "It was my fortune, during my summer's vacation, to rescue from the obliterating maw of a New England paper-mill, a letterpress copy-book, containing impressions of a series of remarkable letters, written by a prominent 'Southern gentleman' of 'the days before the war.' Happening to glance over the contents of the book, I saw it had once been the property of Mr. C. A. L. Lamar, of Savannah, Georgia, a cousin, I believe, of Hon. L. Q. C. Lamar, our present United States Secretary of the Interior. It must have been confiscated during 'Sherman's march to the sea,' and brought North. It fell, I suppose, into unappreciative hands, or else it would have been utilized before this time, and not so carelessly doomed to destruction."

This article became the basis for years of scholarship on the illegal transatlantic slave ship the Wanderer and the antebellum interregional American slave trade. It was also controversial. Was it an elaborate political attack on the Grover Cleveland administration? Was the "paper mill" story believable? Where was this purported book? Scholarly debate continued for decades, with no end in sight, until in 2009 when a New Jersey woman clearing out her home contacted scholars about three trunks of Lamar family documents in her possession. There, wrote historian Jim Jordan, "Toward the close of the second day of my visit, bleary-eyed from sifting through so many documents, I opened a volume about nine by eleven inches, almost an inch thick, with a black cover and red binding, and saw that it contained copies of letters. I read one and got a feeling of déjà vu—I had seen it before. The correspondence bore the signature of C. A. L. Lamar. Another letter also sounded familiar and was signed by Charles Lamar. Then I realized that these were verbatim from the article in the North American Review. The book that I held was the actual 'Slave-Trader's Letter-Book,' not seen by anyone for perhaps 125 years. The article was not a fraud." Jordan concluded that the paper mill story was in fact a ruse but while in fact the writer came into possession of the book when "either the Treasury or War Department" had possession of a large number of confiscated papers that had belonged to Fire-Eater Gazaway Bugg Lamar, secessionist, businessman, and father of C. A. L. Lamar, papers that eventually ended up in the possession of heirs who lived in New Jersey.

It remains unclear if the C. A. L. Lamar letterbook that was taken from the burning blockade runner Ceres in 1863 is the same C. A. L. Lamar letterbook reported in the North American Review in 1886 and rediscovered in New Jersey in 2009.

== See also ==
- Lucy Chase and Sarah Chase, Quaker schoolteachers who took the letters of slave trader R. H. Dickinson from a building in Richmond
- Charles Carleton Coffin, a journalist who took the letters of slave trader Ziba B. Oakes from a slave mart in Charleston

== Sources ==
- n.a. (November 1886). "A Slave-Trader's Letter-Book". The North American Review. 143 (360): 447–461. ISSN 0029-2397. JSTOR 25101128.
- Jordan, Jim (2018). The Slave-Trader's Letter-Book: Charles Lamar, the Wanderer, and Other Tales of the African Slave Trade. Uncivil Wars Series. Athens, Georgia: University of Georgia Press. ISBN 978-0-8203-5196-4. LCCN 2017959392. OCLC 981118367.
- Price, Marcus W. (July 1948). "Ships That Tested the Blockade of the Carolina Ports, 1861–1865". American Neptune. VIII (3). Salem, Massachusetts: 196–241 – via HathiTrust, digitized by Google from University of Michigan Libraries.
- Sprunt, James (1920). Derelicts: An Account of Ships Lost at Sea in General Commercial Traffic and a Brief History of Blockade Runners Stranded Along the North Carolina Coast, 1861–1865. Wilmington, N.C. and Baltimore, Maryland: Lord Baltimore Press – via HathiTrust, digitized by Google Books from Harvard University Libraries.
- "Capture of the British steamer Ceres at the mouth of the Cape Fear River, December 6, 1863". Official Records of the Union and Confederate Navies in the War of the Rebellion. Vol. 9: North Atlantic Blockading Squadron from May 5, 1863 to May 5, 1864. Washington, D.C.: U.S. Government Printing Office. 1899. pp. 336–339 – via HathiTrust.
- Welles, Gideon (1911). Welles, Edgar T. (ed.). Diary of Gideon Welles, Secretary of the Navy Under Lincoln and Johnson. Vol. II (April 1, 1864–December 31, 1866). Boston: Houghton Mifflin Co. LCCN 38034416. OCLC 795127753. OL 6379113M.
