= USS Aries (1863) =

Gunboat of the United States Navy

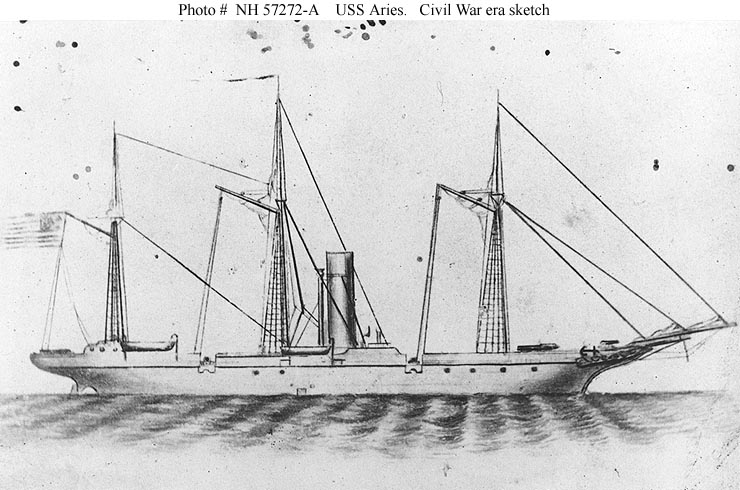
- USS Aries, civil war era sketch.

History
- Namesake: Aries (constellation)
- Builder: James Laing's Deptford yard, Sunderland, England
- Laid down: 1861
- Launched: 1862
- Acquired: 20 May 1863
- Commissioned: 25 July 1863 at the Boston Navy Yard
- Decommissioned: 14 June 1865 at the Boston Navy Yard
- Captured: by Union Navy forces, 28 March 1863
- Fate: Sold 1 August 1865 and Scrapped in 1908

General characteristics
- Displacement: 820 tons
- Length: 201 ft (61 m)
- Beam: 27.8 ft (8.5 m)
- Draft: 15.7 ft (4.8 m)
- Propulsion: Steam engine; Screw-propelled
- Speed: 12 knots (22 km/h; 14 mph)
- Complement: 90
- Armament: 4 × 8 in (203 mm) smoothbore guns; 1 × 30-pounder Parrott rifle; 1 × 12-pounder rifle

USS Aries was an 820-ton iron screw steamer built at Sunderland, England, during 1861–1862, intended for employment as a blockade runner during the American Civil War. She was captured by Union Navy forces during the Union blockade of the Confederate States of America, and was commissioned as a Union gunboat. Aries was named for the constellation.

Although sold by the United States Navy post-war in 1865, Aries – the first ship to bear that name for the U.S. Navy – continued her work in the merchant service for nearly half a century, before being scrapped in 1908.

== Service history ==
=== Initial service and capture ===
The first U.S. Navy ship to bear the name Aries, she was laid down in 1861 at Sunderland, England, by James Laing's Deptford yard. Built during the American Civil War in the hope that she would be purchased by persons planning to break the Union blockade of the South, this iron-hulled, screw steamer was completed in 1862 and sold later that year to Frederic Peter Obicino of London, England. She has resold, apparently sometime in 1863, to the Cuban firm, V. Malga & Cie, of Havana, Cuba. Almost no records of her career as a blockade runner seem to have survived, but we know that Aries did enter that chancy business, for a Confederate report on cotton exports between 1 November 1862 and 31 May 1863 states that she carried 740 tons of cotton out of either Wilmington, North Carolina, or Charleston, South Carolina. The number of her voyages to the South is unknown; and, in any case, her efforts to supply the Confederacy ended on 28 March 1863.

Shortly after midnight, lookouts on screw steamer Stettin – herself an erstwhile blockade runner now, following capture, turned blockader – spotted Aries off Bull's Bay, South Carolina, attempting to slip through the blockade with a cargo of liquor. The Union screw gunboat immediately weighed anchor and gave chase. When the runner was within range, Stettin opened fire on Aries and continued the pursuit until shoal water forced her to anchor. At daybreak, Stettin's commanding officer, Acting Master Edward F. Devens, saw that his quarry had run ashore on the south end of Petrel Bank. He immediately lowered two boats, and, "...taking command in person... went on board and took possession of her as a prize to the U.S. Government." Since the blockade runner was aground astern, Devens had her cargo shifted forward; and the stranded steamer floated free with the rising tide.

Devens took Aries via Charleston to Port Royal, South Carolina, where Rear Admiral Samuel Francis DuPont stated that she "...is the most perfect example of a blockade runner we have yet seen – her masts lower in a peculiar way, invented for this very purpose." He ordered her north for adjudication in admiralty court and, since Devens was ill, detached him from Stettin and placed him in charge of the prize crew for the voyage to Boston, where she was condemned and purchased there by the Navy on 20 May 1863.

=== Union Navy operations ===
==== 1863 ====
While Aries was being fitted out for service in the Union Navy, Lt. Charles W. Read, CSN, in the prize Clarence, captured the bark Tacony; shifted his crew to her as a better vessel; and began a cruise north and off the New England shoreline in which he terrorized Union shipping and frightened Northern coastal cities. To still the clamor of frightened citizens for protection from this "rebel pirate," Secretary of the Navy Gideon Welles sent out a number of warships in pursuit of the commerce raider and promised that Aries would soon join them. However, before Aries was ready for sea, other Union warships closed in on Read and compelled him to surrender his force. Aries was placed in commission at the Boston Navy Yard on 25 July 1863, Acting Vol. Lt. Edward F. Devens in command. On the day of her commissioning, the screw steamer sailed for Port Royal, carrying 200 men: marines to help Rear Admiral John A. Dahlgren build up his forces for a renewed attack on Fort Wagner which guarded the seaward approaches to Charleston. After disembarking her passengers, she got underway again for Fortress Monroe, Virginia, carrying word that Dahlgren's coal had been exhausted and that "... a supply can not be forwarded too soon." From Hampton Roads, Virginia, Aries proceeded to New York City where she took on board two hundred more men for the South Atlantic Blockading Squadron, before heading south once more.

After delivering these replacements at Port Royal, she embarked some 100 passengers—mostly either sailors who were too ill to remain in a fighting zone or men whose periods of enlistment had expired. However, during her voyage north, she encountered a fearful storm off Cape Lookout, North Carolina, on 27 August and suffered engine failure while fighting its waves. The wind was so severe that Comdr. John J. Almy – the commanding officer of Connecticut which chanced upon the disabled Aries on 1 September – described the weather as worse "... than I ever recollect to have seen it in the course of my sea service of more than twenty-one years." The commanding officer of another Union warship, Pocahontas stated that "... had the hurricane ... continued with unabated force much longer this ship (Pocahontas) could not have outlived it..." Connecticut took Aries in tow and proceeded via Beaufort, North Carolina, to Hampton Roads, Virginia, where they arrived on the 6th. Two days later, the screw steamer Daylight arrived and towed Aries to Baltimore, Maryland, for repairs.

Early in November, as the yard work on Aries was approaching completion, Secretary of the Navy Gideon Welles ordered Devens to proceed in her to the waters off Wilmington, for duty in the North Atlantic Blockading Squadron. Her first action in this new assignment began at daybreak on 6 December when one of her lookouts spotted a steamer aground on Western Bar near Smith's Island, North Carolina. Aries got underway immediately and headed for the stranded blockade runner which soon proved to be the new British, iron-hulled, screw-propelled steamer Ceres which had departed Bermuda on the 3d and had struck bottom while attempting to slip into the Cape Fear River sometime on the night of the 5th and 6th. When shoal water compelled Aries to heave to, Devens launched two boats which continued on to the blazing Ceres.

Upon boarding the prize, the boat parties set to work with fire buckets trying to quench the flames and stuck to the task despite fire from Southern batteries ashore. Meanwhile, the officers in charge of the boats broke into the captain's cabin and found a number of papers which contained highly valuable intelligence. Finally – after realizing that, despite the diligent efforts of the Union bluejackets, the flames were gaining on the bucket handlers – the boat parties withdrew from the British blockade runner and returned to their own ship. That night, the rising tide refloated Ceres; and, early the following morning, observers on the blockaders could see her drifting seaward. A boat's crew from Maratanza boarded the prize, anchored her in safe water, and – with men from Aries, Violet, and Connecticut – put out the remaining fires. Aries then towed the erstwhile blockade runner to Beaufort, the prize's first stop on a voyage via Hampton Roads to Washington, D.C. for adjudication.

After delivering Ceres to Beaufort, Aries returned to blockade duty off Wilmington. At dawn on 20 December, men on board the ship sighted steam rising from a strange vessel, some four miles away to the east, southeast. Shortly thereafter, Union blockader Governor Buckingham, appeared, closing the potential prize while Aries joined in the pursuit. As she neared shoal waters, Aries anchored in four fathoms of water and sent an armed boat bearing a boarding party to the blockade runner. They learned that the stranger was the Confederate blockade runner Antonio which previously had won considerable renown under the names Lamar and Herald playing a cat-and-mouse game with Federal blockaders as she carried contraband cargo into Southern ports and escaped to sea, laden each time with between 1,000 and 1,200 bales of cotton.

The night before she had been taking the part of the mouse as she ran aground while attempting to slip into the Cape Fear River with a cargo consisting primarily of potable spirits. After brief efforts to pull free proved futile, Capt. W. F. Adair, the commander of the steamer, ordered his crew to abandon their ship and to head for the nearest land in boats, hoping to reach shore before daylight. However, they were spotted by Union blockader Governor Buckingham and captured by that steamer and the Federal tug Violet. Men from Aries and from several other Union ships remained on board Antonio, for the next few days laboring in vain to refloat the prize. When rising water in the grounded and damaged steamer's hull made it clear that the effort could not possibly succeed, the Federal sailors finally left the ship on Christmas Eve.

==== 1864 ====
Aries' next adventure came at the end of the first week of 1864. Shortly after daybreak on 7 January, while his ship was lying within the entrance of Little River, North Carolina, Devens "...discovered a strange steamer standing to the E.S.E., with the Montgomery (1861) in chase of her..." Aries immediately got underway to join in the pursuit and gained on the stranger. Weather was bad and, about 8:20 a.m., thick fog settled and hid the fleeing steamer. When it lifted a bit over an hour later, the chase was considerably closer than she had been when last seen. Aries opened fire, and her shot fell close to the target. This accuracy prompted the blockade runner to haul "... to the westward..." However, the steamer ran aground close to North Inlet, near Georgetown, South Carolina; and her crew escaped to shore. Closing fast, Aries came to anchor to avoid being stranded herself and "...immediately sent two armed boats to board the steamer and get her off." High surf thwarted their efforts to refloat the prize, so the boats' crews set the vessel afire and returned to Aries with word that the blockade runner was the Confederate steamer Dare. Unfortunately, Aries second cutter swamped in the surf during the expedition resulting in the capture of two of its officers and seven enlisted men by Confederate forces. A boat from Montgomery also capsized with the loss of two officers and fourteen men who were imprisoned.

On the evening of 10 January, orders reached Lt. Devens to send his boats to assist Iron Age which had run aground that morning while attempting to refloat the stranded blockade runner Bendigo near Lockwood's Folly Inlet. About midnight, her boats – along with some from Minnesota, Daylight, and Governor Buckingham – received the officers and men of the doomed Union screw steamer. The following morning, 11 January, Aries joined Minnesota, Daylight, and Governor Buckingham in chasing the blockade runner Ranger which was attempting to enter the Cape Fear River with a cargo from Newcastle upon Tyne, England. The Northern ships drove the steamer aground where she was abandoned by her crew. However, their efforts to refloat Ranger as a prize were stopped by Southern sharpshooters "...whose fire completely commanded her (Ranger's) decks." Since it was impossible to take possession of Ranger, the Union sailors burned her.

While these actions were taking place, black smoke was spotted in the direction of Shallotte Inlet. Aries, which had been withdrawn from her station in that quarter the previous night, was sent to investigate. She soon came across "... a fine-looking double propeller blockade runner, resembling Ceres, beached and on fire between Tubb's and Little River Inlets ..." Once more Southern sharpshooters prevented Union parties from boarding the steamer, extinguishing the flames, and taking possession of the prize. The next day, after the riflemen had withdrawn, Devens did manage to board the ship and learned that she was Vesta, a sister ship of Ceres. However, serious damage to her hull made it impossible to refloat the blockade runner, and her two anchors were his only booty. Aries' next lively action came two months later. On 14 March, she and State of Georgia drove a large, long, and low side-wheel steamer ashore on the west point of Oak Island, near the Western Bar, off Wilmington. Their approach to the unidentified potential prize – which resembled the recently captured North Carolina blockade runner A. D. Vance – was ended by shelling from Southern shore batteries.

Much of the spring and summer, Aries was out of action undergoing repairs; but she returned to duty off Wilmington in September. On 28 October, she assisted Eolus and Calypso in capturing the English steamer Lady Sterling. Again on the night of 6 November, Aries "...discovered a strange steamer ...", immediately gave chase, opened fire on the stranger, and threw rockets to the eastward, indicating his course. Nevertheless, despite assistance in the pursuit by Maratanza and Eolus and the blockade runner's being briefly stranded, a rising tide and clever seamanship enabled the steamer to escape to safety in Wilmington. On 3 December, Aries joined five other ships in shelling blockade running steamer Ella which Union blockader Emma had forced aground on Marshall Shoal, Smith's Island, North Carolina, "... placing her in a condition which rendered it impossible to get her off..."

Years of labor and the endurance of tedium by the sailors who manned the Union warships on blockade duty were finally strangling the Confederacy. Not only were more and more blockade runners being destroyed and captured, but joint Army-Navy operations were snatching one seaport after another from the South. As the year 1864 drew to a close, only one major port remained in Confederate hands, Wilmington, where Aries had served almost exclusively since entering the Union Navy. And, at that time, plans were well advanced for an amphibious attack against Fort Fisher which guarded that last center of Southern maritime activity. Aries was in the reserve division of a vast task force which departed Beaufort on 18 December and headed for the mouth of the Cape Fear River. Troops went ashore on Christmas Eve and seriously threatened Fort Fisher; but the Army commander, Major General Benjamin F. Butler, feared that his troops could not cope with the Southern forces that defended the Confederate works. As a result, he ordered his men to re-embark.

==== 1865 ====
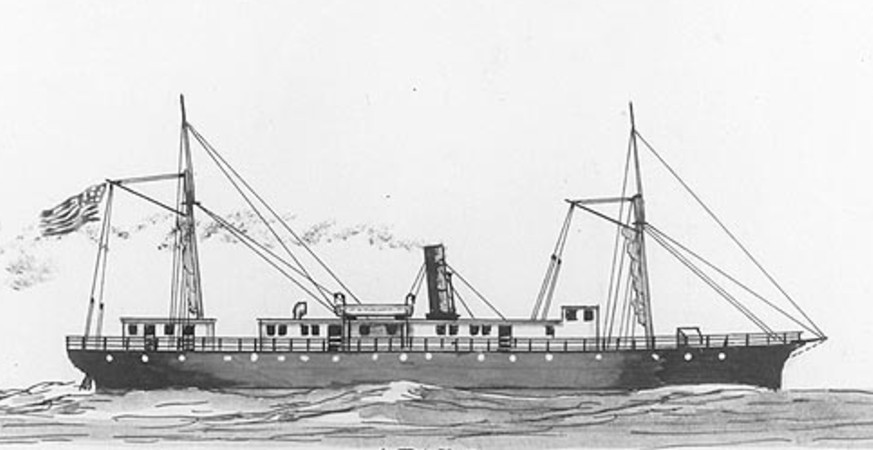
USS Aries after the American Civil War

Dissatisfied with Butler's lack of resolution, Rear Admiral David Dixon Porter – the commander of the naval forces in the operation – pressed Washington, D.C., for a renewed attack. Early in January 1865, a mighty force was assembled for a new effort against Fort Fisher. Aries, although again assigned to the reserve division, helped to land troops on the 13th and, once they were ashore, supported the troops for the next two days. The defenders finally capitulated on the 15th, shutting off the South from all foreign aid. The Confederacy was now doomed. After supporting mopping up operations in the vicinity of Wilmington for the remainder of January and all of February, Aries departed Hampton Roads on the morning of 5 March and headed for Key West, Florida, to join the East Gulf Blockading Squadron. However, when she reached Florida waters, her machinery necessitated her remaining in port undergoing repairs into May. She was then sent to sea to cruise off Havana to intercept CSS Stonewall should that Confederate raider attempt to escape to sea. After Stonewall's commanding officer, Capt. Thomas Jefferson Page, learned of the end of the war and turned his ship over to Spanish authorities,

Aries returned to Key West. On 1 June, she was ordered to Boston where she was decommissioned at the Boston Navy Yard on the 14th of that month. Sold at public auction at Boston on 1 August 1865 to Sprague, Soule & Co., the steamer was documented on 12 August 1865 as SS Aries. She retained her original name throughout a long career in merchant service carrying freight between Philadelphia, Pennsylvania, and New England ports. She was sold in 1908 for scrapping.

== See also ==
- Confederate States Navy
