= USS Violet =

Gunboat of the United States Navy

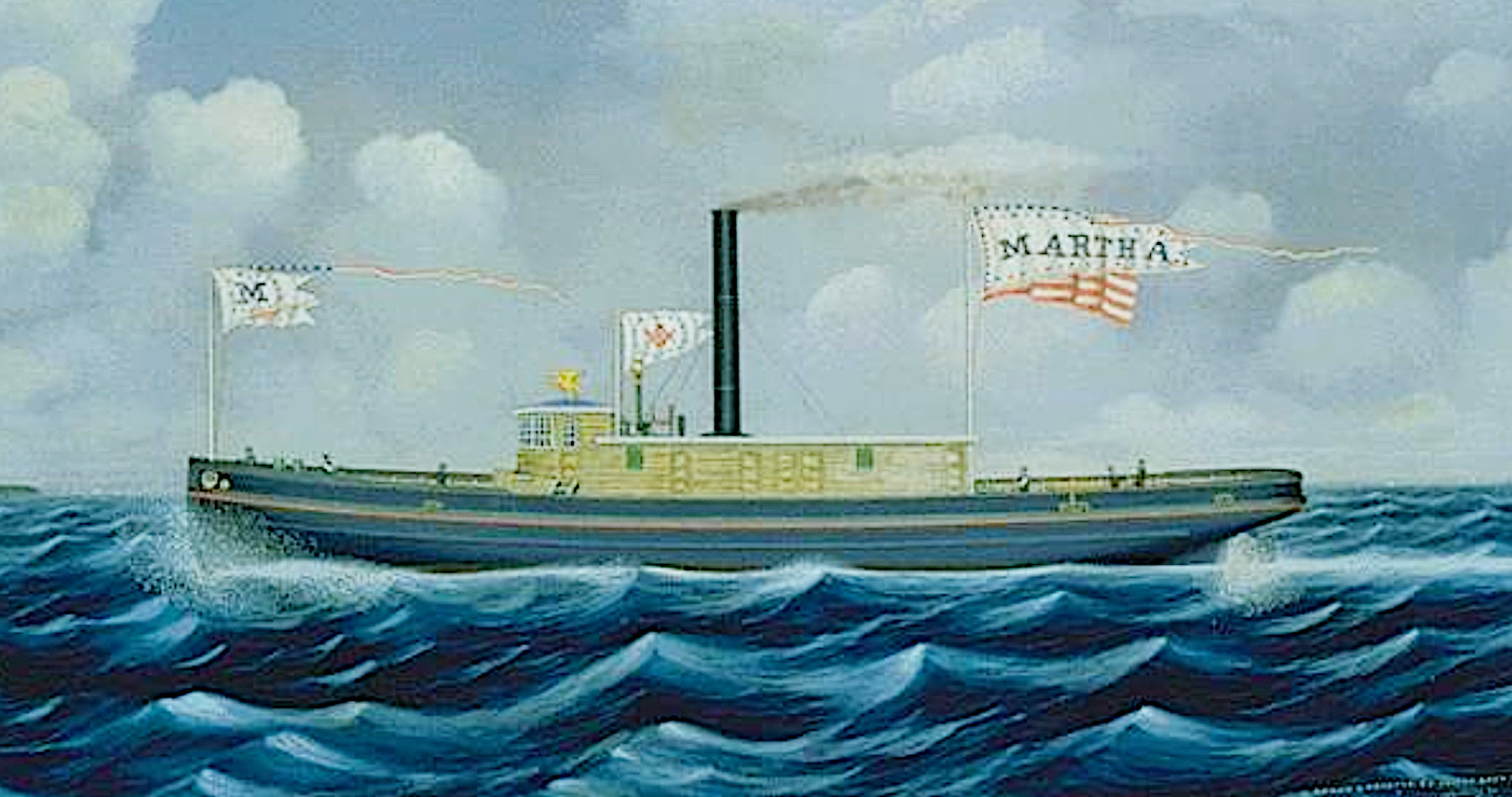
- The tugboat Martha prior to her service as USS Violet

History

United States
- Name: USS Violet
- Builder: Lawrence & Foulks, Williamsburg, NY
- Cost: $23,500
- Acquired: 29 December 1862
- Commissioned: 29 January 1863
- Fate: Blown up to prevent capture, 8 August 1864

General characteristics
- Displacement: 166 tons
- Length: 85 ft (26 m)
- Beam: 19 ft 9 in (6.02 m)
- Depth of hold: 11 ft (130 in)
- Installed power: Single-cylinder steam engine
- Propulsion: Propeller
- Armament: 2 × 12-pounder rifle; 1 x 24-pounder; 1 × torpedo (1864)

USS Violet was a wooden-hulled, propeller-driven steamship, originally built as the tugboat Martha in 1862. She was purchased by the U.S. Navy in late 1862 for use in the American Civil War. She served on the U.S. East Coast in the Union blockade of the Confederate States of America, most notably at the entrance to the Cape Fear River which led to Wilmington, North Carolina. There she had several encounters with blockade runners. In August 1864 she went aground under the guns of the Confederate fort guarding the western entrance to the river. Rather than risk Violet's capture, the ship was blown up by her own men.

== Construction and characteristics ==
Martha was built at the shipyard of Lawrence & Foulks in the Williamsburg section of Brooklyn, New York. Her hull was built of wood. She was 85 feet (26 m) long, with a beam of 19 ft 9 in (6.02 m), and a depth of hold of 11 feet (3.4 m). She displaced 166 tons.

She had a single steam engine for propulsion. It was an inverted, direct-acting engine with a single cylinder which was 30 inches (76 cm) in diameter, and a stroke of 28 inches (71 cm). Steam was produced by a single coal-fired boiler. The ship's machinery drove a single propeller.

Her naval complement was 20 men, led by an acting ensign.

== Purchase by the U.S. Navy ==
Martha was registered at the Port of New York on 24 December 1862. She was purchased for the Navy by Rear Admiral Hiram Paulding on 29 December 1862 for $23,500. Her name was changed to Violet upon the sale. Since only five days elapsed between her registration and purchase, it seems likely that Martha had no commercial career and was delivered to the Navy as a brand new ship.

She was readied for naval service at the Brooklyn Navy Yard and commissioned there on 29 January 1863. A heavy 12-pounder gun and a 12-pounder rifle were installed. Her battery was later upgraded to three guns, two 12-pounder rifles and a 24-pounder. In 1864 she was fitted with a spar torpedo, basically a bomb on a pole. This was criticized as unlikely to work beyond sheltered waters.

== Civil War operations ==
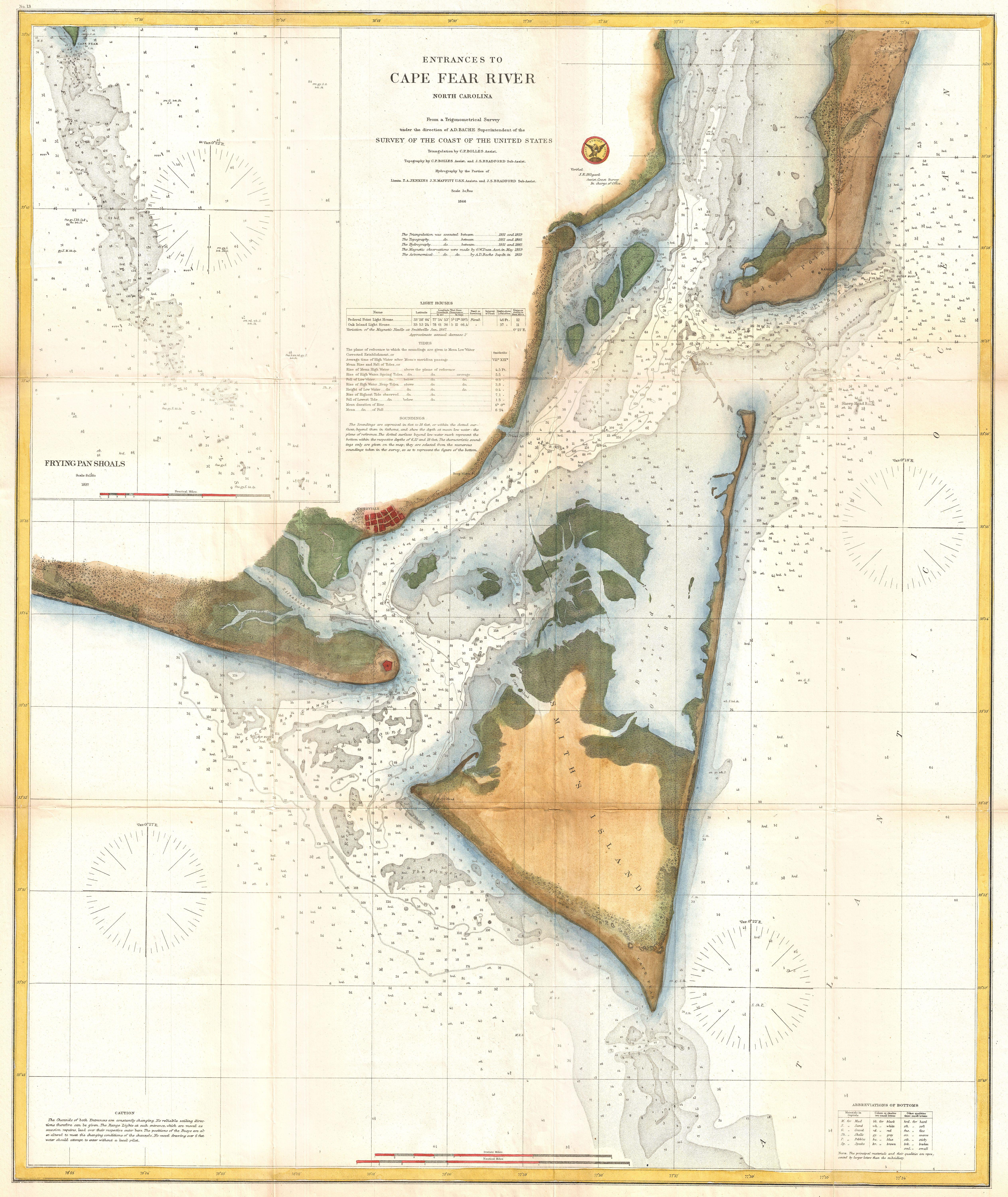
Chart showing the western channel of the Cape Fear River, site of Violet's blockade duty

On 1 February 1863, Violet arrived at Newport News, Virginia, for duty as a tugboat with the North Atlantic Blockading Squadron. During her time in Virginia there is one account of her carrying dispatches bound for General John J. Peck.

On 27 March 1863, she received orders to join the force blockading the Cape Fear River, commanded by Captain Charles S. Boggs. Violet was forced to return to Hampton Roads, Virginia, leaking badly, on 28 March 1863 after encountering a storm off Cape Hatteras, North Carolina. After making repairs, she sailed from Hampton Roads on 8 April 1863.

While Violet was consistently listed as a tug during her naval service, she was often used as an inshore blockade ship because of her shallow draft and relatively high speed. On the night of 11 April 1863, she was anchored in shallow water near the Cape Fear River when she was approached by an unidentified steamer. The ship turned to flee and Violet chased her, firing steadily, for forty-five minutes. Violet could not keep pace with the steamer and returned to her anchorage. Acting Ensign J. W. Bennett, Violet's captain, received a stern letter from Rear Admiral Samuel P. Lee regarding various tactical mistakes which allowed the blockade runner to escape.

In the company of USS Aries, Violet discovered the blockade-running British steamer Ceres aground and burning at the mouth of the Cape Fear River on 6 December 1863. When Ceres floated free during the night, Violet seized her and extinguished the fire.

Violet went aground on the western bar of the Cape Fear River on 20 December 1863 while attempting to refloat the blockade-running steamer Antonica. Violet lay aground for two nights and a day and there was concern that she would become a total loss. After her guns were heaved overboard, lightening the ship, she was successfully refloated.

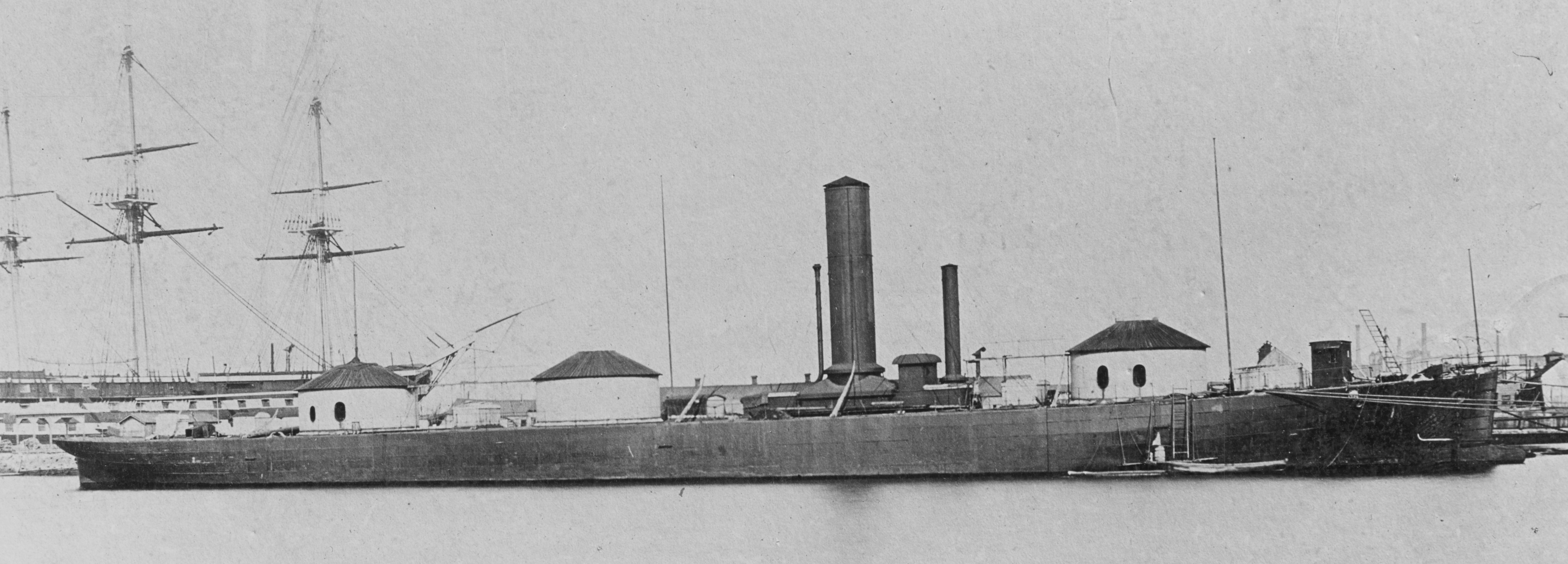
Ironclad USS Roanoke, Violet's consort in 1864

Early in 1864, Violet underwent repairs at the Norfolk Navy Yard, and in April was assigned duty as a guard for the ironclad USS Roanoke at Newport News, Virginia. Her orders were to maintain a vigilant nighttime and foul weather guard over the ironclad and be prepared to tow the warship to safety or run down any enemy vessels in the event of a Confederate attack.

On 20 July 1864, she was reassigned to her old blockade force off the Cape Fear River, now under the command of Captain Oliver S. Glisson. There, on the night of 7 August 1864, she ran aground while cruising near the western bar. Despite the efforts of her crew and other nearby Navy vessels to float her off, the tides forced Violet harder aground. She was within the range of Confederate guns at Fort Caswell, and thus might be subject to capture as the new day dawned. Violet's captain was ordered to fire her magazine to prevent capture, and the vessel blew up on the morning of 8 August 1864. Acting Ensign Thomas Stothard, was subject to the required court of inquiry on the loss of his command, but Admiral Lee recommended that no action be taken against him, calling him a "very intelligent and efficient officer".
