= USS Governor Buckingham =

Gunboat of the United States Navy

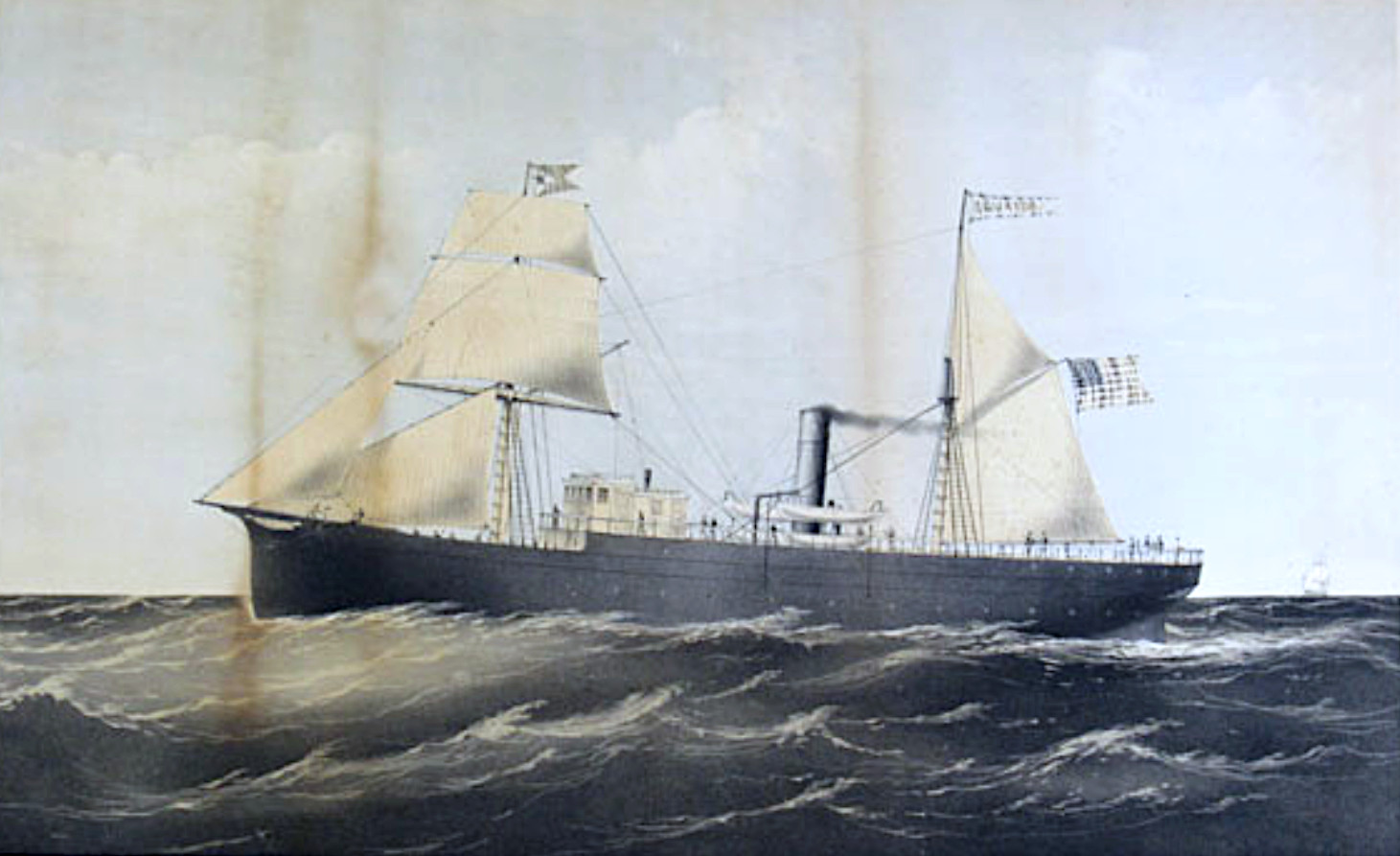
- Equator, formerly USS Governor Buckingham, ca. 1865

History

United States
- Namesake: William A. Buckingham
- Builder: Messrs Maxon Fish & Co.
- Launched: 1863
- Commissioned: 13 November 1863
- Decommissioned: 27 March 1865
- Fate: Sold 1865

General characteristics
- Displacement: 886 tons
- Length: 177 ft 6 in (54.10 m)
- Beam: 32 ft 2 in (9.80 m)
- Draft: 12 ft (3.7 m)
- Depth of hold: 17 ft (5.2 m)
- Speed: 8 knots
- Armament: 1,100-pdr., 120-pdr., 4 × 30-pdrs

USS Governor Buckingham was a screw steamship that served as a gunboat in the United States Navy during the American Civil War. The ship was built under contract by Messrs Maxon Fish & Co., Mystic, Conn., and was offered for sale to the Navy while on the ways; purchased at Stonington, Connecticut, 29 July 1863 by Isaac Henderson for $110,000; delivered at New York Navy Yard 30 September 1863; and commissioned 13 November 1863, Acting Volunteer Lt. W. G. Saltonstall in command. She was assigned to the North Atlantic Blockading Squadron, with instructions to report at Hampton Roads to Acting Rear Admiral S. P. Lee. The ship was named for the Governor of Connecticut, William A. Buckingham.

== Service ==
On 20 November 1863 she stood out to sea, arriving off Fortress Monroe on the 23d, thence to Norfolk Navy Yard. She departed Hampton Roads 5 December to join the Fleet off Wilmington, North Carolina, for active blockading duty.

The crew of the Governor Buckingham rapidly gained experience with the problem of tracking blockade runners. On 20 December with the assistance of Aries she captured the notorious blockade runner Antonica of Nassau, which ran ashore. Antonica's captain and crew attempted to get away in two small boats; but when fired upon they gave themselves up, and the 26 men were taken aboard as prisoners. After boarding and taking possession of the prize in early morning of 21 December, Aries and the tug Violet sent out boats to assist, without success, as the tide had left her fast.

On 3 January 1864, Governor Buckingham was with the flagship Fahkee when the blockade runner Bendigo ran aground during the chase; after efforts at salvage failed on 11 January Bendigo was destroyed.

That same day the British blockade runner Ranger was discovered after landing her passengers from Bermuda at Merrill's Inlet, 5 miles NE. She was intercepted by Minnesota, Governor Buckingham, Daylight, and Aries when she approached the Western Bar, and was beached and fired by her crew. Attempts by the squadron to extinguish the fire and haul her off were frustrated by Confederate sharpshooters, whose fire completely commanded her decks.

Later Governor Buckingham proceeded to Norfolk Navy Yard, for overhaul. She sailed from Hampton Roads on 3 July 1864 to return to blockade duty off Wilmington, and soon after was attached to the 1st Division off New Inlet. From 11 to 25 September she was at Beaufort, S.O., then back on her old station, she chased a blockade runner ashore on 25 September, firing five shots, three of which took effect as the target drove high and dry on the beach. One of the crew was killed, three wounded, and the steamer sent the surgeon and steward to their relief. Next day the blockade runner was set afire, but 20 bales of cotton, part of her cargo, were salvaged.

On 30 September 1864 Governor Buckingham took part off Fort Fisher in the destruction of the British-based blockade runner Black Hawk. Having been damaged in several accidental collisions, she entered Norfolk Navy Yard for drydocking on 27 October, and returned off New Inlet on 3 December. Later that month she took part in the first engagement of the Fleet against Fort Fisher, renewing the engagement for 2 days; then her boats were sent in to reembark troops.

The second attack upon Fort Fisher (13 to 16 January 1865) resulted in its capture. On 13 January Governor Buckingham was stationed off Half Moon Battery, assisting troops from the transports to land; she also landed provisions, ammunition and entrenching tools. After the battle on 16–17 January she was employed in carrying the wounded to the transports. On several occasions, in obedience to orders, she shelled the woods near Half Moon Battery. She remained in the area of Fort Fisher through January, dispersing bands of Confederate troops, and on the 19th shelled them out of entrenchments near the beach, allowing Union forces to advance and capture a number of prisoners.

On 4 February Governor Buckingham stood out to sea, arriving Norfolk Navy Yard on the 8th. As her boilers and machinery were out of repair, she was decommissioned 27 March and on 12 July 1865 was sold at public auction at the Brooklyn Navy Yard. Redocumented as a merchant ship under the name Equator, the vessel was homeported in New York. She was converted to a barge in 1893.
