= Koff (ship type) =

Ship type

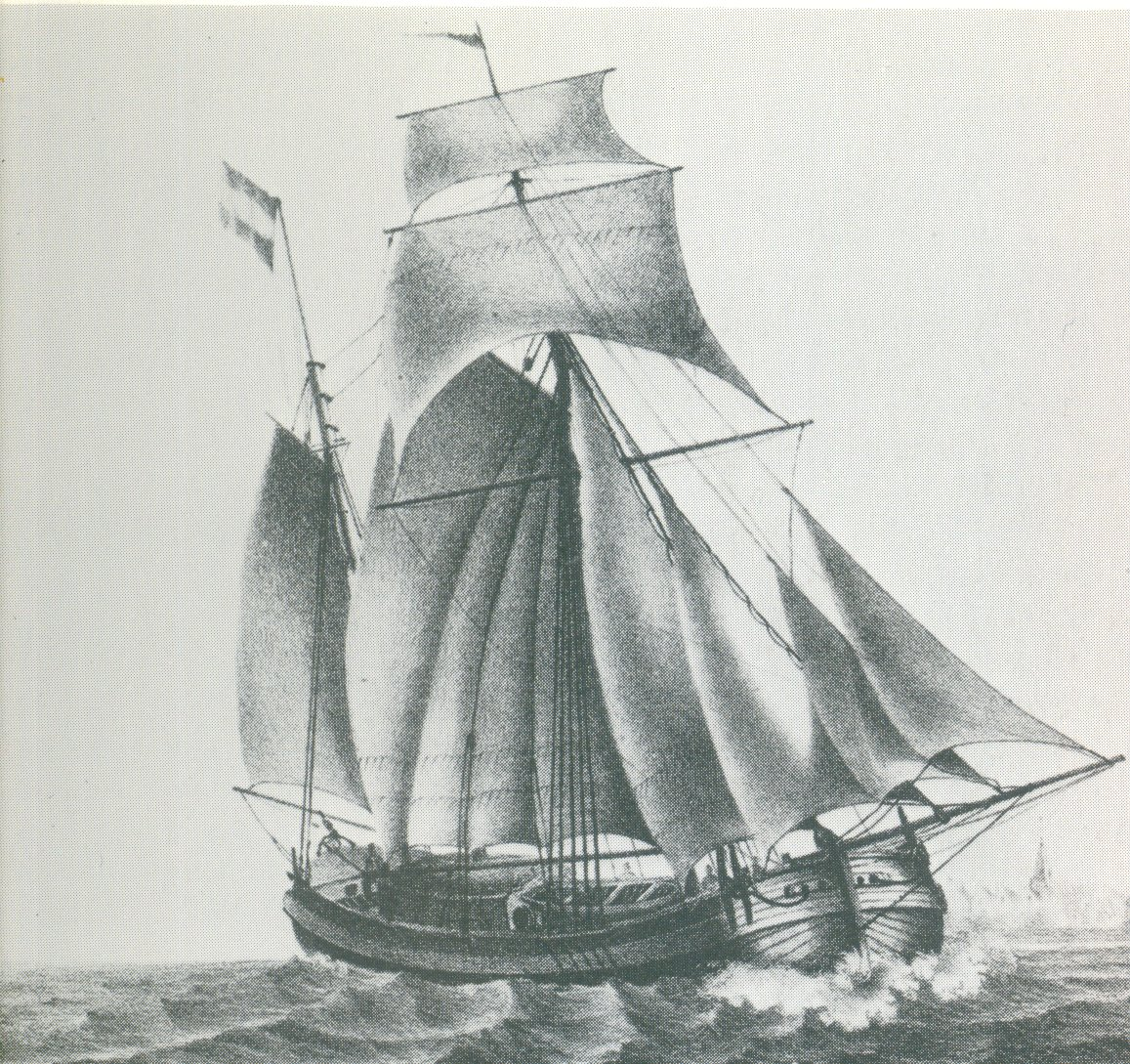
A koff depicted by P. Le Comte (1831)

A koff is a historical type of sailing vessel that was used for coastal shipping off Belgium, the Netherlands, and Germany in the 18th and 19th centuries. A typical koff had one and a half masts with a gaff rigged main sail and spanker and one or two square sails in the main top. The hull was plump with a flat bottom and a heavily rounded, raised bow and stern. Smaller koffs could be equipped with leeboards. Due to the shallow draught, koffs were especially suited for inshore shipping in shallow waters.

The koff had been developed in the late 17th century in the Netherlands. Smaller than the fluyt, its rounded bow and stern provided however for more storage on board. This made it a popular type that saw increasing service.

Koffs were often counted among the galiots by contemporary sources because the differences are very subtle: the galiot was considered more slender and therefore more elegant. On the koff, a deckhouse could be installed between the two masts which would provide shelter for up to twelve crew men. The typical dimensions have been reported as "80 feet long, 21 feet wide and 11 feet deep". Later versions could have a schooner or galeas rig.
