= USS Iron Age =

Gunboat of the United States Navy

Coordinates: 33°54′42″N 78°14′17″W

History

United States
- Name: Iron Age
- Launched: 1862
- Acquired: 28 April 1863
- Commissioned: 25 June 1863
- Out of service: 11 January 1864
- Fate: Ran aground and burned 11 January 1864

General characteristics
- Displacement: 424 tons
- Length: 144 ft (44 m)
- Beam: 25 ft (7.6 m)
- Draft: 12 ft 6 in (3.81 m)
- Propulsion: steam engine; screw-propelled
- Armament: 3 × 30-pounder Dahlgren rifles; 6 × 8 in (203 mm) Dahlgren guns

USS Iron Age was a steamer acquired by the Union Navy during the American Civil War. She was used by the Navy to patrol navigable waterways of the Confederacy to prevent the Confederates from trading with other countries.

== Service history ==
Iron Age was built at Kennebunk, Maine, in 1862; then purchased by the Navy at Boston, Massachusetts, 28 April 1863 and commissioned 25 June 1863, Lt. Comdr. E. E. Stone in command. That day she sailed from Boston in search of Confederate commerce raider, CSS Tacony, which was taking a heavy toll of New England shipping. After learning that the enemy cruiser had been burned and her crew captured, Iron Age returned to Boston on 7 July 1863. She spent the rest of the summer in New England waters protecting Union commerce, fisheries, and coasts. Iron Age was transferred to the North Atlantic Blockading Squadron 3 September 1863, and sailed for Wilmington, North Carolina, two days later, arriving off New Inlet 11 September 1863. On her fifth day of blockade duty, she discovered a runner attempting to escape, drove her back, and forced her to run ashore just abreast of Fort Fisher. On 21 October 1863, she assisted USS Nansemond and USS Niphon in destroying blockade runner Venus.

Christmas Eve that year was the occasion for a raid on salt works at Bear Inlet. A large stockpile of salt desperately needed by the South was destroyed. This blow was doubly effective since the raiders also prevented the manufacture of a new supply by smashing the irreplaceable equipment in the plants. In late 1863, the Confederate blockade runner Elizabeth ran aground just off of Holden Beach in the Lockwood's Folly Inlet. In January 1864, the Confederate blockade runner Bendigo, returning from the port of Nassau with critical supplies for the Confederacy, saw the wreck of Elizabeth and thought it to be a Union warship. Following the tactics of the day, Bendigo attempted to pass at full speed between enemy and the shore.

This resulted in Bendigo running hard aground. The captain of Bendigo recruited the help of the locals on Holden Beach and was able to salvage the supplies of the vessel. Following this, the captain set fire to Bendigo and abandoned ship. Within a few days, Iron Age and USS Daylight were ordered to the Inlet to attempt to float Bendigo, but Iron Age ran hard aground at 09:00 on 9 January during the attempt. After untiring efforts to lighten her failed, she was put to the torch at 04:00 on 11 January, and was destroyed an hour and a half later when her magazine exploded.

Several days later locals from Holden Beach and the surrounding area would row out to the wreck in an attempt to salvage anything of value. Neil Holden, a Confederate soldier and descendant of the Holden Beach's namesake, claims to have found a razor blade in the captain's cabin of USS Iron Age and has passed it down for several generations. The razor has stayed in the Holden family since the Civil War.
