= List of shipwrecks in October 1862 =

The list of shipwrecks in October 1862 includes ships sunk, foundered, grounded, or otherwise lost during October 1862.

== 1 October ==
List of shipwrecks: 1 October 1862
Ship	State	Description
Barbara and Margaret	United Kingdom	The ship was wrecked on "Hastend Island". Her crew were rescued.
Elizabeth	United Kingdom	The schooner was driven ashore at Redcar, Yorkshire. She was on a voyage from Wisbech, Cambridgeshire to Newcastle upon Tyne, Northumberland. She was refloated the next day and taken in to Hartlepool, County Durham for repairs.
Ida	United Kingdom	The steamship was driven ashore in the Bosphorus opposite Therapia, Ottoman Empire. She was on a voyage from Odesa to Smyrna, Ottoman Empire and London.
Marice	Hamburg	The schooner was lost off "Wardoe". Her crew were rescued.
South Sea	United Kingdom	The ship was wrecked at the Sand Heads, India. Her crew were rescued. She was on a voyage from Calcutta, India to London.

== 2 October ==
List of shipwrecks: 2 October 1862
Ship	State	Description
Celontas	Netherlands	The ship was driven ashore and wrecked. She was on a voyage from Makassar, to Surabaya, Netherlands East Indies.
Iona	United Kingdom	American Civil War, Union blockade: The 325-Gross register ton sidewheel paddle steamer, a blockade runner, collided with the steamship Chanticleer (United Kingdom) and sank in the Firth of Clyde. Her crew survived. She was on a voyage from Glasgow, Renfrewshire to Nassau, Bahamas.
Sandelma	Denmark	The ship was wrecked on the Paternoster Rocks, in the Baltic Sea. She was on a voyage from Cardiff, Glamorgan, Wales to Copenhagen.
William Ingles	United Kingdom	The ship ran aground on the Shipwash Sand, in the North Sea off the coast of Suffolk and was abandoned by her crew. She was on a voyage from Sines, Portugal to London. She had become a wreck by the next day.
Young Elizabeth	United Kingdom	The ship was wrecked at Aberystwyth, Cardiganshire.

== 3 October ==
List of shipwrecks: 3 October 1862
Ship	State	Description
Annie Gibson	United Kingdom	The schooner was driven ashore at Bamburgh, Northumberland. Her crew were rescued. She was on a voyage from the Clyde to Dunkirk, Nord, France. She was refloated and taken in to Berwick upon Tweed, Northumberland.
Antigua	United Kingdom	The ship ran aground in Lake Saint Pierre. She was on a voyage from Montreal, Province of Canada, British North America to the Clyde. She was refloated and resumed her voyage.
Brilliant	United States	American Civil War, CSS Alabama's New England Expeditionary Raid: The 839-ton ship, carrying a cargo of flour and grain from New York to London, England was captured and burned on the Grand Banks of Newfoundland near 40°00′N 50°30′W by the screw sloop-of-war CSS Alabama (Confederate States Navy).
David Begg	United Kingdom	The ship was abandoned in the Indian Ocean. Her crew were rescued by the barque Countess of Yarborough (United Kingdom). David Begg was on a voyage from Calcutta, India to Liverpool. Her crew alleged that her captain deliberately scuttled the vessel.
James	United Kingdom	The brig ran aground on the Gunfleet Sand, in the North Sea off the coast of Essex. She was refloated and resumed her voyage to London.
Jane and Elizabeth	United Kingdom	The schooner ran aground on the Vlie Banks, off the coast of Friesland, Netherlands. She was on a voyage from Liverpool, Lancashire to Hamburg. She was a total loss.
Mary	United Kingdom	The ship collided with Ada (United Kingdom) and sank in the North Sea off the coast of Norfolk. Her crew were rescued by Ada. Mary was on a voyage from Sunderland, County Durham to Le Tréport, Seine-Inférieure, France.
Mary and Alice	United Kingdom	The ship was driven ashore and wrecked at Portpatrick, Wigtownshire.
Nepaul	United Kingdom	The ship was abandoned at sea. Her crew were rescued by Brothers (United Kingdom). Nepaul was on a voyage from Kurrachee, India to Falmouth, Cornwall.
Spy	United Kingdom	The ship was driven ashore. She was on a voyage from Demerara, British Guiana to London. She was refloated and assisted in to Dover, Kent.
Unnamed	France	The brig ran aground on the Kentish Knock. She was refloated.

== 4 October ==
List of shipwrecks: 4 October 1862
Ship	State	Description
Ann Augusta	United Kingdom	The ship ran aground in the Belfast Lough. She was on a voyage from New York, United States to Belfast, County Antrim.
Aspasia	United Kingdom	The ship struck a sunken rock and was run ashore at "Takli", Russia, where she was wrecked. Her crew were rescued. She was on a voyage from Taganrog, Russia to a British port.
Johan Morhr	Prussia	The ship was driven ashore on "Leskr", Russia. She was on a voyage from Kronstadt to Liebau. She was refloated and put back to Kronstadt.
Mary	United Kingdom	The brig collided with the barque Ada (United Kingdom) and sank in the North Sea off the coast of Norfolk. Her crew were rescued by Ada. Mary was on a voyage from Sunderland, County Durham to Le Tréport, Seine-Inférieure, France.
Mary Gillespie	United Kingdom	The brig ran aground on the Cross Sand, in the North Sea off the coast of Norfolk. She was on a voyage from Blyth, Northumberland to Boulogne, Pas-de-Calais, France. She was refloated and taken in to Great Yarmouth, Norfolk.
Oscar	Sweden	The ship was driven ashore and wrecked on Öland. She was on a voyage from Ystad to London, United Kingdom.
Pacha	United Kingdom	The ship ran aground on Morups Reef, in the Baltic Sea. She was on a voyage from Newcastle upon Tyne, Northumberland to Kronstadt, Russia.

== 5 October ==
List of shipwrecks: 5 October 1862
Ship	State	Description
Carl Stemorth	Prussia	The brig was driven ashore 3 nautical miles (5.6 km) west of Roquetas, Spain. Her crew were rescued. She was on a voyage from Odesa to Grimsby, Lincolnshire, United Kingdom.
Dykes	United Kingdom	The brig was wrecked on Anticosti Island, Nova Scotia, British North America. Her crew survived. She was on a voyage from Maryport, Cumberland to Quebec City, Province of Canada, British North America.
Magari Gezina	Netherlands	The ship was wrecked on the Spikeway, in the North Sea. She was on a voyage from Groningen to London, England.
Tubal Cain	United Kingdom	The schooner ran aground on the Scroby Sands, Norfolk. She was on a voyage from Blyth, Northumberland to Deal, Kent. She was refloated and resumed her voyage.

== 6 October ==
List of shipwrecks: 6 October 1862
Ship	State	Description
Arthur Childs	United Kingdom	The ship departed from New York, United States for the Clyde. No further trace, presumed foundered with the loss of all hands.
Jane and Isabella	United Kingdom	The schooner ran aground south west of Stroma, Orkney Islands. She was on a voyage from Fraserburgh, Aberdeenshire to Belfast, County Antrim. She was refloated.
Mauritius	United Kingdom	The ship was abandoned in the Atlantic Ocean. All on board were rescued. She was discovered on 7 October by the barque Orixa (France) and Shakespeare (United Kingdom). Five crew from Orixa and four from Shakespear were put aboard Mauritius with the intention of taking her in to Saint Helena, but she subsequently foundered. Only one crew member originally from Orixa was rescued. Mauritius was on a voyage from Greenock, Renfrewshire to Kurrachee, India.
Spring	United Kingdom	The ship ran aground on the Sheringham Shoal, in the North Sea of the coast of Norfolk. She was on a voyage from South Shields, County Durham to London. She was refloated and resumed her voyage, but consequently sank 6 nautical miles (11 km) off the coast. her crew were rescued.
Walker Lass	United Kingdom	The sloop was driven ashore and wrecked at Redcar, Yorkshire. She was on a voyage from Skinningrove, Yorkshire to South Shields.
Unnamed	United Kingdom	The smack foundered in the North Sea 20 nautical miles (37 km) off the coast of Aberdeenshire. Her three crew took to a boat; they were rescued by the tug Britannia (United Kingdom).

== 7 October ==
List of shipwrecks: 7 October 1862
Ship	State	Description
David and John	United Kingdom	The schooner was driven ashore at Gosforth, Northumberland. She was on a voyage from Montrose, Forfarshire to Seaham, County Durham. She was refloated the next day and towed in to Berwick upon Tweed, Northumberland.
Dunkirk	United States	American Civil War, CSS Alabama's New England Expeditionary Raid: During a voyage from New York to Lisbon, Portugal, with a cargo of flour and Portuguese language bibles, the 293-ton brig was captured and burned in the North Atlantic Ocean southeast of Nova Scotia, British North America by the screw sloop-of-war CSS Alabama (Confederate States Navy).
Elizabeth	United Kingdom	The collier, a brig, was run down and sunk in the North Sea off the Sunk Lightship ( Trinity House) by a steamship with the loss of five of her crew.
Forrester, and Tynemouth	United Kingdom	The steamship Forrester was run into by the paddle steamer Tynemouth and sank in the River Tyne with the loss of six lives. She was on a voyage from Newcastle upon Tyne, Northumberland to South Shields, County Durham. Tynemouth was on a voyage from South Shields to Newcastle upon Tyne. She was severely damaged and was beached.
Kate McLea	United Kingdom	The brig was sighted off "Bic Island", Province of Canada, British North America whilst on a voyage from Montreal, Province of Canada to Exeter, Devon. No further trace, presumed foundered with the loss of all hands.
Libra	United Kingdom	The ship foundered in the Mediterranean Sea 200 nautical miles (370 km) from Alexandria, Egypt. Her crew survived. She was on a voyage from Alexandria to Falmouth, Cornwall.
Mary	United Kingdom	The ship foundered off the north coast of Norfolk.
Maryland	United States	The schooner was lost at Cape Mendocino, California, Confederate States of America.
Primera de Torrevieja	Spain	The ship was driven ashore at Holyhead, Anglesey, United Kingdom. She was on a voyage from Liverpool, Lancashire, England to the River Plate. She was refloated with assistance from the tug Storm King (United Kingdom).
Wave Crest	United States	American Civil War, CSS Alabama's New England Expeditionary Raid: During a voyage to Cardiff, Glamorgan, Wales with a cargo of grain, the 409-ton barque was captured, used for target practice, and burned in the North Atlantic Ocean southeast of Nova Scotia by the screw sloop-of-war CSS Alabama (Confederate States Navy).

== 8 October ==
List of shipwrecks: 8 October 1862
Ship	State	Description
Blanche	United Kingdom	American Civil War, Union blockade: Pursued by the screw steamer USS Montgomery (United States Navy), the sidewheel paddle steamer, a blockade runner, ran aground at Marianao, Cuba, and a boat crew from Montgomery boarded and seized her. Soon afterward, while the boat crew attempted to refloat her, a fire broke out which destroyed her and her cargo.
Denmark	United States	The 283-ton sidewheel paddle steamer struck a snag and sank in the Missouri River at Atlas Island below Keokuk, Iowa.
Francis Elmor (or Francis Elmore)	United States	American Civil War: Carrying a cargo of hay, the schooner was captured and burned by Confederate forces in the Potomac River at Popes Creek, Virginia, Confederate States of America.
Galatea	United Kingdom	The ship departed from Dartmouth, Devon for Dundalk, County Louth. No further trace, presumed foundered with the loss of all hands.
Pace	Austrian Empire	The barque ran aground in the River Suir. She was on a voyage from Sulina, Ottoman Empire to Waterford, United Kingdom. She was refloated but found to be leaky.

== 9 October ==
List of shipwrecks: 9 October 1862
Ship	State	Description
Ceres	United States	The 217-ton sidewheel paddle steamer exploded at St. Joseph Island, Louisiana.
Countess, or Countess of London	United Kingdom	The ship was wrecked on Anticosti Island, Nova Scotia, British North America. She was on a voyage from Quebec City, Province of Canada, British North America to Plymouth, Devon. Her crew survived. Some of them took to a boat; they were rescued by the steamship Caledonia (United Kingdom). The rest reached Anticosti Island.
Eliza	Confederate States of America	American Civil War, Union blockade: Carrying a cargo of sugar, the sloop was captured and destroyed at Calcasieu, Louisiana, on or about 9 October.
Familien Store	Sweden	The ship was driven ashore on the coast of Essex or Suffolk, United Kingdom. She was on a voyage from Gothenburg to Algiers, Algeria. She was refloated the next day and taken in to Harwich, Essex.
Lady Clarendon	United Kingdom	The ship ran aground on the Ranka Folah, in the Hooghly River. She was on a voyage from Calcutta, India to Colombo, Ceylon. She was refloated and resumed her voyage.
Parana	United Kingdom	The barque was wrecked in Simon's Bay.

== 10 October ==
List of shipwrecks: 10 October 1862
Ship	State	Description
Elizabeth	United Kingdom	The ship was wrecked on the Kentish Knock. Her crew were rescued by Marco Polo (United Kingdom).
City of Sydney	New South Wales	The ship was wrecked on Green Cape, New South Wales. All passengers and crew boarded lifeboats and made it ashore.

== 11 October ==
List of shipwrecks: 11 October 1862
Ship	State	Description
Argyll	(United Kingdom of Great Britain and Ireland) British Guiana	The brig departed from New York for Barbados. No further trace, presumed foundered with the loss of all hands.
Gem	United Kingdom	The smack struck a rock off Burravoe Shetland Islands and was beached. She was later refloated.
Gezina	Flag unknown	The ship was sighted off Skagen, Denmark whilst on a voyage from Riga, Russia to Hull, Yorkshire, United Kingdom. No further trace, presumed foundered with the loss of all hands.
Manchester	United States	American Civil War, CSS Alabama's New England Expeditionary Raid: The 1,062-ton full-rigged ship, carrying a cargo of grain from New York to Liverpool, Lancashire, England, was captured and burned in the North Atlantic Ocean southeast of Nova Scotia, British North America (44°08′55″N 55°26′00″W) by the screw sloop-of-war CSS Alabama (Confederate States Navy).

== 12 October ==
List of shipwrecks: 12 October 1862
Ship	State	Description
Foreman	United Kingdom	The ship was driven ashore at Newburgh, Fife. Her crew were rescued.
Hamburg	United Kingdom	The paddle steamer was driven ashore at Scotstoun Head, Aberdeenshire. All on board survived. She was on a voyage from Kirkwall, Orkney Islands to Aberdeen. She broke in two on 15 October.
Hannah	Confederate States Army	American Civil War, Union blockade: The armed schooner ran aground 7 miles (11 km) north of Corpus Christi, Texas. Her crew burned her soon thereafter when a boat party from a United States Navy warship that anchored 400 yards (370 meters) away made preparations to approach and board Hannah.
Myrtle	United Kingdom	The ship caught fire in the English Channel and was beached at Smallmouth, Dorset. She was on a voyage from Antwerp, Belgium to Weymouth, Dorset. She was refloated the next day and towed in to Weymouth.

== 13 October ==
List of shipwrecks: 13 October 1862
Ship	State	Description
Ann	United Kingdom	The smack was driven ashore in Carnarvon Bay. Her crew were rescued. She was on a voyage from Pwllheli, Caernarfonshire to Liverpool, Lancashire.
Elzear	United Kingdom	The ship ran aground on the Ooster Bank, off the coast of Zeeland, Netherlands. Her crew were rescued.
Paul	United Kingdom	The ship was sighted in the North Sea whilst on a voyage from Königsberg, Prussia to Dundee, Forfarshire. No further trace, presumed foundered with the loss of all hands.
Retriever	United Kingdom	The ship was driven ashore and wrecked at Lydstep Haven, Pembrokeshire. Her crew were rescued.
Waldensian	United Kingdom	The steamship was wrecked near Cape Agulhas, Cape Colony. All on board survived. She was on a voyage from Durban to Cape Town.

== 14 October ==
List of shipwrecks: 14 October 1862
Ship	State	Description
Alderman Thompson	United Kingdom	The ship ran aground at Cardigan.
Dalemain	United Kingdom	The ship was wrecked on the Arklow Bank, in the Irish Sea off the coast of County Wicklow. She was on a voyage from Liverpool, Lancashire to Guatemala.
HMS Hero	Royal Navy	The Agamemnon-class ship of the line ran aground off Sambro Island, Nova Scotia, British North America. Subsequently refloated, repaired and returned to service.

== 15 October ==
List of shipwrecks: 15 October 1862
Ship	State	Description
Emily C. Starr	United States	The full-rigged ship departed from "Nazasck" for Shanghai, China. No further trace, presumed foundered with the loss of all hands.
G. L. Brockenborough	Confederate States of America	American Civil War, Union blockade: The sloop, an apparent blockade runner, was found scuttled in the Appalachicola River in Florida by the sidewheel paddle steamer USS Fort Henry (United States Navy). She was refloated and repaired by Union forces and placed in United States Navy service as USS G. L. Brockenborough.
John Fenwick	United Kingdom	The steamship ran aground off Livorno, Italy. She was on a voyage from Genoa, Italy to London. She was refloated.
Lamplighter	United States	American Civil War: The 365-ton barque or brig (sources differ), bound from New York to Gibraltar with a cargo of tobacco, was captured and burned in the North Atlantic Ocean southeast of Nova Scotia. British North America (41°32′47″N 59°17′45″W) by the screw sloop-of-war CSS Alabama (Confederate States Navy).
Lilias	United Kingdom	The ship was driven ashore at Red Island, Newfoundland, British North America. She was on a voyage from Port Madoc, Caernarfonshire to Quebec City, Province of Canada, British North America.
Lone Star	Confederate States of America	American Civil War, Union blockade: The schooner was burned at Taylor's Bayou, Texas, by boat crews from the gunboat USS Rachel Seaman and the armed steamer USS Kensington (both United States Navy).
Margaret and Ann	United Kingdom	The ship was abandoned off Strumble Head, Pembrokeshire. Her crew survived. She was on a voyage from Maryport, Cumberland to Saint-Valery-sur-Somme, Somme, France.
Orion	United Kingdom	The ship ran aground at Neath, Glamorgan.
Pauline Cornelia	Netherlands	The schooner was driven ashore on Granskär, Grand Duchy of Finland. She was on a voyage from Saint Petersburg, Russia to an English port. She was refloated on 18 October and taken in to Helsinki, Grand Duchy of Finland.
Ramonita	Danzig	The brig ran aground on Smith's Knoll, in the North Sea off the coast of Norfolk, England. She was on a voyage from Alloa, Clackmannanshire, Scotland to New York, United States. She was refloated and taken in to Great Yarmouth, Norfolk in a leaky condition.
Stonewall	Confederate States of America	American Civil War, Union blockade: The schooner was burned at Taylor's Bayou by boat crews from the gunboat USS Rachel Seaman and the armed steamer USS Kensington (both United States Navy).
Yarmouth	United Kingdom	The ship was wrecked near "Warberg", Sweden. Her crew were rescued. She was on a voyage from Sunderland, County Durham to Stettin.

== 16 October ==
List of shipwrecks: 16 October 1862
Ship	State	Description
Europa	United Kingdom	The ship ran aground on the Gunfleet Sand, in the North Sea off the coast of Essex. She was on a voyage from Arkhangelsk, Russia to London. She was refloated on 20 October and towed in to Harwich, Essex.
Favourite	United Kingdom	The smack was wrecked on "North Faro Island". Her crew were rescued.
Ida Albertina	United Kingdom	The schooner ran aground on the Middelgrund, off the Danish coast. She was on a voyage from Sunderland, County Durham to the "Nieu Diep". She was refloated the next day and resumed her voyage.
Lecolme	United Kingdom	The yacht was driven ashore in Lough Deary. Her crew were rescued.
Louise	United Kingdom	The ship collided with HMS Eclipse (Royal Navy) in the English Channel off Beachy Head, Sussex and was abandoned. Her crew were rescued by HMS Eclipse. Louise was on a voyage from Swansea, Glamorgan to Hastings, Sussex. She was taken in to Ramsgate, Kent in a derelict condition the next day.
Oak	United Kingdom	The brig was wrecked near Solva, Pembrokeshire. Her five crew were rescued by rocket apparatus. She was on a voyage from Troon, Ayrshire to Cardiff, Glamorgan.
Portland	United Kingdom	The schooner ran aground on the Whitby Rock. She was refloated and resumed her voyage.
Retriever	United Kingdom	The ship was driven ashore and wrecked near "Lydsteth".
Triton	United Kingdom	The ship ran aground on the Hoff, in the Baltic Sea off the coast of Prussia. She was on a voyage from Memel, Prussia to London. She was refloated the next day.
Unnamed	(United Kingdom of Great Britain and Ireland) Isle of Man	The smack was wrecked in Dundrum Bay with the loss of all eight crew.

== 17 October ==
List of shipwrecks: 17 October 1862
Ship	State	Description
Ann	United Kingdom	The ship was run into by Falonica (United Kingdom) and sank. She was on a voyage from South Shields, County Durham to Torquay, Devon.
Captain Cook	United Kingdom	The schooner ran aground off Lowestoft, Suffolk. She was on a voyage from South Shields to London. She was refloated.
Cygnet	United Kingdom	The sloop ran aground on the Woolsteners, in the English Channel and sank. Her three crew were rescued by the smack Ferret (United Kingdom).
Economy	United States	The 197- or 200-ton sternwheel paddle steamer was lost on the Ohio River.
Francis	United Kingdom	The brig was abandoned in the North Sea off the coast of Suffolk and sank. Her crew survived. She was on a voyage from Newcastle upon Tyne, Northumberland to Lisbon, Portugal.
Friendship	United Kingdom	The ship ram aground off Pakefield, Suffolk. She was on a voyage from Newcastle upon Tyne to London. She was refloated and assisted in to Lowestoft.
Hamburg	France	The steamship collided with the barque Juanita (France) and sank in the English Channel with the loss of 26 lives. There were at least two survivors. Hamburg was on a voyage from Havre de Grâce, Seine-Inférieure to Brest, Finistère.
Jeune Albert	France	The brigantine was driven ashore at Seaford, Sussex, United Kingdom. Her five crew were rescued by the Coastguard using rocket apparatus. The ship's pig swam ashore. Jeune Albert was on a voyage from Requejada, Spain to Antwerp, Belgium.
Jeune Oscar	France	The schooner was driven ashore and wrecked at Gunwalloe, Cornwall, England. Her crew were rescued. She was on a voyage from Bône, Algeria to Dunkirk, Nord, France.
Lady Beatrice	United Kingdom	The ship was damaged by fire at Antwerp, Belgium.
Louise	United Kingdom	The schooner was taken in to Ramsgate, Kent in a derelict condition, apparently having been in collision with another vessel.
Lurline	United Kingdom	The ship ran aground in Lough Dearg and was abandoned. Her crew were rescued.
Margaret and Ann	United Kingdom	The schooner was abandoned off Strumble Head, Pembrokeshire. She was on a voyage from Maryport, Cumberland to Saint-Valery-sur-Somme, Somme, France.
Richard Reynolds	United Kingdom	The barque was driven ashore at Lowestoft, Suffolk. She was on a voyage from Kronstadt, Russia to Poole, Dorset.
Royalist	United Kingdom	The schooner ran aground on the Gunfleet Sand, in the North Sea off the coast of Suffolk. She was on a voyage from Hartlepool to Gravesend, Kent. She was refloated with assistance from Queen and assisted in to Harwich, Essex.
Salonica	United Kingdom	The brig ran into Ann (United Kingdom and sank in the North Sea off Great Yarmouth with the presumed loss of all hands. She was on a voyage from Torquay, Devon to South Shields, County Durham.
Teign	United Kingdom	The ship was driven ashore and damaged at Newton Noyse Point. SHe was refloated and taken in to Milford Haven, Pembrokeshire.
Unity	United Kingdom	The brigantine ran aground on the Newcombe Sand. Her crew took to a boat; they were rescued by Oak (United Kingdom). Unity was on a voyage from Gravesend to South Shields.
Wesleyan	United Kingdom	The schooner was wrecked near the mouth of the River Cuckmere. All ten people on board were rescued by the fishing smacks Harlequin and Wave (both United Kingdom). Wesleyan was on a voyage from Portland, Dorset to London.
Unnamed	United Kingdom	The Yorkshire Billyboy foundered in the English Channel off the coast of Sussex. All ten people on board were rescued by the fishing smack Wave (United Kingdom).

== 18 October ==
List of shipwrecks: 18 October 1862
Ship	State	Description
Anne E Hooper	United States	Lytham Lifeboat going to the rescue of the crew of Anne E. Hooper The full-rigged ship was driven on to the Horse Bank, in the Irish Sea off the coast of Lancashire, United Kingdom with the loss of six of the 23 people on board. Three survivors were rescued by the Lytham Lifeboat and fourteen by the Southport Lifeboat Jessie Knowles (United Kingdom). Anne E. Hooper was on a voyage from Baltimore, Maryland to Liverpool, Lancashire. She broke up the next day.
Molocka	United States	The full-rigged ship ran aground in the River Mersey. She was on a voyage from New York to Liverpool. She was refloated and taken in to Liverpool.
Sarah Bragg	United Kingdom	The ship was driven ashore 2 nautical miles (3.7 km) north of Whitehaven, Cumberland. Her crew were rescued.
Sebastian Cabot	United Kingdom	The ship ran aground in the Hooghly River. She was on a voyage from Calcutta, India to Colombo, Ceylon. She was refloated on 21 October.
Trio	United Kingdom	The barque foundered in The Downs with the loss of all hands. She was on a voyage from Safi, Morocco to London.
Wisconsin	United States	The full-rigged ship broke from her moorings and was driven into Carrier Dove (United Kingdom) in the River Mersey and was damaged.
Unnamed	Bremen	The brig was wrecked on the Horse Bank.

== 19 October ==
List of shipwrecks: 19 October 1862
Ship	State	Description
Active	United Kingdom	The ship collided with another vessel in the North Sea off Lowestoft, Suffolk. Her crew were rescued. She was on a voyage from Goole, Yorkshire to London.
Addison Potter	United Kingdom	The steamship departed from the River Tyne for Hamburg. No further trace, presumed foundered in the North Sea with the loss of all 17 crew.
Adelaide	United Kingdom	American Civil War: The schooner was captured by a United States Navy cruiser near Wilmington, Delaware. She was run ashore and destroyed.
Adelphi	United Kingdom	The collier, a brig, departed from North Shields, Northumberland for London. No further trace, presumed foundered in the North Sea with the loss of all hands, nine or ten lives.
Ænas	United Kingdom	The schooner was wrecked on Flat Holm, Glamorgan with the loss of two lives.
Agnes	United Kingdom	The barque ran aground on the Gunfleet Sand, in the North Sea off the coast of Essex and was abandoned by her twelve crew, who were rescued by the smack Orwell (United Kingdom). Agnes was on a voyage from South Shields, County Durham to London.
Anne	Denmark	The ship was driven ashore and wrecked at Orfordness, Suffolk, United Kingdom. She was on a voyage from Aarhus to London, England.
Bazelius	United Kingdom	The collier, a brig departed North Shields for London. Presumed subsequently foundered in the North Sea with the loss of all hands; a name board from the ship washed up on the Dutch coast.
Bolton	United Kingdom	The brig ran around on Scroby Sands, Norfolk. She was on a voyage from South Shields, County Durham to London. She was refloated and assisted in to Lowestoft, Suffolk in a leaky condition.
Cupid	United Kingdom	The schooner collided with City of Pekin off Folkestone, Kent. She was towed in to Folkestone in a derelict condition.
Elizabeth	United Kingdom	The ship was wrecked in the Gaspar Strait. She was on a voyage from Jeddah, Jeddah Eyalet to Calcutta, India.
Ellen Horsfall	United Kingdom	The ship was wrecked off the Isle of Wight.
Fergus	United Kingdom	The ship capsized in the North Sea. Her crew were rescued on 22 October by the brig Nuova Elisa (United Kingdom). Fergus was on a voyage from Hamburg to Perth. She was later driven ashore and wrecked at Lemvig, Denmark.
Genius	United Kingdom	The barque foundered in the North Sea off the coast of Suffolk with the loss of all but one of her crew. She was on a voyage from Middlesbrough, Yorkshire to Exmouth, Devon. The wreck came ashore at Thorpeness.
Glenbrook	United Kingdom	The brig ran aground on the Corton Sand. She was on a voyage from Sunderland, County Durham to Jamaica. She was refloated.
Hope	United Kingdom	The schooner was driven ashore in Turnberry Bay, Ayrshire. Her six crew were rescued by a lifeboat.
Locadia	United States	The ship took on board a pilot off Liverpool. No further trace, presumed foundered with the loss of all hands. She was on a voyage from Baltimore, Maryland to Liverpool.
Lotus	United Kingdom	The barque was driven ashore and wrecked in Chale Bay, Isle of Wight with the loss of twelve of her fourteen crew. She was on a voyage from Demerara, British Guiana to London.
The Glory of Hartlepool	United Kingdom	The ship foundered in the North Sea en route to Hamburg. The Master, John Loynes, wrote a message in a bottle that washed up at Nordby Strand, Denmark giving the news.
Margaret Knight	United Kingdom	The snow was lost wrecked on Inishmurray, County Sligo with the loss of all but one or two of her eight crew. She was on a voyage from Blyth, Northumberland to Rio de Janeiro, Brazil.
Rhein	United Kingdom	The collier was driven ashore on Düne, Heligoland. Her crew were rescued. She was on a voyage from Hamburg to Middlesbrough, Yorkshire.
Thrifty	United Kingdom	The schooner was wrecked on the Longsand in the North Sea off the coast of Essex with the loss of two of the six people on board. Survivors were rescued the next day by the smack Paragon (United Kingdom). Thrifty was on a voyage from Grangemouth, Stirlingshire to Rouen, Seine-Inférieure, France.
Western Trader	United Kingdom	The schooner was driven ashore at Peel, Isle of Man. Her crew were rescued. She had become a wreck by 21 October.
Wild Duck	United Kingdom	The crewless smack was driven onto the Sunk Sand, in the Humber. She was refloated the next day and towed in to Grimsby, Lincolnshire.
Unnamed	United Kingdom	The schooner was driven ashore and wrecked at Ballyandreen, County Cork. Her crew were rescued.
Unnamed	France	The brig was driven ashore 10 nautical miles (19 km) east of Calais. Her crew were rescued.

== 20 October ==
List of shipwrecks: 20 October 1862
Ship	State	Description
Ada	United Kingdom	The barque was damaged in the River Tyne.
Alon	United Kingdom	The ship was damaged in the River Tyne.
Amsterdam	Netherlands	The full-rigged ship was driven from her moorings and damaged at South Shields, County Durham, United Kingdom.
Angelicania, Bellona, Caroline Amelia, Diligentia, Helen, Phœbe, Queen, and Sylph	United Kingdom; Norway; Norway; United Kingdom; United Kingdom; United Kingdom; United Kingdom; United Kingdom	The full-rigged ship Diligentia was driven into at least twelve other vessels, including Angelicania, the Bellona brig Caroline Amelia, Helen and Queen before crushing Sylph against the quayside at South Shields. All vessels were damaged - Helen and Queen severely, as were two Norwegian brigs, a Dutch barque, a Rostock barque and a French schooner.
Ann and Isabella	United Kingdom	The schooner was damaged at South Shields.
Ann Curry, Dorothy, and Snowdon	United Kingdom	The barque Snowdon broke from her moorings and drove into the brig Dorothy and Ann Curry. All three vessels were damaged.
Ann E. Harper	United States	The ship was wrecked on the Horse Bank, in the Irish Sea off the coast of Lancashire, England. Her crew were rescued by the Lytham and Southport Lifeboats. She was on a voyage from Baltimore, Maryland to Liverpool, Lancashire.
Ark	United Kingdom	The sloop ran aground on the Newcombe Sand, in the North Sea off the coast of Suffolk and sank.
Asteria	United Kingdom	The ship was damaged in the River Tyne.
Augusta	United Kingdom	The barque capsized and sank at Wallsend, Northumberland with the loss of four of her five crew.
Azores	United Kingdom	The ship foundered off Aberystwyth, Cardiganshire.
Baron	United Kingdom	The fishing smack foundered in the Dogger Bank with the loss of all hands.
Bellona	Norway	The brig was damaged at South Shields.
British Merchant	United Kingdom	The ship was driven ashore at Lymington, Hampshire. She was on a voyage from Callao, Peru to Cowes, Isle of Wight. She was refloated and taken in to Cowes.
British Tar	United Kingdom	The ship was damaged at South Shields.
Brothers	United Kingdom	The ship was severely damaged at South Shields by other vessels driving into her.
Cambria	United Kingdom	The brig ran aground on Scroby Sands, Norfolk. Her crew were rescued by the Gorleston Lifeboat. She was on a voyage from South Shields to Cartagena, Spain. She was refloated and taken in to Great Yarmouth, Norfolk in a severely damaged condition.
Carrier Dove, and City of Ottawa	United States	The full-rigged ship Carrier Dove was driven into by City of Ottawa and severely damaged in the Sloyne. She was on a voyage from New York, United States to Liverpool. City of Ottawa was also severely damaged.
Carrina	United Kingdom	The ship was damaged in the River Tyne.
Carstairs	United Kingdom	The steamship ran aground off Osmussaar, Russia. She was on a voyage from Kronstadt, Russia to London.
Cassandra	United Kingdom	The ship was damaged in the River Tyne.
HMS Castor	Royal Navy	The training ship was damaged at North Shields, Northumberland when a Dutch barque drove into her.
Chanticleer, and Lorenzo	United Kingdom; United States	The full-rigged ship Lorenzo drove into the full-rigged ship Chanticleer at South Shields. Both vessels were damaged.
Christiana	Norway	The brig was wrecked "at Jadderen". Her crew were rescued. Shew as on a voyage from Åskard to Montrose, Forfarshire, Scotland.
Cœur de Lion	United Kingdom	The ship was run into in the River Tyne by a brig and another vessel and was damaged.
Conquest	United Kingdom	The ship was damaged in the River Tyne.
Constantine	United Kingdom	The ship was driven ashore near Blackpool, Lancashire. She was on a voyage from New York to Liverpool. She was refloated on 25 October and towed in to Liverpool.
Cresswell	United Kingdom	The ship was damaged in the River Tyne.
Cuba	Netherlands	The ship was driven ashore at Cap Gris-Nez, Pas-de-Calais, France. She was on a voyage from Surinam to Amsterdam, North Holland. She was a total loss.
Cubitt	United Kingdom	The ship was run down and sunk in the English Channel between Dover and Folkestone, Kent by City of Peking (United Kingdom). Her crew were rescued. Cubitt was on a voyage from Dover to Portsmouth, Hampshire.
Cumbria	United Kingdom	The ship was wrecked on the Barber Sand, in the North Sea off the coast of Norfolk. Her crew were rescued by the Gorleston Lifeboat.
Duncan Dunbar	United Kingdom	The schooner was driven ashore at Bawdsey, Suffolk. She was on a voyage from Scarborough, Yorkshire to London. She was refloated the next day and assisted in to Harwich, Essex.
Edina	United Kingdom	The ship was damaged at South Shields.
Electricity	United Kingdom	The fishing smack ran aground off Lindisfarne, Northumberland. She was refloated.
Elizabeth and Cecilia	(United Kingdom of Great Britain and Ireland) Guernsey	The ship was damaged in the River Tyne.
Experiment	United Kingdom	The schooner was abandoned in the North Sea off the coast of Essex. Her crew were rescued by two smacks. She was on a voyage from Newcastle upon Tyne, Northumberland to Teignmouth, Devon.
Fideli	Flag unknown	The ship was damaged at South Shields.
Franciska Maria	Austrian Empire	The barque capsized in the North Sea off the Farne Islands, Northumberland. She was on a voyage from Leith, Lothian, Scotland to South Shields. She was later righted and towed in to South Shields by a steamship
Free Briton	United Kingdom	The brig foundered in the North Sea off Cromer, Norfolk. Her crew were rescued by the fishing boat La Volonté de Dieu (France).
Germania	Kingdom of Hanover	The schooner was damaged at South Shields.
George	United Kingdom	The ship ran aground off Mablethorpe, Lincolnshire. She was on a voyage from Boulogne, Pas-de-Calais, France to Sunderland, County Durham. She was refloated and assisted in to Grimsby, Lincolnshire in a leaky condition.
Goliah	United Kingdom	The ship was damaged at South Shields.
Good Intent	United Kingdom	The colliar, a brig or brigantine, was driven ashore and wrecked at Aldeburgh, Suffolk with the loss of three of her seven crew. Survivors were rescued by the Coastguard using rocket apparatus. She was on a voyage from South Shields, County Durham to Teignmouth, Devon.
Gustav	France	The ship was severely damaged at South Shields.
Gustav Adolph	Flag unknown	The ship was damaged at South Shields.
Hannah Booth	United Kingdom	The schooner was driven ashore at Caister-on-Sea, Norfolk. Her crew were rescued by the Caister Lifeboat. She was later refloated and taken in to Great Yarmouth.
Harry King	United Kingdom	The brigantine was driven ashore and wrecked at Southwold, Suffolk. She was on a voyage from Newcastle upon Tyne to Dunkirk, Nord, France.
Hawthorne	United Kingdom	The ship was damaged in the River Tyne.
Hebe	United Kingdom	The ship was damaged in the River Tyne.
Helen Horsfall	United Kingdom	The ship was wrecked in Chale Bay, Isle of Wight. All on board were rescued by kite apparatus. She was on a voyage from Queenstown, County Cork to Alexandria, Egypt.
Hennette Kirstine	Sweden	The ship was driven ashore and wrecked on Skagen, Denmark. She was on a voyage from Ängelholm to London.
Henry	France	The schooner was damaged at North Shields.
Harry Everest	United Kingdom	The sailing barge was driven ashore at Thorpeness, Suffolk. Her four crew were rescued by the Ipswich Lifeboat. She was on a voyage from Middlesbrough, Yorkshire to Rochester, Kent.
Herald	United Kingdom	The ship ran aground off Osmussaar. She was on a voyage from Kronstadt to London. She subsequently became a wreck.
Hercules	United Kingdom	The ship was driven from her moorings in the River Tyne and ran aground. She sank two Tyne Keels.
Hippocampi	United Kingdom	The brig was driven onto the Girdler Sand, in the North Sea off the coast of Kent. She was on a voyage from Algiers, Algeria to London. She was later refloated and taken in to Margate, Kent in a derelict condition.
Hornby	United Kingdom	The barque foundered in the Atlantic Ocean. All on board were rescued by the brig Marie (France). Hornby was on a voyage from Montreal, Province of Canada to Whitehaven, Cumberland and/or London.
Hugh, and London	United Kingdom	The collier, brig Hugh collided with the schooner London off the coast of Suffolk. Two of London's four crew got on board Hugh. She was then driven ashore and wrecked at Sizewell with the loss of four lives (three crew and the captain of London). Survivors were rescued by a French vessel. London was on a voyage from South Shields to London. She was also driven ashore at Sizewell, where her remaining crew were rescued. She was on a voyage from Middlesbrough to Rochester
Humility	United Kingdom	The brig was damaged at South Shields.
Integrity	United Kingdom	The ship struck the Barber Sand, in the North Sea off the coast of Norfolk and sank. Her crew were rescued. She was on a voyage from Hartlepool, County Durham to Portsmouth.
Ivo	United Kingdom	The ship was damaged in the River Tyne.
Jeanette	Netherlands	The schooner was damaged at South Shields.
Jessie	United Kingdom	The ship foundered in the North Sea 120 nautical miles (220 km) east south east of Peterhead, Aberdeenshire. Her crew were rescued by a Dutch fishing smack. She was on a voyage from Sunderland to Aberdeen.
Johanus Martinus	Netherlands	The ship was damaged in the River Tyne.
John	United Kingdom	The ship ran aground on Scroby Sands. Her crew were rescued. She was refloated and taken in to Great Yarmouth in a leaky condition.
Joseph	France	The lugger was driven ashore between Breaksea Point and Sully Island, Glamorgan, Wales.
Juliet	United Kingdom	The schooner was wrecked on the Gunfleet Sand, in the North Sea off the coast of Essex.
Lady Dundas	United Kingdom	The brig was driven ashore at Felixtowe, Suffolk. She was on a voyage from Hartlepool to London. She was refloated the next day and beached at Woodbridge, Suffolk, where she ran aground. She was again refloated.
Laura	United Kingdom	The ship was damaged in the River Tyne.
Leocadia	United Kingdom	The ship foundered off Holyhead, Anglesey with the loss of all on board. She was on a voyage from Baltimore to Liverpool.
Little Nell	United Kingdom	The ship was damaged at South Shields.
Luna	United Kingdom	The sloop sank in the Humber. Both crew were rescued.
Macedonia	United Kingdom	The brig was driven from her moorings and damaged at South Shields.
Marie	France	The brig ran aground off Vlissingen, Zeeland, Netherlands. She was on a voyage from Antwerp, Belgium to Newcastle upon Tyne.
Margaret	United Kingdom	The ship was damaged in the River Tyne.
Marsden	United Kingdom	The ship was driven into by Astrea (United Kingdom) and Elizabeth and Cicely ( (United Kingdom of Great Britain and Ireland) Guernsey) in the River Tyne and other vessels. She was driven ashore and severely damaged.
Mary	United Kingdom	The brig drove against the quayside and sank at South Shields.
Mary Ann	United Kingdom	The ship was driven ashore and damaged at Bridlington, Yorkshire.
Mary Grace	United Kingdom	The ship was severely damaged in the River Tyne when the barque Union (United Kingdom drove into her.
Mary Sharp	United Kingdom	The ship was wrecked on the Kentish Knock. Her crew were rescued by Imperatrice (France).
Mathilde	United Kingdom	The ship was damaged in the River Tyne.
May	United Kingdom	The ship sank in the River Tyne.
Messenger	United Kingdom	The tug was damaged in the River Tyne.
Minho	United Kingdom	American Civil War, Union blockade: Pursued by the gunboat USS Flambeau (United States Navy) while attempting to run the Union blockade with a cargo of rifle muskets and swords, the 400-Gross register ton screw steamer struck a sunken vessel and was wrecked on Drunken Dick Shoal outside Charleston Harbor in Charleston, South Carolina, Confederate States of America.
Nelson	United Kingdom	The brig was driven into the lock gates and damaged at North Shields.
Northumberland	United Kingdom	The barque was driven ashore in the River Lune. She was on a voyage from a port in British North America to Glasson Dock, Lancashire. She was refloated on 22 October and towed in to Glasson Dock.
Nymph	France	The schooner was driven ashore between Breaksea Point and Sully Island. Her crew were rescued. She was on a voyage from Cardiff, Glamorgan to Nantes, Loire-Inférieure.
Othello	United Kingdom	The ship was damaged in the River Tyne.
Panope	United Kingdom	The brig was damaged at North Shields.
Penningham	United Kingdom	The barque was abandoned on the Kentish Knock. All on board were rescued by the steamship Feyenoord (Netherlands). Penningham was on a voyage from Jamaica to London. She was discovered derelict 15 nautical miles (28 km) off North Foreland, Kent by Ocean (United Kingdom), which put a skeleton crew aboard, as did a steamship. She subsequently foundered 1.5 nautical miles (2.8 km) off the Galloper Lightship ( Trinity House).
Perlew	Norway	The brig was damaged at South Shields.
Pilot	United Kingdom	The tug was damaged in the River Tyne.
Port Glasgow	United Kingdom	The schooner ran aground on the Sizewell Bank, in the North Sea off the coast of Suffolk and was wrecked. Her crew were rescued by rocket apparatus. She was on a voyage from Warkworth, Northumberland to Boulogne, Pas-de-Calais, France.
Premier	United Kingdom	The brig was abandoned in the Atlantic Ocean. Her crew were rescued by Ganges (United Kingdom). Premier was on a voyage from New York to Tralee, County Kerry.
Pujeno	Kingdom of Hanover	The steamship was driven ashore near Stettin. She was on a voyage from Newcastle upon Tyne to Stralsund. She was refloated and towed in to Helsingør, Denmark in a leaky condition.
Quiasa Rosa	Italy	The ship was driven ashore and wrecked at Formby, Lancashire with the loss of all hands. She was on a voyage from Ardrossan, Ayrshire, United Kingdom to Genoa.
Queen	United Kingdom	The brig was severely damaged at South Shields.
Robert and Anne	United Kingdom	The tug sank in the River Tyne.
Robert and Mary	United Kingdom	The steamship sank in the River Tyne.
HMS Sandfly	United Kingdom	The Albacore-class gunboat was severely damaged at North Shields when a Dutch barque drove into her.
Sceptre	United Kingdom	The ship was damaged at South Shields.
Sea Nymph	United Kingdom	The ship ran aground on Scroby Sands and sank. Her crew were rescued by Orion (United Kingdom.
Sir Allen McNab	United Kingdom	The ship was driven ashore and wrecked on the French coast. Her crew were rescued by the steamship Emerald (Belgium). Sir Allen Mcnab was on a voyage from Quebec City, Province of Canada, British North America to London.
Sir Henry Parnell	United Kingdom	The brig was driven ashore at South Shields.
Sisters	United Kingdom	The ship was severely damaged in the Pool of London when tow other vessels broke their moorings and ran into her.
Spring	United Kingdom	The ship was damaged at South Shields.
Sumner	United Kingdom	The barque was driven from her moorings and damaged at South Shields.
Thetis	United Kingdom	The ship capsized in the North Sea with the loss of seven of her eleven crew. She was on a voyage from Sundsvall, Norway to Exmouth, Devon.
Triton	United Kingdom	The ship was severely damaged at South Shields.
Tramp	United Kingdom	The tug sank in the River Tyne.
Two Brothers	United Kingdom	The sloop foundered in the North Sea 8 nautical miles (15 km) north of the Dudgeon Lightship ( Trinity House). A crew member was rescued by a foreign schooner. Three people were rescued by the schooner Susannah (United Kingdom). She was on a voyage from Newcastle upon Tyne to London.
Urania	United Kingdom	The schooner probably foundered in the North Sea with the loss of all four crew. A message in a bottle washed up on the Norwegian coast on 30 December. The message stated that it was feared she would sink. She was on a voyage from Sunderland to Dundee.
Useful	United Kingdom	The brig capsized and sank at South Shields.
Violet	United Kingdom	The smack ran aground on the Pan Sand, off the north Kent coast. She was subsequently taken in to Margate in a derelict condition by the Margate Lifeboat.
Volusia	United Kingdom	The ship was wrecked at Flamborough Head, Yorkshire. Her crew were rescued. She was on a voyage from South Shields to Great Yarmouth.
Water Kelpie	United Kingdom	The ship was damaged in the River Tyne.
Waterlily	United Kingdom	The ship was driven ashore and wrecked at Rattray Head, Aberdeenshire. Her crew were rescued. She was on a voyage from New York to Leith.
William and Ann	United Kingdom	The steamship sank at South Shields.
William Bradley	United Kingdom	The brig was damaged in the River Tyne.
William Tell	Grand Duchy of Mecklenburg-Schwerin	The brig was damaged at South Shields.
Willie Radley	United Kingdom	The ship was damaged in the River Tyne.
Woden	Norway	The ship was damaged in the River Tyne.
Unnamed	United Kingdom	The Whitehill Point ferryboat was severely damaged at South Shields by other vessels driving into her.
Unnamed	United Kingdom	The fireboat was run into by the full-rigged ship Lorenzo (United States and sank at South Shields.
Unnamed	United Kingdom	The ship was abandoned off the north Kent coast. All 30 people on board were rescued by the steamship Emerald (Belgium). The ship was on a voyage from Quebec City to London. She subsequently came ashore at the North Foreland.
Unnamed	United Kingdom	The shrimp boat struck the wreck of Integrity (United Kingdom) and foundered. Her three crew got aboard the wreck. They were rescued by a Caister yawl.

== 21 October ==
List of shipwrecks: 21 October 1862
Ship	State	Description
Alma	United Kingdom	The ship was driven ashore and wrecked on "Werlinskar", Norway. Her crew were rescued. She was on a voyage from London to Helsingør, Denmark.
Amity	United Kingdom	The collier, a brig, foundered off the mouth of the Humber. Her crew were rescued by the smack Tartar (United Kingdom). Amity was on a voyage from Whitby, Yorkshire to Rochester, Kent.
Ann	United Kingdom	The lugger sank in the North Sea off the coast of Suffolk. Eleven of her crew were rescued by Etoile (France).
Ann Augusta	United Kingdom	The ship ran aground in the Belfast Lough. She was on a voyage from Belfast, County Antrim to New York, United States. She was refloated and resumed her voyage.
Bencoolen	United Kingdom	The East Indiaman was wrecked at Bude, Cornwall with the loss of 27 of her 33 crew. She was on a voyage from Liverpool, Lancashire to Bombay, India.
Deux Joachime	France	The ship was wrecked at the mouth of the Adour. Her crew were rescued. She was on a voyage from Vannes, Morbihan to Bayonne, Basses-Pyrénées.
Elizabeth	United Kingdom	The barque ran aground on the Kentish Knock. Her crew got aboard the Knock Lightship ( Trinity House). Elizabeth was on a voyage from Hartlepool, County Durham to Shoreham-by-Sea, Sussex. She was towed in to Great Yarmouth, Norfolk on 23 October.
Experient	United Kingdom	The ship sprang a leak and foundered off the coast of West Flanders, Belgium. Her crew were rescued.
Feika Johanna	Netherlands	The koff was driven ashore and wrecked on Normandshage. Her crew were rescued. She was on a voyage from Newcastle upon Tyne, Northumberland, United Kingdom to Kappeln, Duchy of Holstein.
Harmonie	Kingdom of Hanover	The ship was driven ashore and wrecked at Rantrum, Duchy of Schleswig. Her crew were rescued. She was on a voyage from the Humber to Glückstadt, Duchy of Schleswig.
Industry	United Kingdom	The brigantine was driven ashore and wrecked at "Ballycroness", County Cork. Five crew were rescued. She was on a voyage from Runcorn, Cheshire to Queenstown, County Cork.
Lark	United Kingdom	The ship foundered in the Baltic Sea off Osmussaar, Russia. She was on a voyage from Saint Petersburg, Russia to London.
Laura	Denmark	The schooner collided with a Prussian brig and foundered off Jomfruland, Norway. Her crew were rescued. She was on a voyage from Rostock to London.
Maria	Netherlands	The ship was driven ashore near "Velzen". Her crew were rescued. She was on a voyage from Groningen to Port Talbot, Glamorgan, Wales. She subsequently broke up.
Ocean	Norway	The brig was driven ashore and wrecked at Thisted, Denmark. Her crew were rescued. She was on a voyage from Newcastle upon Tyne, Northumberland, England to Christiania.
Pilot	Confederate States of America	American Civil War, Union blockade: The schooner was captured and burned off the coast of Florida by the sidewheel gunboat USS E. B. Hale (United States Navy).
Providence	United Kingdom	The sloop was driven ashore at Équihen, Pas-de-Calais, France. Her crew were rescued. She was on a voyage from London to Rouen, Seine-Inférieure, France.
Rena	Hamburg	The ship was driven ashore near Hunseby, Denmark. She was on a voyage from Glückstadt, Duchy of Holstein to Hartlepool.
Sovereign	United Kingdom	The brig foundered in the North Sea 50 nautical miles (93 km) off the mouth of the Humber. Her eight crew were rescued by the fishing smack Intrepid (United Kingdom).
William and Jane	United Kingdom	The collier, a brig, foundered in the North Sea 20 nautical miles (37 km) east of the Dudgeon Lightship ( Trinity House). Her crew were rescued by the barque Emily (United Kingdom). William and Jane was on a voyage from Sunderland, County Durham to the Nieuw Diep.
Young	United Kingdom	The brig foundered off Great Yarmouth, Norfolk. Her crew were rescued. She was on a voyage from South Shields, County Durham to Lowestoft, Suffolk.
Unnamed	Flag unknown	The schooner foundered in the North Sea. Her six crew were rescued by a boat from the fishing smack Alarm or Lady (United Kingdom) but the boat was swamped with the loss of all on board, including two crew from Alarm.

== 22 October ==
List of shipwrecks: 22 October 1862
Ship	State	Description
Adelaide	Confederate States of America	American Civil War, Union blockade: Bound from Wilmington, North Carolina, for Halifax, Nova Scotia, British North America with a cargo of turpentine, cotton, and tobacco, the schooner was forced aground on the coast of North Carolina by the gunboat USS Ellis (United States Navy). Her crew set her on fire and abandoned her, but crewmen from Ellis boarded her and extinguished the fire. Ellis took the captured schooner under tow, but Adelaide kept running aground, and Ellis finally destroyed her about one mile (1.6 km) north of New Topsail Inlet, North Carolina.
Adolph	Prussia	The ship was driven ashore at Espoo, Grand Duchy of Finland. She was on a voyage from Königsberg to London, United Kingdom. She had been destroyed in a storm by 18 November.
Bencoolen	United Kingdom	The ship was driven ashore and wrecked at Bude, Cornwall with the loss of all but six of her crew. She was on a voyage from Liverpool, Lancashire to Bombay, India.
C. S. M.	United Kingdom	The brig ran aground on the Gunfleet Sand, in the North Sea, off the coast of Essex. Her crew were rescued. She was on a voyage from Newcastle upon Tyne, Northumberland to London. She floated off but consequently foundered on the West Rocks. On 24 October, the wreck capsized, drowning ten of the thirteen men on board who were stripping the wreck. They formed part of the crews of the smacks Cyrene, Lord Howe, Koh-i-Noor and Ranger (all United Kingdom).
Faithful	United Kingdom	The ship foundered in the North Sea off Aldeburgh, Suffolk. Her crew were rescued. She was on a voyage from Goole, Yorkshire to Maldon, Essex.
George IV	United Kingdom	The brig was abandoned in the North Sea 120 nautical miles (220 km) south west of Lindesnes, Norway. Her crew were rescued by Anna Maria Thomas (United Kingdom). George IV was on a voyage from Rochester, Kent to West Hartlepool, County Durham. She was subsequently taken in to the Landerfjord in a derelict condition.
Grace	United Kingdom	The ketch was driven ashore in the Cattewater. Her crew were rescued.
Hercules	United Kingdom	The steamship foundered in the Silver Pits. Her 23 crew were rescued by a Danish yacht. Hercules was on a voyage from Danzig to London.
Iteyn	United Kingdom	The ship was driven ashore at Milford Haven, Pembrokeshire and was scuttled.
Jessie	United Kingdom	The schooner ran aground at Swinemünde, Prussia.
Laconic	United Kingdom	The ship was driven ashore at Black Pill, Glamorgan. She was refloated on 23 October and taken in to a port.
Marian	United Kingdom	The ship was driven ashore and wrecked at Berck, Pas-de-Calais, France. She was on a voyage from Newcastle upon Tyne to Bridgwater, Somerset.
Meika	Italy	The brig was driven ashore at Waterloo, Lancashire. She was on a voyage from Livorno to Liverpool. Although condemned, she was refloated on 22 December and towed in to Liverpool.
Olive	United Kingdom	The snow foundered off Great Yarmouth, Norfolk. Her eight crew were rescued by the fishing boat Renaissance (France). Olive was on a voyage from Newcastle upon Tyne, Northumberland to London.
Pandora	United Kingdom	The brig foundered off Calais, France. Her crew survived. She was on a voyage from Middlesbrough, Yorkshire to Boulogne, Pas-de-Calais, France.
Place	United Kingdom	The ship was driven ashore at Queen Anne's Battery, Plymouth, Devon and sank. She was refloated and taken in to Sutton Pool.
Queen	United Kingdom	The ship foundered in the North Sea 25 nautical miles (46 km) off the Dutch coast. She was on a voyage from Sunderland, County Durham to Portsmouth, Hampshire.
Robert and Margaret	United Kingdom	The collier, a brig, foundered off the mouth of the River Humber with the loss of six of her nine crew. Survivors were rescued by the smack Tartar (United Kingdom).
HMS Vigilant	Royal Navy	The Vigilant-class gunvessel ran aground on the Gunfleet Sand. She was on a voyage from Scotland to Sheerness, Kent. She was refloated and resumed her voyage.
Windsor	United Kingdom	The ship was abandoned off Cape Horn, Chile. She was on a voyage from Cardiff, Glamorgan to Panama City, Granadine Confederation.

== 23 October ==
List of shipwrecks: 23 October 1862
Ship	State	Description
Atlantic	United Kingdom	The barque was wrecked at Thisted, Denmark. Her crew were rescued. She was on a voyage from Honfleur, Manche, France to Sunderland, County Durham.
Black Eagle	(United Kingdom of Great Britain and Ireland) British North America	The barque foundered off the Calf of Man, Isle of Man with the loss of two of her crew. Survivors were rescued by the schooner James Gardner (United Kingdom). Black Eagle was on a voyage from New York to Glasgow, Renfrewshire.
Copia	United Kingdom	The barque was driven ashore at Troon, Ayrshire. She was on a voyage from Greenock, Renfrewshire to Demerara, British Guiana. She was refloated and taken in to Troon.
Coquet	United Kingdom	The brig foundered in the North Sea between the Gelbsand and the Vogelsand. Her crew were rescued. She was on a voyage from Sunderland to Hamburg.
Drake	United Kingdom	The ship was abandoned in the North Sea off the coast of Yorkshire. Her crew were rescued by a fishing smack. She was on a voyage from Seaham, County Durham to Great Yarmouth or vice versa.
Elizabeth	United Kingdom	The schooner ran aground in the Agger Canal. Her crew were rescued. She was on a voyage from Arbroath, Forfarshire to Sunderland, County Durham. She was refloated on 21 January 1863 and taken in to Thisted, Denmark.
Else	Denmark	The brigantine was wrecked on Grand Cayman, Cayman Islands. Her crew survived. She was on a voyage from Liverpool, Lancashire, United Kingdom to Matamoros, Mexico.
Eva	United Kingdom	The ship was driven ashore and wrecked on Saaremaa, Russia. Her crew were rescued. She was on a voyage from London to Riga, Russia.
Fredericke	Sweden	The ship ran aground and sank on "Maederaebod". She was on a voyage from Sunderland to Malmö.
Henriette	Kingdom of Hanover	The brig was driven ashore near Hunseby, Denmark. She was on a voyage from Hamburg to Stockton-on-Tees, County Durham, England.
Industry	United Kingdom	The barque was damaged by fire at London.
James Gardner	United Kingdom	The schooner was driven ashore at Douglas, Isle of Man. She was on a voyage from Liverpool to Aarhus, Denmark. She was refloated.
Johanna	Danzig	The ship was driven ashore near Gothenburg, Sweden. She was on a voyage from London to Danzig. She was refloated.
Lafayette	United States	American Civil War, CSS Alabama's New England Expeditionary Raid: The 945-ton barque, carrying a cargo of corn, lard, pipe staves, and wheat from New York to Belfast, County Antrim, Ireland, was captured and burned in the North Atlantic Ocean south of Halifax, Nova Scotia, British North America, at 39°34′50″N 63°26′00″W by the screw sloop-of-war CSS Alabama (Confederate States Navy).
Mary	United Kingdom	The schooner was driven ashore at Peterhead, Aberdeenshire. She was on a voyage from Aberdeen to Fraserburgh, Aberdeenshire. She was refloated.
Mary O'Brien	United Kingdom	The ship ran aground on Pluckington Bank, in Liverpool Bay. She was on a voyage from Bassein, India to Liverpool. Mary O'Brien was refloated and taken in to the River Mersey in a sinking condition. She was taken in to Liverpool on 24 October.
Matthew	United Kingdom	The ship was driven ashore and wrecked near "Tolstrup", Denmark. Her crew were rescued. She was on a voyage from Sunderland, County Durham to Shoreham-by-Sea, Sussex.
Penton	United Kingdom	The brig foundered off the Dutch coast with the loss of all hands.
Petrel	United Kingdom	The schooner ran aground on the Gunfleet Sand, in the North Sea off the coast of Essex. She was refloated and assisted in to Harwich, Essex in a severely leaky condition.
Pioneer	United Kingdom	The barque was driven ashore at Natal.
Princess Marie	United Kingdom	The schooner capsized and was wrecked at Fleetwood, Lancashire. Her crew survived. She was on a voyage from Dundalk, County Louth to Preston, Lancashire. She was refloated on 23 November with the assistance of three Mersey Flats and taken in to Fleetwood.
Queen	United Kingdom	The collier, a brig foundered in the North Sea. Her crew survived. She was on a voyage from Sunderland, County Durham to Portsmouth, Hampshire.
Refuge	United Kingdom	The brig ran aground off Lowestoft, Suffolk.
Royal Saxon	United Kingdom	The ship was wrecked on the coast of Newfoundland, British North America. Her crew were rescued. She was on a voyage from Montreal, Province of Canada, British North America to an English port.
Sisters	United Kingdom	The brig was driven ashore near Glückstadt, Duchy of Schleswig.
Tordenskjold	Norway	The brig was driven ashore and wrecked near Farsund. Her crew were rescued. She was on a voyage from Lemvig to Newcastle upon Tyne, Northumberland, England.

== 24 October ==
List of shipwrecks: 24 October 1862
Ship	State	Description
Acme	United Kingdom	The ship was driven ashore at Waterloo, Lancashire. She was on a voyage from Quebec City, Province of Canada, British North America to Liverpool, Lancashire. She was refloated and put back to Liverpool.
Edwin and Lizzie	United Kingdom	The ship was driven ashore and wrecked at Cape Tormentine, New Brunswick, British North America. She was on a voyage from Richibucto, New Brunswick to Liverpool.
Enigheden	Norway	The ship was driven ashore at Farsund.
Fremont	United Kingdom	The ship was wrecked on the Kalkgrund, in the Baltic Sea. Her crew were rescued. She was on a voyage from Narva, Russia to West Hartlepool, County Durham.
Hero	United States	The full-rigged ship ran aground at Ekenäs, Grand Duchy of Finland.
Hindoo	United Kingdom	The ship was driven ashore and caught fire at Waterloo with the loss of five of her crew and two seriously injured. She was on a voyage from Montreal, Province of Canada to Liverpool. She was a total loss.
Peter Senn	United Kingdom	The brig was abandoned in the North Sea 40 nautical miles (74 km) off Flamborough Head, Yorkshire. Her crew were rescued by the smack Godbold (United Kingdom). She was discovered by the smack Besdale and towed in to Hull, Yorkshire.
Pinus	Norway	The ship was driven ashore at Kristiansand. She was on a voyage from Risør to Hull.
Sedgefield	United Kingdom	The brig foundered in the North Sea. Her crew were rescued by Emmanuel (United Kingdom). Sedgefield was on a voyage from Sunderland, County Durham to Hamburg.
Susan G. Owens	United Kingdom	The ship ran aground on the Krantsand. She later floated off and ran aground on the Medemsand. She was refloated with assistance from the steamship Assensadean (Hamburg) and towed in to Glückstadt.
Tremont	United Kingdom	The ship ran aground on the Kalkgrund, in the Baltic Sea and was wrecked. Her crew were rescued. She was on a voyage from "Nuova" to West Hartlepool, County Durham.

== 25 October ==
List of shipwrecks: 25 October 1862
Ship	State	Description
Augusta	Spain	The brigantine was driven ashore and wrecked at Veracruz, Mexico.
Branch	United Kingdom	The schooner struck rocks off Bognor, Sussex, capsized and was wrecked. Her crew survived. She was on a voyage from Sunderland, County Durham to Southampton, Hampshire.
Chaptal	French Navy	The corvette was driven ashore and wrecked at Veracruz.
Concepcion	Mexico	The pilot boat was driven ashore and wrecked at Veracruz.
Conqueror	United Kingdom	The brig was driven ashore and wrecked at Veracruz.
HMS Conqueror	Royal Navy	The Caledonia-class ship of the line was driven ashore at "Sacraficios", Mexico.
Dapeen	United Kingdom	The ship ran aground off Cardiff, Glamorgan. She was on a voyage from Bristol, Gloucestershire to Jersey, Channel Islands. She was refloated with the assistance of three tugs and towed in to Bristol in a leaky condition.
Diddlesfold	United Kingdom	The ship was abandoned in the North Sea 25 nautical miles (46 km) east north east of the mouth of the Humber. Her crew were rescued by Valiant (United Kingdom).
Echo	United States	The barque was driven ashore and wrecked at Veracruz.
Empressario	Mexico	The pilot boat was driven ashore and wrecked at Veracruz.
Felicie	France	The barque was driven ashore and wrecked at Veracruz.
Flash	United States	The barque was driven ashore and wrecked at Veracruz.
Gepkina	Duchy of Holstein	The ship was driven ashore and wrecked at Lemvig. Her crew were rescued. She was on a voyage from Neustadt in Holstein to Macduff, Aberdeenshire, United Kingdom.
Hanseatic	Spain	The ship was driven ashore and wrecked at Veracruz.
Hoffnung	United States	The brig was towed in to Tønning, Duchy of Holstein in a waterlogged condition. She was on a voyage from Hartlepool, County Durham to Varel, Kingdom of Hanover. She was declared a total loss.
Hylton	United Kingdom	The brig was abandoned in the North Sea with the loss of three of her nine crew. Survivors were rescued by the steamship Tiger (United Kingdom).
Mary Emma	United States	The steam pilot boat was driven ashore and wrecked at Veracruz.
Mary Waugh	United Kingdom	The brig was driven ashore and wrecked at Veracruz.
Mathilde	France	The barque was driven ashore and wrecked at Veracruz.
Nautille	France	The barque was driven ashore and wrecked at "Sacraficio".
Olive	United Kingdom	The barque foundered in the North Sea. Her crew were rescued by Germania (United Kingdom). Olive was on a voyage from London to Sunderland.
Oregon	United Kingdom	The schooner was run into by Myrtle (United Kingdom) and foundered off Harwich, Essex. Her crew were rescued by Myrtle. Oregon was on a voyage from Sunderland to London.
Richard	Norway	The ship was lost off Ny-Hellesund with the loss of eight of her thirteen crew.
Sheridan	United States	The steamship was driven ashore and wrecked at Veracruz.
Spee	Kingdom of Hanover	The schooner was abandoned in the North Sea. Her crew were rescued by the pilot boat No. 4 (Netherlands). Spee was on a voyage from Hartlepool to Boulogne, France, or from Newcastle upon Tyne, Northumberland, England to Malmö, Sweden.
St. Louis	France	The barque foundered in the Atlantic Ocean. There were two survivors of the 29 people on board. She was on a voyage from Beyrout, Ottoman Syria to Falmouth, Cornwall, Plymouth, Devon, or Queenstown, County Cork.
Vivid	United Kingdom	The brig was driven ashore and wrecked at Veracruz.

== 26 October ==
List of shipwrecks: 26 October 1862
Ship	State	Description
Ann Stainton	United Kingdom	The ship was damaged by fire at Bornholm, Denmark. She was on a voyage from "Wyburg" to Hartlepool, County Durham.
Calisto	Bremen	The brig foundered off Norderney, Kingdom of Hanover. Her crew survived.
Crenshaw	United States	American Civil War, CSS Alabama's New England Expeditionary Raid: The 279-ton schooner, carrying a cargo of grain from New York to Glasgow, Renfrewshire, United Kingdom, was captured and burned in the North Atlantic Ocean (40°11′28″N 64°32′15″W) by the screw sloop-of-war CSS Alabama (Confederate States Navy).
Dolphin	United Kingdom	The ship ran aground off Skagen, Denmark. Her crew were rescued. She was on a voyage from Sunderland, County Durham to Nibe, Denmark.
Elizabeth Jane	United Kingdom	The brig capsized in the North Sea off Terschelling, Friesland, Netherlands. Five of her eight crew were rescued by the smack Patience (United Kingdom). Elizabeth Jane was on a voyage from London to Memel, Prussia. Elizabeth Jane was discovered by the fishing smack Miranda and Fanny (United Kingdom) and towed in to Hull, Yorkshire.
Emeline	United Kingdom	The brig was abandoned in the North Sea 11 nautical miles (20 km) off Heligoland. Her crew were rescued. She was on a voyage from London to South Shields, County Durham.
Fadrenes Inmoe	Norway	The ship was driven ashore at Kristiansand. She was on a voyage from Sandefjord to Leith, Lothian, Scotland.
Mariner	United Kingdom	The schooner was abandoned in the North Sea 25 nautical miles (46 km) off Sylt, Duchy of Holstein. Her crew were rescued by Concordia (Norway). Mariner was on a voyage from Griefswald to London.
Residue	United Kingdom	The schooner ran aground on the Brake Sand. She was on a voyage from Sunderland, County Durham to Portsmouth, Hampshire. She was refloated with the assistance of a lifeboat and a tug and taken in to Ramsgate, Kent.
Wanderer	United Kingdom	The ship was abandoned in the Dogger Bank. Her crew were rescued by Isis (United Kingdom). Wanderer was on a voyage from King's Lynn, Norfolk to Hartlepool, County Durham.

== 27 October ==
List of shipwrecks: 27 October 1862
Ship	State	Description
Augustus McDowell	United States	The 451-ton sidewheel paddle steamer burned on the Mississippi River in a large wharf fire at St. Louis, Missouri.
Birgita Margrette	Denmark	The schooner was lost in the Eider with the loss of two of her crew. She was on a voyage from Gothenburg, Sweden to London, United Kingdom.
Ceres	United Kingdom	The ship ran aground on the Salthouse Bank, in the Irish Sea off the coast of Lancashire and was damaged. She was refloated with assistance from the Lytham Lifeboat.
Estrella	United States	The 414-ton sidewheel paddle steamer burned on the Mississippi River in a large wharf fire at St. Louis, Missouri.
Fanny	United Kingdom	The brigantine foundered in the North Sea 15 nautical miles (28 km) off Texel, North Holland, Netherlands. Her crew were rescued by the smack Persian (United Kingdom). Fanny was on a voyage from Caen, Calvados, France to South Shields, County Durham.
H. D. Bacon	United States	The 370-ton sidewheel paddle steamer burned on the Mississippi River in a large wharf fire at St. Louis, Missouri.
Helene	United Kingdom	The collier, a brig, was driven ashore and wrecked on Föhr, Duchy of Holstein. Her six crew were rescued.
Norfolk	United Kingdom	The steamship was driven ashore near Brielle, South Holland, Netherlands. She was refloated on 29 October.
Padgona	United Kingdom	The ship was abandoned off Holyhead, Anglesey. Her crew were rescued by at tug. She was on a voyage from Quebec City, Province of Canada, British North America to Lancaster, Lancashire. She subsequently drove ashore and was wrecked.
Shepherd	United Kingdom	The brig ran aground on the Longsand, in the North Sea off the coast of Essex. She was refloated but sank in the Wallet Channel. She was refloated with assistance from Volunteer (United Kingdom and assisted in to Harwich by four smacks and a tug. She was beached there.
T. L. McGill	United States	The 598-ton sidewheel paddle steamer burned on the Mississippi River in a large wharf fire at St. Louis, Missouri.
Union Canal	United Kingdom	The ship was driven ashore at Dartmouth, Devon. She was on a voyage from Plymouth, Devon to Portsmouth, Hampshire. She was refloated and taken in to Dartmouth in a leaky condition.
William and James	United Kingdom	The ship was wrecked on Mutton Island, County Galway. She was on a voyage from New York, United States to Galway.
William H. Russell	United States	The 405-ton sidewheel paddle steamer burned on the Mississippi River in a large wharf fire at St. Louis, Missouri.

== 28 October ==
List of shipwrecks: 28 October 1862
Ship	State	Description
Alida	United Kingdom	The ship was wrecked on the Randzel, in the North Sea off the coast of the Kingdom of Hanover. Her crew were rescued. She was on a voyage from London to Swansea, Glamorgan.
Branchory	United Kingdom	The brig was abandoned in the North Sea off the coast of the Duchy of Holstein. Her five crew survived.
Drie Gesusters	Netherlands	The koff foundered in the North Sea 6 nautical miles (11 km) north west of Heligoland. Her crew were rescued by Johan Geerdiuu (Netherlands). Drie Gesusters was on a voyage from Newcastle upon Tyne, Northumberland, United Kingdom to Groningen.
Lauretta	United States	American Civil War, CSS Alabama's New England Expeditionary Raid: The 284-ton bark, bound from New York to the Mediterranean with a cargo of flour, herring, nails, and pipe staves, was captured and burned in the North Atlantic Ocean south of Halifax, Nova Scotia, British North America (39°18′47″N 67°35′00″W) by the screw sloop-of-war CSS Alabama (Confederate States Navy).
Margaret	United Kingdom	The brig was abandoned in the North Sea. Her crew were rescued by Dorothea (United Kingdom. Some of her crew reboarded her the next day and she was towed in to Hartlepool, County Durham.
Martha Sawyer	United Kingdom	The ship was driven ashore at Manicouagan, Province of Canada, British North America. She was on a voyage from Quebec City, Province of Canada to Conwy, Caernarfonshire.
Port Mulgrove	United Kingdom	The steamship was wrecked at Souter Point, Northumberland. Her crew were rescued.
Ruby	(United Kingdom of Great Britain and Ireland) British North America	The derelict sealer was driven ashore on Tiree, Inner Hebrides.

== 29 October ==
List of shipwrecks: 29 October 1862
Ship	State	Description
Helene	Stralsund	The brig capsized in Loch Foltark, Skye, Outer Hebrides, United Kingdom.
Phantom	United Kingdom	The ship sank in the North Sea. Her crew were rescued by a Danish schooner.

== 30 October ==
List of shipwrecks: 30 October 1862
Ship	State	Description
Dove	United Kingdom	The ship departed from departed from Bristol, Gloucestershire for Newfoundland, British North America. No further trace, presumed foundered with the loss of all hands.
Drontheim	Norway	The brig was driven ashore and wrecked in Loch Tarbert. Her crew were rescued.
Free Trade	United Kingdom	The ship was abandoned in the Atlantic Ocean. Her crew were rescued by the full-rigged ship Montebello (United Kingdom). Free Trade was on a voyage from London to New York, United States.
Jessie	United Kingdom	The brigantine foundered in the North Sea 120 nautical miles (220 km) north east of Peterhead, Aberdeenshire. Her crew were rescued by a Dutch fishing smack. She was on a voyage from Sunderland, County Durham to Aberdeen.
Treumais	France	The ship collided with a British steamship and sank off Padstow, Cornwall, United Kingdom with the loss of two of her six crew. She was on a voyage from Swansea, Glamorgan to La Rochelle, Charente-Inférieure.
Windrush	United Kingdom	The schooner foundered in the Mediterranean Sea off Oliva, Spain with the loss of four of her five crew. The survivor was rescued by San Antonio (Spain).
Zitto	Italy	The ship was in collision with a barque and was then run ashore 12 nautical miles (22 km) east of Almería, Spain. She was on a voyage from Messina, Sicily to London.

== 31 October ==
List of shipwrecks: 31 October 1862
Ship	State	Description
Bergman	United States	The ship departed from New York for London, United Kingdom. No further trace, presumed foundered with the loss of all hands.
Grace Evans	United Kingdom	The schooner was run into by the frigate Feyz-i Cihat ( (Ottoman Empire) Egyptian Navy) in the River Mersey and was severely damaged. She was towed in to Liverpool, Lancashire.
Rosina	United Kingdom	The ship was driven ashore. She was on a voyage from Gävle, Sweden to London. She was refloated on 4 November and taken in to Baltic Port.
Seabor Brother	Hamburg	The ship foundered in the North Sea 75 nautical miles (139 km) off Heligoland. Her eight crew were rescued by the schooner Peter and Jane (United Kingdom).

== Unknown date ==
List of shipwrecks: Unknown date in October 1862
Ship	State	Description
Albertina	Belgium	The ship was lost either on the Fahludd Reef, in the Baltic Sea, or on Fehmarn, Duchy of Holstein. She was on a voyage from Saint Petersburg, Russia to Antwerp.
Alderman Thompson	United Kingdom	The barque was wrecked at Cardigan. Her crew were rescued. She was on a voyage from Quebec City, Province of Canada, British North America, to Cardigan.
Alleghanian	United States	American Civil War: Bound from Baltimore, Maryland, to London, United Kingdom, with a cargo of guano, the 1,120 or 1,400-ton full-rigged ship was boarded and set afire sometime between 28 and 30 October by the crews of three Confederate States Navy small boats while at anchor in the Chesapeake Bay near Gwynn's Island, 5 to 12 miles (8.0 to 19.3 km) off the mouth of Virginia′s Rappahannock River. After the Confederates fled, USS T. A. Wood and the gunboat USS Crusader (both United States Navy) extinguished the flames, but the Confederates returned and set another fire that destroyed the ship.
Alma	United Kingdom	The barque was driven ashore on Oyster Island, County Sligo.
Ann and Elizabeth	United Kingdom	The ship was abandoned before 28 October. She was on a voyage from Iceland to Barcelona, Spain.
Ann and Isabella	United Kingdom	The ship was wrecked at the mouth of the Chischa River, Russia before 11 October. Her crew survived.
A. Smithers	(United Kingdom of Great Britain and Ireland) British North America	The schooner was abandoned off Bermuda with the loss of two of her seven crew. Survivors were rescued by Pfeil (Bremen). A. Smithers was on a voyage from New York, United States to Santiago de Cuba, Cuba.
Blue Rock	United Kingdom	The ship foundered in the Pacific Ocean 200 nautical miles (370 km) south west of Iquique, Chile. Her crew were rescued.
Braes o'Murray	United Kingdom	The schooner was discovered derelict off the Farne Islands, Northumberland.
Cadboro	Flag unknown	The schooner was lost near Port Angeles, Washington Territory.
Cincinnatus	United States	The full-rigged ship was destroyed by fire in the Atlantic Ocean before 3 October. She was on a voyage from Newport, Monmouthshire, United Kingdom to Shanghai, China.
Comet	United Kingdom	American Civil War: The schooner was destroyed by USS Dacotah (United States Navy). She was on a voyage from Matanzas to Havana, Cuba.
Commerce	United Kingdom	The collier, a brig, foundered in the North Sea 30 nautical miles (56 km) off Spurn Point, Yorkshire. Her crew were rescued by a fishing lugger.
Conchita	Confederate States of America	American Civil War, Union blockade: The schooner was captured and burned off the coast of Louisiana or Texas near Calcasieu Pass and Sabine Pass.
Cybele	United Kingdom	The ship was wrecked near "Marberg". She was on a voyage from Riga, Russia to a Dutch port.
Corsair	United Kingdom	The ship foundered in the Baltic Sea before 25 October. She was on a voyage from Kronstadt, Russia to Hull, Yorkshire.
Dark Arnold	United Kingdom	The ship was wrecked in the Yangtze before 5 October. She was on a voyage from Liverpool, Lancashire to Shanghai, China.
Earl of Windsor	United Kingdom	The ship was wrecked at Port Albert, Victoria.
Eliza Jane	United Kingdom	The schooner was abandoned in the North Sea before 24 October.
Enigma	Flag unknown	The schooner ran aground on the Falsterbo Reef, in the Baltic Sea between 2 and 8 October. She was on a voyage from Danzig to Aberdovey, Merionethshire, Wales. She was refloated and put in to Copenhagen, Denmark in a waterlogged condition.
Era	United Kingdom	The steamship ran aground on the Fahludd Reef, in the Baltic Sea. She was on a voyage from Riga, Russia to Hull. She was refloated on 12 October and resumed her voyage.
Faden	Sweden	The schooner was abandoned in the North Sea. Her crew were rescued by Thistle (United Kingdom). Faden was on a voyage from Newcastle upon Tyne, Northumberland to Stockholm.
Fairy Queen	United Kingdom	The schooner was abandoned off Cape Finisterre, Spain. Her crew were rescued. She was on a voyage from Lowestoft, Suffolk to Marseille, Bouches-du-Rhône, France.
Fortschart	Grand Duchy of Mecklenburg-Schwerin	The ship foundered before 28 October. She was on a voyage from Wolgast to Leith, Lothian, Scotland.
Frederick	Rostock	The ship was lost near Farsund, Norway.
Garland	United Kingdom	The ship was abandoned in the Atlantic Ocean. She was on a voyage from Sombrero, Anguilla to Queenstown. She was driven ashore and severely damaged on the Mull of Kintyre, Argyllshire on 17 October. She became a wreck on 22 October.
General Hewitt	United Kingdom	The ship was abandoned at sea. She was on a voyage from Liverpool to Shanghai.
General Taylor	United States	The 462-ton screw steamer was stranded at Sleeping Bear Point on the Lake Michigan coast of Michigan.
George Robson	United Kingdom	The ship foundered in the North Sea off Sylt, Duchy of Holstein before 26 October with loss of life.
Go-a-head	United Kingdom	The ship was lost at "Curampe".
Gruber	Kingdom of Hanover	The ship was driven ashore on the west coast of Denmark. She was on a voyage from Papenburg to the River Tyne.
Hudson	United Kingdom	The brig was abandoned in the Atlantic Ocean before 20 October.
Jane Morell	United Kingdom	The ship was driven ashore near Domesnes, Russia.
Jasper	United Kingdom	The ship foundered before 29 October. She was on a voyage from Rostock to Dundee, Forfarshire.
Kate	United Kingdom	The ship was driven ashore at Maryport, Cumberland before 22 October.
Keepsake	United Kingdom	The ship was driven ashore at Maryport. She was refloated on 22 October and taken in to Maryport.
Laurel	United Kingdom	The ship ran aground on the Brouwers Reef. She was on a voyage from Shanghai, China to London. She was refloated and taken in to Batavia, Netherlands East Indies.
Llagothland	United Kingdom	The ship foundered in the North Sea. She was on a voyage from South Shields to London.
Mathew	United Kingdom	The brig was wrecked. Her crew were rescued.
Marion	United Kingdom	The ship was wrecked near "Larachaque", Nova Scotia, British North America before 8 October. She was on a voyage from Belfast, County Antrim to Miramichi, New Brunswick, British North America.
Mary Ann	Confederate States of America	American Civil War: The schooner was captured and burned on the Calcasieu River in Louisiana in early October by the steamer USS Kensington (United States Navy).
Meannais	France	The ship collided with another vessel and sank. She was on a voyage from Swansea, Glamorgan, Wales to La Rochelle, Charente-Inférieure.
Messenger	(United Kingdom of Great Britain and Ireland) Saint Lucia	The drogher was lost at Saint Lucia.
Meteor	United Kingdom	The ship foundered in the North Sea before 23 October.
Nana	United Kingdom	The ship foundered in the North Sea before 25 October. She was on a voyage from Sunderland, County Durham to Swinemünde, Prussia.
Neva	United Kingdom	The collier, a brig, foundered in the North Sea before 28 October. Her crew were rescued.
Pacific	United Kingdom	The ship departed from Hamburg in mid-October. Subsequently reported missing.
Perseverance	United Kingdom	The sloop was crushed by ice and sank in the Gulf of Saint Lawrence in late October with the loss of five of her six crew.
Prince of Wales	(United Kingdom of Great Britain and Ireland) New South Wales	The steamship was wrecked at Camden Haven.
Santa Maria	Flag unknown	The ship was wrecked on Læsø, Denmark.
Shepherd	United Kingdom	The collier, a brig, foundered in the North Sea before 28 October. She was on a voyage from South Shields, County Durham to Chatham, Kent.
Sofia B	United States of the Ionian Islands	The ship was wrecked at Sulina, Ottoman Empire.
Surinam	United Kingdom	The ship was wrecked in the Strait of Belle Isle before 15 October. She was on a voyage from the Clyde to Quebec City.
Sydney Jones	United Kingdom	The ship was driven ashore. She was on a voyage from Portmadoc, Caernarfonshire to Rostock. She was refloated and taken in to Helsingør, Denmark.
Telegraph	United Kingdom	The ship was wrecked at Sulina.
Token	United Kingdom	The brig was abandoned in the Atlantic Ocean before 26 February. Thirteen crew were rescued by Speculant (United Kingdom). Token was on a voyage from Belize City, British Honduras to Queenstown, County Cork.
Tom Cochrane	United States	The 14-ton screw steamer was stranded at Sturgeon Point on the Lake Huron coast of Michigan.
Whim	United Kingdom	The ship foundered in the North Sea. Her crew were rescued. She was on a voyage from Hamburg to Hartlepool, County Durham.
William Henry	United Kingdom	The schooner was run into by the full-rigged ship Reliance (United Kingdom) and was abandoned. Her crew were rescued by Reliance. William Henry was on a voyage from Boston, Massachusetts, United States to Liverpool. She had come ashore near Blackpool, Lancashire by 22 October.
Yarmouth	United Kingdom	The ship was wrecked near Varberg, Sweden.
