= List of shipwrecks in November 1862 =

The list of shipwrecks in November 1862 includes ships sunk, foundered, grounded, or otherwise lost during November 1862.

== 1 November ==
List of shipwrecks: 1 November 1862
Ship	State	Description
CSS A. B. Segar	Confederate States Navy	American Civil War, CSS Alabama's New England Expeditionary Raid: Pursued by a United States Navy flotilla, the gunboat, also referred to as CSS Segar, CSS Seger, and CSS Segur, was run aground by her crew and abandoned on the Atchafalaya River in Louisiana near Berwick Bay. She was captured and placed in service by Union forces.
Allen	United Kingdom	The schooner was driven ashore 12 nautical miles (22 km) west of Bergen, Norway. She was on a voyage from Trapani, Sicily, Kingdom of Italy to Bergen. She was refloated and towed in to Bergen.
Barbara and Margaret	United Kingdom	The ship sloop was driven ashore and wrecked on "Hastend Island". Her crew survived. She was on a voyage from "Carsthorn" to Liverpool, Lancashire.
Mary Rogerson	United Kingdom	The ship was abandoned in the Atlantic Ocean with the loss of a crew member. She was on a voyage from London to New York, United States.
Opal	United Kingdom	The schooner ran into the steamship Gaditana (Spain) and sank at Liverpool, Lancashire. Her crew were rescued. She was on a voyage from Glasgow, Renfrewshire to Liverpool. She was refloated on 21 November.
Pioneer	United Kingdom	The schooner was wrecked on the Swilly Rock, in Lough Swilly. She was on a voyage from Glasgow to Buncrana, County Donegal.

== 2 November ==
List of shipwrecks: 2 November 1862
Ship	State	Description
Enterprise	United Kingdom	The ship foundered in the North Sea. Her crew were rescued by Ellida (Norway).
James Dowell	United Kingdom	The schooner ran aground in the River Tay. She was on a voyage from Newcastle upon Tyne, Northumberland to Dundee, Forfarshire. She was refloated and taken in to Dundee in a severely leaky condition.
John and Richard	(United Kingdom of Great Britain and Ireland) Guernsey	The brig foundered in the Atlantic Ocean (12°29′N 56°00′W). Her crew survived. She was on a voyage from Demerara, British Guiana to Queenstown, County Cork.
Levi Starbuck	United States	American Civil War: The 376-ton whaler was captured and burned in the North Atlantic Ocean off Bermuda near 35°40′N 66°000′W by the screw sloop-of-war CSS Alabama (Confederate States Navy).
Pathfinder	United Kingdom	American Civil War, Union blockade: Pursued by the gunboat USS Penobscot (United States Navy) while attempting to run the Union blockade with a cargo of boots, shoes, cutlery, salt, olive oil, liquor, and other goods, the schooner ran aground at Shallotte Inlet on the coast of North Carolina, Confederate States of America. Her crew set her afire and abandoned ship. Men from Penobscot boarded her and extinguished the fire, but then burned her when they could not refloat her.

== 3 November ==
List of shipwrecks: 3 November 1862
Ship	State	Description
Jones	United Kingdom	The ship sank off Holyhead, Anglesey with the loss of all but one of her crew. The survivor was rescued by the Holyhead Lifeboat. Jones was on a voyage from Ayr to Liverpool, Lancashire.
Marie Mathilde	France	The schooner struck the Grand Vinotière Rock, off Le Conquet, Finistère and sank. Her crew were rescued. She was on a voyage from Cardiff, Glamorgan, United Kingdom to Nantes, Loire-Inférieure.

== 4 November ==
List of shipwrecks: 4 November 1862
Ship	State	Description
Braes of Moray	United Kingdom	The schooner was discovered abandoned 50 nautical miles (93 km) off Heligoland by the brig Friendship (United Kingdom). She was towed in to North Shields, Northumberland.
Corsair	United Kingdom	The ship was driven ashore at "Espskar". She was on a voyage from Kronstadt, Russia to Hull, Yorkshire.
Dorothea	Stettin	The brig ran ashore 2 nautical miles (3.7 km) north of Warkworth, Northumberland. She was on a voyage from Stettin to Sunderland, County Durham, United Kingdom. She was refloated with assistance from the paddle tugs Ellen Browne and Marco Polo (both United Kingdom). Marco Polo towed her in to Sunderland.
Margaret Dundas	United Kingdom	The barque ran aground in the Bosphorus near the Leander Tower. She was on a voyage from Taganrog, Russia to a British port. She was refloated the next day.
Melbourne	United Kingdom	The ship was wrecked on "Buffel's Hoek", Cape Colony.
Robert Wilbur	Confederate States of America	American Civil War, Union blockade: The schooner was captured and burned in Nomini Creek in Virginia off the Potomac River, by a boat crew in a launch from the armed sidewheel paddle steamer USS Jacob Bell (United States Navy).
Sophia	United Kingdom	American Civil War, Union blockade: While attempting to run the Union blockade with a cargo of rifled field artillery pieces, salt, soda ash, saltpeter, small arms, and ammunition, the 375-ton barque was forced aground 3 to 5 miles (4.8 to 8.0 km) west of Masonboro Inlet, North Carolina, Confederate States of America by the armed screw steamers USS Daylight and USS Mount Vernon (both United States Navy). Boarding parties from Daylight and Mount Vernon then burned her.
Unidentified schooner	Confederate States of America	American Civil War, Union blockade: The schooner was captured and burned in Nomini Creek by a boat crew in a launch from the armed sidewheel paddle steamer USS Jacob Bell (United States Navy).
Unidentified sloop	Confederate States of America	American Civil War, Union blockade: The sloop was captured and burned in Nomini Creek by a boat crew in a launch from the armed sidewheel paddle steamer USS Jacob Bell (United States Navy).

== 5 November ==
List of shipwrecks: 5 November 1862
Ship	State	Description
Bay State	United States	During a voyage from Oswego, New York, to Cleveland and Toledo, Ohio. with seven passengers and a crew of between nine and 11 aboard, the steam screw cargo liner broke up and sank in a storm in Lake Ontario west of Oswego. All on board perished. A lifeboat, wreckage, and cargo from the ship washed ashore at Fair Haven, New York.
HMS Flying Fish	Royal Navy	The Intrepid-class gunvessel ran aground in the Solent off Yarmouth, Isle of Wight. She was on a voyage from Ascension Island to Portsmouth, Hampshire. She was refloated and taken in to Portsmouth. It was decided not to repair her.
Unidentified schooner	Unknown	American Civil War, Union blockade: The schooner was run aground and destroyed on the coast of North Carolina, Confederate States of America off New Inlet by the armed screw steamers USS Daylight and USS Mount Vernon (both United States Navy).

== 6 November ==
List of shipwrecks: 6 November 1862
Ship	State	Description
Armistad	Spain	The barque was wrecked near Luzon, Spanish East Indies.
Christine	United Kingdom	The ship was wrecked near Veracruz Mexico.
Estrella	Spain	The brig was wrecked near Luzon.
Indelano	Spain	The brig was wrecked on Luzon in a typhoon.
Josephina	Spain	The ship was wrecked near Luzon.
Julia	United Kingdom	The ship was taken in to Gothenburg, Sweden in a derelict condition. She was on a voyage from Kronstadt, Russia to London.
Lurline	United Kingdom	The barque was wrecked in a hurricane at Veracruz with the loss of four of her crew.
Manuelita	Spain	The barque was wrecked near Luzon.
Margaret	United Kingdom	The barque was abandoned in the Atlantic Ocean. Her crew were rescued by Ostrawa (United Kingdom). Margaret was on a voyage from Quebec City, Province of Canada, British North America to Dartmouth, Devon.
Nabob	United States	The full-rigged ship was wrecked on the coast of Cagayan, Spanish East Indies with the loss of eighteen of the 32 people on board. She was on a voyage from Boston, Massachusetts to Shanghai, China.
Romeo	Austrian Empire	The brig was lost off Cape Carvuono, Portugal. She was on a voyage from Alexandria, Egypt to Queenstown, County Cork, United Kingdom.
San José	Spain	The brig was wrecked near Luzon.
Tudeland	Flag unknown	The ship was wrecked near Luzon.
Wright	United Kingdom	The brig was driven ashore at Corton, Suffolk. She was on a voyage from Whitby, Yorkshire to London. She was refloated the next day and resumed her voyage.

== 7 November ==
List of shipwrecks: 7 November 1862
Ship	State	Description
Arctic	United States	The ship was driven ashore at Halmer Hole. She was on a voyage from New York to Saint John's, Newfoundland, British North America.
Boston	United States	The ship was driven ashore and wrecked on Straitsmouth Island, Massachusetts. She was on a voyage from Cornwallis, Nova Scotia, British North America to New York.
Chieftain	United Kingdom	The brig was wrecked on the Bragen Reef, in the North Sea off the coast of Denmark. Her crew were rescued. She was on a voyage from Kronstadt, Russia to London.
City of Sydney	(United Kingdom of Great Britain and Ireland) New South Wales	The steamship was wrecked at Green Cape. All on board, more than 100 people, were rescued.
J. P. Smith	Confederate States of America	American Civil War, Union blockade: The steamer was hard aground in Bayou Cheval, Louisiana, when she was burned by the sidewheel paddle steamer USS Kinsman (United States Navy) and the steamer Seger (United States).
Lima	United Kingdom	The brig ran aground on the Gunfleet Sand, in the North Sea off the coast of Essex. She was on a voyage from Arkhangelsk, Russia to London. She was refloated and resumed her voyage.
Nemesis	United Kingdom	The ship struck a sunken rock off the "Isle of Hoche", France. She was on a voyage from Nantes, Loire-Inférieure to Gloucester. She consequently put in to Le Palais, Morbihan, France.
Osprey	Confederate States of America	American Civil War, Union blockade: The steamer was burned in Bayou Cheval by the sidewheel paddle steamer USS Kinsman (United States Navy) and the steamer Seger (United States).
Panama	United States	The schooner stranded on the Bar of Popponesset Creek at Popponesset, Massachusetts.
Usher	United Kingdom	The tug struck the wreck of No. 4 (United Kingdom) in the River Tyne and was holed.
Vale	United Kingdom	The ship ran aground and was severely damaged at Banff, Aberdeenshire. She was on a voyage from "Brery" to Banff.
Wind Rush	United Kingdom	The ship foundered off Gandra, Portugal with the loss of all but one of her crew. She was on a voyage from Swansea, Glamorgan to Valencia, Spain.
No. 4	United Kingdom	The lighter was run into by the steamship Pioneer) and sank in the River Tyne.
Unidentified schooner	Confederate States of America	American Civil War, Union blockade: The schooner was burned on the Little Ogeechee River in Georgia to prevent her capture by the approaching screw steamer USS Dawn and gunboat USS Wissahickon (both United States Navy).

== 8 November ==
List of shipwrecks: 8 November 1862
Ship	State	Description
Aberystwyth	United Kingdom	The steamship struck rocks off Beaumaris, Anglesey. She was on a voyage from Holyhead, Anglesey to Beaumaris and Liverpool, Lancashire. She was refloated and towed in to Liverpool.
Agamemnon	United Kingdom	The ship ran aground 8 nautical miles (15 km) off Corregidor, Spanish East Indies. She was refloated.
Estenburg	Hamburg	The ship was driven ashore at Dymchurch, Kent, United Kingdom. She was on a voyage from Hamburg to Rye, Sussex, United Kingdom. She was refloated on 20 November with the assistance of the Coast Guard and taken in to Rye.
Musquito	United Kingdom	The ship was driven ashore 4.3 nautical miles (8 km) west of Gravelines, Nord, France. Her crew survived. She was on a voyage from Bombay, India to Cardiff, Glamorgan.
Tamar	(United Kingdom of Great Britain and Ireland) Tasmania	The schooner, carrying 29 passengers and cargo including timber and building stone, went onto rocks at the entrance to Otago Harbour New Zealand while en route from Hobart to Port Chalmers, New Zealand. All passengers and crew survived, but the cargo was mostly lost.
Opal	United Kingdom	The ship collided with the steamship Xanthe (United Kingdom) and sank in the River Mersey. She was on a voyage from Glasgow, Renfrewshire to Liverpool, Lancashire.
Thomas B. Wales	United States	American Civil War, CSS Alabama's New England Expeditionary Raid: The 599-ton ship, carrying jute, linseed, and 1,704 bags of saltpeter, was captured and burned in the North Atlantic Ocean southeast of Bermuda at 29°15′N 57°57′W by the screw sloop-of-war CSS Alabama (Confederate States Navy).

== 9 November ==
List of shipwrecks: 9 November 1862
Ship	State	Description
Fyenoord	Netherlands	The steamship ran aground off Hellevoetsluis, Zeeland. She was refloated.
India	United Kingdom	The ship collided with another vessel. She was beached at Queenstown, County Cork with the assistance of the steamship Holyrood (United Kingdom). India was on a voyage from Newcastle upon Tyne, Northumberland to Rio de Janeiro, Brazil.
Juventus	United Kingdom	The ship foundered in the North Sea. Her crew were rescued by a Norwegian schooner. She was on a voyage from South Shields, County Durham to Hamburg.
Loftus	United Kingdom	The sloop was abandoned in Hell Bay, Cornwall. Her four crew were rescued by the Padstow Lifeboat Albert Edward (United Kingdom). Loftus was on a voyage from Plymouth, Devon to Padstow, Cornwall to Padstow, Cornwall. She subsequently drove ashore.
Louisa	United Kingdom	The full-rigged ship was wrecked on the Cannon Rock, in the Irish Sea. She was on a voyage from Safi, Morocco to Londonderry.

== 10 November ==
List of shipwrecks: 10 November 1862
Ship	State	Description
Dierzack	Danzig	The ship was driven ashore and wrecked on Bornholm, Denmark. Her crew were rescued. She was on a voyage from Danzig to an English port.
Satellite	United Kingdom	The ship foundered in the Mediterranean Sea (37°13′N 18°10′E). Her crew were rescued by the barque Minerva ( Austrian Empire). Satellite was on a voyage from Sulina, Ottoman Empire to Cork of Falmouth, Cornwall.
Theresa	United Kingdom	The ship was driven ashore and wrecked. Her crew were rescued. She was on a voyage from Maryport, Cumberland to Westport, County Mayo.

== 11 November ==
List of shipwrecks: 11 November 1862
Ship	State	Description
Dantzic	Danzig	The ship ran aground on the Sizewell Bank, in the North Sea off the coast of Suffolk, United Kingdom. She was on a voyage from Danzig to London, United Kingdom.
Mary	United Kingdom	The brig was driven ashore in Douglas Bay. She was on a voyage from Whitehaven, Cumberland to Cardiff, Glamorgan. She was refloated and taken in to Douglas, Isle of Man.
Rose	United Kingdom	The smack was run ashore at Rosscarberry, County Cork. She was on a voyage from Cork to Castletown, County Cork. She was refloated.
Stoer	Russia	The schooner was driven ashore near Slito, Sweden. She was on a voyage from Saint Petersburg to London.
Vesper	United Kingdom	The smack was run down and sunk in the North Sea by a Norwegian brig. Her crew were rescued.

== 12 November ==
List of shipwrecks: 12 November 1862
Ship	State	Description
Carl	Prussia	The schooner was driven ashore at Whitburn, County Durham, United Kingdom. She was on a voyage from Memel to South Shields, County Durham. She was refloated the next day with the assistance of two tugs and taken in to South Shields on 14 November.
Independent	United Kingdom	The ship ran aground and was wrecked near "Wyborg". Her crew were rescued. She was on a voyage from Kronstadt, Russia to London.

== 13 November ==
List of shipwrecks: 13 November 1862
Ship	State	Description
Ellen	United Kingdom	The brig was driven ashore at the mouth of the River Dee. She was refloated with assistance from the Kirkcudbright Lifeboat and taken in to Kirkcudbright.
Ida Hille Efchina	Netherlands	The ship was driven ashore on Goeree, Zeeland.
Indefatigable	United Kingdom	The ship was damaged by fire at Saint John, New Brunswick, British North America.
Solid	Sweden	The ship ran aground at Hartlepool, County Durham, United Kingdom. She was refloated and taken in to Hartlepool in a leaky condition.

== 14 November ==
List of shipwrecks: 14 November 1862
Ship	State	Description
Alarm	United Kingdom	The ship ran aground in the River Avon. She was on a voyage from Porto, Portugal to Bristol, Gloucestershire.
Archimede	Italy	The barque was driven ashore and wrecked at Agrigento, Sicily.
Bayard	France	The brig was driven ashore and wrecked at Agrigento.
Courier	Hamburg	The schooner was driven ashore at Cemaes Bay, Anglesey, United Kingdom. She was on a voyage from Liverpool, Lancashire, United Kingdom to the Gulf of Mexico.
Gio Batt Vico	Italy	The barque was driven ashore and wrecked at Agrigento.
Juliet	United Kingdom	The schooner ran aground on the West Hoyle Sandbank, in Liverpool Bay. She was refloated.
Legnano	Italy)	The ship was driven ashore in the Europa Channel. She had been refloated by 17 November.
Martha	United Kingdom	The brig was abandoned in the North Sea. Her crew were rescued. She was on a voyage from Newcastle upon Tyne, Northumberland, United Kingdom to Harlingen, Friesland.
Mary Elizabeth	United Kingdom	The smack was abandoned in Widemouth Bay. Her three crew were rescued by the Bude Lifeboat.
Ratcliffe	United Kingdom	The barque ran aground and sank at South Shields, County Durham. She was on a voyage from Quebec City, Province of Canada, British North America to South Shields.
Samolet	Russia	The schooner was driven ashore and wrecked on Anholt. Her crew survived. She was on a voyage from Newcastle upon Tyne to "Skaron", Grand Duchy of Finland.
Saxon	United Kingdom	The schooner was driven ashore and wrecked at Agrigento.
Victoria	Confederate States of America	American Civil War: Carrying a cargo of ammunition, the 487-bulk ton sidewheel paddle steamer was set afire and blown up in Atchafalaya Bay off Last Island, Louisiana.
Warbler	United Kingdom	The schooner was driven ashore and wrecked at Agrigento.

== 15 November ==
List of shipwrecks: 15 November 1862
Ship	State	Description
Bay State	United States	The steamship was wrecked off Oswego, New Brunswick, British North America with the loss of all on board.
Endeavour	United Kingdom	The schooner sprang a leak and sank 13 nautical miles (24 km) west north west of the Longships Lighthouse, Cornwall. Her crew survived. She was on a voyage from Neath, Glamorgan to Northam, Devon.
Mart	United Kingdom	The sloop ran aground on the Salthouse Bank, in the Irish Sea off the coast of Lancashire and was abandoned by her crew. She was on a voyage from Liverpool, Lancashire to "Ardiskay". Mart was refloated and towed in to a port by the Lytham Lifeboat.
Sarah	United Kingdom	The ship was wrecked on the Arklow Banks, in the Irish Sea off the coast of County Waterford.
Virginie Augustine	France	The ship was wrecked on the Goodwin Sands, Kent, United Kingdom. Her crew survived. She was on a voyage from Hull, Yorkshire, United Kingdom to Seville, Spain.
Unnamed	Norway	The barque ran aground on the Heaps Sandbank, in the North Sea off the coast of Essex, United Kingdom. All on board were rescued by the smack Beulah (United Kingdom).

== 16 November ==
List of shipwrecks: 16 November 1862
Ship	State	Description
Dreizak	Danzig	The ship was driven ashore and wrecked on Bornholm, Denmark. Her crew were rescued. She was on a voyage from Danzig to an English port.
Luck's All	United Kingdom	The ship ran aground on the Thief Sand, in the North Sea. She was on a voyage from Hull, Yorkshire to King's Lynn, Norfolk. She was refloated the next day and taken in to King's Lynn in a leaky condition.
Rainbow	United Kingdom	The ship ran aground on the Newcombe Sand, in the Bristol Channel. She was on a voyage from Quebec City, Province of Canada, British North America to Gloucester. She was refloated and beach in The Swash. On 24 November, she was towed to Sharpness, Gloucestershire.

== 17 November ==
List of shipwrecks: 17 November 1862
Ship	State	Description
Ann	United Kingdom	The ship was driven ashore at Lowestoft, Suffolk. She was on a voyage from Gainsborough, Lincolnshire to London. She was refloated on 27 November with the assistance of a tug and taken in to Lowestoft.
Courier	United Kingdom	The ship was wrecked at Holyhead, Anglesey. She was on a voyage from Liverpool, Lancashire to Matamoros.
Elizabeth Ellen	United Kingdom	The schooner ran aground on the Knahagen, in the Baltic Sea off Helsingborg, Sweden. She was on a voyage from Newcastle upon Tyne, Northumberland to Danzig.
F. W. Pindar, or J. W. Pindar	United Kingdom	American Civil War, Union blockade: Pursued by the gunboat USS Cambridge (United States Navy) while attempting to run the Union blockade with a cargo of salt, the schooner ran aground at Masonboro Inlet, North Carolina, Confederate States of America. A boat crew from Cambridge then burned F. W. Pindar. On its way back to Cambridge, the boat was swamped, and its crew was captured by Confederate forces.
Phoeix	United Kingdom	The ship departed from Horsens, Denmark for the Firth of Forth. No further trace, presumed foundered with the loss of all hands.
Unidentified brig	United Kingdom	American Civil War, Union blockade: Pursued by the armed screw steamer USS Daylight (United States Navy), the brig ran aground in fog on the coast of North Carolina near Fort Fisher.
Unidentified schooner	Confederate States of America	American Civil War, Union blockade: Pursued by the gunboats USS Kanawha and USS Kennebec (both United States Navy) while attempting to run the Union blockade, the schooner was run aground and destroyed by her crew near Mobile, Alabama.

== 18 November ==
List of shipwrecks: 18 November 1862
Ship	State	Description
Admiral Moorsom	United Kingdom	The paddle steamer collided with RMS Ulster (United Kingdom) off Holyhead, Anglesey and was severely damaged. She was towed in to Holyhead by RMS Ulster.
Ann Maria	United Kingdom	American Civil War, Union blockade: While attempting to run the Union blockade with a cargo of salt, flour, sugar, and lard, the schooner was forced aground near Masonboro Inlet, North Carolina, Confederate States of America by the screw steamer USS Monticello (United States Navy). She bilged, broke up, was set afire, and sank in 24 feet (7.3 meters) of water.
Ariel	United Kingdom	American Civil War, Union blockade: While attempting to run the Union blockade with a cargo of salt, flour, sugar, and lard, the schooner was forced aground near Masonboro Inlet by the screw steamer USS Monticello (United States Navy). The crew of Monticello burned her the next day.
Earl of Lisburn	United Kingdom	The schooner collided with the barque Margaret Edward United Kingdom)) and sank in the Atlantic Ocean 5 nautical miles (9.3 km) off the Godrevy Lighthouse, Cornwall. Her crew were rescued by Margaret Edward. Earl of Lisburn was on a voyage from Plymouth, Devon to Newport, Monmouthshire.
John	United Kingdom	The smack ran aground and was wrecked at Teignmouth, Devon with the loss of a crew member. Survivors were rescued by the Teignmouth Lifeboat.
Kate	Confederate States of America	The schooner struck a snag and sank on the Cape Fear River Bar off the coast of North Carolina.
Osprey	United Kingdom	The ship struck the Eagle Rock, off the coast of Ayrshire and sank. She was on a voyage from Whitehaven, Cumberland to Ardrossan, Ayrshire.

== 19 November ==
List of shipwrecks: 19 November 1862
Ship	State	Description
Harvey Birch	United States	American Civil War: The clipper was captured by CSS Nashville (Confederate States Navy and was burnt. Harvey Birch was on a voyage from New York to Havre de Grâce, Seine-Inférieure, France.
Homer	United Kingdom	The schooner ran aground in the Scheldt. She was on a voyage from Antwerp to the Rio Grande.
LaClede	United States	The 179-ton sternwheel paddle steamer was stranded on the Mississippi River at Chester, Illinois.
Sarah	United Kingdom	The ship was abandoned on the Grand Banks of Newfoundland. Her crew were rescued. She was on a voyage from Montreal, Province of Canada, British North America to Gloucester.
Thomas and Martha	United Kingdom	The schooner ran aground and sank in the Humber. Her crew were rescued by the Spurn Lifeboat. She was on a voyage from Seaham, County Durham to Great Yarmouth, Norfolk.
William Bateman	Prussia	The barque ran aground and sank in the River Liffey. She was on a voyage from Danzig to Dublin, United Kingdom. She was refloated the next day and taken in to Dublin.

== 20 November ==
List of shipwrecks: 20 November 1862
Ship	State	Description
Comet	United Kingdom	The sloop struck the Patterson Rock, off the coast of Argyllshire and was wrecked. She was on a voyage from Troon, Ayrshire to "Camloach".
Conqueror	United Kingdom	The ship collided with Safeguard (United Kingdom) and sank in the North Sea. Her crew were rescued. She was on a voyage from London to Hartlepool, County Durham.
Emma Tuttle	Unknown	American Civil War, Union blockade: Carrying a cargo of rosin, the schooner was captured and burned by the armed screw steamer USS Mount Vernon (United States Navy) off the coast of North Carolina, Confederate States of America 7 nautical miles (13 kilometres) southeast of Fort Fisher.
Hawk	United Kingdom	The steamship was driven ashore and wrecked north of Southwold, Suffolk. Her crew were rescued.
Jane Strong	United Kingdom	The barque was abandoned in a sinking condition in the Mediterranean Sea (36°32′N 18°48′E). Her crew were rescued by HMS Gannet (Royal Navy).
Mystery	United Kingdom	The steamship ran aground in the Newry Canal and was severely damaged. She was on a voyage from Warrenpoint, County Down to Ardrossan, Ayrshire.
Pearl	Unknown	American Civil War, Union blockade: Carrying a cargo of turpentine, rosin, and shingles, the schooner was leaking so badly while under tow by the gunboat USS Chocura (United States Navy) that she was set afire and abandoned. Chocura had captured her in the North Atlantic Ocean off the coast of North Carolina on 19 November at 33°38′N 078°19′W. The armed screw steamer USS Mount Vernon (United States Navy) later found Pearl adrift and took her in tow, but Pearl capsized and sank.
Regard	United Kingdom	The ship was wrecked on the Longsand, in the North Sea off the coast of Essex.
Seagull	United Kingdom	The schooner foundered in the North Sea. Her crew were rescued. She was on a voyage from Neath, Glamorgan to Rotterdam, South Holland, Netherlands.
Sir John Easthope	United Kingdom	The steamship depatred from Newport, Monmouthshire for Málaga, Spain. No further trace, presumed foundered with the loss of all hands.
Unnamed	United Kingdom	Four or five sailing barges were destroyed by fire at Blackfriars Bridge, London due to a fire in riverside warehouses spreading.

== 21 November ==
List of shipwrecks: 21 November 1862
Ship	State	Description
Atalante	Rostock	The brig was driven ashore near Stevens, Denmark. She was on a voyage from Danzig to an English port.
Augusta	Sweden	The ship was driven ashore on the east coast of Öland. She was on a voyage from Stockholm to Rönneburg, Hamburg.
Bravreen	Sweden	The steamship was driven ashore on the west coast of Öland.
Eva	United Kingdom	The barque foundered in the Mediterranean Sea (35°58′N 18°15′E). Her ten crew were rescued by the steamship Ceylon (United Kingdom). Eva was on a voyage from Taganrog, Russia to Falmouth, Cornwall and/or Plymouth, Devon.
Flora	United Kingdom	The ship was abandoned in the Atlantic Ocean. Her crew were rescued. She was on a voyage from Demerara, British Guiana to Liverpool, Lancashire.
Ingeborg	Sweden	The ship was driven ashore on the east coast of Öland. She was on a voyage from Stockholm to Hull, Yorkshire, Norfolk, United Kingdom.
Jeune Albert	France	The schooner was wrecked on the Haisborough Sands, in the North Sea off the coast of United Kingdom. Her crew were rescued by Alpha (United Kingdom). Jeune Albert was on a voyage from Sunderland, County Durham, United Kingdom to Caen, Calvados.
Nerve	Norway	The ship departed from Bergen for Messina, Sicily, Italy. No further trace, presumed foundered with the loss of all hands.
Richard, or Richmond	United Kingdom	The schooner was wrecked on the Holm of Houton, Orkney Islands. She was on a voyage from Arkhangelsk, Russia to the Clyde.
Wacousta	United Kingdom	The ship ran aground at Lake St. Peter, Province of Canada, British North America. She was on a voyage from Montreal, Province of Canada to London. She was refloated and towed in to Quebec City, Province of Canada.

== 22 November ==
List of shipwrecks: 22 November 1862
Ship	State	Description
RMS Avon	United Kingdom	The steamship was driven ashore and wrecked at Colón, Granadine Confederation.
USS Bainbridge	United States Navy	The brig of war was severely damaged at Colón. Her crew were rescued. Subsequently repaired and returned to service.
Boliva	United Kingdom	The brig was driven ashore and wrecked at Colón.
Cresswell	United Kingdom	The barque was wrecked on the Longsand, in the North Sea off the coast of Essex. Her crew were rescued. She was on a voyage from Sunderland, County Durham to Venice, Kingdom of Lombardy–Venetia.
Diligentia	United Kingdom	The full-rigged ship ran aground on the Broadstairs Knock, off the Kent coast. She was on a voyage from Sunderland, County Durham to Bussorah, Basra Vilayet. She was refloated and resumed her voyage.
Gleaner	United Kingdom	The smack was abandoned off "Table Land". She was on a voyage from Liverpool, Lancashire to Red Wharf Bay, Anglesey.
Ione D'Ajon	France	The full-rigged ship was lost at "Barbaro", Saint Domingo.
Josephine	France	The brigantine was wrecked on the Haisborough Sands, in the North Sea off the coast of Norfolk, United Kingdom. Her crew were rescued. She was on a voyage from Seaham, County Durham to La Rochelle, Charente-Inférieure. The wreck floated off the next day and came ashore at Sea Palling, Norfolk.
William	United Kingdom	The ship foundered off the mouth of the Saint John River, Africa with the loss of nineteen of her 21 crew.
xxxx	United Kingdom	The ship.

== 23 November ==
List of shipwrecks: 23 November 1862
Ship	State	Description
Brown Dick	United States	The 55-ton sternwheel paddle steamer was destroyed by fire while being dismantled at Wheeling, Virginia, Confederate States of America, drifting down the Ohio River after she caught fire.
Coupar	United Kingdom	The ship was driven ashore near Kristiansand, Norway. Her crew were rescued. She was on a voyage from Gothenburg, Sweden to Dundee, Forfarshire.
Else	Denmark	The brigantine was wrecked on Grand Cayman, Cayman Islands. Her crew survived. She was on a voyage from Liverpool, Lancashire, United Kingdom to Matamoros, Mexico.
Glen Grant	United Kingdom	The ship was driven ashore at South Shields, County Durham. She was refloated.
Peace	United Kingdom	The barque was driven ashore and wrecked near Gallipoli, Apulia. Her twelve crew survived. She was on a voyage from Taganrog, Russia to an English port
Pursuit	United Kingdom	The ship ran aground on the Sizewell Bank, in the North Sea off the coast of Suffolk and sank. Her crew were rescued by some pilot boats. She was on a voyage from North Shields, Northumberland to London.
Susannah	United Kingdom	The brig ran aground on the West Rocks, in the North Sea off the coast of Essex and was wrecked. Her crew were rescued. She was on a voyage from Sunderland, County Durham to London.
Unidentified schooner	Unknown	American Civil War, Union blockade: Carrying a cargo of cotton and turpentine, the schooner was burned by Confederate forces on the coast of North Carolina about 5 miles (8.0 km) from the mouth of New River Inlet when the gunboat USS Ellis (United States Navy) approached.

== 24 November ==
List of shipwrecks: 24 November 1862
Ship	State	Description
Amaranth	United Kingdom	The ship was wrecked at Cape Chat, Province of Canada, British North America. Her crew were rescued. She was on a voyage from Quebec City, Province of Canada to Cork.
Doris	(United Kingdom of Great Britain and Ireland) Gibraltar	The cutter yacht was driven ashore at Gibraltar.
Earl of Lisburne	United Kingdom	The ship collided with Margaret and sank in the Bristol Channel. She was on a voyage from Plymouth, Devon to Newport, Monmouthshire.
USS Ellis	United States Navy	American Civil War: The 100-ton sidewheel gunboat ran aground about 5 miles (8.0 km) up the New River Inlet at Jacksonville, North Carolina, Confederate States of America, and was holed by Confederate artillery fire. Her crew set her on fire on 25 November to prevent her capture by Confederate forces and abandoned her, and the explosion of her magazine when the flames reached it destroyed her.
Fortuna	Norway	The ship was wrecked at Cette, Hérault, France. She was on a voyage from Cette to Christiania.
Johanne	Netherlands	The schooner sprang a leak and foundered in the Mediterranean Sea (36°23′N 2°30′E). Her six crew were rescued by the schooner Notaris van Boekeren (Netherlands). Johanne was on a voyage from Livorno, Italy to Bristol, Gloucestershire, United Kingdom.
Malcolm Brown	United Kingdom	The schooner was driven ashore near Tarifa, Spain. She was refloated on 10 December and towed in to Gibraltar by the steamship Lion Belge (Belgium).
Mary Catherine	United Kingdom	The barque was driven ashore at Gibraltar. She was on a voyage from Fiume, Austrian Empire to Bordeaux, Gironde, France. She was consequently condemned.
Perle	France	The ship was wrecked at Cette with the loss of all hands. She was on a voyage from Newcastle upon Tyne, Northumberland, United Kingdom to Cette.
Sartelle	United States	The barque sprang a leak and foundered in the Atlantic Ocean. HAll on board were rescued by the brig P. Lacoste (United Kingdom).
Southerner	United Kingdom	The sloop was driven ashore on Luing, in the Slate Islands, Argyllshire. She was on a voyage from Peterhead, Aberdeenshire to Belfast, County Antrim. She was refloated and temporary repairs were made before she was taken in to Greenock, Renfrewshire, where she arrived on 23 December for permanent repairs.
St. Croix	(United Kingdom of Great Britain and Ireland) Jersey	The ship ran aground and was wrecked near East Burrow Head. Her crew were rescued. She was on a voyage from Guernsey, Channel Islands to London.

== 25 November ==
List of shipwrecks: 25 November 1862
Ship	State	Description
Alida Fokers	Netherlands	The koff ran aground on the Pye Sand, in the North Sea off the coast of Essex, United Kingdom. She was on a voyage from Groningen to London, United Kingdom. She was refloated and taken in to the Handford Water.
Bella Anita	Spain	The schooner foundered off Cape St. Vincent, Portugal. Her nine crew were rescued by the brig Sapphire ( Austrian Empire). Bella Anita was on a voyage from Valencia to Bilbao.
British Tar	United Kingdom	The ship sank at Barcelona, Spain. She was on a voyage from Newcastle upon Tyne, Northumberland to Barcelona.
Colibre	United Kingdom	The ship was driven ashore at Barcelona. She was on a voyage from Swansea, Glamorgan to Barcelona. She was refloated and found to be severely leaky.
Giovanni Stefano	Italy	The ship was wrecked at Sulina, Ottoman Empire. She was on a voyage from Izmail, Russia to an English port.
Kron Prinz Carl	Sweden	The ship was wrecked at Barcelona.
Magara	Spain	The ship was damaged at Barcelona.
Mary Ridley	United Kingdom	The ship was damaged at Barcelona. She was on a voyage from Newcastle upon Tyne to Barcelona.
Nordkyn	Norway	The ship was driven ashore on Spiekeroog, Kingdom of Hanover. Her crew were rescued. She was on a voyage from Hammerfest to Hamburg.
Prometheus	United Kingdom	The ship was damaged at Barcelona.
San Crestobal	Spain	The ship was wrecked at Barcelona with the loss of five of her seven crew.
Viedelust	Netherlands	The ship was damaged at Barcelona.
Wacousta	United Kingdom	The ship departed from Pill, Gloucestershire for London. No further trace, presumed foundered with the loss of all hands.
Unnamed gunboat	Confederate States of America	American Civil War: The incomplete gunboat was burned on the stocks on the North River in Virginia by an expedition from the armed sidewheel paddle steamer USS Mahaska and the armed tug USS General Putnam (both United States Navy).
Two unidentified schooners	Confederate States of America	American Civil War: The schooners were burned on the North River in Virginia by an expedition from the armed sidewheel paddle steamer USS Mahaska and the armed tug USS General Putnam (both United States Navy).

== 26 November ==
List of shipwrecks: 26 November 1862
Ship	State	Description
Allegrezza	Austrian Empire	The ship was wrecked at Marseille, Bouches-du-Rhône, France.
Electre	(United Kingdom of Great Britain and Ireland) New Zealand	The ship ran aground in the River Thames. She was refloated the next day and taken in to Gravesend, Kent.
Ellen	United Kingdom	The brig sprang a leak and was beached at Grimsby, Lincolnshire. She was on a voyage from South Shields, County Durham to Lisbon, Portugal.
Escolastica	Spain	The ship was wrecked at Marseille. She was on a voyage from Havana, Cuba to Marseille.
Finna Gerardina	Netherlands	The galiot sprang a leak and foundered in the Atlantic Ocean 32 nautical miles (59 km) east of Cape St. Vincent, Portugal. Her crew were rescued by the brig Lebanon (United Kingdom). Finna Gerardina was on a voyage from Livorno, Italy to London, United Kingdom.
Giovanni	Italy	The ship was wrecked at Marseille. She was on a voyage from Marseille to Barcelona, Spain.
Notre Dame de la Garde	France	The ship was wrecked at Marseille. She was on a voyage from Marseille to Gibraltar.
Panchisa	Spain	The ship was wrecked at Marseille. She was on a voyage from Havana to Marseille.
San Antonio Abbatti	Italy	The ship was wrecked at Marseille. She was on a voyage from Marseille to Civitavecchia, Papal States.
Triumphant	United Kingdom	The ship was driven ashore and wrecked 7 leagues (21 nautical miles (39 km)) south of Figueira da Foz, Portugal. Her crew were rescued. She was on a voyage from Liverpool, Lancashire to Civitavecchia.

== 27 November ==
List of shipwrecks: 27 November 1862
Ship	State	Description
Colombo	United Kingdom	The steamship was wrecked on Minicoy, Laccadive Islands. All on board were rescued. She was on a voyage from Calcutta, India to Suez, Egypt.
Defence	United Kingdom	The ship was driven ashore at Great Castle Head, Pembrokeshire. She was a total loss.
Eliza	United Kingdom	The barque was driven ashore in Lafres Bay, Portugal. She was on a voyage from Taganrog, Russia to Queenstown, County Cork.
Eliza Murray	United Kingdom	The ship was driven ashore at Kilcool, County Wicklow.
Henrietta Grieve	(United Kingdom of Great Britain and Ireland) British North America	The brig was driven ashore at "Beal". She was on a voyage from Limerick to Saint John's, Newfoundland.
Lone Star	United States	American Civil War: Carrying a cargo of sugar, the steamer was captured on the Mississippi River below Plaquemine, Louisiana, Confederate States of America by the Terrell Dragoons Mississippi Cavalry Regiment (Confederate States Army), then burned 10 miles (16 km) further downstream.
Margaret	United Kingdom	The schooner was driven ashore in Sturmford Bay. She was on a voyage from Troon, Ayrshire to Dundalk, County Louth.
Ripple	United Kingdom	The brigantine ran aground on the Salmedina Reef, in the Mediterranean Sea off the coast of Spain. She was on a voyage from Newcastle upon Tyne, Northumberland to Seville, Spain.
Rose	United Kingdom	The barque was driven ashore near Dungeness, Kent. She was on a voyage from Málaga, Spain to Sunderland, County Durham.
Senator	United Kingdom	The barque was abandoned in the Atlantic Ocean. Her crew were rescued by St. Michael (United Kingdom). Senator was on a voyage from New York to Cork.

== 28 November ==
List of shipwrecks: 28 November 1862
Ship	State	Description
Britannia	United Kingdom	The smack was driven ashore and wrecked at "Londonderry". She was on a voyage from Cardigan to Milford Haven, Pembrokeshire.
Cecilia	United Kingdom	The ship ran aground on the Manicouagan Shoals, in the Saint Lawrence River. She was on a voyage from Quebec City, Province of Canada, British North America to Waterford.
Chatham	United Kingdom	The ship ran aground in the Hooghly River. She was on a voyage from Calcutta, India to Mauritius. She was refloated and resumed her voyage.
General de Luders	Netherlands	The barque ran aground on the Goodwin Sands, Kent, United Kingdom. She was on a voyage from South Shields, County Durham, United Kingdom to Surabaya, Netherlands East Indies. She was refloated with assistance from the tug Triumph and two Deal boats and taken in to The Downs.
Harold	United Kingdom	The ship ran aground in Liverpool Bay. She was on a voyage from Calcutta to Liverpool, Lancashire.
Hulda	Prussia	The sloop sank off Pillau. She was refloated on 15 January 1863 and taken in to Pillau.
Kelpie	United Kingdom	American Civil War, Union blockade: The paddle steamer, a blockade runner, foundered 80 nautical miles (150 km) east of Nassau, Bahamas before 28 November. Her crew were rescued.
Rose	United Kingdom	The ship was driven ashore and wrecked at Dungeness, Kent. Her crew were rescued. She was on a voyage from Málaga, Spain to Sunderland, County Durham.
Samuel Boddington	United Kingdom	The ship sank off Newfoundland, British North America. Her crew survived. She was on a voyage from Montreal, Province of Canada to Liverpool.
Van Dyck	Belgium	The barque ran aground on the Barrow Flats, in the North Sea off the coast of Essex, United Kingdom. She was on a voyage from Ostend, West Flanders to Newcastle upon Tyne, Northumberland, United Kingdom. She was refloated and towed back to Ostend.

== 29 November ==
List of shipwrecks: 29 November 1862
Ship	State	Description
Betsey Hall	United Kingdom	The ship departed from Baltimore, Maryland, United States for Queenstown, County Cork. No further trace, presumed foundered with the loss of all hands.
Eliza	United Kingdom	The ship was driven ashore and severely damaged in the Bay of Luce. She was on a voyage from Liverpool, Lancashire to Loch Milford.
Mystery	(United Kingdom of Great Britain and Ireland) British North America	The ship was abandoned in the Atlantic Ocean. Her crew were rescued. She was on a voyage from New York, United States to San Juan del Norte, Nicaragua.

== 30 November ==
List of shipwrecks: 30 November 1862
Ship	State	Description
Happy Return	United Kingdom	The sloop sprang a leak and foundered 7 nautical miles (13 km) off Fraserburgh, Aberdeenshire. Her two crew were rescued by a pilot boat. She was on a voyage from South Shields, County Durham to Speymouth, Forfarshire.
Matchless	United Kingdom	The lugger collided with Cygnet (United Kingdom) and sank with the loss of a crew member.
Parker Cook	United States	American Civil War, CSS Alabama's Gulf of Mexico Expeditionary Raid: The 136-ton barque, carrying a cargo of pork, beef, butter, cheese, and bread to Aux Cayes Haiti, was captured and burned off Cape Rafael, Santo Domingo, by the screw sloop-of-war CSS Alabama (Confederate States Navy).
Princess Helena	United Kingdom	The ship was abandoned in the Atlantic Ocean. Her crew were rescued.
Unidentified flat-bottomed boat	United States	American Civil War, Union blockade: The flat-bottomed boat was destroyed at the head of Floods Creek in Virginia, Confederate States of America by the armed schooner USS Dan Smith (United States Navy).

== Unknown date ==
List of shipwrecks: Unknown date in November 1862
Ship	State	Description
Alpha	United Kingdom	The ship was wrecked on the Longsand, in the North Sea off the coast of Essex. Her crew were rescued. She was on a voyage from Newcastle upon Tyne, Northumberland to Plymouth, Devon.
Ana Teresa	Spain	The ship sprang a leak and foundered in the Atlantic Ocean (35°16′N 8°36′W). All 21 people on board took to a boat. They were rescued on 26 November by the brig Carolina (Italy). Ana Teresa was on a voyage from Cádiz to Havana, Cuba.
Ariel	United Kingdom	The ship was driven ashore in the Gut of Canso in late November. She was on a voyage from Charlottetown, Prince Edward Island, British North America to Liverpool, Lancashire. She was refloated and put back to Charlottetown, where she arrived on 8 December in a leaky condition.
Avon	United Kingdom	The ship was wrecked before 28 November.
Black Hawk	United States	Carrying a cargo of US$4,000 in specie and stained glass, the brig foundered in a gale in Lake Michigan off Point Betsie, Michigan, at 44°42′N 86°16′W.
Cléopâtre	French Navy	The frigate burned to the waterline without loss of life off Cape Hatteras, North Carolina, Confederate States of America.
Constantine	Flag unknown	The schooner was wrecked in Cuffey's Cove on the coast of California.
Earl of Derby	United Kingdom	The ship was abandoned off Tory Island, County Donegal in late November. She was subsequently towed in to Rutland Island, County Donegal by the steamship Lady Franklin (United Kingdom).
Earl of Selkirk	United Kingdom	The barque was abandoned in the Atlantic Ocean. She was on a voyage from Quebec City, Province of Canada to Shediac, New Brunswick, British North America. She foundered on 10 November.
Eugene	United States	American Civil War: The 298-ton sidewheel paddle steamer sank with the loss of 15 lives on either 1 or 14 November after striking the wreck of Eliza (flag unknown) in the Mississippi River at Plum Point, Tennessee, Confederate States of America.
Fenna Gerarda	Italy	The ship foundered off Cape St. Vincent, Portugal before 19 November. She was on a voyage from Livorno to London.
Flycatcher, or Fly Catcher	Confederate States of America	American Civil War: The steamship was sunk as a blockship in the Atchafalaya River or Bayou Teche in Louisiana.
Free Trader	United Kingdom	The ship was abandoned in the Atlantic Ocean before 19 November. Her crew were rescued. She was on a voyage from Quebec City to Penarth, Glamorgan.
Garland	United Kingdom	The ship was abandoned at sea. She was on a voyage from Sombrero, Anguilla to Liverpool.
Gutenberg	Flag unknown	The ship was wrecked at the mouth of the River Tay. She was on a voyage from Dundee, Forfarshire, United Kingdom to Kronstadt, Russia. Subsequently refloated and repaired.
Harry King	United Kingdom	The ship was driven ashore and wrecked at Dunwich, Suffolk.
Jane Francis	United Kingdom	The ship was driven ashore near Montevideo, Uruguay. She was refloated.
Jonquille	France	The ship was wrecked near Paimbœuf, Loire-Inférieure. She was on a voyage from Nantes, Loire-Inférieure to Gloucester, United Kingdom.
Margaret	United Kingdom	The ship was abandoned in the Atlantic Ocean. Her crew were rescued by Oshawa ( (United Kingdom of Great Britain and Ireland) British North America).
USS Mingo	United States Navy	American Civil War: The sternwheel paddle steamer sank in the Mississippi River off Cape Girardeau, Missouri, at 37°18′54″N 89°30′32″W.
Mio Zio	Flag unknown	The ship was lost near Tulcea, Ottoman Empire.
Morning Star	United Kingdom	The ship was destroyed by fire at Samana, Dominican Republic. She was on a voyage from Saint Domingo to New York.
Northern Light	United Kingdom	The barque sank at Port Burwell, Province of Canada. She was a total loss.
Omar Pasha	United Kingdom	The ship foundered before 7 November. Her 30 crew were rescued by Rising Sun (United States).
Ornen	Norway	The brig was driven ashore near Naples, Italy.
Radiant	United Kingdom	The ship was wrecked in the Bay of Fundy. Her crew were rescued. She was on a voyage from Dorchester, New Brunswick, British North America to Belfast, County Antrim.
Sea Breeze	United Kingdom	The schooner foundered off Kronstadt, Russia. She was on a voyage from Malta to Kronstadt, Russia, or from Kronstadt to London.
S. F. Blunt	Unknown	The schooner became waterlogged and sank at Albion, California. She later was salvaged.
Unidentified schooner	Confederate States of America	American Civil War: The schooner was loaded with bricks and scuttled as a blockship in Bayou Teche above the Cornays Bridge.
