= Granskär =

Coordinates: 63°7.3′N 21°28.5′E

Granskär (Swedish: Granskär, Finnish: Kuusisaari) is an island in the Kvarken ("The Throat"), the narrowest part of the Gulf of Bothnia in the northern part of the Baltic Sea. It has few inhabitants, almost all Swedish-speaking. Granskär belongs to the municipality of Vaasa.

The area has been inhabited since before the time of Swedish dominion over Finland; the first habitations can be traced to at least the 11th century and possibly earlier.

Granskär is part of a larger archipelago and most of the smaller islands around Replot have traditionally been used as fishing camps. Today the buildings are generally used as summer cottages since maritime activities play a large part in the culture of the region. Fishing is nowadays mostly a recreational activity, but there are still a number of professional fishermen active in the archipelago.

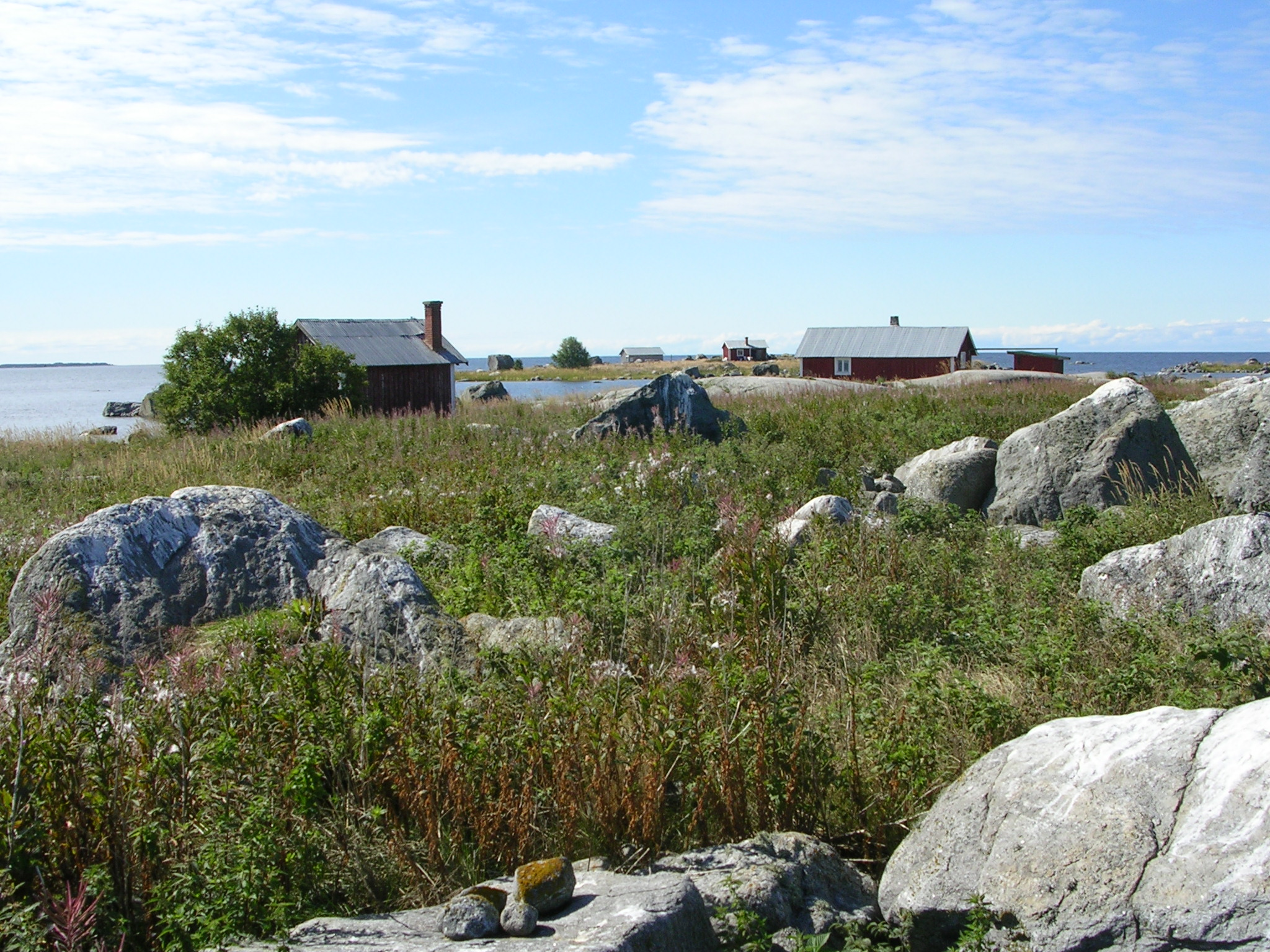
Typical summer cottages in the Kvarken archipelago.

A large part of the Kvarken archipelago has been designated a UNESCO World Heritage Site.
