= USS Daylight =

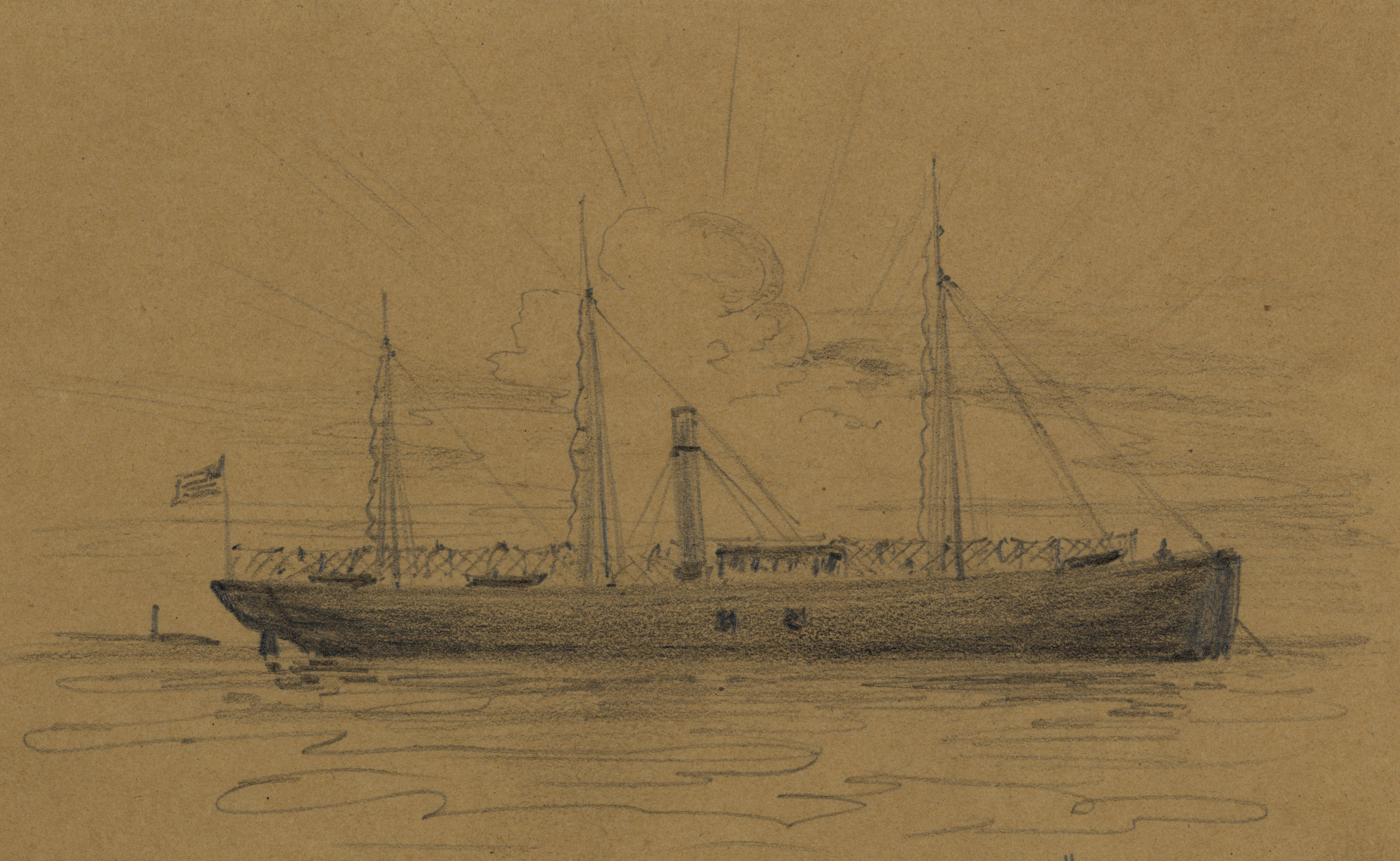
- Depiction of USS Daylight by Alfred Rudolph Waud, c. 1863

History

United States
- Name: Steamship Daylight
- Launched: 1859
- Acquired: 10 May 1861
- Commissioned: 7 June 1861
- Decommissioned: 24 May 1865
- Fate: Sold, 25 October 1865

General characteristics
- Displacement: 682 tons
- Length: 170 ft (52 m)
- Beam: 30 ft 6 in (9.30 m)
- Draft: 13 ft (4 m)
- Propulsion: steam engine; screw propeller
- Speed: 5 knots (9.3 km/h; 5.8 mph)
- Complement: 57
- Armament: 4 × 32-pounder guns

USS Daylight was a steamship acquired by the Union Navy during the American Civil War. She was used by the Navy to patrol navigable waterways of the Confederacy to prevent the South from trading with other countries.

== Service history ==
The screw steamer Daylight was built in 1859 by Samuel Sneden of New York City. She was chartered by the Navy 10 May 1861, purchased 12 October 1861, outfitted at the New York Navy Yard, and was commissioned 7 June 1861, Commander Samuel Lockwood in command. Daylight put to sea on 7 June 1861 for duty in the waters of Virginia and along the Atlantic coast as far south as Wilmington, North Carolina, where she assisted in the establishment of the Union blockade. She served as guard and picket ship and captured four vessels carrying contraband, recapturing one which attempted to escape, before arriving at Baltimore, Maryland, on 3 December for repairs.

On 26 January 1862, Daylight departed for Hampton Roads, cruising off the Virginia coast until 16 April when she sailed for Beaufort, North Carolina. She joined in the bombardment and capture of Fort Macon, North Carolina, on 25 and 26 April, receiving a damaging shot in her hull. She continued her duty, attacking Fort Fisher on 4 November 1862. During this attack she lost her second cutter and its crew. By the time she sailed for Baltimore and repairs on 30 April 1863, she had captured eight vessels. Repairs completed, Daylight sailed from Hampton Roads on 7 September 1863 to serve with the North Atlantic Blockading Squadron until 13 October 1864. Two days later she arrived at Fort Monroe and on the 22nd stood up the James River for guard and picket duty which continued until 6 May 1865. On 7 May, she put into Norfolk and five days later got underway for New York Navy Yard. She was placed out of commission there on 24 May 1865 and sold on 25 October of the same year.
