= CSS Alabama's New England expeditionary raid =

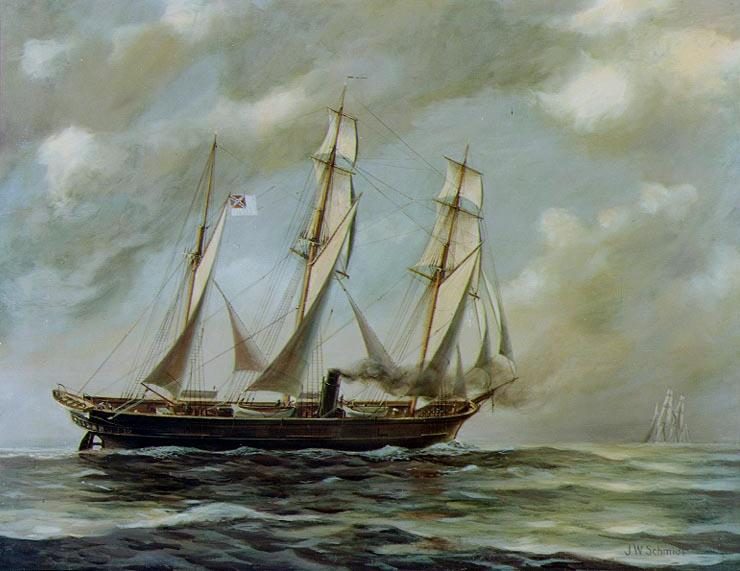
CSS Alabama

CSS Alabama's New England expeditionary raid commenced shortly after the Confederate States Navy ship CSS Alabama left the Azores and sailed west toward the northeastern seaboard of Newfoundland and New England. The primary area of operation during this expeditionary raid was the eastern seaboard of the United States as far down as Virginia and Bermuda.

== Raid overview ==
CSS Alabama worked its way down the east coast during the month of October capturing three ships and burning ten others. The Alabama encountered a hurricane on October 16th, causing them to depart the Grand Banks and sail south to warmer waters. Finally, departing its station off the New England coast, the Alabama set sail for Martinique to rendezvous with its supply vessel, CSS Agrippina, burning two more ships on the voyage.

Following an attempted blockade by Union vessels at Martinique, the Alabama made its way into the Caribbean Sea and the Gulf of Mexico to continue its harassment of Union commerce along the North American coastline.

== Raid bounty ==
CSS Alabama's New England Expeditionary Raid
Date	Ship name	Ship type	Location	Disposition of prize	Value
October 3, 1862	Emily Farnum	Merchant	Near New England	Released	
October 3, 1862	Brilliant	Merchant	Grand Banks of Newfoundland	Burned	$164,000
October 7, 1862	Bark Wave Crest	Merchant	Southeast of Nova Scotia	Burned	$44,000
October 7, 1862	Brig Dunkirk	Merchant	Southeast of Nova Scotia	Burned	$25,000
October 11, 1862	Tonawanda	Packet	Near New England	Bonded & Released	
October 11, 1862	Manchester	Merchant	Southeast of Nova Scotia	Burned	$164,000
October 15, 1862	Bark Lamplighter	Merchant	Off Nova Scotia coast	Burned	$117,600
October 21, 1862	Bark Lafayette	Merchant	South of Halifax	Burned	$100,337
October 26, 1862	Schooner Crenshaw	Merchant	Off New England coast	Burned	$33,869
October 28, 1862	Bark Lauraetta	Merchant	Near St. George's Bank	Burned	$32,880
October 29, 1862	Baron de Castine	Merchant	Near New York	Bonded & Released	
November 2, 1862	Levi Starbuck	Whaler	Off Virginia coast	Burned	$25,000
November 8, 1862	T. B. Wales	East India trader	Near Bermuda	Burned	$245,625
