= Edward Anderson =

Edward, Ed, or Eddie Anderson may refer to:

== Military officers ==
- Edward Anderson (general, born 1864) (1864–1937), American general from World War I
- Edward Clifford Anderson (1815–1883), American Civil War naval officer
- Edward D. Anderson (1868–1940), American general from World War I
- Edward L. Anderson, United States Navy officer
- Edward W. Anderson (1903–1979), American Air Force general from World War II

== Politicians and judges ==
- Edward Anderson (19th-century Texas politician) (1820–1896), state legislator in Texas affiliated with the Republican Party
- Edward Anderson (20th-century Texas politician) (1859–1923), state legislator in Texas affiliated with the Democratic Party
- Edward Anderson (Canadian politician), Canadian Liberal provincial politician from Ontario
- E. Riley Anderson (1932–2018), American politician and jurist from Tennessee

== Sportspeople ==
- Eddie Anderson (American football coach) (1900–1974), American college football player and coach
- Eddie Anderson (footballer) (born 1949), association football player with Clyde FC
- Eddie Anderson (safety) (born 1963), American football safety in the National Football League
- Edward Anderson (cyclist) (born 1998), American professional cyclist
- Edward Anderson (sport shooter) (1908–?), Belizean Olympic shooter
- Ted Anderson (footballer) (Edward Walton Anderson, 1911–1979), English footballer
- Ted Anderson (rugby league) (Edward Anderson, 1933–2012), Australian rugby league player

== Others ==
- Edward Anderson (chemist) (born 1975), English organic chemist
- Eddie "Rochester" Anderson (1905–1977), American comic actor who played the character Rochester on the Jack Benny program
- Edward Anderson (rapper) or Ed O.G. (born 1970), American hip-hop musician
- Edward Frederick Anderson (1932–2001), American botanist
- Edward H. Anderson (1858–1928), Swedish Mormon missionary
- Edward O. Anderson (1891–1977), American architect
- J. Edward Anderson (born 1927), American engineer and proponent of personal rapid transit

== See also ==
- Edmund Anderson (disambiguation)
- Edwin Anderson (disambiguation)
