= Ted Anderson =

Ted Anderson may refer to:

- Ted Anderson (footballer), English footballer
- Ted Anderson (rugby league), Australian rugby league player

== See also ==
- Ted Andersson, Swedish bandy player
- Edward Anderson (disambiguation)
