= Patient Porky =

1940 film by Robert Clampett

- Title card
- Directed by: Robert Clampett
- Story by: Warren Foster
- Produced by: Leon Schlesinger
- Starring: Mel Blanc] Ben Frommer
- Edited by: Treg Brown
- Music by: Carl W. Stalling
- Animation by: Norman McCabe
- Color process: Black-and-white
- Production company: Leon Schlesinger Productions
- Distributed by: Warner Bros. Pictures
- Release date: August 24, 1940
- Running time: 6 min
- Country: United States
- Language: English

Patient Porky is a 1940 American animated comedy short film directed by Bob Clampett. The short was released on August 24, 1940. It is part of the Looney Tunes series and the 77th cartoon to feature Porky Pig. A character later to be known as Bugs Bunny makes a cameo appearance in this cartoon, the final time his 1938 design is used.

== Plot ==
Porky visits a hospital with a stomach ache from overeating at his birthday party. Instead of a real doctor, he encounters a cat posing as "Dr. Chilled-Air". The cat attempts surgery on Porky, who panics and escapes. Back home, Porky tricks the cat into thinking it is Christmas, only to find himself stuck with the cat waiting to resume the operation.

== Voice Cast ==
- Mel Blanc as Porky Pig / The Rabbit / Black Elevator Operator (imitation of Eddie Anderson) / Olley Owl / Dog with Broken Leg / Herbie Hippo (snoring effects) / Cat / Program Seller
- Ben Frommer as Dr. Chris Chun
- Mary Shipp as The Receptionist (unconfirmed)
- The Rhythmettes as Singing Vocal Group

== Home media ==
- VHS 1994 – Porky Pig: Days of Swine and Roses (computer colorized) – Warner Home Video
- DVD 2007 – Looney Tunes Golden Collection: Volume 5 (restored, black and white) - Warner Home Video
- DVD 2017 – Porky Pig 101 (unrestored, black and white) - Warner Archive Collection

== See also ==
- Bugs Bunny filmography
- Porky Pig filmography
- Looney Tunes and Merrie Melodies filmography (1940–1949)
