= Daar kom die Alibama =

Song

"Daar kom die Alibama" (in English: "There comes the Alibama") is a traditional Afrikaans song and Cape jazz song. According to some sources, the song's history dates back to about 1863, and it originally referred to the warship, the CSS Alabama. The English name, Alabama, was respelt in the Cape Dutch vernacular to Alibama.

== Origin ==
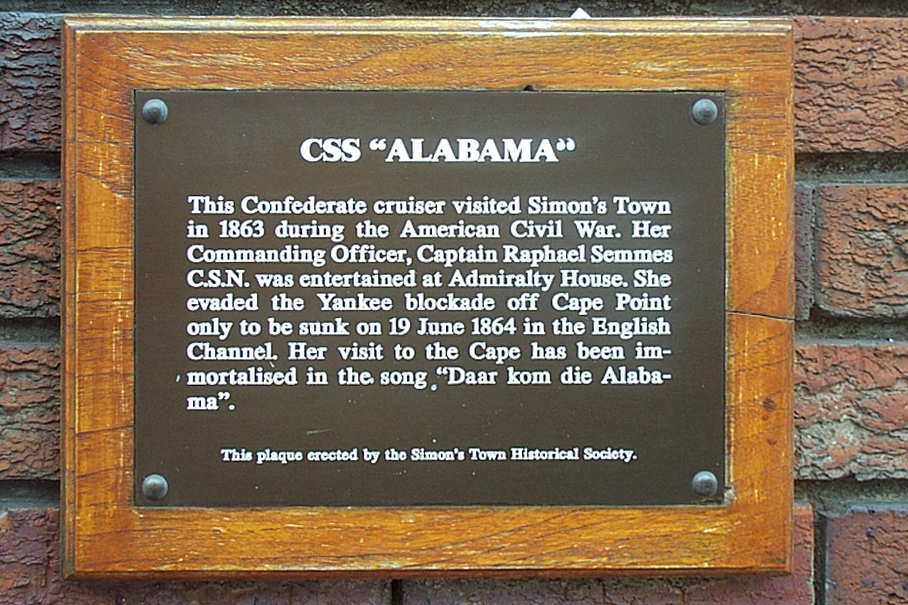
A plaque commemorating the visit of the CSS Alabama to Simonstown in 1863. It is commonly believed that the ship's visit to the Cape and its war time activities in the water surrounding it is the origin of the song.

=== CSS Alabama ===
In the American Civil War, the CSS Alabama sailed under the Confederate States of America flag and raided U.S. commercial shipping, successfully gaining international infamy. During a South African expeditionary raid in 1863, the ship docked at Cape Town to take on supplies and sell cargo and ships looted during its mission. Alabama revisited Cape Town in 1864. The song may have originated during these visits.

=== River boat ===
The South African journalist and author Lawrence G. Green states that the lyrics' reference to a "reed bed" possibly points to the song having a more humble origin. Green states that in the 1800s, there was a riverboat based on the Berg River, also named Alabama (Alibama), that once a year used to deliver reeds to the harbor of Cape Town. Weavers used the reeds to braid bridal beds for Cape Malay brides; at Cape Town harbor, they sang: "There comes the Alibama . . . the Alibama that comes across the sea ..."

== Lyrics ==
The lyrics in Afrikaans are:

Daar kom die Alibama, die Alibama kom oor die see

Daar kom die Alibama, die Alibama kom oor die see

Nooi, nooi, die rietkooi, nooi, die rietkooi is gemaak
Die rietkooi is vir jou gemaak om daarop te slaap
Nooi, nooi, die rietkooi, nooi, die rietkooi is gemaak,
Die rietkooi is vir jou gemaak om daarop te slaap

Die Alibama, die Alibama, die Alibama kom oor die see
Die Alibama, die Alibama, die Alibama kom oor die see

Daar kom die Alibama, die Alibama die kom oor die see
Daar kom die Alibama, die Alibama die kom oor die see

Die Alibama, die Alibama, die Alibama kom oor die see

Die Alibama, die Alibama, die Alibama kom oor die see

Translated into English, the lyrics are:

Here comes the Alibama, the Alibama comes across the sea

Here comes the Alibama, the Alibama comes across the sea

Girl, girl, the reed bed, girl, the reed bed has been made,
the reed bed has been made for you to sleep upon
Girl, girl, the reed bed, girl, the reed bed has been made,
the reed bed has been made for you to sleep upon

The Alibama, the Alibama, the Alibama comes across the sea
The Alibama, the Alibama, the Alibama comes across the sea

Here comes the Alibama, the Alibama that comes across the sea
Here comes the Alibama, the Alibama that comes across the sea

The Alibama, the Alibama, the Alibama comes across the sea

The Alibama, the Alibama, the Alibama comes across the sea

== See also ==
- Kaapse Klopse
