= CSS Alabama's South African expeditionary raid =

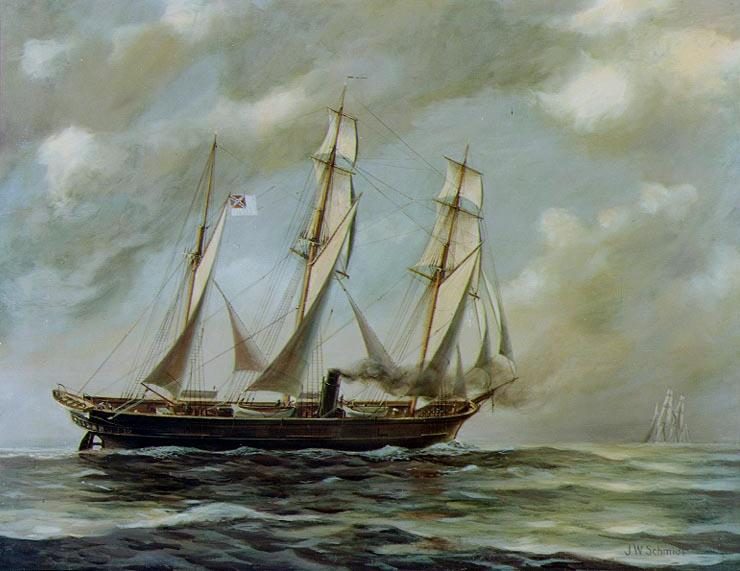

CSS Alabama's South African expeditionary raid commenced shortly after the Confederate States Navy sloop CSS Alabama left Brazil and the south Atlantic Ocean and patrolled southward of the African continent near the Cape of Good Hope. The raid lasted from about the beginning of August 1863 to the end of September 1863.

The primary area of operation during this expeditionary raid was off the southern seaboard of Africa ranging east and west hunting for China clippers having to make the voyage around the Cape of Good Hope near Cape Town.

== Raid overview ==
CSS Alabama worked its way slowly back and forth in the vicinity of Cape Town in one of the least successful of its seven raids, capturing a few U.S. barks. While operating in this area, the United States Navy's USS Vanderbilt put into Simon's Town in pursuit of Alabama, but had no luck in finding the evasive Confederate raider. Alabama rendezvoused a few times with its allied ship, CSS Tuscaloosa.

After this patrol station, Alabama sailed eastward into the Indian Ocean to continue its unhindered commercial raiding as far as Indonesia.

== Raid bounty ==
CSS Alabama's South African Expeditionary Raid
Date	Ship name	Tonnage	Ship type	Location	Disposition of prize
August 5, 1863	Sea Bride	447	Bark	Near Cape Town	Captured and sold
August 9, 1863	Martha Wenzell	?	Bark	Cape of Good Hope	Captured and released
