= Maffitt =

Maffitt is a surname. Notable people with the surname include:

- Edwin Maffitt Anderson (?-1923), Confederate veteran
- John Newland Maffitt (1795–1850), Irish-born American clergyman
- John Newland Maffitt (1819–1886), Confederate veteran
