= USS Vanderbilt =

Gunboat of the United States Navy

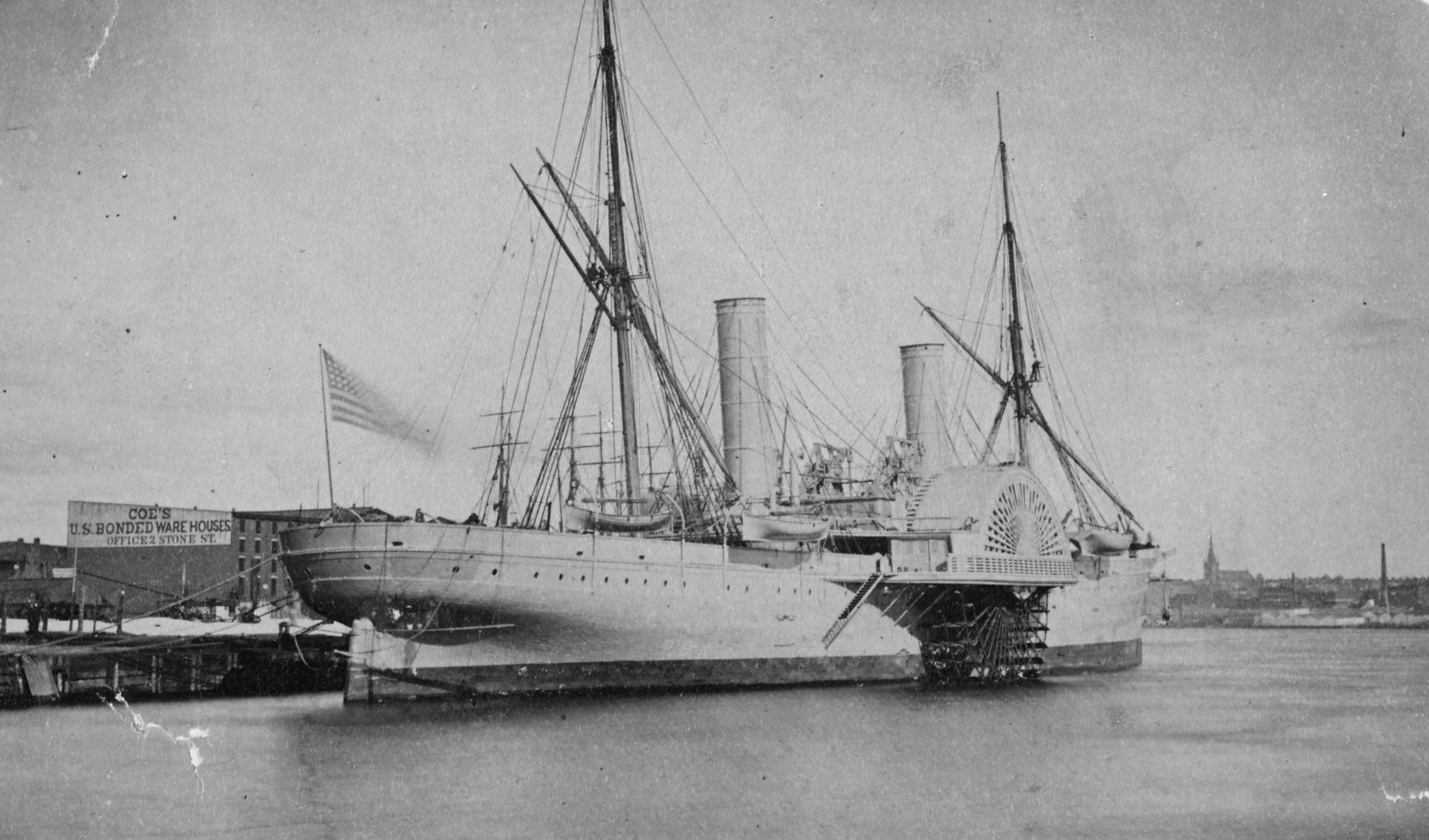
- USS Vanderbilt in port during the Civil War

History

United States
- Name: USS Vanderbilt
- Namesake: Cornelius Vanderbilt
- Builder: J. Simonson
- Cost: $800,000
- Laid down: 1856
- Launched: 1857 at Greenpoint, New York
- Acquired: 24 March 1862
- Commissioned: September 1862
- Decommissioned: 30 June 1866
- In service: 13 October 1866
- Out of service: 24 May 1867
- Stricken: 1873 (est.)
- Fate: Sold on 1 April 1873; Scrapped in 1899

General characteristics
- Displacement: 3,360 tons
- Length: 331 ft (101 m)
- Beam: 47 ft 6 in (14.48 m)
- Draught: 19 ft (5.8 m)
- Installed power: Twin vertical beam steam engines
- Propulsion: Sidewheel
- Speed: 14 knots
- Complement: unknown
- Armament: 2× 100-pounder Parrott rifles; 12× 9-inch Dahlgren smoothbores; 1× 12-pounder gun

USS Vanderbilt was a heavy (3,360-ton) passenger steamship obtained by the Union Navy during the second year of the American Civil War and utilized as a cruiser.

Vanderbilt—with her high speed of 14 knots—was outfitted with a large battery of heavy guns and sent out on the high seas in a futile search for commerce raiders of the Confederate States of America which were inflicting serious damage to Union commercial shipping. Later she served as part of the Union blockade of the Confederacy, and, post war, she had the honor of transporting the Queen of Hawaii from San Francisco, California, to Hawaii.

== Launched in New York in 1857 ==
Vanderbilt—originally a transatlantic passenger and mail steamer—was built by Jeremiah Simonson of Greenpoint, Long Island, New York, in 1856 and 1857. On 31 October 1858, the ship ran aground in the Weser while on a voyage from Bremen to Southampton, United Kingdom and New York. Vanderbilt was refloated and taken in to Southampton in a severely leaky condition. The ship was chartered by the Union Army shortly after the start of the Civil War in April 1861; offered to the Army by her owner, Commodore Cornelius Vanderbilt, in early 1862; and transferred to the Navy on 24 March.

Popularly known as "Vanderbilt's Yacht", the former flagship of Commodore Cornelius Vanderbilt's North Atlantic Mail Steamship Line began her military career in Hampton Roads, Virginia, intended for use as a ram against the Confederate ironclad CSS Virginia. Commodore Vanderbilt, himself, suggested filling the bow of the vessel with concrete and reinforcing it with iron plating.

== Civil War service ==
=== Searching for the CSS Alabama ===
This was not done, however, and Vanderbilt was turned over to the Union Navy on 24 March and fitted with a heavy battery of 15 guns at the New York Navy Yard during the summer of 1862. She left New York on 10 November and—after conducting a brief search for CSS Alabama, the most destructive Confederate commerce raider of the entire war—put into Hampton Roads, Virginia, on 17 January 1863.

Ten days later, Vanderbilt received orders to conduct a much longer and more thorough search for Alabama. This year-long cruise took the vessel to the West Indies, eastern coast of South America, Cape of Good Hope, St. Helena, Cape Verde, the Canary Islands, Spain and Portugal.

During the West Indies portion of her deployment, Vanderbilt served as flagship of Commodore Charles Wilkes' Flying Squadron. During the search, Vanderbilt captured the blockade-running British steamer Peterhoff on 25 February, off St. Thomas, Virgin Islands, causing a dispute between the British and Americans as to the disposition of mail carried aboard the steamer. President Abraham Lincoln eventually ordered the mail returned to the British.

Vanderbilt's captures also included the British blockade runner Gertrude, taken off Eleuthera Island in the Bahamas on 16 April, and the British bark Saxon, seized at Angra Peguena, Africa, on 30 October. Saxon was suspected of having rendezvoused with and taken cargo off CSS Tuscaloosa earlier. However, pursuing leads as to the whereabouts of Alabama, herself, became increasingly frustrating as Vanderbilt would often arrive at a port only to discover that her quarry had departed only a few hours earlier. She eventually returned to New York City in January 1864 for repairs without ever having sighted the Confederate vessel.

=== North Atlantic operations ===
Vanderbilt left New York City in September and cruised off Halifax, Nova Scotia, searching for blockade runners. The Halifax-Wilmington, North Carolina, route for blockade runners was used heavily at this time owing to outbreaks of yellow fever at Bermuda and Nassau, Bahamas. Nevertheless, the Union cruiser failed to take any prizes and put into Boston, Massachusetts, on 13 October.

She was deployed with the blockade off Wilmington in November and participated in the unsuccessful first amphibious assault upon Confederate Fort Fisher in the Cape Fear River, North Carolina, on 24 and 25 December. The Fleet took the fort during a second amphibious assault on 13 and 15 January 1865.

Vanderbilt returned to New York in late January, remaining until 24 March when she left for the Gulf of Mexico ferrying new recruits. From there, she proceeded to Charleston, South Carolina, towing the uncompleted Confederate ram Columbia from Charleston to Norfolk, Virginia, in May, and towed Onondaga from Norfolk to New York in June. Vanderbilt served as a receiving ship at the Portsmouth Naval Shipyard (Maine) during the summer of 1865.

== Post-war operations ==
=== Circumnavigating the Americas ===
The Civil War now over, Vanderbilt sailed from Portsmouth on 14 August and put into the Philadelphia Navy Yard on 27 August to be fitted put for a cruise around Cape Horn. She left Philadelphia, Pennsylvania, on 25 October and arrived in Hampton Roads three days later. There, she was designated flagship of a special squadron consisting of herself, Tuscarora, Powhatan, and Monadnock. The squadron was commanded by Commodore John Rodgers and intended to increase the Pacific Squadron to a 14-ship force.

The vessels left Hampton Roads on 2 November and arrived at San Francisco, California, on 21 June 1866 after stopping at most major South American ports while circumnavigating the South American continent.

=== Carrying Queen Emma to Hawaii ===
Vanderbilt was decommissioned at Mare Island, California, on 30 June, but was soon recommissioned and, on 13 October, sailed from San Francisco to Honolulu, Hawaii, with the Hawaiian monarch, Queen Emma of Hawaii, on board.

== Final decommissioning and subsequent career ==
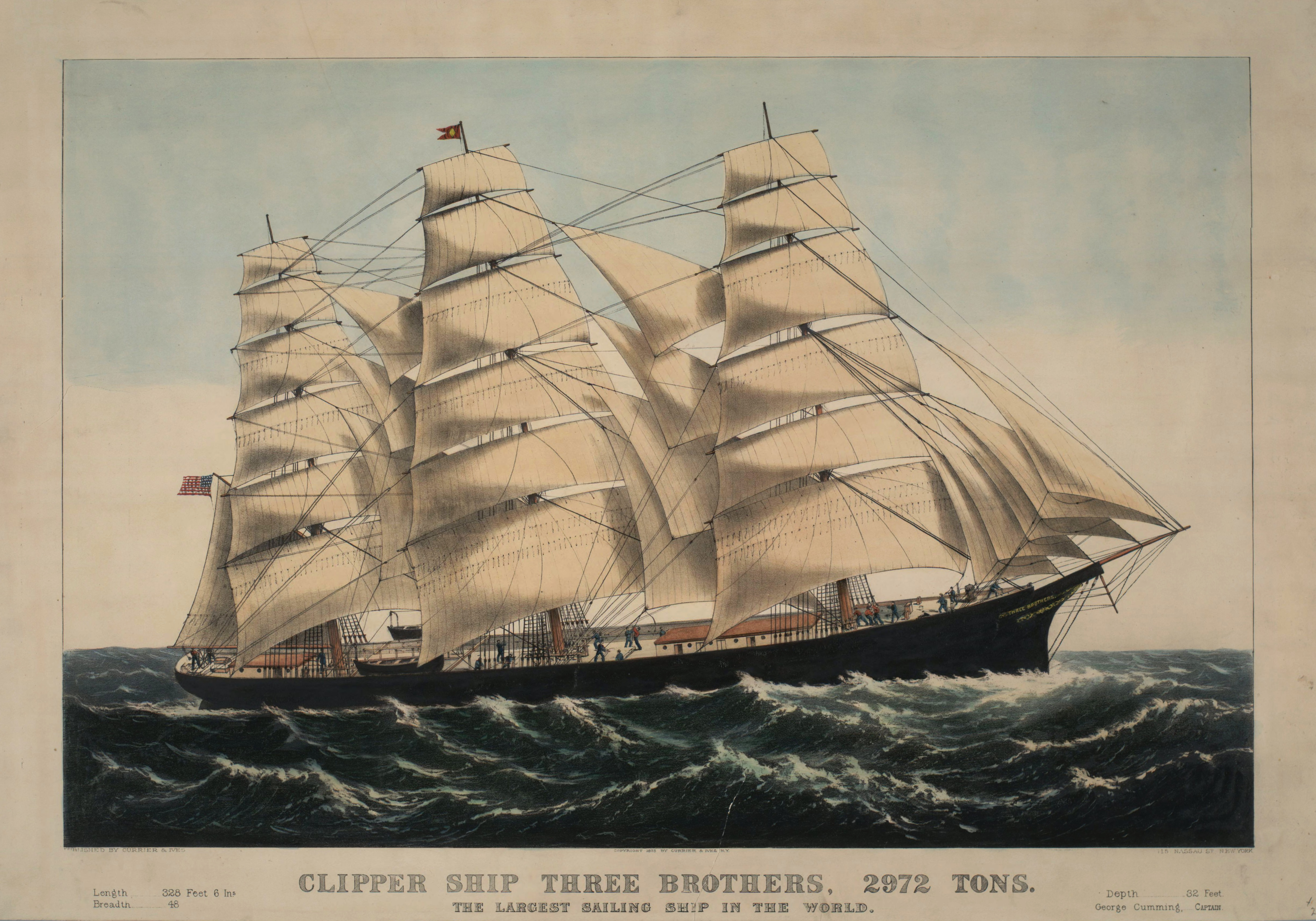
Three Brothers (Currier and Ives print, 1875)

The cruiser returned to San Francisco on 3 December and remained there at anchor until placed in ordinary at Mare Island on 24 May 1867. She lay there, in ordinary, until sold on 1 April 1873 to Howe & Company of San Francisco.

Her new owners removed her machinery, gave her a graceful clipper bow, and full rigging. Renamed Three Brothers, she spent most of her time in the grain trade between San Francisco, Le Havre, Liverpool, and New York City where she acquired an enviable reputation for speed and handling. "Vanderbilt's Yacht" served successive owners until 1899, at which time the vessel, now a coal hulk, was sold for scrap at Gibraltar.

== See also ==
- Confederate States Navy
- Union blockade

== Bibliography ==
- Sanger, George P. (Ed.) (1866): The Statutes at Large, Treaties, and Proclamations, of the United States of America, From December 1863, To December 1865, p. 401, Little, Brown and Company, Boston.
