= Edwin Anderson =

Edwin Anderson may refer to:

- Edwin Anderson Jr. (1860–1933), United States Navy officer
- Edwin Maffitt Anderson (1843–1923), Confederate naval officer
- Edwin Anderson (sport shooter) (1886–1943), American Olympic sport shooter
- Edwin H. Anderson (1861–1947), American library leader
- Edwin J. Anderson (1902–1987), American sports executive
