= Kaapse Klopse =

Annual festival in Cape Town, South Africa

The Kaapse Klopse (or simply Klopse), officially named the Cape Town Minstrel Carnival, is a traditionally Cape Coloured minstrel festival that takes place annually on 2 January in Cape Town, South Africa.

The festival is also referred to as Tweede Nuwe Jaar (Afrikaans for Second New Year). As many as 13,000 minstrels take to the streets, garbed in bright colours, carrying colourful umbrellas and playing an array of musical instruments. The minstrels are self-organised into klopse ("clubs" in Kaapse Afrikaans, but more accurately translated as troupes in English). The custom has been preserved since the mid-19th century.

Under apartheid, the period of government-enforced racial segregation and stratification in South Africa, the festival was known as the Coon Carnival, but local authorities have since renamed the festival the Cape Town Minstrel Carnival as the term coon is widely considered an ethnic slur.

There is contention around the continued use of blackface by festival performers.

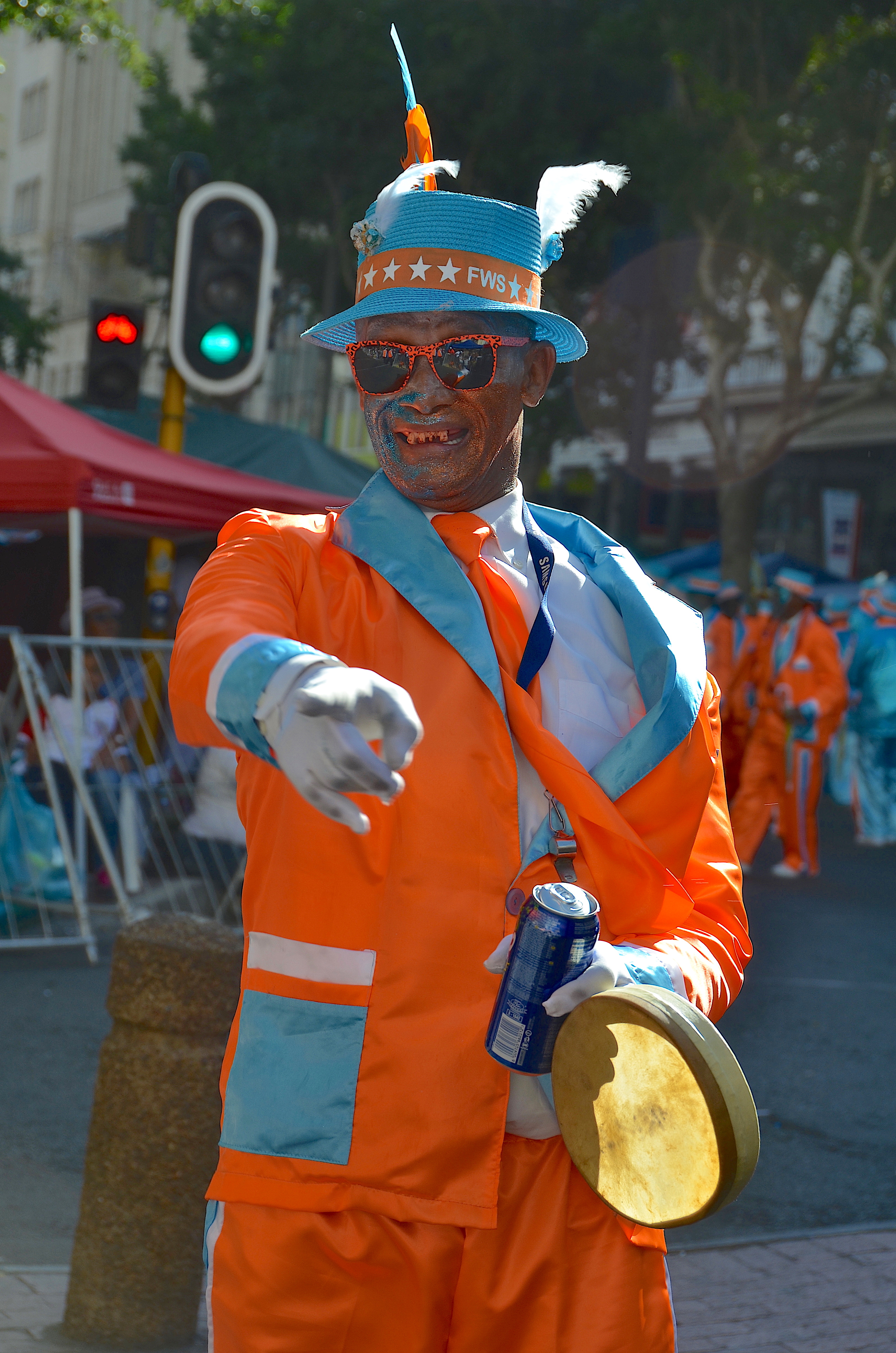
Cape Minstrel during Minstrel Carnival 2017

== History ==
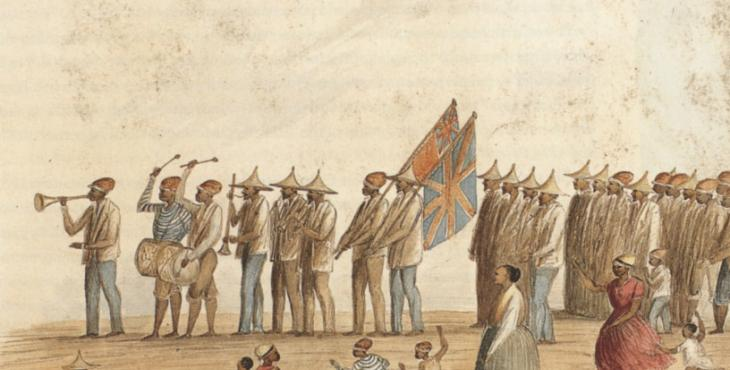
Cape Town procession on the anniversary of slave emancipation

On the eve of 30 December, people gather in the Bo-Kaap (Malay Quarter in Signal Hill) to await the Tweede Nuwe Jaar (2 January) with the songs of Malay choirs and ghoema drums ushering in the dawn of a New Year. During the 19th century, the New Year was celebrated by the Dutch and was considered to be the biggest annual feast. Slaves would get a day off on 2 January and were allowed to celebrate in their own manner. Slavery was officially abolished in the Cape on 1 December 1834. The Tweede Nuwe Jaar became a celebration that united the "creole culture" in Cape Town. It is estimated that the first carnival troupe was organised in 1887. In the apartheid years, the Cape Minstrels sang songs like "Dis'n nuwe jaar" ("It's a new year"), and many local songs, which were more true to the Cape Province and the local milieu.

Modern Cape Minstrel tradition was influenced by the visit to the Cape by American minstrels. Old Cape minstrels, such as "The Ethiopians", had their own collection of Dutch and American songs. These minstrels used to parade the streets of Cape Town and serenade the locals with their songs. An etching by Heinrich Egersdorfer in 1884 depicted those regular marches by the local chapter of the Salvation Army, which included many of the locals, could have contributed to the style of the marching that the Klopse displays today. In 1862, the then-internationally renowned Christy's Minstrels visited the Cape from the United States and in 1890 Orpheus McAdoo's Virginia Jubilee Singers performed in Cape Town. The Christy's Minstrels were white men and women who had blackened their faces with burnt cork to impersonate the African-American slaves. Between July 1890 and June 1898 they staged many minstrel shows in Cape Town and it is believed that this contributed to the birth of the Cape Minstrels and the Coon Carnival. The visitors' influence on the Coon Carnival included the tradition of painting their faces black and whited out their eyes to look like "racoons". In the 1900s, the celebrations took place at various locations. In 1907 Green Point Cricket Club organised the first formal Carnival and moved it to the Green Point Track which later became a tradition. The events continued in 1908 and 1909, but discontinued thereafter until 26 January 1920, when the leader of the African People Organization, Abdullah Abdurahman, re-instated the "Grand Carnival on Green Point Track". In 1921, the Cape Town Cricket Club held a rival carnival in Newlands and this was the start of minstrel competitions in various venues and by various organising boards. New Year Carnivals of the 1920s and 1930s brought Minstrels, Privates, Brass Bands, Choirs and Malay Choirs together.

=== Apartheid ===
The Group Areas Act of 1966 declared District Six a whites only area resulting in approximately 60 000 residents being evicted and moved to parts of the Cape Flats, such as Manenberg and Mitchells Plain. The implementation of the Group Areas Act resulted in communities losing their sense of belonging to the communities they grew up in because of the forced removals. The Minstrel performances were spread across the Cape Peninsula to various areas. In 1967, the Carnival was banned from its home at the Green Point stadium. In 1968 there were no Minstrels parading in the Cape Town CBD. Transportation to attend rehearsals became an additional challenge and expense for the different competing minstrel groups. During the 1970s, the traffic by laws and the "Illegal Gathering Act" were used to place additional challenges on the minstrel festival organizers. From 1971, Athlone Stadium was used for the 'non-white' spectators. In 1977, all Minstrel marches were forbidden in any part of Cape Town and as a result people lost interest in watching the parade. The event was moved between various stadiums in order to keep it alive until 1989, when the event returned to its original route: from District Six to the Green Point stadium.

== Tweede Nuwe Jaar ==
Tweede Nuwe Jaar ("Second New Year") is a day that is unique to Cape Town and stems from practices associated with slavery, and its history is linked with the Coon Carnival. In the mid-nineteenth century, the Cape slaves were given a day off from their duties on 2 January every year. During this alternative New Year celebration, the slaves would dress up as minstrels and dance rhythmically to the sounds of banjos, guitars, ghoema drums, whistles, trombones and tubas. Tweede Nuwe Jaar is a celebration of a community's survival. It illustrates the continuity between its past, present and future. The now deceased iconic musician Taliep Petersen, is claimed to have said of Tweede Nuwe Jaar celebrations, "Dis onse dag" ("It is our day"). It is a day when the local working class community which survived slavery, segregation and Apartheid celebrates its existence and perseverance.

== Troupe organisation ==
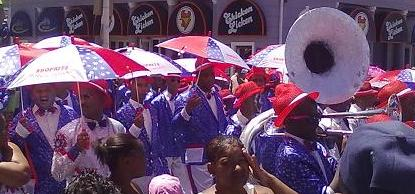
Troupe on Darling Street during the January 2011 festival

In 1880–1890, celebration bands and groups linked as societies with sports clubs with distinguishable emblems and dress paraded through the city and suburbs on New Year's Eve. These societies prepared special costumes for New Year's and these became a crucial part of the event. More than 60 minstrel troupes, some a thousand strong have been known to participate in the marches. Minstrel troupes are fiercely competitive and the preparations leading towards the parade, costumes and performances are kept as secrets until the big reveal on the day. They compete for trophies such as the "Champion of Champions award". This award has been won by the Pennsylvanians for 10 years in succession. The minstrel troupes give a sense of pride and community to the group members. The "ghoema" drum is the common thread that binds together all the music of the carnival. Until mid-1900s, competitions were organised by individual promoters. Boards appeared and disappeared – "Cape Peninsula Coon Carnival Board", "Western Province Jubilee Carnival Board" (Jimmy WG Allen), "Cape Western Coon Carnival Board" (directed by Sonny Loyd). The majority of the troupes are represented by the Kaapse Klopse Karnaval Association which is one of the break-away Associations from the Kaapse Karnaval ("Cape Carnival") Association. Today, the Cape Town Minstrels Carnival Association oversees the organisation of the Minstrel Carnival.

== Evolution of music ==
The music associated with minstrel history and Tweede Nuwe Jaar was influenced by a variety of sources. In the 17th and 18th centuries, slaves were sent to the Cape of Good Hope from Indonesia, Malaysia, Sri Lanka, India and East Africa (Madagascar), creating a melting pot of culture and influence. The British garrisons of the era influenced the marching processions of the minstrel troupes and a substantial collection of songs draw their origins from the Netherlands. The Cape slaves together with the local Khoisan population were known to sing in choirs as part of the celebrations. They also watched the colonial troops parade in Cape Town while singing "God Save the Queen". Traces of African, Asian and European music can be heard in the minstrel music. The ghoema beat reflects rhythmic similarities of India, Indonesia, Africa and the Middle East. Therefore, "Ghoemaliedjies" (Ghoema songs) are reminiscent of the music from Africa, Asia and Europe. "Melodies" and "moppies" have Western origins and were strongly influenced by African–American music (possibly associated with the exposure to the visiting American minstrels). The cinemas across District Six also exerted the jazz influence and the re-enactment of famous actors and singers in the performances. The evolution of the Cape slave "social fabric" included the development of their own music and dance which was used to grow social cohesion and celebrate whatever freedoms they were granted.

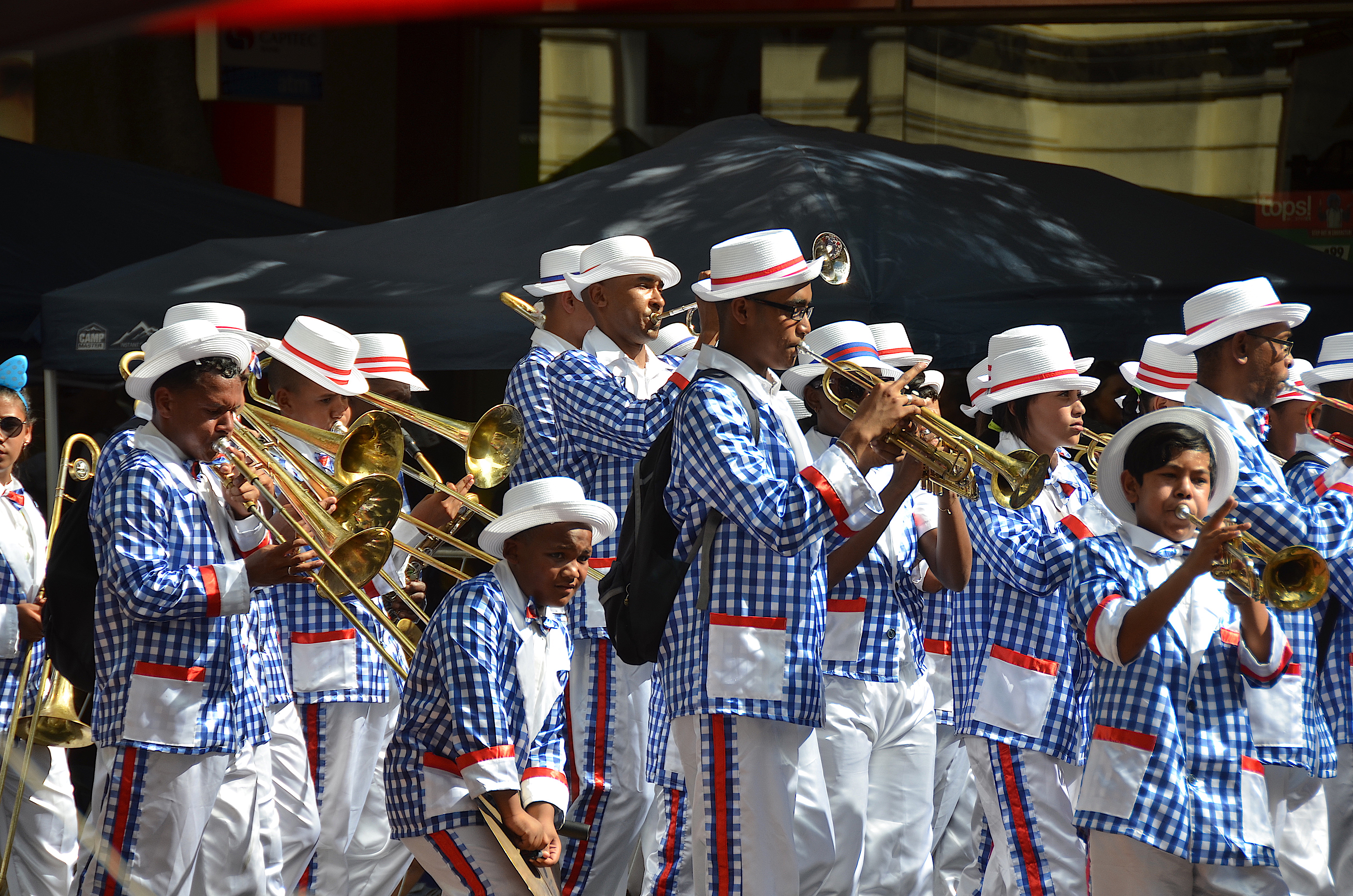
Troupe of minstrels marching through Cape Town (2017)

Well-known songs sung by minstrels:

- "Ek soek na my Dina" I am looking for my Dina
- "Kom dans Klaradyn" Come dance Klaradyn
- "Rosa"
- "Hier's ek weer" Here I am again
- Pollie, ons gaan Perel toe Pollie, we are going to Paarl
- "Vaarwel my eie soetlief" Farewell, my sweet
- "Die ossewa" The ox wagon
- "Bobbejaan klim die berg" Baboon climbs the mountain
- "Wat maak oom Kallie daar" What is uncle Kallie doing there
- "Hou djou rokkies bymekaar" Keep your dresses together
- "Solank as die rietjie" As long as the little reed
- "Daar kom die Alibama" There comes the Alabama

== Carnival today ==
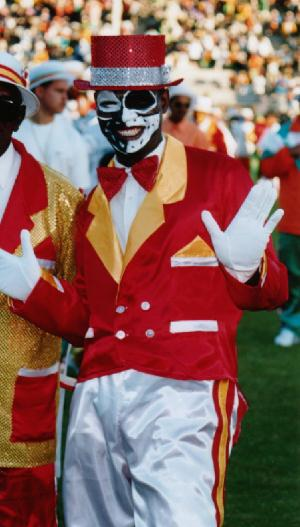
Minstrel in classic minstrel style struts his stuff at the Green Point Stadium in 2001

On New Year's Eve, the Cape Malay Choirs or "nagtroepe" march through Cape Town. Thereafter, the minstrels parade through the city and on Tweede Nuwe Jaar, 2 January, the troupes and choirs take to the Green Point Stadium. Present day, the competition starts on the afternoon of 1 January and continues on 2 January and the following two Saturdays.

Categories that are judged as part of the competitions include,

- Grand March Past – Quasi-military style parade
- Exhibition March Past – Display of fantasy and precise choreography
- Best Dress – Most beautiful uniform
- Best Board – Most imaginative and finest emblem
- Adult and Juvenile Drum Major – judged on quality of the dance
- English and Afrikaans Combined Chorus and Group Singing – songs performed by the troupe choirs, in part harmony
- English and Afrikaans moppies – comic songs sung by a soloist and the choir
- Juvenile and Adult Sentimentals – love songs interpreted by a soloist
- Best Band – determination of the best brass band accompany their troupe on the road and in the competitions
- Coon Song – An American tune or jazz standard sung by a soloist
- The Special Item – any form of performance, 20–30 minutes long, chosen by the troupe

The competition is judged by a panel of independent adjudicators and every group scores in each of the categories. The winners of the 2013 competition can be viewed on the Cape Town Minstrels Carnival Association.

While many troupes now are supported by corporate sponsors, many refuse and remain sticklers for tradition. The 2005 carnival was nearly cancelled due to an alleged lack of funding, while the 2006 carnival was officially called off for the same reason. However, the troupe organisations subsequently decided to go ahead with the parade despite continued unhappiness over funding, and the festivities were opened by Western Cape premier Ebrahim Rasool on 2 January 2006.

== Impact on societies ==
Modern celebration of Tweede Nuwe Jaar is a reminder of the slave past of colonial Cape Town, the importance of music and dance as part of the celebration of freedom. The klopse has played a significant role in addressing social challenges like crime, drug abuse, and AIDS. It is also used to build bridges between the communities after the apartheid era. Apart from providing entertainment, the Kaapse Klopse has also become a means of building skills in the community. The Kaapse Klopse and associated choir singing give the participating children the opportunity to learn the art of performing music and dance and exposed them to practising music three times a week in preparation for their performances. These activities paved the way for world-famous musicians like Taliep Petersen and Jonathan Butler who both received the "Juvenile Sentimental Trophy" awards in previous competitions. The skills extend beyond singing, dancing, playing musical instruments and sewing but also include skills associated with events management such as planning, project management and mobilising a diverse group of people, young and old. The singing and dancing has been proven a source of income and engendered a sense of pride in the communities where joblessness is a concern and frustration. During apartheid, children from previously disadvantaged communities were denied access to performance arts at school.

=== Criticism ===
Residents of the Bo-Kaap have complained about the noise and petty crime that accompanies the festival, and, in 2011, the City of Cape Town restricted parading in the Bo Kaap. Following protests by the minstrels, the Minstrels got permission to march in the Bo Kaap the following year.

== See also ==
- African music
- Minstrel show
- Mummers Parade, a minstrel-influenced New Year's parade in Philadelphia, Pennsylvania
- Second line, New Orleans, Louisiana
