= CSS Tuscaloosa (cruiser) =

Former cruiser ship

History

Confederate States
- Name: Tuscaloosa
- Commissioned: June 21, 1863
- Fate: Seized December 17, 1863

General characteristics
- Displacement: 350 tons
- Propulsion: Sail
- Complement: 15 officers and men
- Armament: 2 × 12 lb rifled brass guns

The CSS Tuscaloosa was a ship captured by the Confederate States Navy during the American Civil War, and was initially known as the American bark Conrad. While en route from Buenos Aires to New York with a cargo of wool and goat skins, she was captured by the CSS Alabama on June 20, 1863, during the CSS Alabama's South Atlantic Expeditionary Raid. Fast and well-adapted for a cruiser, Capt. Raphael Semmes, CSN, commissioned her the next day as a cruiser and tender to the Alabama, renaming her Tuscaloosa. Two rifled brass 12-pounders and a plentiful supply of rifles, pistols, and ammunition were transferred to her with enough provisions for a 3-month cruise. Lt. J. Low, CSN, with 15 men, was ordered on board with instructions for an African cruise in the direction of the Cape of Good Hope.

On July 31, 1863 Tuscaloosa captured the American ship Santee with a cargo of rice and bonded her for $150,000. On August 8, Low brought his ship into Simon's Bay in South Africa, departing thence for a 90-day cruise during which he stopped at Angra Pequena, Southwest Africa, to discharge Tuscaloosa's cargo of wool and goat skins. On November 19, 1863, he put into St. Catherine's, Brazil, for supplies but was not allowed to purchase them and was informed he must depart before nightfall.

From there, Tuscaloosa returned to Simon's Bay on December 26, 1863, only to be seized the next day by British authorities as an uncondemned prize which had violated the neutrality of Her Majesty's Government. They ordered her to be held until properly reclaimed by her original owners. Lieutenant Low and his men left the ship, and an officer and men from HMS Narcissus were placed on board. Her owners did not reclaim her, and in March 1864, she was released by the British authorities. The Confederate States Navy was in no position to reclaim her, and so after the war, she was turned over to the United States Navy.
