= Erich Schmidt (politician) =

German-born American politician (1831–1904)

Erich F. Schmidt was a German-born American politician.

Schmidt was a native of Braunschweig, born on 8 October 1831. He moved to Texas in 1866. Schmidt succeeded Edward Anderson in office on 22 March 1873, and represented the fourteenth district of the Texas House of Representatives until 18 April 1876. Schmidt served the remainder of his tenure in the state house for the thirty-third district, and stepped down on 14 January 1879. He died on 15 December 1904.
