= Edmund Anderson =

Edmund Anderson may refer to:

- Edmund Anderson (judge) (1530–1605), Elizabethan judge
- Edmund E. Anderson (1906–1989), industrial designer
- Sir Edmund Anderson, 1st Baronet (died 1630), of the Anderson baronets
- Sir Edmund Anderson, 3rd Baronet, of the Anderson baronets
- Sir Edmund Anderson, 4th Baronet, of the Anderson baronets
- Sir Edmund Anderson, 5th Baronet, of the Anderson baronets
- Sir Edmund Anderson, 7th Baronet, of the Anderson baronets

== See also ==
- Edward Anderson (disambiguation)
