= Edward Anderson (19th-century Texas politician) =

American politician from Texas

Texas House of Representatives
- In office January 14, 1873 – March 22, 1873
- Succeeded by: Erich Schmidt

Personal details
- Born: February 1, 1820
- Died: December 11, 1896 (aged 76)
- Party: Republican
- Profession: farmer

Edward Anderson (February 1, 1820 – December 11, 1896) a state legislator in Texas during the Reconstruction era. In 1866 he was elected councilman in the Texas House of Councils. He later served in the Texas House of Representatives for District 14 in 1873. Anderson was unseated later that year after testimony from fellow legislators.

A former slave, he was a farmer.
