= CSS Alabama's South Atlantic expeditionary raid =

Confederate navy overseas raids

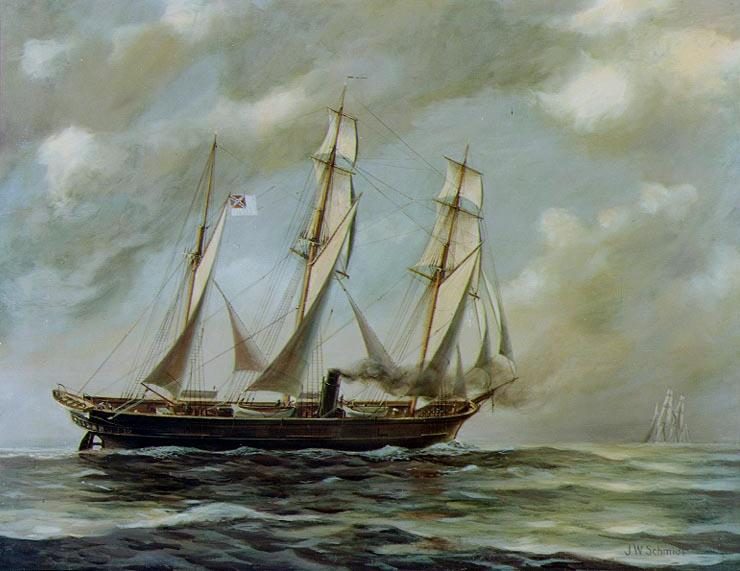
CSS Alabama

CSS Alabama's South Atlantic expeditionary raid commenced shortly after the Confederate States Navy ship CSS Alabama left Haiti and the Caribbean Sea and cruised south toward Brazil in the south Atlantic Ocean. The raid lasted from about the beginning of February 1863 to the end of July 1863.

The primary area of operation during this expeditionary raid, was the Atlantic seaboard of South America starting from the northern end of Brazil then ranging up down along the Brazilian coast before finally heading east toward southern Africa.

== Raid overview ==
CSS Alabama worked its way slowly down the east coast of Brazil in the most devastating of its seven raids, capturing or burning dozens of enemy Yankee vessels.

From this raiding area off the coast of Brazil, CSS Alabama made its way into the Indian Ocean by way of the Cape of Good Hope to continue its unhindered wrecking of enemy commerce in the Indian Ocean as far as Indonesia.

== Raid bounty ==
CSS Alabama's South Atlantic Expeditionary Raid
Date	Ship name	Ship type	Location	Disposition of prize
February 3, 1863	Palmetto	?	?	Burned
February 21, 1863	Olive Jane	?	mid-Atlantic	Burned
February 21, 1863	Golden Eagle	Extreme Clipper	mid-Atlantic	Burned
February 27, 1863	Washington	?	mid-Atlantic	Captured and released
March 1, 1863	Bethia Thayer	?	?	?
March 2, 1863	John A. Parks	?	?	Captured
March 15, 1863	Punjab	?	?	Captured
March 23, 1863	Charles Hill	?	?	Captured
March 23, 1863	Morning Star	Boston clipper	Near St. Paul	Captured and released
March 23, 1863	Nora	?	?	Captured
March 26, 1863	King Fisher	?	?	?
April 3, 1863	Louisa Hatch	?	?	Captured
April 15, 1863	Lafayette	?	?	Captured
April 15, 1863	Kate Cory	Schooner converted to Brig	?	Captured / Burned
April 16, 1863	Lafayette	?	?	?
April 22, 1863	Nye	Bark	?	Captured / Burned
April 23, 1863	Dorcas Prince	?	?	Captured
May 3, 1863	Union Jack	?	?	Captured
May 3, 1863	Sea Lareta	?	?	Captured
May 25, 1863	Gildersleeve	?	?	Captured
May 25, 1863	Justina	?	?	Captured
May 29, 1863	Jabez Snow	?	?	Captured
June 2, 1863	Amazonian	?	?	Burned
June 4, 1863	Azzapodi	?	?	Captured
June 4, 1863	Queen of Beauty	Clipper	Off Brazil	Captured and released
June 5, 1863	Talisman	medium Clipper	?	Burned
June 20, 1863	Conrad	Bark	coast of Brazil	commissioned as Tuscaloosa
July 1, 1863	Anna F. Schmidt	?	?	Burned
July 6, 1863	Express	?	Coast of Brazil	Burned
