= CSS Tuscaloosa =

CSS Tuscaloosa may refer to:

- CSS Tuscaloosa (cruiser)
- CSS Tuscaloosa (ironclad)
