= Edward Anderson (20th-century Texas politician) =

American politician (1859–1923)

Edward J. Anderson (23 October 1859 – 21 December 1923) was an American politician.

Anderson was born in Powhatan County, Virginia, on 23 October 1859. He later moved to Waxahachie, Texas, and represented District 39 in the Texas House of Representatives from 1909 to 1911 as a Democrat. Anderson died in Waxahachie on 21 December 1923.
