= Edwin Maffitt Anderson =

- Born: August 6, 1843; Savannah, Georgia, U.S.
- Died: January 28, 1923 (aged 79); Savannah, Georgia, U.S.
- Military career
- Allegiance: Confederate States of America
- Branch: Confederate States Navy
- Service years: 1861–1865
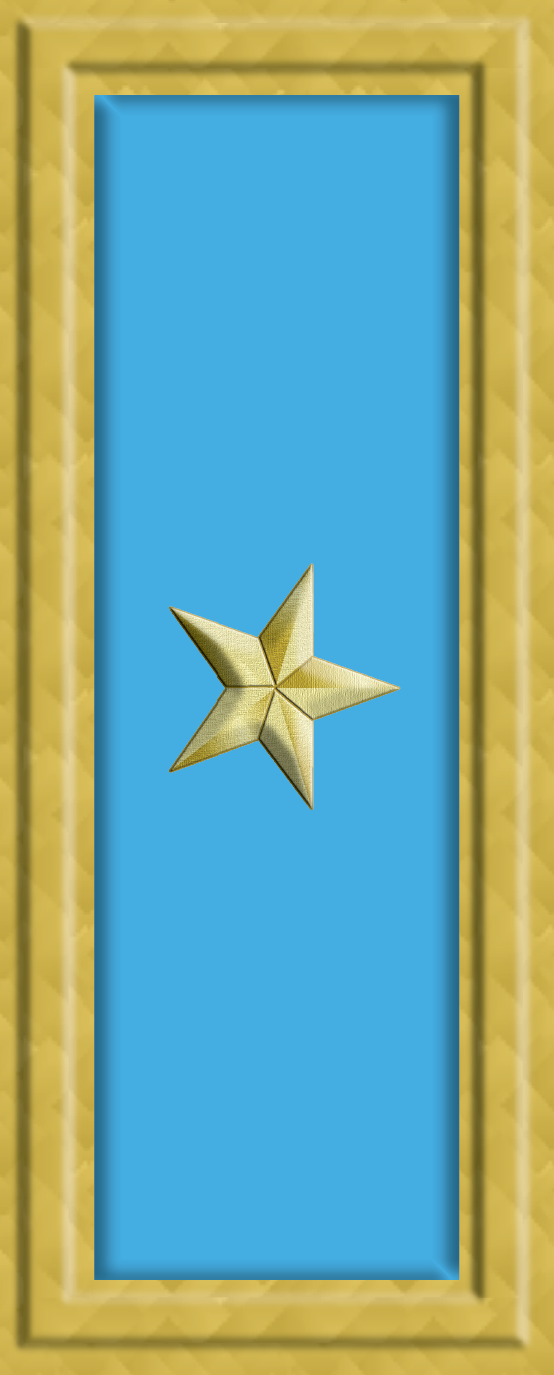
- Rank: Lieutenant
- Conflicts: American Civil War

Edwin Maffitt Anderson (August 6, 1843 – January 28, 1923) was a Confederate naval officer, serving on board the shipping raiders CSS Alabama and CSS Sumter as well as the master of the blockade runner CSS Owl during the American Civil War.

== Biography ==
Born in Savannah, Georgia, Anderson entered the Confederate Navy in October 1861, enlisting as a master's mate and being promoted within a month to midshipman. Briefly serving under Captain Raphael Semmes aboard the CSS Savannah, he was sent across the Atlantic and, in August 1862, joined the Alabama in the Azores just before its official commission and would remain aboard the commerce raider throughout its entire career. Wounded during the battle with the USS Kearsarge on June 19, 1864, in which the Alabama was sunk, Anderson was rescued by the Deerhound, a British yacht, and taken to England.

On his return to the Confederacy, he encountered the blockade runner CSS Owl and agreed to join its crew as an acting master and, by the end of the war, had won promotion to lieutenant. Anderson would later reside in his hometown Savannah, Georgia, where he lived until his death on January 28, 1923.
