= Ted Anderson (rugby league) =

Australian rugby league footballer

Personal information
- Full name: Edward Anderson
- Born: 22 May 1933 Newcastle, New South Wales, Australia
- Died: 28 March 2012 (aged 78)

Playing information
- Position: Second-row, Five-eighth, Centre
Club
Years	Team	Pld	T	G	FG	P
1938–46	Canterbury-Bankstown	77	15	14	0	73
Representative
Years	Team	Pld	T	G	FG	P
1938	New South Wales	2	1	0	0	3
1937	NSW Country	2	0	0	0	0
1938	NSW City	2	0	0	0	0
- Source: As of 16 April 2019

Ted Anderson was an Australian professional rugby league footballer who played in the 1930s and 1940s. He played for Canterbury-Bankstown in the New South Wales Rugby League (NSWRL) competition.

== Background ==
Anderson played his junior rugby league for Cessnock and played for New South Wales Country in 1937 before signing with Canterbury.

== Playing career ==
Anderson made his first grade debut for Canterbury against North Sydney in Round 1 1938 at North Sydney Oval. Canterbury would go on to claim their first minor premiership in 1938. Anderson would miss out on playing in the club's inaugural premiership victory over Eastern Suburbs due to injury. Anderson also represented New South Wales and New South Wales City in 1938.

In 1940, Canterbury reached their second grand final against Eastern Suburbs. Anderson played at five-eighth as Canterbury were defeated 24–14 at the Sydney Cricket Ground. The following season, Canterbury finished 2nd in 1941 and reached the final but were once again defeated by Easts 24–22.

In 1942, Anderson only made 1 appearance for Canterbury as he missed the entire season and the club's second premiership victory over St George. In the following 2 seasons, Canterbury went from winning the premiership in 1942 to running last in 1943 and 1944 claiming the wooden spoon. As of the 2019 season, no other club has gone from premiers to wooden spooners the next season with the exception of Melbourne who won the premiership in 2009 but were later stripped of the title for major breaches of the salary cap in 2010 and made to play for no points which resulted in the club coming last.

Later in his career, Anderson switched to the second-row and he retired at the end of 1946. In total, Anderson played 105 games for Canterbury across all grades. In 2004, he was nominated for the Berries to Bulldogs 70 Year Team of Champions.
