= List of shipwrecks in January 1863 =

The list of shipwrecks in January 1863 includes ships sunk, foundered, grounded, or otherwise lost during January 1863.

== 1 January ==
List of shipwrecks: 1 January 1863
Ship	State	Description
Carinen	Chile	The barque foundered in the Pacific Ocean. Her crew were rescued. She was on a voyage from Coquimbo to Lota.
CS Neptune (or CSS Neptune Camp)	Confederate States Army	American Civil War, Battle of Galveston: The armed cottonclad tug was sunk by United States Navy warships in Galveston Harbor off Galveston, Texas, when a shell passed through her hull. She suffered eight killed and 20 wounded, and three of the wounded later died of their injuries.
Noonday	United States	The clipper struck a rock off San Francisco, California and foundered. Her crew were rescued by the pilot boat Relief (United States). Noonday was on a voyage from Boston, Massachusetts to San Francisco.
Nova Scotian	United Kingdom	The ship was driven ashore at Colombo, Ceylon. Her crew were rescued.
Nymph	United Kingdom	The ship was wrecked near Saint-Valery-sur-Somme, Somme with the loss of all five crew.
USS Westfield	United States Navy	American Civil War, Battle of Galveston: The armed sidewheel paddle steamer, serving as flagship of the naval squadron blockading Galveston, ran aground on a sandbar in Galveston Harbor off Galveston, while in action with the gunboat CS Bayou City and the armed tugboat CS Neptune (both Confederate States Army). She was blown up to prevent her capture by Confederate forces, killing the fleet commander, Commander William B. Renshaw, and several members of her crew when the explosives detonated sooner than they expected.

== 2 January ==
List of shipwrecks: 2 January 1863
Ship	State	Description
Arnoldi	United Kingdom	The cutter ran aground on the Middle Sand, off the north Kent coast. She was refloated and towed in to Whitstable in a severely leaky condition.
Gratitude	United Kingdom	The brig ran aground on the Newcombe Sand, in the North Sea off the coast of Suffolk. She was refloated and resumed her voyage.
Joseph Howe	United Kingdom	The ship foundered off the Isles of Scilly. Her crew survived. She was on a voyage from Cardiff, Glamorgan to São Paulo da Assunção de Loanda, Portuguese West Africa.
Louisa	United Kingdom	The ship was driven ashore and wrecked at Braunton, Devon with the loss of one of her eight crew. Survivors were rescued by the Braunton Lifeboat. She was on a voyage from Appledore, Devon to Newport, Monmouthshire.
Marie Amelie	France	The ship was wrecked on the Longsand, in the North Sea off the coast of Essex, United Kingdom with the loss of three of her crew. Survivors were rescued by the smack Scout (United Kingdom). Marie Amelie was on a voyage from Grimsby, Lincolnshire, United Kingdom to Bordeaux, Gironde.
Ripple	United Kingdom	The schooner was driven ashore near Chipiona, Spain. She was on a voyage from Newcastle upon Tyne, Northumberland to Seville, Spain. She was refloated the next day and taken in to Seville, where she was condemned.

== 3 January ==
List of shipwrecks: 6 January 1863
Ship	State	Description
Dantsic	Danzig	The ship foundered in the North Sea. All five people on board were rescued. She was on a voyage from London, United Kingdom to Danzig.
Mexico	United Kingdom	The ship capsized at Cap-Haïtien, Haiti whilst being careened.
Neuha	United Kingdom	The ketch ran aground on the Abertay Bank, at the mouth of the River Tay and sank. Her crew were rescued by the Broughty Ferry and Buddonness Lifeboats. She was on a voyage from North Shields, Northumberland to Dundee, Forfarshire.
Time and Truth	(United Kingdom of Great Britain and Ireland) Victoria (Australia)	The barque carrying 2,600 sheep, was approaching Bluff, New Zealand from Melbourne when a heavy gale sprang up. The captain attempted to take the ship into Bluff Harbour, but it was struck by a swell and pushed into rocks off Stirling Point. The steamer Aphrasis succeeding in rescuing the crew and about 500 sheep before the Time and Truth went under. While returning to Bluff, the Aphrasis herself was involved in a collision with the steamer Prince Alfred and was heavily damaged.

== 4 January ==
List of shipwrecks: 4 January 1863
Ship	State	Description
Lady Mary Stewart	United Kingdom	The ship struck the Garrick Rock, in the Irish Sea. She was on a voyage from Runcorn, Cheshire to Newcastle upon Tyne, Northumberland. She put in to Port St. Mary, Isle of Man in a leaky condition.
Pax	Hamburg	The schooner was driven ashore near "Kjaergaard", Denmark. Her crew were rescued. She was on a voyage from Rostock to Newcastle upon Tyne, Northumberland, United Kingdom.

== 5 January ==
List of shipwrecks: 5 January 1863
Ship	State	Description
African	United Kingdom	The ship was driven ashore in Champion Bay. She was on a voyage from Sydney, New South Wales to London. She was consequently condemned.
Iceni	United Kingdom	The brig was destroyed by fire in the Atlantic Ocean. Her crew were rescued by the barque Fortitude (United Kingdom). Iceni was on a voyage from Pernambuco, Brazil to Liverpool, Lancashire.
Prosperity	United Kingdom	The sloop ran aground on the Longsand, in the North Sea off the coast of Essex. She was on a voyage from Dunkirk, Nord to London. She was refloated and assisted in to Harwich, Essed.

== 6 January ==
List of shipwrecks: 6 January 1863
Ship	State	Description
Balmoral	United Kingdom	The ship ran aground off Whiteforeland Point, Renfrewshire. She was on a voyage from Glasgow, Renfrewshire to the West Indies. She was refloated and towed back to Glasgow.
Batallion	United Kingdom	The steamship was driven ashore at Sunderland, County Durham. She was on a voyage from Bordeaux, Gironde to Sunderland. She was refloated and taken in to port.
Copia	United Kingdom	The barque departed from Demerara, British Guiana for Greenock, Renfrewshire. No further trace, presumed foundered with the loss of all hands.
Esteburg	Hamburg	The ship was driven ashore at Eyemouth, Berwickshire, United Kingdom. She was on a voyage from Rye, Sussex to Newcastle upon Tyne, Northumberland, United Kingdom. She was refloated and taken in to Eyemouth in a severely damaged condition.
Jacob Musselman	United States	American Civil War: The 144-ton sternwheel transport was captured by troops of the Arkansas Cavalry Company (Confederate States Army) on the Mississippi River opposite Memphis, Tennessee, Confederate States of America. The Confederate States Army took her 15 miles (24 km) upstream to Bradley's Landing, Arkansas, where they removed her cargo and burned her.
Sally	United Kingdom	The schooner ran around and was wrecked at Bilbao, Spain. Her crew were rescued. She was on a voyage from Sunderland, County Durham to Bilbao.
Unidentified flatboat	Unknown	American Civil War: The flatboat was burned by Confederate States Army forces at Bradley's Landing.

== 7 January ==
List of shipwrecks: 7 January 1863
Ship	State	Description
Countess of Winton	United Kingdom	The barque was destroyed by fire at Valparaíso, Chile.
La Plata, and Liverpool	United Kingdom	The barque La Plata and the steamship Liverpool collided off Point Lynas, Anglesey. Both vessels sank. La Plata was on a voyage from Liverpool, Lancashire to Lima, Peru. Her crew reached Holyhead, Anglesey in their boats. Liverpool was on a voyage from London to Liverpool. Her crew were rescued by the steamship Athlete and the tug Cruiser (both United Kingdom).
Little Magruder	Confederate States of America	American Civil War: The steamer was destroyed on the Pamunkey River at White House, Virginia, by an expedition consisting of the armed sidewheel paddle steamer USS Mahaska and the gunboat USS Commodore Perry (both United States Navy), the tug May Queen (United States Army), and troops of the 5th Pennsylvania Cavalry Regiment, 6th New York Cavalry Regiment, and 115th New York Infantry Regiment (all Union Army).
Nepenthe	United Kingdom	The ship was wrecked on Santo Antão, Cape Verde Islands. All on board were rescued. She was on a voyage from Liverpool to Calcutta, India.
Robert	United Kingdom	The schooner collided with another vessel and was abandoned by her crew. She was subsequently taken in to Ramsgate, Kent.
Unidentified vessels	Confederate States of America	American Civil War: A ferryboat, two sloops, a large scow, two barges, and four pontoon boats were destroyed on the Pamunkey River at White House, Virginia, by an expedition consisting of the armed sidewheel paddle steamer USS Mahaska and the gunboat USS Commodore Perry (both United States Navy), the tug May Queen (United States Army), and troops of the 5th Pennsylvania Cavalry Regiment, 6th New York Cavalry Regiment, and 115th New York Infantry Regiment (all Union Army).

== 8 January ==
List of shipwrecks: 8 January 1863
Ship	State	Description
Barmouth	United Kingdom	The smack ran aground on the Dutchman's Bank, off Beaumaris, Anglesey. She was on a voyage from Garston, Lancashire to Barmouth, Merionethshire. She was wrecked in a gale on 10 January. Her crew were rescued.
F. W. Bailey	Unknown	Becalmed and dragging her anchor, the 711-ton full-rigged ship drifted onto rocks 3 nautical miles (5.6 km) south of Point Lobos California, Confederate States of America and was wrecked with the loss of ten lives.
John and William	United Kingdom	The schooner ran aground on the Dutchman's Bank. She was on a voyage from Runcorn, Cheshire to Porthdinllaen, Caernarfonshire. She was wrecked in a gale on 10 January. Her crew were rescued.
John Williams	United Kingdom	The brig foundered in the Bay of Biscay. Her crew were rescued by the brig Alli (Russia). John Williams was on a voyage from Newcastle upon Tyne, Northumberland to Lisbon, Portugal.
Ouse	United Kingdom	The steamship ran aground at Dragør, Denmark. She was on a voyage from Danzig to Hull, Yorkshire. She was refloated and taken in to Copenhagen, Denmark.
Sanders	United Kingdom	The ship was abandoned in the Bay of Biscay in a sinking condition. She was on a voyage from London to Genoa and Livorno, Italy.

== 9 January ==
List of shipwrecks: 9 January 1863
Ship	State	Description
Amaranth	Prussia	The brig was driven ashore at Kingsdown, Kent, United Kingdom. She was refloated and taken in to Ramsgate, Kent.
Grunhorst	Duchy of Holstein	The galiot was driven ashore in the Eider. She was on a voyage from Newcastle upon Tyne, Northumberland, United Kingdom to Delve. She was refloated and taken in to Tönning in a severely leaky condition.
Herman	Hamburg	The ship ran aground on the Longsand, in the North Sea off the coast of Essex, United Kingdom. She was on a voyage from Hamburg to Saint Thomas, Virgin Islands. She was refloated and taken in to Sheerness, Kent, United Kingdom in a leaky condition.
Marie	Norway	The schooner ran aground on the Herd Sand, in the North Sea off the coast of County Durham. She was on a voyage from Ventava, Courland Governorate to North Shields, Northumberland. She was refloated and taken in to North Shields.
Montezuma	United States	The full-rigged ship ran aground on The Shingles, off the Isle of Wight, United Kingdom. She was on a voyage from South Shields, County DurhamSouth Shields to New York. She was refloated and taken in to Cowes, Isle of Wight in a leaky condition.
Pride of the West	United Kingdom	The barque was wrecked on the Dulas Rocks, on the coast of Anglesey. She was on a voyage from Liverpool, Lancashire to Montevideo, Uruguay. Pride of the West was refloated on 22 February and beached at Moelfre, Anglesey for repairs.
Ridesdale	United Kingdom	The brig, under tow of the tug Aid (United Kingdom) was run into by the steamship Ceylon (United Kingdom) and sank in Southampton Water off Calshot Castle, Hampshire One person on board each vessel was killed. Ridesdale was on a voyage from Southampton, Hampshire to the West Indies. Her crew were rescued by Aid. She was refloated on 29 May and beached at Southampton.
Sparkling Sea	United States	American Civil War: Carrying 70 men of the 25th Battery, New York Light Artillery, and 106 horses, the transport ran aground without loss of life off the coast of on Ajax Reef, about 10 nautical miles (19 km) from the Carysfort Reef Lighthouse, Florida, Confederate States of America. The gunboat USS Sagamore (United States Navy) removed the horses and some stores. By 18 January, Sparkling Sea was a total wreck.

== 10 January ==
List of shipwrecks: 10 January 1863
Ship	State	Description
Bussorah	United Kingdom	The steamship departed from Glasgow, Renfrewshire on her maiden voyage, bound for Madras, India. Presumed foundered off Islay, Inner Hebrides with the loss of all hands.

== 11 January ==
List of shipwrecks: 11 January 1863
Ship	State	Description
Adler	Flag unknown	The ship was driven ashore near Dungeness, Kent, United Kingdom. She was refloated the next day and taken in to Dover, Kent.
Grampus No. 2	United States	American Civil War: Carrying a cargo of coal and towing five coal barges, the 352-ton armed paddle steamer was captured on the Mississippi River just off the wharf at Memphis, Tennessee, Confederate States of America by troops of the Arkansas Cavalry Company (Confederate States Army). The Confederates ran her five miles upriver to Mound City, Arkansas, with the barges, where they set her on fire and cast her adrift on the Mississippi, and she and the barges sank.
Haidee	United Kingdom	The ship departed from Liverpool, Lancashire for Harbour Grace, Newfoundland, British North America. No furthert trace, presumed foundered with the loss of all hands.
USS Hatteras	United States Navy	Nineteenth-century illustration of USS Hatteras (right) sinking under fire from CSS Alabama (left). American Civil War, CSS Alabama's Gulf of Mexico Expeditionary Raid, Action off Galveston Light: The gunboat, a sidewheel paddle steamer, was sunk in combat with the screw sloop-of-war CSS Alabama (Confederate States Navy) in the Gulf of Mexico off Galveston, Texas, Confederate States of America with the loss of two lives. Alabama took her 118 survivors prisoner.
Margaret and Elizabeth	United Kingdom	The schooner ran aground off the coast of Nord, France. She was on a voyage from Newport, Monmouthshire to Dunkirk, Nord. She was refloated and taken in to Dunkirk.

== 12 January ==
List of shipwrecks: 12 January 1863
Ship	State	Description
Akbar	United Kingdom	The ship was wrecked at "Rietveld", Cape Colony. Her crew were rescued. She was on a voyage from Bangkok, Siam to Falmouth, Cornwall and London.
Edith	United Kingdom	The ship sprang a leak and was beached at Grimsby, Lincolnshire. She was on a voyage from Sunderland, County Durham to Rochester, Kent.
Emily	United Kingdom	The brig sprang a leak and was beached at Grimsby. She was on a voyage from Sunderland to Rochester.
Henrietta	United Kingdom	The brig ran aground on the Gunfleet Sand, in the North Sea off the coast of Suffolk. She was on a voyage from Hartlepool, County Durham to London. She was refloated with the assistance of four smacks and assisted in to Harwich in a severely leaky condition.
Lucy	United Kingdom	The ship ran aground in the Solent. She was on a voyage from Sunderland to Porto, Portugal. She was refloated and put in to Portsmouth, Hampshire.

== 13 January ==
List of shipwrecks: 13 January 1863
Ship	State	Description
Charter	United States	American Civil War: The 114-ton sternwheel paddle steamer was burned by troops of the cavalry brigade of Major General Joseph Wheeler (Confederate States Army) on the Nashville, Tennessee, side of the Cumberland River 5 miles (8 km) from Harpeth Shoals.
Fly	United Kingdom	The smack was wrecked near Fortrose, Cromartyshire. She was on a voyage from Beauly, Inverness-shire to Fortrose.
Mauney	United Kingdom	The brig ran aground on the Holm Sand, in the North Sea off the coast of Suffolk. She was on a voyage from Portsmouth, Hampshire to Sunderland, County Durham. She was refloated and taken in to Lowestoft, Suffolk.
Pelican	United Kingdom	The steamship was driven ashore at Waterloo, Lancashire. She was on a voyage from Liverpool, Lancashire to Cork. She was later refloated and resumed her voyage.
Trio	United States	American Civil War: Carrying 400 wounded Union Army troops and a cargo of cotton, the 150-ton sternwheel hospital steamer was captured and burned by troops of the cavalry brigade of Major General Joseph Wheeler (Confederate States Army) on the Nashville, Tennessee, Confederate States of America, side of the Cumberland River 5 nautical miles (9.3 km) from Harpeth Shoals.
W. H. Slidell	United States	American Civil War: The armed tinclad steamer was captured and burned by troops of the cavalry brigade of Major General Joseph Wheeler (Confederate States Army) on the Nashville side of the Cumberland River 5 nautical miles (9.3 km) from Harpeth Shoals.

== 14 January ==
List of shipwrecks: 14 January 1863
Ship	State	Description
Cambria	United Kingdom	The ship departed from Falmouth, Cornwall for Leith, Lothian. No further trace, presumed foundered with the loss of all hands.
USS Columbia	United States Navy	American Civil War, Union blockade: The armed screw steamer ran aground at Masonboro Inlet, North Carolina, Confederate States of America. After a gale struck on 15 January, the gunboat USS Penobscot (United States Navy) rescued 30 men from the wreck during the storm on 15–16 January before Confederate artillery drove her off. Confederate forces captured the wreck on 17 January and burned it.
Diadem	United Kingdom	The brig was driven ashore at Runton, Norfolk.
Earl of Derby	United Kingdom	The ship caught fire in Lough Foyle and was scuttled.
Edgar	United Kingdom	The brig collided with the brig Sceptre (United Kingdom) 3 nautical miles (5.6 km) off Southwold, Suffolk and was severely damaged. She was abandoned by her crew. Edgar was on a voyage from Colchester, Essex to Newcastle upon Tyne, Northumberland. She was subsequently taken in to Harwich, Essex.
Harry Haines	United Kingdom	The brig ran aground on the Lyng Sand, off the north Kent coast and was abandoned by her crew. She was on a voyage from South Shields, County Durham to Shoreham-by-Sea, Sussex.
John and Elizabeth	United Kingdom	The brig was driven ashore at Filey, Yorkshire. She was refloated and taken in to Bridlington, Yorkshire in a leaky condition.
Parthonia	United States	American Civil War: The 261-ton sternwheel paddle steamer was burned by Confederate States Army troops on the Cumberland River in Tennessee, Confederate States of America. They had captured her on the river the previous day at the head of Harpeth Shoals.
Pioneer	United Kingdom	The ship was wrecked on a reef off the Karren Islands, Netherlands East Indies. Her crew were rescued. She was on a voyage from Manila, Spanish East Indies to London.
Rose	France	The schooner was wrecked on the Villez Martin Rocks, on the coast of Loire-Inférieure. She was on a voyage from Dunkirk, Nord to Nantes, Loire-Inférieure.
Wyke Regis	United Kingdom	The brig foundered in the Atlantic Ocean. Her crew were rescued by Mercellus (United Kingdom). Wyke Regis was on a voyage from Huelva, Spain to Newcastle upon Tyne.

== 15 January ==
List of shipwrecks: 15 January 1863
Ship	State	Description
Dashaway	United States	The ship was driven ashore 20 nautical miles (37 km) north east of Cape May, New Jersey. She was on a voyage from Messina, Sicily, Italy to Philadelphia, Pennsylvania.
Iron Duke	United Kingdom	The steamship was driven ashore at Mockbeggar, Cheshire.
CSS J. A. Cotton	Confederate States Navy	American Civil War: The sidewheel partial ironclad gunboat was scuttled and burned by her crew in Bayou Teche off Brashear City, Louisiana, to serve as a blockship and to prevent her capture by Union forces after she was badly damaged in combat with United States Navy gunboats.
Mère de Famille	France	The ship was run down and sunk in the English Channel off Portland, Dorset, United Kingdom by Turk (United Kingdom). Her crew were rescued by Turk.
Petrel	United Kingdom	The paddle steamer was driven ashore on the Kyles of Bute, Argyllshire. All on board were rescued. She was on a voyage from Greenock, Renfrewshire to Tynemouth, Northumberland. She was refloated on 26 January.
Rosebud	United Kingdom	The ship was wrecked on the Barrow Sand, in the North Sea off the coast of Essex. Her five crew were rescued by the smack Alarm (United Kingdom). Rosebud was on a voyage from Gothenburg, Sweden to London. She was refloated and taken in to Sheerness, Kent in a sinking condition.

== 16 January ==
List of shipwrecks: 16 January 1863
Ship	State	Description
Alma	United Kingdom	The ship exploded in the Atlantic Ocean with the loss of all hands. She was on a voyage from Licata, Sicily, Italy to Plymouth, Devon.
Cadiz	United Kingdom	The ship caught fire at Hong Kong. She was on a voyage from Hong Kong to Shanghai.
Kezia	United Kingdom	The schooner ran aground on the Barber Sand, in the North Sea off the coast of Norfolk. Her five crew were rescued by the Caister Lifeboat. Kezia floated of and came ashore between Caister-on-Sea and Great Yarmouth, Norfolk.
Lambertonio	Flag unknown	The ship was driven ashore and wrecked at Azov, Russia.
Rapid	United Kingdom	The ship was driven ashore on Skagen, Denmark. She was on a voyage from Danzig to Hartlepool, County Durham. She was refloated and put in to Helsingør, Denmark in a leaky condition.
Tolo Sodskende	Denmark	The schooner collided with the brig Minerva ( Austrian Empire) off The Lizard, Cornwall, United Kingdom and foundered. Her crew were rescued by Minerva. Tolo Sodskende was on a voyage from Hull, Yorkshire, United Kingdom to Málaga, Spain and/or Malta.

== 17 January ==
List of shipwrecks: 17 January 1863
Ship	State	Description
Caractacus	United Kingdom	The brig was wrecked on Beata Island, Dominican Republic. She was on a voyage from Barcelona, Spain to Aux Cayes, Haiti.
Catharina Maria	United Kingdom	The schooner departed from Plymouth, Devon for Boulogne, Pas-de-Calais, France. No further trace, presumed foundered in the English Channel with the loss of all hands.
Chin-Chin	United Kingdom	The barque departed from Grangemouth, Stirlingshire on her maiden voyage, bound for Santos, Brazil. Presumed subsequently foundered with the loss of all hands. A boat washed up on the Dutch coast.
Irene	Norway	The ship was towed in to Gibraltar in a derelict condition by the steamship Pactolus (United Kingdom).
Nimrod	United Kingdom	The ship ran aground on the North Bull, in the Irish Sea off the coast of County Dublin. She was on a voyage from Swansea, Glamorgan to Glasgow, Renfrewshire.
Suite	France	The brig was wrecked at the mouth of the Adour with the loss of her captain. She was on a voyage from Newcastle upon Tyne, Northumberland, United Kingdom to Bayonne, Basses Pyrénées.
Thames	United Kingdom	The collier, a brig, collided with Hebe (United Kingdom) and foundered in the North Sea off Cromer, Norfolk. Her crew were rescued by Hebe.

== 18 January ==
List of shipwrecks: 18 January 1863
Ship	State	Description
Anna Catharina	Netherlands	The brig struck the Kentish Knock and was wrecked. Her crew were rescued. She was on a voyage from Amsterdam, North Holland to Surinam.
Beacon	United Kingdom	The schooner was driven ashore at Dungeness, Kent.
Colorado	United Kingdom	The ship ran aground at Havana, Cuba. She was on a voyage from Liverpool, Lancashire to Havana.
Eliza	United Kingdom	The barque was severely damaged fire at Jersey, Channel Islands.
Farosund	Sweden	The ship was driven ashore. She was on a voyage from Karlskrona to Leith, Lothian, United Kingdom. She was refloated and taken in to Lindisfarne, Northumberland, United Kingdom.
Pioneer	United Kingdom	The steamship was driven ashore at Blakeney, Norfolk. She was on a voyage from Newcastle upon Tyne, Northumberland to London. She was refloated and resumed her voyage.
Temperance	United Kingdom	The ship was wrecked at Penmaenmawr, Caernarfonshire. SHe was on a voyage from Liverpool, Lancashire to Menai Bridge, Anglesey.
Triton	United Kingdom	The ship departed from Sunderland, County Durham for Gravesend, Kent. No further trace, presumed foundered in the North Sea with the loss of all hands.
Tropic	Confederate States of America	American Civil War, Union blockade: The 323-ton sidewheel paddle steamer, carrying a cargo of cotton and turpentine, was destroyed by an accidental fire while attempting to run the Union blockade at Charleston, South Carolina, Confederate States of America. Her passengers and crew were rescued by the armed sidewheel paddle steamer USS Quaker City (United States Navy).
Tyne	United Kingdom	The ship struck the Sizewell Bank, in the North Sea off the coast of Suffolk and sank. Her crew were rescued. She was on a voyage from Sunderland to Littlehampton, Sussex.

== 19 January ==
List of shipwrecks: 19 January 1863
Ship	State	Description
Alfred Fanny	France	The lugger was driven ashore near Mablethorpe, Lincolnshire, United Kingdom. She was refloated with assistance from the tug Wilberforce and towed in to Grimsby, Lincolnshire in a leaky condition.
Anne	(United Kingdom of Great Britain and Ireland) Gibraltar	The ship was driven ashore at Whit-the-Bay, County Cork. She was on a voyage from Safi, Morocco to Queenstown, County Cork. She was refloated the next day and found to be severely damaged.
Calcutta	Italy	The barque was driven ashore at Queenstown. She was on a voyage from Sulina, Ottoman Empire to Crookhaven, County Cork and Queenstown.
Condor	Bremen	The ship ran aground in the Weser near Geestemünde. She was on a voyage from London, United Kingdom to Bremen. She was refloated with the assistance of two steamships and taken in to Bremen.
Eliza Ann and Hellen	United Kingdom	The sloop was driven ashore and severely damaged at Oban, Argyllshire. She was on a voyage from Wick, Caithness to Dublin.
Estelle	United States	American Civil War: The brig, carrying a cargo of honey and molasses from Santa Cruz to Boston, Massachusetts, was captured and burned in the Gulf of Mexico off Cuba (approx 23°34′N 83°50′W) by the screw sloop-of-war CSS Florida (Confederate States Navy).
Favourite	United Kingdom	The ship was driven ashore on Oyster Island, County Sligo.
Jane Miller	United Kingdom	The ship was driven ashore at Pittenweem, Fife. She was on a voyage from London to Pittenweem. She was refloated and taken in to Pittenweem.
Mayflower	United Kingdom	The smack sprang a leak and sank at Cowes, Isle of Wight. She was on a voyage from Southampton, Hampshire to Cowes.
Pioneer	United Kingdom	The brig was run into by the steamship Nova (United Kingdom) and sank in the North Sea 11 nautical miles (20 km) north east by north of Lowestoft, Suffolk. Her crew were rescued by the yawl Reliance (United Kingdom). Pioneer was on a voyage from Southwold, Suffolk to Newcastle upon Tyne, Northumberland.
Sea Swallow	United Kingdom	The barque foundered in the North Sea with the loss of four of her eleven crew Survivors were rescued by the Caister Lifeboat. She was on a voyage from Sunderland, County Durham to Bordeaux, Gironde, France.
St. Helena	United Kingdom	The collier, a brig, collided with the brig Friendship (United Kingdom) and foundered in the North Sea off Winterton-on-Sea, Norfolk. Her nine crew were rescued by the brig Coundon (United Kingdom. St. Helena was on a voyage from Sunderland to London.
Tubal Cain	United Kingdom	The ship was taken in to Dover, Kent in a sinking condition.
Union	United Kingdom	The schooner was driven ashore and severely damaged at Cairnryan, Wigtownshire. Her crew were rescued. She was on a voyage from Belfast, County Antrim to Londonderry.
Universe	United Kingdom	The ship was driven ashore on Oyster Island. She was refloated and taken in to Sligo.
W. F. Stafford	United Kingdom	The ship was abandoned on the Bahama Bank, in the Irish Sea. Her crew survived.

== 20 January ==
List of shipwrecks: 20 January 1863
Ship	State	Description
America	France	The steamship caught fire at Cádiz, Spain and was scuttled.
Annie Royden	United Kingdom	The ship ran aground in the Rankah Fulla Channel. She was on a voyage from Calcutta, India to Liverpool, Lancashire. She was refloated and resumed her voyage.
Arab	United Kingdom	The brig was driven ashore at "Carmarson", or "Llanaelhaem", in Carnarvon Bay. She was on a voyage from the Clyde to Porto, Portugal.
Cyril	United Kingdom	The schooner was driven against the pier and severely damaged at Milford Haven, Pembrokeshire.
Daring	United Kingdom	The brig sprang a leak and was abandoned 20 nautical miles (37 km) east south east of Lowestoft, Suffolk. Her seven crew were rescued by Emmanuel Boucher (United Kingdom). Daring was on a voyage from Middlesbrough, Yorkshire to Dunkirk, Nord, France.
Magician	United Kingdom	The ship was driven ashore at Whitehaven, Cumberland. She was on a voyage from Liverpool to Newport, Monmouthshire.
Magna Charta	United Kingdom	The ship ran aground on the Newcombe Sand, in the North Sea off the coast of Suffolk. She was on a voyage from South Shields, County Durham to Livorno, Italy. She was refloated and towed in to Lowestoft in a leaky condition.
Mary	United Kingdom	The ship foundered in the North Sea off Great Yarmouth, Norfolk. Her crew were rescued. She was on a voyage from Blyth, Northumberland to Rochester, Kent.
Medea	United Kingdom	The barque was driven ashore and wrecked at Penrhyn Point, Anglesey. Her crew were rescued by the Holyhead Lifeboat. She was on a voyage from the Cameroons, Africa to Liverpool, Lancashire.
Mudlark	United Kingdom	The unmanned dredger sank in a squall at Portsmouth, Hampshire.
Naples Packet	United Kingdom	The collier, a brig, collided with George Hughes (United Kingdom) and was abandoned in the North Sea off Aldeburgh, Suffolk. Her crew were rescued. She was on a voyage from South Shields, County Durham to Rochester, Kent.
Nazarine	(United States)	The barque was driven ashore and severely damaged at Cardiff, Glamorgan, United Kingdom. She was on a voyage from Cardiff to New York.
Nethan	United Kingdom	The crewless sloop drove out to sea from Grimsby, Lincolnshire. No further trace.
Permelia Flood	United States	The barque foundered in the Irish Sea 12 nautical miles (22 km) west north west of Holyhead, Anglesey with the loss of all but her captain. She was on a voyage from New Orleans, Louisiana, Confederate States of America to Liverpool.
Sabrina	United Kingdom	The steamship was driven ashore at Horse Head, County Cork. She was on a voyage from Cork to Bristol, Gloucestershire.
Sea Swallow	United Kingdom	The barque foundered in the North Sea off the coast of Norfolk with the loss of four of her seven crew. Survivors were rescued by the Yarmouth Lifeboat.
Selah	United Kingdom	The schooner was driven ashore on the coast of Anglesey. She was refloated on 7 February and towed in to Holyhead.
Transit	United Kingdom	The ship was driven ashore near Whitehaven, Cumberland. Her crew were rescued. She was on a voyage from Dublin to Whitehaven.
Twins	United Kingdom	The ship ran aground and sank at Barnstaple, Devon. She was on a voyage from Dublin to Antwerp, Belgium. She was refloated the next day and taken in to Barnstaple in a severely damaged condition.
Unity	United Kingdom	The smack was discovered abandoned off Margate, Kent and was taken in to that port.
Unnamed	Flag unknown	A ship was wrecked on the Tuskar Rock with the loss of all hands

== 21 January ==
List of shipwrecks: 21 January 1863
Ship	State	Description
Admiral	United Kingdom	The ship ran aground at Leasowe, Cheshire and sank. Her 30 crew were rescued by the tug Reliance (United Kingdom). Admiral was on a voyage from Liverpool, Lancashire to Bombay, India.
Agnes	United Kingdom	The schooner was severely damaged at Preston, Lancashire.
Alabama	United Kingdom	The ship was driven ashore at Buncrana, County Donegal. Her crew were rescued. She was on a voyage from Ardrossan, Ayrshire to Limerick.
Alma	United Kingdom	The ship sank in the Mediterranean Sea off Sicily, Italy. Her crew were rescued. She was on a voyage from Licata, Sicily to Falmouth, Cornwall.
Baron Campbell	United Kingdom	The smack was abandoned in the North Sea. Her crew were rescued by the smack Greyhound (United Kingdom).
Capriole	United Kingdom	The schooner was severely damaged at Preston.
Felix	France	The schooner was driven ashore on Ameland, Friesland, Netherlands. Three crew were rescued by the Ameland Lifeboat. She was on a voyage from Sunderland, County Durham, United Kingdom to Saint-Malo, Ille-et-Vilaine.
Foam	United Kingdom	The ship collided with another vessel in the English Channel. She put in to Dartmouth, Devon in a sinking condition.
James Riddell	United Kingdom	The snow was driven ashore and wrecked on the Mull of Galloway, Wigtownshire. Her crew were rescued. She was on a voyage from Alexandria, Egypt to the Clyde.
Jane G. Storer	United States	The full-rigged ship was driven ashore and wrecked near Waterloo, Lancashire with the loss of two of her eighteen crew. She was on a voyage from Portland, Maine to Kingstown, County Dublin, United Kingdom.
John H. Elliott	United States	The full-rigged ship ran aground on the Burbo Bank and broke her back. Her 51 passengers and crew were rescued by the tug United States (United Kingdom). John H. Elliott was on a voyage from Liverpool to New York.
Jules	United Kingdom	The schooner ran aground off Lindisfarne, Northumberland. She was on a voyage from Sunderland, County Durham to Arbroath, Forfarshire. She was refloated.
Kezia	United Kingdom	The schooner was driven ashore and wrecked at Great Yarmouth, Norfolk. She was on a voyage from Sunderland to Caen, Calvados, France.
Lady Vaughan	United Kingdom	The brig was abandoned in the North Sea 21 nautical miles (39 km) off Ostend, West Flanders, Belgium. Her crew were rescued by a Belgian fishing vessel. She was on a voyage from Sunderland to Saint-Malo, Ille-et-Vilaine, France.
Liberty	United States	American Civil War, Union blockade: After breaking loose from her moorings at Cornfield Harbor, Maryland, and drifting into the Coan River in Virginia, Confederate States of America, the barge was captured and burned in the Coan River by Confederates aboard the captured barge J. C. Davis (United States).
Milton	United Kingdom	The brig was driven ashore at Bangor, Caernarfonshire.
Norval	United Kingdom	The brig foundered in the North Sea off Lowestoft, Suffolk. Her crew were rescued by the barque Lizzie Tindal (United Kingdom). Norval was on a voyage from Newcastle upon Tyne, Northumberland to London.
Pride of Canada	United Kingdom	The ship was driven ashore at the mouth of the River Mersey. She was on a voyage from Benin, Africa to Liverpool.
Pulla	United Kingdom	The brig was abandoned in the North Sea. Her crew were rescued. She was on a voyage from Hartlepool, County Durham to London.
Punch	United Kingdom	The schooner was driven from her moorings, holed by her anchor, and sank at Preston. She was on a voyage from Newry, County Antrim to Preston.
Reuben	United Kingdom	The barque ran aground on the Salthouse Bank, in the Irish Sea off the coast of Lancashire. Some of her crew were rescued by the Lytham Lifeboat Jessie Knowles (United Kingdom), others came ashore in the ship's lifeboat. Reuben was on a voyage from "Wood Point" to Glasson Dock, Lancashire. She subsequently floated off and was wrecked on the Horse Bank.
Shelax	United Kingdom	The schooner was driven ashore and wrecked near Penrhyn Bay, Caernarfonshire. Her crew were rescued. She was on a voyage from Wexford to Barrow-in-Furness, Lancashire.
Spinner	United Kingdom	The barque was driven ashore at Formby, Lancashire. Some of her crew were rescued by the Formby Lifeboat, the rest reached shore in the ship's longboat. She was on a voyage from Sagua la Grande, Cuba to the Clyde.
Storey	United Kingdom	The steamship was wrecked with the loss of two of her crew. She was on a voyage from Poole, Dorset to Kingstown, County Dublin.
Stranger	United Kingdom	The schooner was driven ashore near 's-Gravenzande, South Holland, Netherlands. Her crew were rescued. She was on a voyage from Sunderland to Ostend.
Sydney	United Kingdom	The ship ran aground in the River Mersey. She was on a voyage from London to the Clyde. She was refloated with assistance from the tugs Reliance and Rover (both United Kingdom).
Unity	United Kingdom	The ship was discovered derelict off Margate, Kent. She was taken in to Margate.
Wilhelmina	Netherlands	The ship was driven ashore on Vlieland, Friesland with the loss of two of her crew. She was on a voyage from Groningen to London.
Hilbre Island Lifeboat	United Kingdom	The lifeboat was washed out of the lifeboat house in the Hilbre Islands, Cheshire and came ashore at Hoylake.
Unidentified schooner	Unknown	American Civil War, Union blockade: The schooner, a blockade runner heavily laden with supplies, was forced aground at New Topsail Inlet or Stump Inlet (sources disagree) on the coast of North Carolina, Confederate States of America by the armed screw steamer USS Daylight (United States Navy). She then was wrecked by Union gunfire, taking 20 to 25 shell hits.

== 22 January ==
List of shipwrecks: 22 January 1863
Ship	State	Description
Alarm	United Kingdom	The schooner ran aground on the Lemon Sand, in the North Sea. Three of her six crew got aboard a boat, they were rescued by the barque Lemuel (United Kingdom). Alarm was on a voyage from London to Seaham, County Durham.
Ceffiro	Spain	The barque collided with the barque D. B. R. and sank in the Strait of Gibraltar. She was on a voyage from Barcelona to Havana, Cuba.
Chase	United Kingdom	The ship was driven ashore at Alexandria, Egypt She was refloated the next day.
Congress	United Kingdom	The ship ran aground off Seacombe, Cheshire. She was on a voyage from Maryport, Cumberland to Liverpool, Lancashire.
Corris Ann	United States	American Civil War: During a voyage from Philadelphia, Pennsylvania, to Matanzas, Cuba, the brig was captured and burned in the Caribbean Sea near Cárdenas, Cuba, between Cay Piedras and Cay Mono by the screw sloop-of-war CSS Florida (Confederate States Navy). While burning, she drifted ashore inside the harbor at Cárdenas.
Eliza	United Kingdom	The schooner was driven ashore near Petten, North Holland, Netherlands. She was on a voyage from Newcastle upon Tyne, Northumberland to Plymouth, Devon.
Emily	United Kingdom	The schooner ran aground on Scroby Sands, Norfolk.She was assisted in to Great Yarmouth, Norfolk in a leaky condition by the Caister Lifeboat.
Euryanthe	Prussia	The ship was abandoned in the North Sea. She was on a voyage from Memel to Newcastle upon Tyne. She was taken in to Gothenburg, Sweden on 31 January.
Huntress	United States	American Civil War, Union blockade: The steamship was burnt whilst trying to leave Charleston, South Carolina.
India	United Kingdom	The ship ran aground on the South Sands, in the Strait of Malacca and capsized. Her 45 crew and 669 passengers were rescued on 25 January by the troopship HMS Vulcan (Royal Navy). India was on a voyage from Singapore, Straits Settlements to Jeddah, Jeddah Eyalet.
J. C. Davis	United States	American Civil War, Union blockade: After breaking loose from her moorings at Cornfield Harbor, Maryland, and drifting into the Coan River in Virginia, Confederate States of America where she was captured by Confederate forces, the barge was run aground and burned in the Coan River by the armed schooner USS Dan Smith (United States Navy).
Lucy	United Kingdom	The ship sank off Texel, North Holland. Her crew were rescued.
Margaret	United Kingdom	The brig was abandoned in the North Sea 90 nautical miles (170 km) north east by north of Flamborough Head, Yorkshire. Her crew were rescued by the smack Alice (United Kingdom).
Nicholai	Russia	The barque was driven ashore near Callantsoog, north Holland, Netherlands. She was on a voyage from London to Ostend, West Flanders, Belgium.
Southwick	United Kingdom	The steamship ran aground and was damaged at Sunderland, County Durham. She was refloated.
Thomas and Ann	United Kingdom	The ship was lost near Brouwershaven, Zeeland, Netherlands with the loss of a crew member. She was on a voyage from London to Dunkirk, Nord, France.
Windward	United States	American Civil War: The brig, carrying a cargo of molasses from Matanzas, to Portland, Maine, was captured and burned in the Caribbean Sea off the east coast of Cuba by the screw sloop-of-war CSS Florida (Confederate States Navy).

== 23 January ==
List of shipwrecks: 23 January 1863
Ship	State	Description
Dina	Netherlands	The koff was driven ashore near Lagos, Portugal. Her crew were rescued. She was on a voyage from Swansea, Glamorgan, United Kingdom to Alicante, Spain.
Duchess of Lancaster	United Kingdom	The schooner was wrecked on Longness Point, Isle of Man with the loss of seven of her eight crew. She was on a voyage from Whitehaven, Cumberland to Dublin.
Edgar	United Kingdom	The ship was abandoned in the North Sea. Her crew survived. She was on a voyage from Bourgas, Eyalet of Adrianople to Stockton-on-Tees, County Durham.
Huntsman	United Kingdom	The fishing smack was abandoned in the North Sea. Her crew were rescued by the fishing smack Rover's Bride (United Kingdom).
Isabella and Jane	United Kingdom	The schooner was damaged by fire at Belfast, County Antrim.
Jane Clark	United Kingdom	The brig was driven ashore near Katwijk aan Zee, North Holland, Netherlands. Her crew were rescued. Jane Clark was on a voyage from Hartlepool, County Durham to Ostend, West Flanders, Belgium. She had become a wreck by 31 January.
John Hall	United Kingdom	The ship was driven ashore near Havre de Grâce, Seine-Inférieure, France. Her crew were rescued. She was on a voyage from Havre, de Grâce to Newcastle upon Tyne, Northumberland.
Lady Seaham	United Kingdom	The collier foundered in the North Sea 30 nautical miles (56 km) east of Spurn Point, Yorkshire. Her crew were rescued by a fishing smack. She was on a voyage from Seaham, County Durham to London.
Magdalena	United Kingdom	The ship ran aground on the East Pole Bank, in the English Channel off the coast of Sussex and sank. Her crew were rescued. She was on a voyage from Havre de Grâce, Seine-Inférieure, France to Portsmouth, Hampshire.
Marion Jane	(United Kingdom of Great Britain and Ireland) Jamaica	The sloop was wrecked in Montego Bay.
Mary Jenkins	United Kingdom	The brig was driven ashore and wrecked at Breaksea Point, Glamorgan with the loss of all hands. She was on a voyage from Boston, Massachusetts, United States to Cardiff, Glamorgan.
CSS Morning Light	Confederate States Navy	American Civil War, Union blockade: The armed sloop was set afire by her crew to prevent her capture by the approaching gunboats USS Cayuga and USS New London (both United States Navy) and sank in the Gulf of Mexico just off Sabine Pass on the coast of Texas.
Two Brothers	United Kingdom	The ship was abandoned in the North Sea 60 nautical miles (110 km) off the coast of Norfolk. Her crew were rescued by the Barking smack Samuel Bales (United Kingdom). Two Brothers was on a voyage from South Shields, County Durham to London.
Victoria	United Kingdom	The brig was abandoned in the North Sea 50 nautical miles (93 km) off Lowestoft, Suffolk. Her crew were rescued by a smack. She was on a voyage from South Shields to Malta. Victoria was subsequently assisted in to Lowestoft Suffolk.
Webster	United Kingdom	The ship ran aground and sank in the Prince's Dock, Liverpool, Lancashire. She was on a voyage from New York, United States to Liverpool. She was refloated on 31 January.
Unnamed	France	A schooner was wrecked at Chichester, Sussex. Her crew survived.

== 24 January ==
List of shipwrecks: 24 January 1863
Ship	State	Description
Arthur	United Kingdom	The ship was driven ashore on Walney Island, Lancashire. She was on a voyage from Liverpool, Lancashire to Dublin.
Belfast	United Kingdom	The brigantine was driven ashore at Milford Haven, Pembrokeshire.
Belt	United Kingdom	The schooner was driven ashore at Milford Haven.
Bonnie Dundee	United Kingdom	The barque was wrecked on the Newcombe Sand, in the North Sea off the coast of Suffolk. Her thirteen crew were rescued by the Pakefield Lifeboat. She was on a voyage from Dundee, Forfarshire to Havana, Cuba, with coal.
B. S. Provie	India	The ship was wrecked on Mauritius.
Caroline	United Kingdom	The ship was abandoned in the North Sea. She was on a voyage from London to South Shields, County Durham. She subsequently came ashore near Ringkøbing, Denmark. She was later refloated, and sailed for an English port on 31 May.
Forward	United Kingdom	The schooner was abandoned in the North Sea 40 nautical miles (74 km) off Sunderland, County Durham. Her crew were rescued by Elizabeth (United Kingdom).
Franz	(Russian Empire) Grand Duchy of Finland	The ship ran aground on the Gunfleet Sand, in the North Sea off the coast of Essex, United Kingdom. She was on a voyage from Helsinki to London. She was refloated and put in to Harwich, Essex.
Lucerne	United Kingdom	The brig foundered in the North Sea 6 nautical miles (11 km) off Lowestoft, Suffolk. Her eight crew were rescued by the smacks Miriam and Waterwitch (both United Kingdom) with the loss of a crew member from Miriam. Lucerne was on a voyage from Hartlepool, County Durham to London.
Maitland	United Kingdom	The brig was driven ashore on Lindisfarne, Northumberland. She was on a voyage from Taganrog, Russia to Leith, Lothian. She subsequently capsized and sank. An attempt to refloat her on 8 February was unsuccessful. Maitland was refloated on 25 April and beached.
Mary Denham	United Kingdom	The ship was driven ashore and wrecked at Nash Point, Glamorgan with the loss of all hands. She was on a voyage from Boston, Massachusetts, United States to Cardiff, Glamorgan.
Mooresfoot, or Moorsfort	United Kingdom	The ship was wrecked on Mauritius with the loss of 30 lives. She was on a voyage from Calcutta, India to Mauritius.
St. George	United Kingdom	The brig foundered in the North Sea 20 nautical miles (37 km) off the coast of Norfolk. Her five crew were rescued by the schooner Rainbow (United Kingdom). St. George was on a voyage from Sunderland to London.
Stobenoth	United Kingdom	The barque was driven ashore at Penarth, Glamrgan.
United Friends	United Kingdom	The smack was driven ashore at Milford Haven.

== 25 January ==
List of shipwrecks: 25 January 1863
Ship	State	Description
Breeze	United Kingdom	The ship was driven ashore and wrecked on Terceira Island, Azores.
Figaro	France	The ship capsized off Margate, Kent, United Kingdom. Her crew were rescued. She was on a voyage from Cannes, Alpes-Maritimes to London, United Kingdom. She was towed in to Margate and righted.
Lady Wilton	United Kingdom	The ship was driven ashore at Alicante, Spain. She was on a voyage from Newcastle upon Tyne, Northumberland to Alicante. She was refloated the next day and taken in to Alicante.
New Pursuit	United Kingdom	The ship was driven ashore near Campbeltown, Argyllshire. She was on a voyage from Londonderry to Crinan, Argyllshire.

== 26 January ==
List of shipwrecks: 26 January 1863
Ship	State	Description
Elizabeth	United Kingdom	The schooner ran aground off Ellyr Holm, in the Orkney Islands. Her four crew were rescued. She was refloated on 29 January and taken in to Kirkwall.
Gipsy	United Kingdom	The smack was run down by a cutter and sank the North Sea. Her crew were rescued by the barque Auxilia (United Kingdom). Gipsy was on a voyage from Sunderland, County Durham to London.
Golden Rule	United States	American Civil War, CSS Alabama's Gulf of Mexico Expeditionary Raid: The 255-ton barque, carrying a cargo of food and medicine consigned to the Panama Railway Company and the Pacific Mail Steamship Company and a full set of sails and spars for the brig USS Bainbridge (United States Navy), was captured and burned in the Caribbean Sea off Haiti by the screw sloop-of-war CSS Alabama (Confederate States Navy).
Harmony	United Kingdom	The ship was driven ashore 6 nautical miles (11 km) north of Ramsey, Isle of Man. She was on a voyage from Workington, Cumberland to Drogheda, County Louth.
John and Eleanor	United Kingdom	The brig struck the Outer Binks, in the North Sea off the mouth of the Humber. Her crew abandoned ship and got aboard the New Sand Lightship ( Trinity House).
Leon	Spain	The brig was holed by ice and foundered in the Atlantic Ocean. Her crew took to a boat; they were rescued on 30 January by the barque Helen Campbell (United Kingdom). Leon was on a voyage from Newfoundland, British North America to Cádiz.
Meldon	United Kingdom	The brig foundered in the North Sea (52°50′N 3°50′E). Her crew were rescued by the brig Catherine and Anne (United Kingdom).
St. Patrick	United Kingdom	The smack was abandoned in the Irish Sea. Her three crew were rescued by the Llanallgo Lifeboat. She was on a voyage from an Irish port to Bangor, Caernarfonshire.

== 27 January ==
List of shipwrecks: 27 January 1863
Ship	State	Description
Burmah	United Kingdom	The steamship was driven ashore and wrecked near Pulicat, India. All on board were rescued.
Chastelain (or Chastelaine)	United States	American Civil War, CSS Alabama's Gulf of Mexico Expeditionary Raid: The 293-ton brig, on a voyage in ballast from Cienfuegos, Cuba, to Basse-Terre, Guadeloupe, was captured and burned in the Caribbean Sea south of Hispaniola about 5 nautical miles (9.3 km) south of Alto Velo Island (17°19′50″N 72°21′00″W) by the screw sloop-of-war CSS Alabama (Confederate States Navy).
Colonsay	United Kingdom	The ship ran aground on the Alceste Reef, in the Gaspard Straits. She was on a voyage from Melbourne, Victoria to Shanghai, China. She was refloated and towed in to "Billeton", where she was condemned.
Eliza	United Kingdom	The ship was abandoned in the Irish Sea off the Smalls Lighthouse, Cornwall. Her crew were rescued by the steamship Ceres (United Kingdom). Eliza was on a voyage form Moulmein, Burma to London. She was later towed in to Swansea, Glamorgan
Eliza Bell	United Kingdom	The brig capsized in the North Sea and was abandoned by her crew, who were rescued by the smack Roam About (United Kingdom). Presumed subsequently sank. She was on a voyage from West Hartlepool, County Durham to Bilbao, Spain.
Ganymede	United Kingdom	The schooner foundered in the North Sea. Her six crew were rescued by the smack Ruby (United Kingdom). Ganymede was on a voyage from South Shields, County Durham to London.
Lady Louisa	United Kingdom	The ship was abandoned on the Dogger Bank with the loss of three of her crew.
Saxon	United Kingdom	The brig foundered in the North Sea off the coast of Norfolk. Her crew were rescued. She was on a voyage from Sunderland, County Durham to Saint-Valery-sur-Somme, Somme, France.
St. James	France	The ship ran aground on the Avant Gard Rock. She was on a voyage from Rochefort, Charente-Intérieure to Melbourne, Victoria. She was refloated the next day.
Why Not	United Kingdom	The schooner foundered in the North Sea off Texel, North Holland, Netherlands with the loss of all hands.

== 28 January ==
List of shipwrecks: 28 January 1863
Ship	State	Description
Actif	Netherlands	The ship foundered on the Dogger Bank. Her crew were rescued. She was on a voyage from Sunderland, County Durham, United Kingdom to Seville, Spain.
Aeolus	United States	The brig was wrecked on the coast of California, Confederate States of America 1.5 nautical miles (2.8 km) south of the Humboldt Bay Bar.
Ben Nevis	United Kingdom	The ship ran ashore in the Little Passage. She was refloated and put back to St. Andrews, New Brunswick, British North America.
Elizabeth	United Kingdom	American Civil War, Union blockade: The sloop, a blockade runner carrying a cargo of salt, was captured and burned at the mouth of Jupiter Inlet on the coast of Florida, Confederate States of America by the gunboat USS Sagamore (United States Navy).
Mary Ann	Flag unknown	The schooner-rigged steamer was wrecked on the coast of California 1.5 nautical miles (2.8 km) south of the Humboldt Bay Bar. She was refloated on 29 June.
Mortimer Livingstone	United States	The full-rigged ship was driven ashore and wrecked in the Corson Inlet with the loss of two lives amongst her crew and 120 passengers. She was on a voyage from Havre de Grâce, Seine-Inférieure, France to New York.
Prince Alfred	United Kingdom	The ship was wrecked at Naples, Italy. Her crew were rescued.
Victory	United Kingdom	The ship collided with Brownfield (United Kingdom) and foundered in the North Sea off the coast of Yorkshire.

== 29 January ==
List of shipwrecks: 29 January 1863
Ship	State	Description
Amelia	United Kingdom	The schooner ran aground a Penarth, Glamorgan and was run into by an Austrian ship.
Ceres, and Thomas	United Kingdom	The brig Ceres collided with the barque Thomas (United Kingdom) in the Bristol Channel and was abandoned by her crew. They were rescued by a Norwegian vessel. Ceres was on a voyage from Lydney, Gloucestershire to Wick, Caithness. She was towed in to Cardiff, Glamorgan in a derelict condition. Thomas was abandoned by her crew. She was subsequently taken in to Newport, Monmouthshire.
Empress	United Kingdom	The brig was wrecked on the Ooster Bank, in the North Sea off the coast of Zeeland, Netherlands. Her crew were rescued.
Fellowship	United Kingdom	The brig foundered 30 nautical miles (56 km) off Lowestoft, Suffolk. Her crew were rescued by Rochdale (United Kingdom). Fellowship was on a voyage from Seaham, County Durham to London.
Gosforth	United Kingdom	The brig ran aground off Lowestoft. She was on a voyage from South Shields, County Durham to London and/or Southampton, Hampshire. She was refloated and taken in to Lowestoft in a leaky condition.
Japhet	France	The lugger was wrecked on Texel, North Holland, Netherlands. Her crew were rescued. She was on a voyage from Blyth, Northumberland, United Kingdom to Abbeville, Somme.
Mary	United Kingdom	The ship foundered in the North Sea 20 nautical miles (37 km) off the St. Nicholas Lightship ( Trinity House ). Her crew were rescued by Alma (United Kingdom). Mary was on a voyage from Blyth to Rochester, Kent.
Robina	United Kingdom	The ship was driven ashore on Governors Island, New York City, United States. She was on a voyage from New York City to London. She was refloated on 30 January and taken in to the North River.

== 30 January ==
List of shipwrecks: 30 January 1863
Ship	State	Description
George Sand	Flag unknown	Carrying US$13,000,000 in gold and silver bars and specie from California, the barque foundered in 360 feet (110 m) of water on the Praetus Shoals in the South China Sea 180 nautical miles (330 km) southwest of Hong Kong.
USS Isaac Smith	United States Navy	American Civil War: The screw steamer ran aground under fire from Confederate States Army troops on the Stono River above Legareville, South Carolina, Confederate States of America, and was captured by the Confederates.

== 31 January ==
List of shipwrecks: 31 January 1863
Ship	State	Description
Cecilie	France	The ship was wrecked off Cap-Haïtien, Haiti. She was on a voyage from Nantes, Loire-Inférieure to Cap-Haïtiten.
Ellen Murray	(United Kingdom of Great Britain and Ireland) Jersey	The schooner foundered in the North Sea 50 nautical miles (93 km) off Lowestoft, Suffolk with the loss of two of her six crew. Survivors were rescued by Mystery (United Kingdom). Ellen Murray was on a voyage from Hartlepool, County Durham to Jersey.
Gipsy	Netherlands	The fishing boat capsized in the Wadden Sea south of Ameland, Friesland, Netherlands.
Joseph Gilchrist	United States	The full-rigged ship caught fire at New YOrk. The fire was extinguished with assistance from Forward ( United States Revenue Marine). Joseph Gilchrist was on a voyage from New York to Liverpool, Lancashire, United Kingdom. She proceeded on her voyage.
Reaper	United Kingdom	The barque was driven ashore and wrecked in the Rio Grande do Sul. She was on a voyage from Cádiz, Spain to the River Plate.
Simpson	United Kingdom	The smack sprang a leak and was beached on Ailsa Craig, in the Firth of Forth, where she subsequently sank. Her three crew were rescued. She was on a voyage from Belfast, County Antrim to Port Dundas, Renfrewshire.

== Unknown date ==
List of shipwrecks: Unknown date in January 1863
Ship	State	Description
Alfalfa	United States	The schooner was lost at English Harbour, Newfoundland. Crew saved.
Amy Louise	France	The ship ran aground on the Sunk Sand, in the North Sea off the coast of Essex, United Kingdom. She was refloated and assisted in to Harwich, Essex by the smack Queen (United Kingdom.
August	Stettin	The barque was run into off Harwich. She was assisted in to Harwich by the smack Snowdrop (United Kingdom).
Camilla	United Kingdom	The ship was wrecked. She was on a voyage from Memel, Prussia to London.
Challenge	United Kingdom	The ship was driven ashore near Weymouth, Dorset in a derelict condition before 11 January.
Chevalle	United States	The ship was lost at Aden.
Convoy	United States	The ship sprang a leak and was beached on the Long Nose. She was on a voyage from South Shields, County Durham, United Kingdom to New York. She was refloated and taken in to Ramsgate, Kent, United Kingdom.
Danzig	Flag unknown	The barque was partly abandoned off the Sunk Sand. Four of her crew got aboard the Sunk Lightship ( Trinity House ). Danzig was assisted in to Harwich by the smack Afred (United Kingdom).
Derwent	United Kingdom	The ship was driven ashore on the coast of Ayrshire. She was refloated on 21 February and taken in to Ayr in a leaky condition.
Emmanuel	United Kingdom	The ship was wrecked on Sarn Badrig. Her crew survived. She floated off and came ashore at Harlech, Caernarfonshire on 26 January and was dashed to pieces.
Fidelity	United Kingdom	The brig foundered off Texel, North Holland, Netherlands before 5 January. She was on a voyage from South Shields to London.
Four Brodre	Denmark	The ship sank off Farø. She was on a voyage from an English port to "Croskjobing".
Haabet	Norway	The ship was lost on the "Jaddin". She was on a voyage from Colberg to Bergen.
Harold, or Herald	United Kingdom	The ship was abandoned in the Atlantic Ocean before 6 January. Her crew were rescued by Express (United Kingdom). Harold was on a voyage from New York to Queenstown, County Cork.
Heinrich Sorensen	Russia	The barque was driven ashore and wrecked at Breaksea Point, Glamorgan, United Kingdom. Her twelve crew were rescued. She was on a voyage from Bordeaux, Gironde, France to Cardiff, Glamorgan.
James and Agnes	United Kingdom	The brig was abandoned off the Outer Dowsing Sandbank, in the North Sea. Her crew were rescued. She was on a voyage from Danzig to London.
Johanna	Denmark	The ship was wrecked at the entrance to the Agger Canal. Her crew were rescued. She was on a voyage from Hull, Yorkshire, United Kingdom to Copenhagen.
John Buddle	United Kingdom	The brig foundered in the North Sea. Her crew were rescued by the smack Antelope (United Kingdom). John Buddle was on a voyage from Hartlepool, County Durham to London.
Jurgen Lorentsen	United States	The ship was wrecked on Christmas Island in mid-January. She was on a voyage from San Francisco, California to Sydney, New South Wales.
Kirslimeminde	Denmark	The ship was lost near Ringkøbing. She was on a voyage from Thisted to an English port.
Laurel	United Kingdom	The brig was abandoned east of the North Hinder Sandbank, in the North Sea. Her crew were rescued by a fishing smack. She was on a voyage from South Shields to Harwich.
Latona	United Kingdom	The ship was driven ashore in the Bangka Strait. She was on a voyage from London to Singapore, Straits Settlements. She was refloated.
Lebanon	United Kingdom	The schooner was abandoned in the North Sea 50 nautical miles (93 km) off St. Abbs Head, Berwickshire. Her crew were rescued by the schooner Ann (United Kingdom). Lebanon was on a voyage from Middlesbrough, Yorkshire to Dundee, Forfarshire.
Liebretz	United States	The ship was abandoned in the Atlantic Ocean. Her crew survived. She was on a voyage from New York to Bristol, Gloucestershire, United Kingdom.
Madeira Packet	United Kingdom	The ship was wrecked at Larache, Morocco. She was on a voyage from Larache to Londonh.
Major	United Kingdom	The ship was wrecked near Belize City, British Honduras before 13 January. She was on a voyage from London to Belize City.
Marie and Joseph	Kingdom of Italy	The brig was driven ashore on Noirmoutier, Vendée, France. She was on a voyage from and English port to Nantes, Loire-Inférieure, France. She had been refloated by 20 February with assistance from the steamship Yankee (France) and towed in to Paimbœuf, Loire-Inférieure.
Nina	Confederate States of America	American Civil War, Union blockade: The 338-bulk ton sidewheel paddle steamer, a blockade runner, foundered in the North Atlantic Ocean between Nassau and Charleston, South Carolina in late January.
Noonday	United States	The 2,000-ton clipper sank in 240 feet (73 m)) of water within an hour of striking Fanny Rock – subsequently renamed Noonday Rock – in the Farallon Islands off the coast of California, Confederate States of America on 1 or 2 January. The pilot boat Relief (United States) rescued her crew.
Ocean Gem	(United Kingdom of Great Britain and Ireland) British North America	The ship was abandoned in the Atlantic Ocean. Her crew were rescued by National (United Kingdom).
Omar Pasha	United Kingdom	The ship foundered. Her crew were rescued.
Pamela Flood	United States	The barque foundered with the loss of all but her captain. She was on a voyage from New Orleans, Louisiana, Confederate States of America to Liverpool, Lancashire, United Kingdom.
Paul	Russia	The ship was wrecked off "Gold Island", County Donegal, United Kingdom. She was on a voyage from Belfast, County Antrim, United Kingdom to Trieste.
Persian	United Kingdom	The ship was abandoned in the Atlantic Ocean before 26 January. Her crew were rescued. She was on a voyage from Manila, Spanish East Indies to a British port.
Port Packet	United Kingdom	The ship was presumed to have foundered in the North Sea with the loss of all hands.
Problem	United Kingdom	The schooner was presumed to have foundered with the loss of all hands. She was on a voyage from a Baltic port to Ipswich, Suffolk.
Rena	United Kingdom	The ship was lost at the mouth of the River Thames. She was on a voyage from London to the Koogerpolder.
Richard Thornton	United Kingdom	The ship was driven ashore in the Dardanelles. She was later refloated, and arrived at Malta on 25 January.
Shah Allum	India	The ship was reported missing. She was on a voyage from Calcutta to Mauritius.
Spray	United Kingdom	The schooner foundered in the North Sea 60 nautical miles (110 km) off Great Yarmouth, Norfolk. Her crew were rescued. She was on a voyage from Seaham, County Durham to London.
Thatiglet	Russia	The ship was driven ashore 8 nautical miles (15 km) north of Fredrikshavn, Denmark. She was on a voyage from Newcastle upon Tyne, Northumberland, United Kingdom to Seville, Spain. She was refloated on 30 January and taken in to Fredrikshavn.
William Hutton	United Kingdom	The ship foundered off East London, Cape Colony.
Unidentified sloop	Confederate States of America	The sloop was wrecked in King's Creek in Virginia.
