= Homer C. Blake =

United States Navy officer

Homer Crane Blake
- Born: 1 February 1822; Dutchess County, New York
- Died: 21 January 1880 (aged 57); New York City
- Military career
- Allegiance: United States
- Branch: United States Navy
- Service years: 1840–1880
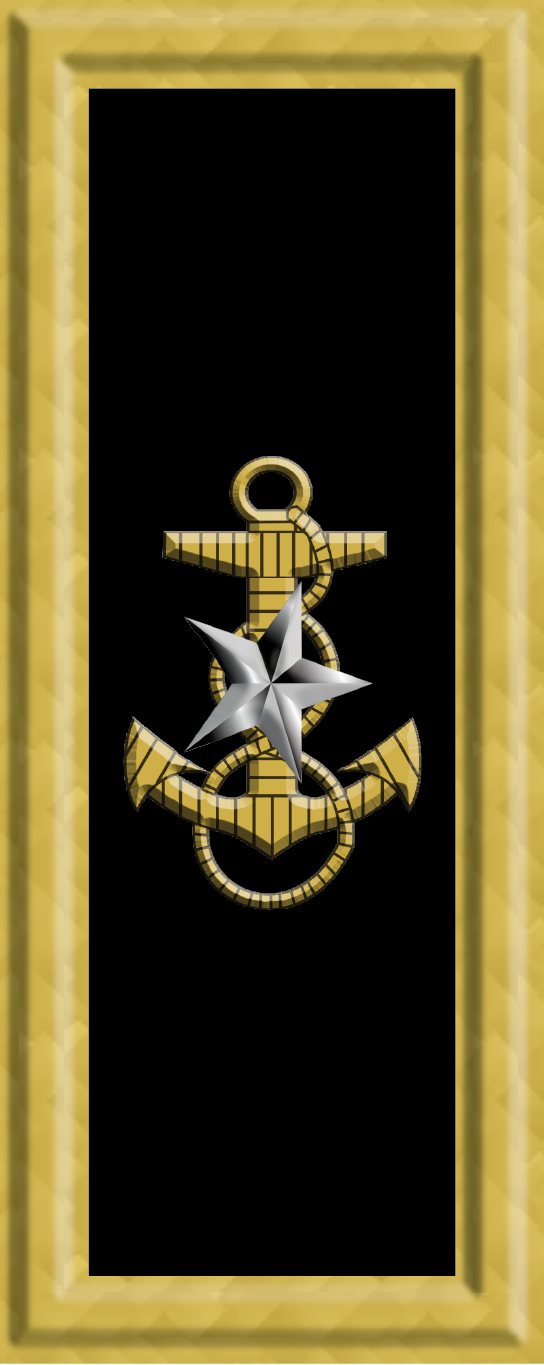
- Rank: Commodore
- Commands: Bibb; R. R. Cuyler; Hatteras; Eutaw; Swatara; Alaska
- Conflicts: Mexican–American War; American Civil War; Korean Expedition

Commodore Homer Crane Blake (1 February 1822 – 21 January 1880) was a flag officer of the United States Navy, notable for his gallant but ultimately doomed battle with the CSS Alabama in his ship USS Hatteras in the action off Galveston Light during the American Civil War. He later served with distinction on the James River, and in 1871, while serving in the Asiatic Squadron, took part in the Korea Expedition.

== Biography ==
=== Early career ===
Blake was born in Dutchess County, New York, the son of Elisha Blake (1788–1837) and Merilla Crane (1791–1877). When Blake was a year old, his family moved to what was then considered the far West, and settled in Boardman, Ohio.

After preparing himself for the naval service, and passing the regular examination, Blake joined the Navy on 2 March 1840, soon after his 18th birthday, with the rank of midshipman. He was sent to the receiving ship Ohio at Boston, remaining there until joining the frigate Constellation in December 1840, and making a cruise around the world. A few weeks after his return in 1842 he joined the sloop-of-war Preble, serving in her as part of the Africa Squadron, engaged in suppressing the slave-trade. In 1845 he returned to the United States to attend the newly established United States Naval Academy, graduating with the rank of passed midshipman on 12 July 1846.

Blake then returned to the Preble and served in her on the coast of California during the Mexican–American War. In 1848 Preble was sent to join the East India Squadron. Unfortunately Blake became ill and was left at the Sandwich Islands to recover. After a few weeks he took passage on the ship Matilda to China, rejoining the Preble at Canton. Soon after his arrival he once again fell seriously ill, and was sent home to recuperate. After a short leave of absence, he was ordered to the receiving ship North Carolina at New York, and from there assigned to the United States Coast Survey schooner Morris, in which he sailed to the coast of Texas to carry out survey work in Galveston Bay and Harbor.

In 1850 Blake joined the frigate Raritan, bound for the Pacific, but was soon transferred to the sloop-of-war St. Mary's with the rank of Acting-Master, serving in the East India Squadron. He returned home by way of the Cape of Good Hope, thus completing his third circumnavigation in nine years.

In 1852 he was sent to the Naval Observatory, where he was engaged for five months. In 1853 he was assigned to the receiving ship Ohio at Boston, as Acting-Master, and while there was detailed by Commodore Francis Gregory (Commandant of the Boston Navy Yard) to supervise the construction of the frigate Merrimack. On 14 September 1855, while at Boston, he received promotion to lieutenant.

In 1856 he joined the St. Lawrence in the Brazil Squadron, returning home in 1859. He was then appointed executive officer of the store-ship Relief, and sent to Luanda on the coast of Africa, to supply the Africa Squadron, returning in 1861. At the request of the Secretary of the Treasury, he was made member of a board to reorganize the Revenue Service. For a short time he commanded the Bibb, stationed in Lower New York Bay to intercept shipments of arms to the South.

=== Civil War ===
On the outbreak of the Civil War Blake applied for active duty in the Union Navy. In June 1861 he was ordered to join the frigate Sabine employed on the coast of South Carolina. His ship was assigned to the Port Royal expedition in November, but was delayed by rescuing the crew of the Governor during a violent storm, and did not arrive in time to take part in the engagement.

On 16 July 1862 Blake was promoted to lieutenant-commander and given command of the steamer R. R. Cuyler. However his time in her was short, and he was soon transferred to command of the Hatteras; an iron-hulled ship of 1,000 tons burthen, originally built as a passenger ship. She had been requisitioned by the navy, planked and armed with four 32-pounder guns, two 30-pounder rifles, and one 20-pounder rifle, with a total broadside weight of metal of 114 pounds (52 kg). Blake joined Hatteras in November 1862, and arrived off Galveston on 6 January 1863.

==== Hatteras v. Alabama ====
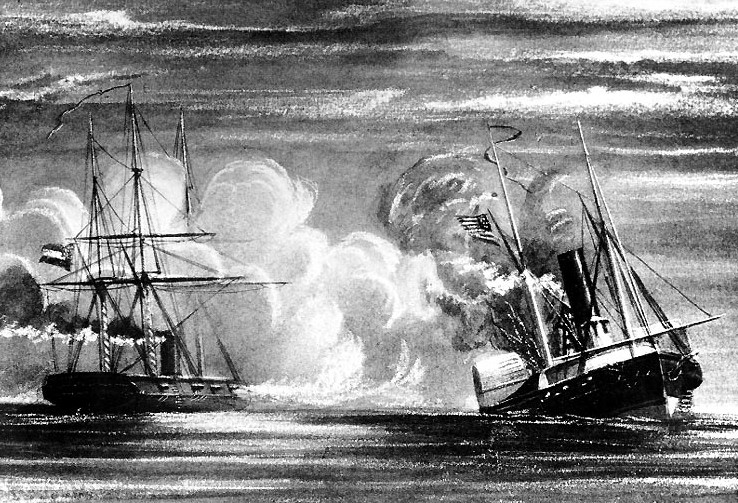
The sinking of Hatteras by CSS Alabama, off Galveston, Texas, 11 January 1863.

Hatteras, as part of the West Gulf Blockading Squadron, patrolled the coast as part of the fleet under the command of Commodore Henry H. Bell. On the afternoon of 11 January 1863, she was ordered to sail to the south-east. After one and a half hours a ship was seen. Blake approached and soon identified her as the Confederate raider CSS Alabama, then under the command Raphael Semmes. Blake knew that the rest of the fleet were too far off to render any assistance and that his own ship was outgunned (Alabama was armed with six 32-pounders, one 110-pounder, and one 68-pounder). Despite this Blake ordered his vessel to clear for action, hoping to capture the Alabama by boarding, or to disable her for long enough for the rest of the fleet to arrive.

Night began to fall as the two ships closed. At a distance of 75 yards (69 m) Blake hailed the ship, which identified herself as "Her Britannic Majesty's ship Vixen." However, when Blake ordered a boat to be lowered to board her, a voice shouted, "We are the Confederate steamer Alabama," followed by a full broadside. The guns of Hatteras replied, and Blake attempted to close with the Alabama, but Semmes used his superior speed to keep his distance and battered the Hatteras to a burning wreck within 20 minutes. When Blake saw that his ship was sinking under him, he signalled his surrender. The Alabama ceased fire and immediately offered assistance. Boats from Alabama rescued the crew, with Blake being the last man to leave. Only minutes later the Hatteras sank. Commodore Bell, having seen and heard the gunfire from twenty miles away, had immediately sent off three vessels to aid the Hatteras, but they were unable to find her in the dark. The next day they found the mastheads of the Hatteras standing upright out of water.

Meanwhile, the Alabama had sailed for Kingston, Jamaica, with her prisoners, arriving there nine days later. Despite the shortness of the battle Alabama was obliged to remain in port for some days making repairs. Though Blake had lost his ship, he had frustrated Semmes' plan to resupply his ship from captured merchantmen off Galveston, and then sail to the mouth of the Mississippi River. The officers and men of the Hatteras left Jamaica on 4 February aboard the ship Borodino of Boston, stopping at Key West on the 15th, before proceeding to New York.

==== On the James River ====
Blake was given command of the gunboat Eutaw stationed in the James River, engaged in transporting troops and in occasional engagements with the enemy. The most important of these was on 24 January 1865, when a powerful Confederate squadron launched an attack on the Union blockade of the river at Trent's Reach. Sailing downriver the Confederate force drove away the Union pickets, and commenced removing the boom and obstructions. William A. Parker, the Union naval commander, instead protecting the defences, retired and allowed them to be removed, leaving a clear passage for the enemy. However, two rams went aground, and the Confederates had to wait until high water the following night before proceeding. On the morning of the 25th, Parker was relieved of his command and Blake was made temporary commander of the naval division. Blake ordered the monitor Onondaga to put herself into a position within the range of enemy batteries, such that, if sunk, she would take the place of the removed obstructions. Subsequent attacks by Union ships and shore batteries sank two and badly damaged six of the Confederate ships, who eventually withdrew. After dark a party from Eutaw, commanded by Acting-Ensign Thomas Morgan boarded the abandoned CSS Scorpion and re-floated her, finding her not as damaged as believed. In a letter Admiral David Dixon Porter wrote to Blake, "Had your predecessor done as well, we should now be in possession of the entire rebel navy, and on our way to Richmond." Blake continued to command the ironclads and naval picket line until the fall of Richmond and end of the war in April 1865. He was then in charge of the removal of the torpedoes and obstructions from the James River.

=== Post-war career ===
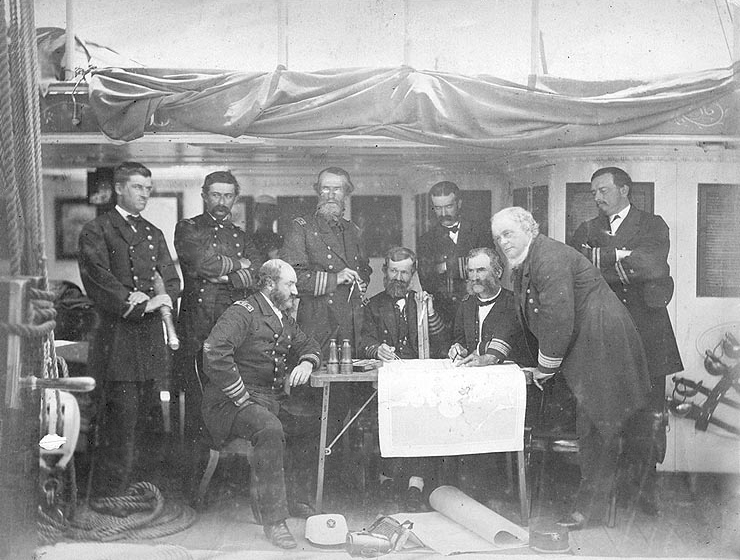
A posed photograph of U.S. Navy officers holding a council of war aboard the Asiatic Squadron flagship, the steam frigate USS Colorado, off Korea in June 1871 prior to the Korean Expedition. Commander Homer C. Blake, commanding officer of the sloop-of-war USS Alaska, stands third from left.

Blake then served at the Navy's Bureau of Navigation at Portsmouth, New Hampshire receiving promotion to commander on 3 March 1866. He commanded the sloop Swatara on the European Squadron in 1868, and on 8 December 1869, commissioned the sloop Alaska. The Alaska sailed from New York on 9 April 1870, in company with Rear Admiral John Rodger's flagship, Colorado, but soon parted company, and steamed independently to the Far East. Alaska visited many of the more important ports to show the flag.

Blake was promoted to captain on 25 May 1871, and soon after joined four other ships of the Asiatic Squadron in an expedition to Korea. In early June, while sailing up the Han River the American ships were fired upon from forts on shore, and Rodgers decided upon a punitive action to capture and destroy them in reprisal. In the subsequent battle of Ganghwa Blake took command of the ground attack forces, successfully capturing three forts. The next day the landing force re-embarked to await the Korean government's response. By 3 July, it became apparent that the Koreans would make no official response to the action and that the desired treaty was not in the offing. Accordingly, Alaska and her consorts got underway to resume their duties on the Asiatic station, finally sailing from Hong Kong on 28 October 1872 bound for New York.

On returning home in early 1873, Blake commanded the Naval Rendezvous in New York until 1876. In late 1879, on the retirement of Commodore James Mullany, Blake was nominated for promotion to commodore, and was successfully examined at Washington, D.C. However he became ill, and soon after receiving his commission on 12 January 1880, he died, reportedly of malaria, on the afternoon of 21 January 1880 at his home at 10 East 33rd Street, New York. His funeral was held at the Church of the Atonement on Madison Avenue and 28th Street on 24 January. He left a widow and a daughter, his only son, a law student, having died two years earlier.
