= USS Gillis =

Tender of the United States Navy

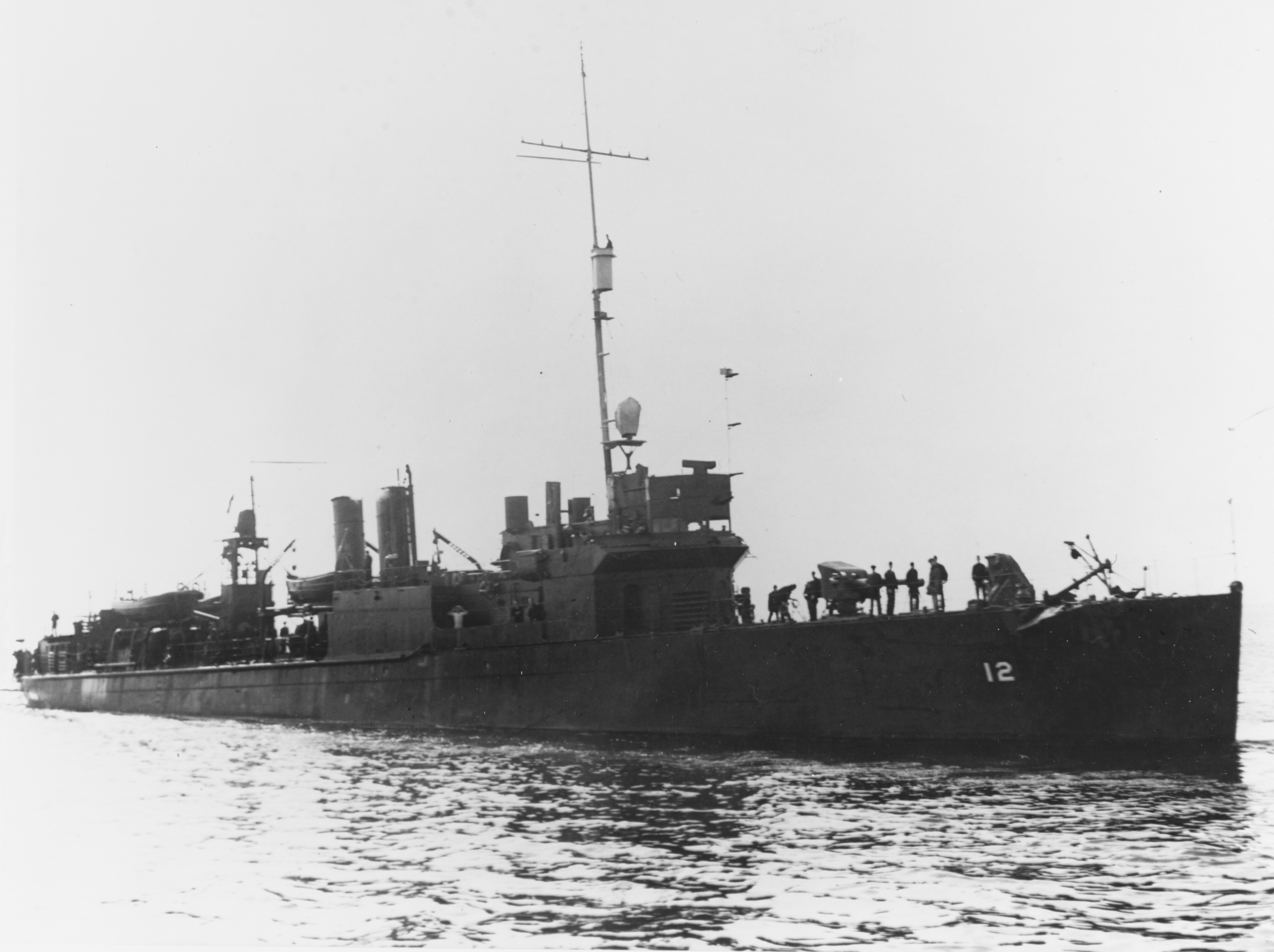
- Gillis as a seaplane tender in 1941

History

United States
- Namesake: John P. Gillis
- Builder: Bethlehem Shipbuilding Corporation, Fore River Shipyard, Quincy
- Laid down: 19 December 1918
- Launched: 17 May 1919
- Commissioned: 24 September 1919
- Decommissioned: 15 October 1945
- Stricken: 1 November 1945
- Fate: Sold for scrapping, 29 January 1946

General characteristics
- Class & type: Clemson-class destroyer
- Displacement: 1,190 tons
- Length: 314 feet 5 inches (95.83 m)
- Beam: 31 feet 8 inches (9.65 m)
- Draft: 9 feet 3 inches (2.82 m)
- Propulsion: 26,500 shp (20 MW); geared turbines, 2 screws
- Speed: 35 knots (65 km/h)
- Range: 4,900 nautical miles (9,100 kilometres); @ 15 kt
- Complement: 120 officers and enlisted
- Armament: 4 x 4 in (100 mm) guns, 2 x 3 in (76 mm) guns, 4 x 21 inch (533 mm) tt.

USS Gillis (DD-260/AVD-12) was a Clemson-class destroyer in the United States Navy. She was named for Commodore John P. Gillis and Rear Admiral James Henry Gillis.

== History ==
=== 1919–1940 ===
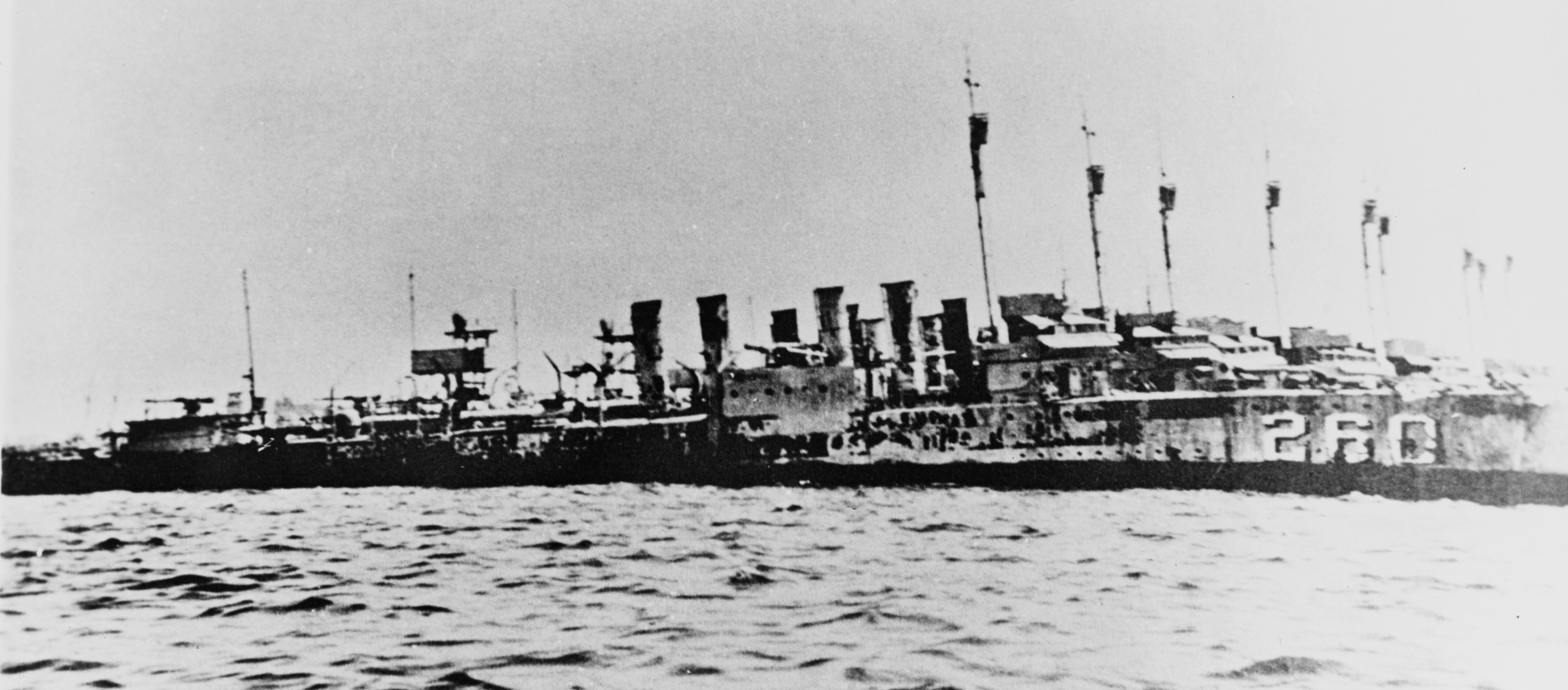
Gillis laid up and rusting, in 1929.

Gillis was launched 29 May 1919 by the Bethlehem Shipbuilding Corporation; sponsored by Miss Helen Irvine Murray, granddaughter of Admiral Gillis; and Mrs. Josephine T. Smith, niece of Commodore Gillis; commissioned 3 September 1919.

Gillis sailed from Newport, Rhode Island, 17 December 1919 and moored at San Diego, California 20 January 1920. She joined the Pacific Fleet Destroyer Force in tactics and maneuvers along the West Coast until decommissioned at San Diego 26 May 1922.

=== 1940–1946 ===
Recommissioned in ordinary 28 June 1940, she was reclassified 2 August as seaplane tender destroyer AVD-12. Following conversion she was placed in full commission at San Francisco, California, 25 March 1941.

Gillis was assigned as tender to Patrol Wing 4, Aircraft Scouting Force, U.S. Pacific Fleet. In the following months she performed plane guard patrol between San Diego and Seattle, Washington with time out for aircraft tending duties at Sitka, Alaska (14–17 June); Dutch Harbor and Kodiak (15–31 July). After overhaul in the Puget Sound Naval Shipyard she returned to Kodiak 16 October 1941 to resume tending of amphibious patrol planes in Alaskan waters. She was serving at Kodiak when the Japanese attacked Pearl Harbor and returned to the Puget Sound Naval Shipyard 9 February 1942 for overhaul.

Gillis resumed tender duties at Kodiak 26 May 1942. She was stationed at Atka (11–13 June) tending amphibious patrol aircraft bombing the Japanese on Kiska Island. On air-sea rescue patrol 6 June 1942, she made three depth charge runs on an underwater sound contact. A Japanese submarine violently broached the surface revealing its conning tower and propeller, then disappeared. Gillis was unable to regain contact. She was credited with damaging this undersea raider in the combat area off Umak Island. She was attacked by three Japanese patrol bombers while at Adak 20 July. One bomb, a dud, splashed within 10 feet alongside. Other bombs rained about her, ahead and astern. She was drenched by water thrown up by the explosions but escaped damage or casualties.

Gillis continued her varied duties as aircraft tender and air-sea rescue patrol ship throughout the Aleutian Campaign. Brief intervals of repair were accomplished in the Puget Sound Naval Shipyard. She terminated this service 19 April 1944 when she departed Dutch Harbor for overhaul in the Puget Sound Naval Shipyard. She arrived at San Diego 13 June and spent the following months as plane guard for aircraft carriers training along the California coast. She was then routed on to Pearl Harbor, arriving 8 December 1944. She operated in Hawaiian waters as plane guard for escort carrier Makassar Strait (CVE-91) until 20 February 1945. She then sailed with Rear Admiral Morton L. Deyo's Gunfire and Covering Force, en route via the Marshalls, Marianas and Ulithi for the invasion of Okinawa.

Gillis arrived off Kerama Retto 25 March 1945. She guarded minesweepers to the west, then stood by underwater demolition teams clearing approaches to the western beaches of Okinawa. After invasion forces stormed ashore 1 April, she tended observation and patrol planes at Kerama Retto and performed air-sea rescue patrol. On 28 April she departed Okinawa in the screen of Makassar Strait, bound via Guam to San Pedro Bay, Philippine Islands. She returned by the same route in the escort screen of Wake Island (CVE-65). That carrier launched planes 29 June to land bases on Okinawa and Gillis helped escort her back to Guam 3 July 1945.

== Fate ==
Gillis departed Guam for home 8 July 1945. She arrived at San Pedro, Los Angeles, California, 28 July and decommissioned there 15 October 1945. Her name was struck from the Navy List 1 November 1945. She was sold for scrapping 29 January 1946.

Gillis received two battle stars for service in World War II.
