= CSS Alabama's Gulf of Mexico expeditionary raid =

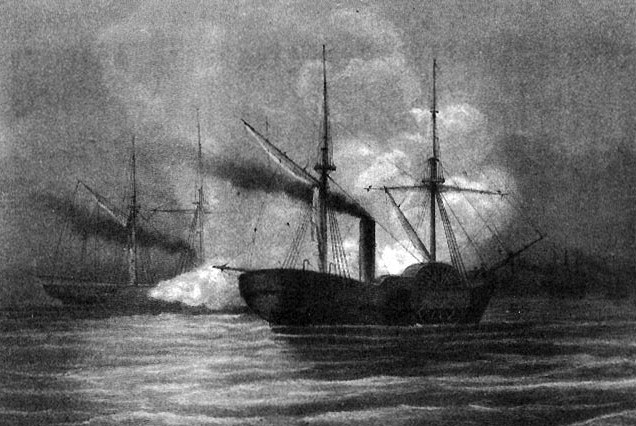
CSS Alabama fighting USS Hatteras.

CSS Alabama's Gulf of Mexico expeditionary raid commenced shortly after the Confederate States Navy ship CSS Alabama left Bermuda and the Atlantic coast and cruised south toward the island of Dominica in the Caribbean Sea near the Gulf of Mexico. The raid lasted from about the middle of November 1862 to the end of January 1863.

The primary area of operation during this expeditionary raid, was the southern seaboard of the United States starting from Dominica then ranging up along Cuba and to Galveston, Texas before finally heading south again toward Jamaica.

== Raid overview ==
CSS Alabama worked its way down the east coast of Florida during the month of November to Martinique to rendezvous with her supply vessel, CSS Agrippina, and ran into USS San Jacinto, narrowly escaping the Union warship. CSS Alabama then made her way to Texas to help defend the state from invasion from General Banks Expedition, and fought USS Hatteras in the action off Galveston Light naval battle, before escaping to the South Atlantic.

From this raiding area off the coast of New England, CSS Alabama made her way into the Caribbean Sea and the Gulf of Mexico to continue her unhindered wrecking of enemy commerce along the North American coastline.

== Raid bounty ==
CSS Alabama's Gulf of Mexico Expeditionary Raid
Date	Ship name	Ship type	Location	Disposition of prize
November 30, 1862	Parker Cooke	Merchant	Near Semana Bay, Dominican Republic	Burned 30 Nov 1862
December 5, 1862	Mina	?		Released on $15,000 ransom bond due to neutral English Cargo
December 7, 1862	Ariel	Merchant	Caribbean Sea	Released on $261,000 bond 9 Dec 1862
January 11, 1863	USS Hatteras	U.S. Navy	Near Galveston, Texas	Sunk by firefight 11 Jan 1863
January 27, 1863	Chastelaine	Brig	Near Jamaica	Burned 27 Jan 1863
January 29, 1863	Golden Rule	?	Near Jamaica	Burned 29 Jan 1863
February 3, 1863	Palmetto	?	27d 18' N; 6d 16' W	Burned 3 Feb 1863
