= John P. Gillis =

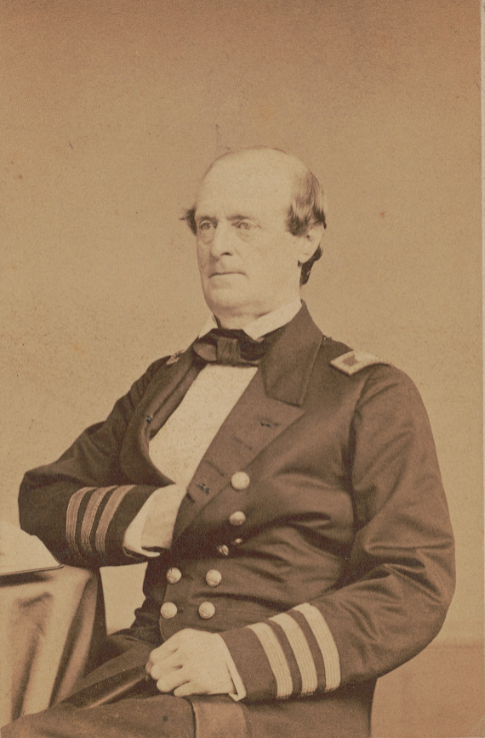
- Born: September 6, 1803; Wilmington, Delaware
- Died: February 25, 1873 (aged 69); Wilmington, Delaware
- Burial place: Wilmington and Brandywine Cemetery
- Military career
- Allegiance: United States of America
- Branch: United States Navy
- Service years: 1825–1866
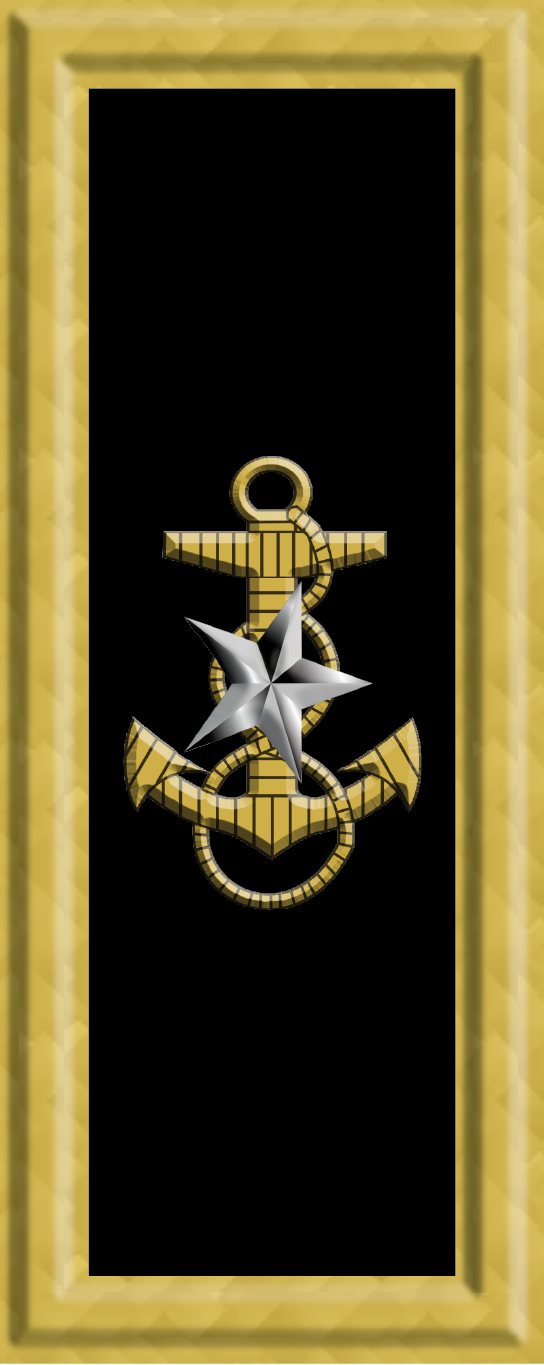
- Rank: Commodore
- Commands: USS Monticello; USS Seminole; USS Ossipee
- Conflicts: Mexican–American War; American Civil War

John Pritchett Gillis (6 September 1803 – 25 February 1873) was a commodore in the United States Navy. He served in the Navy from 1825 until 1866 and saw military action in the Mexican-American War and the U.S. Civil War.

== Biography ==
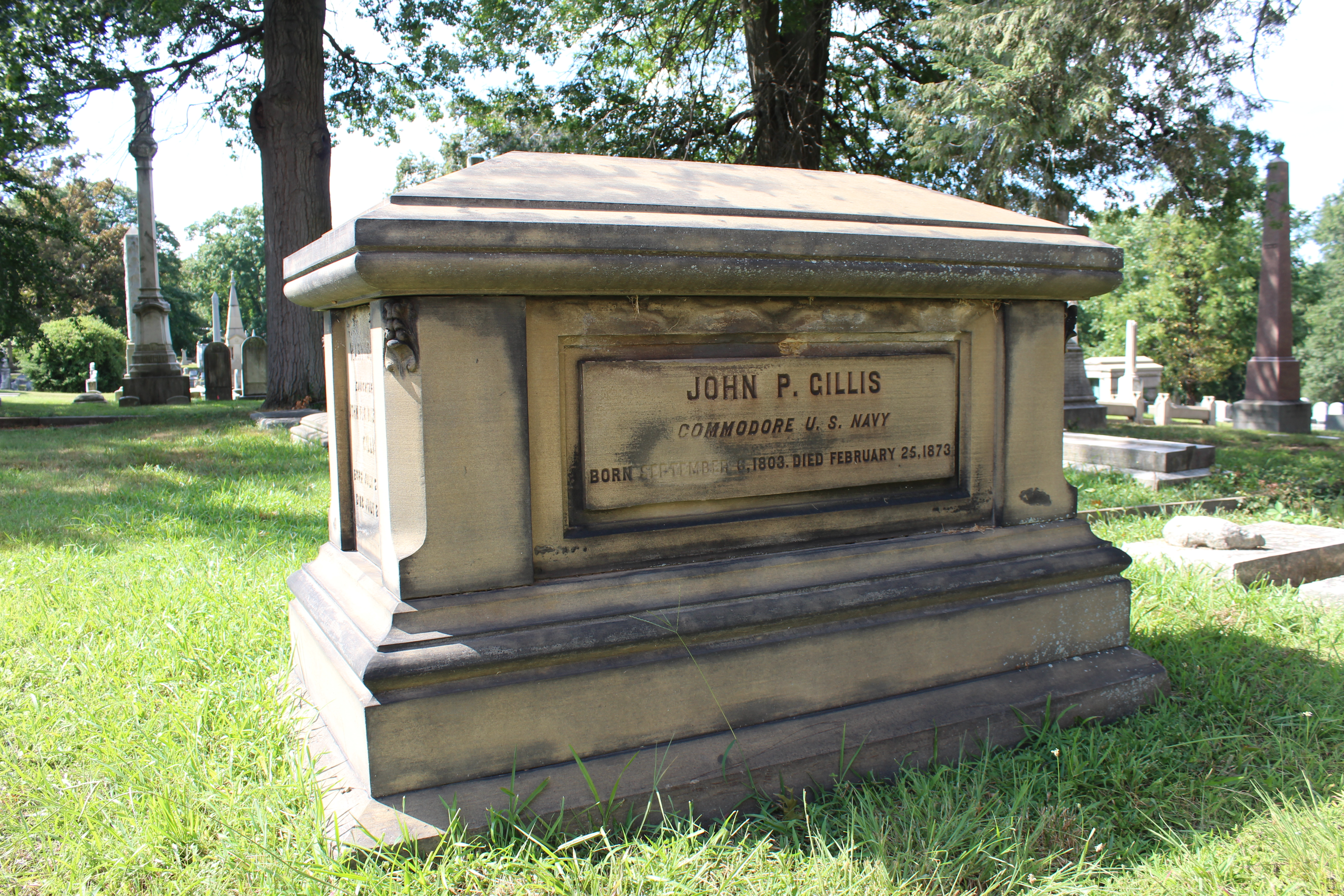
John P. Gillis Memorial in Wilmington and Brandywine Cemetery

Gillis was born in Wilmington, Delaware. As a teenager, he moved to Illinois in 1819 with his family but later came back to Delaware. Gillis was appointed midshipman in 1825 and served on the USS Brandywine. He was promoted to lieutenant in 1837 and his first command was the schooner Albion. He also served on the USS Delaware and the USS Constellation during service on the Mediterranean Sea.

He served with distinction in the Mexican–American War at the capture of Tuxpan. In 1841, he was married to Elizabeth Tatnall. In 1853–54, he sailed with Commodore Matthew C. Perry's expedition to open Japan to the West. He was promoted to commander in 1855.

During the U.S. Civil War, he served as captain of the Pocahontas and rescued Major Robert Anderson and Union troops after the bombardment of Fort Sumter. In 1861, he served in the Atlantic Blockading Squadron, was cited for bravery at the Battle of Port Royal and at the Battle of Hatteras Inlet and he was promoted to captain.

In 1862 and 1863, he served in the Gulf of Mexico as part of the Gulf Blockading Squadron of the Union blockade to prevent the movement of confederate ships. He commanded the USS Monticello, USS Seminole and USS Ossipee and captured blockade runners off Mobile Bay and Texas. He fell severely ill in 1864, took medical leave and saw no more action in the Civil War.

Gillis was a charter member of the Historical Society of Delaware in 1864 and donated many of his personal items collected over years of Navy service.

After the death of Admiral Samuel Francis DuPont in 1865, Gillis became the highest-ranking military officer from Delaware.

He completed his career serving at the New York and Philadelphia Navy Yards and was promoted to commodore before his retirement in 1866. He was a member of the Pennsylvania Commandery of the Military Order of the Loyal Legion of the United States and was assigned insignia number 267.

Commodore Gillis died on February 25, 1873, in Wilmington and is interred in the Wilmington and Brandywine Cemetery.

== Namesake ==
The destroyer USS Gillis (DD-260) was named for him and Commodore James Henry Gillis.
