= USS Eutaw =

Gunboat of the United States Navy

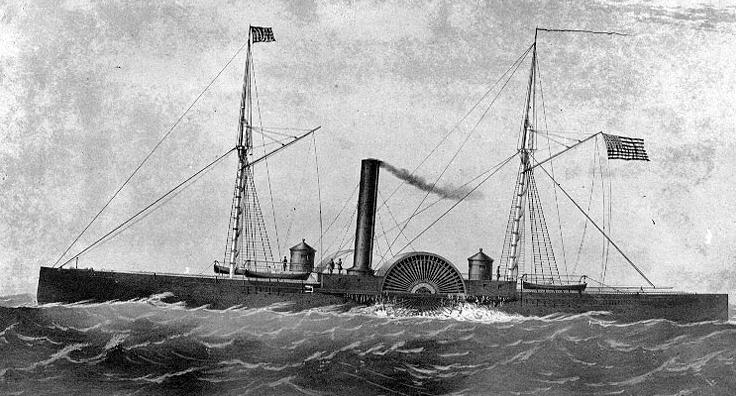
- A lithograph of the USS Eutaw

History

United States
- Name: USS Eutaw
- Builder: J. J. Abrahams, Baltimore, Maryland
- Launched: February 1863
- Commissioned: 2 July 1863
- Decommissioned: 8 May 1865
- Fate: Sold, 15 October 1867

General characteristics
- Class & type: Sassacus-class gunboat
- Type: Steam gunboat
- Displacement: 1,173 long tons (1,192 t)
- Length: 205 ft (62 m)
- Beam: 35 ft (11 m)
- Draft: 8 ft 6 in (2.59 m)
- Propulsion: Steam engine
- Speed: 10 kn (12 mph; 19 km/h)
- Complement: 135 officers and enlisted
- Armament: 4 × 9 in (230 mm) smoothbore guns, 2 × 100-pounder rifled guns, 2 × 20-pounder rifled guns

USS Eutaw was a 1,173 long tons (1,192 t) Sassacus-class "double-ender" steam gunboat built at Baltimore, Maryland by J. J. Abrahams. It was commissioned on 2 July 1863, Lieutenant Commander Homer C. Blake in command.

== Service history ==
Assigned to the North Atlantic Blockading Squadron, USS Eutaw spent most of the American Civil War operating on the Potomac and James Rivers and along the Atlantic coast. On 4–5 May 1864, she covered the Army as it landed below City Point, Virginia; and on 14 July and 17 July, bombarded the Confederates at Malvern Hill. On 5 July, with Augusta, she towed the ill-fated monitor Tecumseh from Hampton Roads to the Gulf of Mexico, returning to the James River on 22 August.

In 1865, with the war nearly at an end, Eutaw went to New York City on 26 April, where she was decommissioned on 8 May and sold on 15 October 1867.
