= Sinking of Petrel =

- Part of the American Civil War
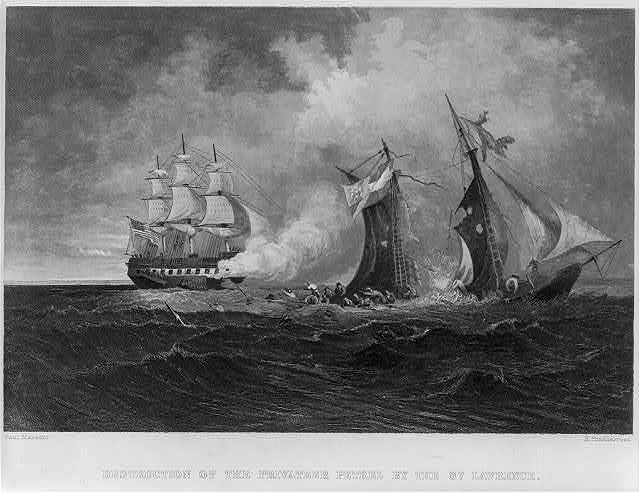
- "Destruction of the privateer Petrel by the St. Lawrence."
Date	July 28, 1861
Location	off Charleston, South Carolina, Atlantic Ocean
Result	United States victory

Belligerents
United States	(Confederate States of America) Confederate States

Commanders and leaders
Hugh Y. Purviance	William Perry

Strength
1 frigate	1 schooner

Casualties and losses
~1 wounded 1 frigate damaged	4 killed 36 captured 1 schooner sunk

The Sinking of Petrel occurred in July 1861 during the American Civil War. While cruising off the coast of South Carolina the United States Navy warship USS St. Lawrence encountered a Confederate privateer named Petrel. The engagement ended in a Union victory and the surviving Confederates were arrested for piracy.

== Background ==
USS St. Lawrence was a sailing frigate built for the Mexican War, she displaced 1,176 long tons (1,195 t) and was armed with fifty guns. Captain Hugh Y. Purviance was placed in command with orders to proceed south along the coast for service with the North Atlantic Blockading Squadron. Her opponent, Petrel, was a much smaller schooner-rigged vessel, mounting only two guns and under the command of Captain William Perry. She was formerly the United States Revenue Cutter Service ship William Aiken until being captured by the Confederates. Petrel had a very short career before she was destroyed, having been commissioned at Charleston, South Carolina on July 10, with seven other vessels. Petrel had a crew of fewer than fifty crewmen while St. Lawrence carried nearly 500 into battle, she left Charleston on July 28 and was discovered on the same date. It was night on July 28 when lookouts informed Captain Purviance that they had sighted a ship flying British colors off the South Carolina coast. Though the Union men did not know it at the time, the ship they saw was Petrel.

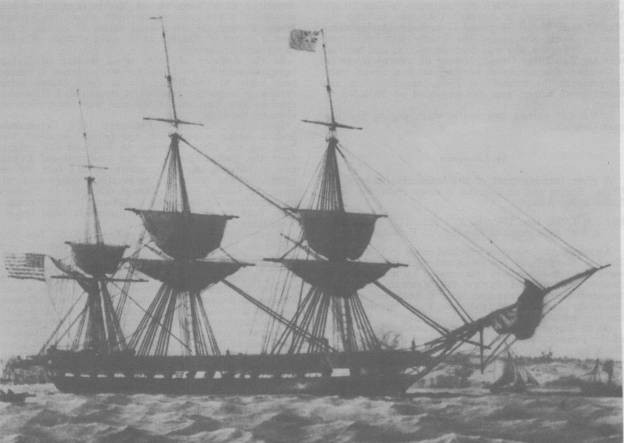
USS St. Lawrence

== Sinking ==
A chase began and continued for around four hours before the Confederates were overhauled. Some accounts say USS St. Lawrence was disguised as a merchantman during the engagement which successfully lured Petrel in for an attack, but at some point Captain Perry discovered the true nature of the Union frigate and he decided to flee as fast as he could. When it became apparent that an escape was impossible, the privateer raised their naval jack and opened fire on St. Lawrence with the 32-pounder gun. After three shots the Union sailors responded with a salvo from their forecastle battery and hit the schooner twice in the hull. For about twenty minutes the two sides exchanged fire until Perry gave the order enter lifeboats and abandon ship. Thirty minutes later Petrel was completely underwater with multiple shot-holes through her side. USS St. Lawrence received some damage to her sails and rigging, though it was only slight and the ship was easily repaired, at least one man suffered from minor wounds. Thirty-six Confederates were taken prisoner and another four men went down with their vessel. The surviving Confederate sailors were eventually sent to Philadelphia in the steamship USS Flag to be charged for piracy but the accusation was not justified and the sailors were taken to Moyamensing Prison for the duration of the war.

== See also ==
- Action off Galveston Light
- Battle of Cherbourg (1864)
- Bahia Incident
- Single ship action
- James Henry Gillis
- Frederick Pearson (Alaska)
