= Frederick Pearson (U.S. Navy officer) =

U.S. Navy officer

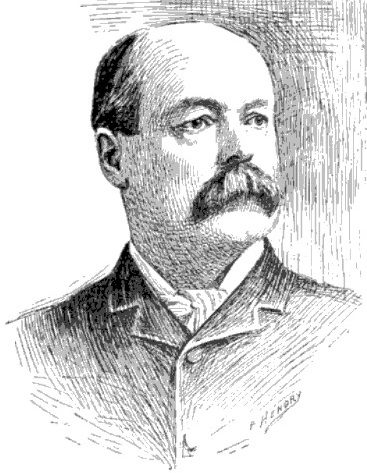
From New England Magazine, October 1905

Frederick Pearson (22 December 1842 – 23 December 1890) was an officer in the United States Navy who served as the commander of the Department of Alaska from March 13, 1882, to October 3, 1882, and as commander of USS Wachusett. during the American Civil War.

Pearson originally attended US Naval Academy from 1859 to 1861, but left to join the Navy at the start of the American Civil War. He was on USS St. Lawrence when she engaged the rebel privateer Petrel on July 28, 1861. He was commissioned as an ensign in September 1862, and retired with the rank of commander in October 1885. He died from heart problems the day after his 48th birthday.

== Notes ==
- Hamersly, Lewis R. (1878). "The records of living officers of the U.S. navy & Marine corps: compiled from official sources". Lippincott Publishing.
