= Action off Galveston Light =

Naval battle of the American Civil War

Coordinates: 29.319931°N 94.657173°W

- Part of the American Civil War, Gulf of Mexico Raid
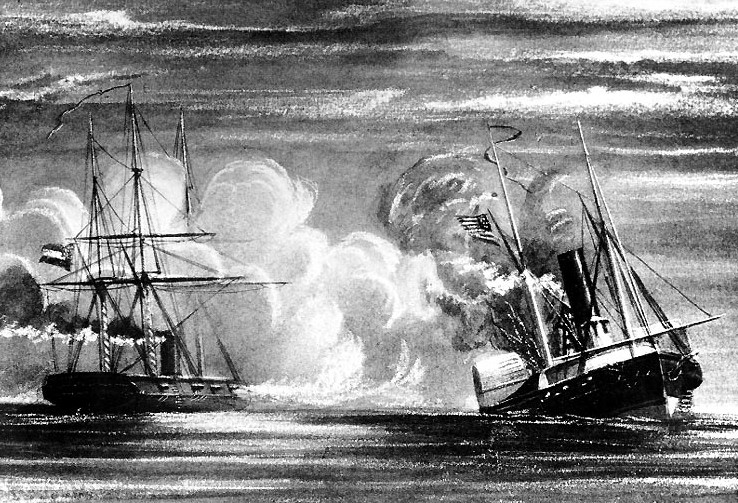
- 19th century print, depicting the sinking of Hatteras by CSS Alabama, off Galveston, Texas, 11 January 1863
Date	January 11, 1863
Location	off Galveston Lighthouse, Texas, Gulf of Mexico
Result	Confederate victory

Belligerents
United States (Union)	(Confederate States of America) CSA (Confederacy)

Commanders and leaders
Homer C. Blake	Raphael Semmes

Strength
1 steamer	1 sloop-of-war

Casualties and losses
2 killed 5 wounded 118 captured 1 steamer sunk	2 wounded 1 sloop-of-war damaged

The action off Galveston Light was a short naval battle fought during the American Civil War in January 1863. Confederate raider CSS Alabama encountered and sank the United States Navy steamer USS Hatteras off Galveston Lighthouse in Texas.

== Background ==
USS Hatteras of 1,126 long tons (1,144 t) was commanded by Captain Homer C. Blake and was assigned to the West Gulf Blockading Squadron off Galveston, Texas. The steamer had a crew of 126 officers and men and was armed with four 32-pounders and one 20-pounder naval gun. Captain Raphael Semmes commanded the 1,050-ton sloop-of-war CSS Alabama which carried 145 officers and men with six 32-pounders, one 110-pounder and one 68-pounder gun. The encounter between the two vessels was the first combat action of Alabama's distinguished career.

== Action ==
At about 3:00 pm on January 11, 1863, Hatteras was on blockade duty with USS Brooklyn and five other vessels off Galveston when a sail was sighted above the horizon. Captain Blake was then ordered to chase the unidentified ship in Hatteras and to capture the vessel if it proved to be an enemy. The ship was Alabama and she could not escape. After pursuing Alabama until nightfall just over twenty miles of sea from Galveston Harbor to a position off Galveston Light, Hatteras came alongside of the Confederate ship and demanded that the crew identify themselves. The Confederates called out HMS Spitfire to try to confuse the Union sailors so Captain Blake ordered a boat to be filled with sailors and lowered for a boarding. But just as the launch shoved off the Confederates shouted "We're the CSS Alabama", raised their colors, and opened fire with a heavy broadside on the portside of the Union vessel.

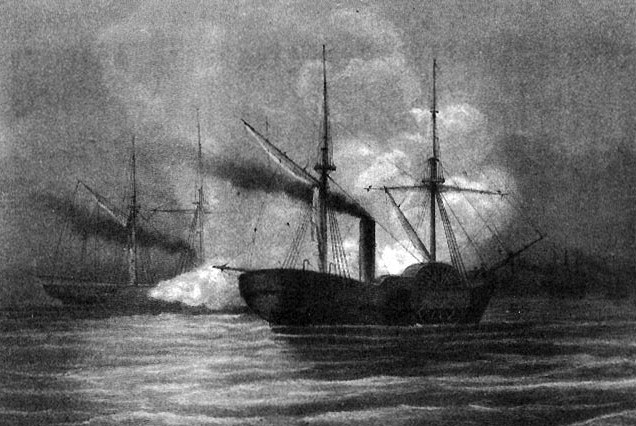
In action with CSS Alabama, off Galveston, Texas, on 11 January 1863

The men aboard Hatteras were surprised but returned fire with their much smaller broadside. For thirteen minutes the two sides dueled in what Captain Semmes later called a "sharp and exiting" engagement. In the end, crewmen aboard USS Hatteras fired a signal gun to announce their defeat, Hatteras was slowly sinking and Captain Blake ordered the magazines flooded to prevent an explosion. Men began jumping into the water and boats from Alabama were lowered to provide assistance. At the same time a boat with six Union sailors escaped along the coast and evaded the Confederates who were maneuvering to rescue survivors. Two United States Navy enlisted men were killed in action, five were wounded and another 118 taken prisoner. CSS Alabama sustained several shot holes and other damage but Captain Semmes reported that none of it was serious and prevented the vessel from sailing. Two Confederate Navy sailors were wounded.

== Aftermath ==
After sinking the Union steamer the Confederates sailed for the South Atlantic, they were chased unsuccessfully by some of the Galveston blockaders but no further fighting occurred. Eventually Semmes made his way to Cherbourg-en-Cotentin, France where his ship was destroyed by USS Kearsarge in another significant battle. USS Brooklyn discovered the wreck of USS Hatteras the following morning and found that she was resting on the bottom in nine and a half fathoms with only her masts sticking out above the waterline. Her colors were not struck in the battle and were still waving in the breeze when Brooklyn arrived.

== See also ==
- Bahia Incident
- Single ship action
- Sinking of Petrel
