= James Henry Gillis =

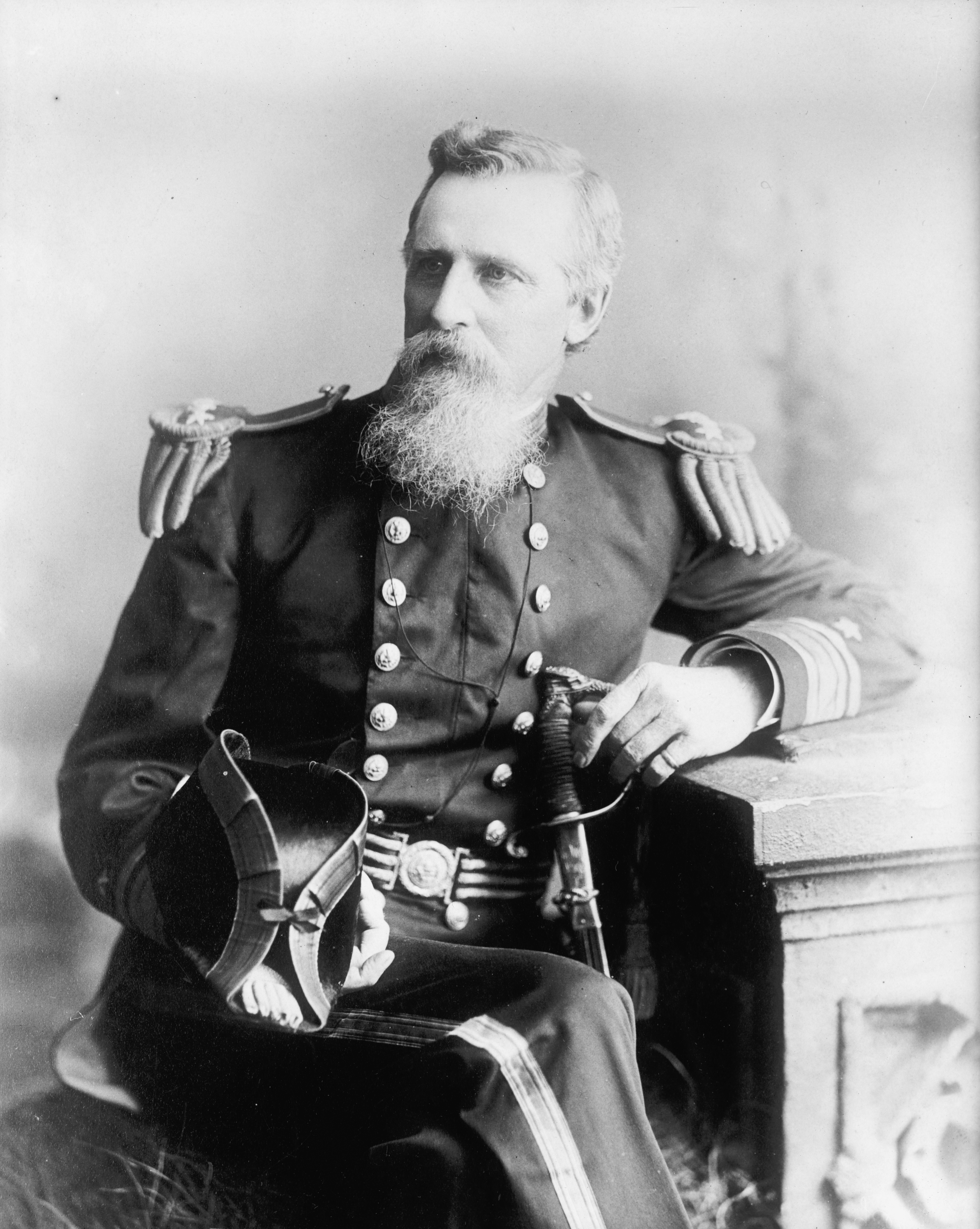
- Born: James Henry Lawrence Gillis; May 14, 1831; Ridgway, Pennsylvania, U.S.
- Died: December 6, 1910 (aged 79); Melbourne Beach, Florida, U.S.
- Military career
- Allegiance: United States of America
- Branch: United States Navy
- Service years: 1854–1893
- Rank: Rear Admiral (Acting); Commodore
- Commands: USS Michigan; USS Franklin; USS Lackawanna; USS Minnesota; USS Hartford
- Conflicts: American Civil War: Sinking of the Petrel

James Henry Gillis (14 May 1831 – 6 December 1910) was a rear admiral in the United States Navy. His active-duty career extended from the 1850s through the 1890s, including service in the American Civil War.

== Biography ==
Born in Ridgway, Pennsylvania, Gillis was the son of U.S. Congressman James L. Gillis and his second wife Cecelia Ann Berray. He graduated from the Naval Academy in 1854. Three years later, while serving in store ship Supply, Gillis rescued the crew of a foundered Argentine ship during a violent storm.

During the Civil War he served with Union Squadrons blockading the Confederacy, and subsequently commanded Michigan, Franklin, the flagship of the European Squadron, Lackawanna, Minnesota, and Hartford, the flagship of the Pacific Squadron.

Gillis served on the frigate USS St. Lawrence at the beginning of the Civil War, he participated in the defeat of the rebel privateer Petrel on July 28, 1861 off South Carolina.

After the Civil War, he became a member of the District of Columbia Commandery of the Military Order of the Loyal Legion of the United States.

He was promoted to the rank of captain in September 1876 and to commodore in January 1887.

He commanded the South Atlantic Squadron from 1888 to 1890. During this assignment he held the rank of acting rear admiral.

Commodore Gillis retired from the Navy on 14 May 1893, having reached the mandatory retirement age of 62. He was known as the "Sailor with a charmed life" because he never lost a man at sea.

Rear Admiral Gillis died at Melbourne Beach, Florida at the age of 79. He was interred at Arlington National Cemetery, where his tombstone bears his final active-duty rank of commodore.

== Namesake ==
The destroyer USS Gillis (DD-260) was named for him and Commodore John P. Gillis.

== Dates of rank ==
- Midshipman, 12 October 1848.
- Passed Midshipman, 15 June 1854.
- Master, 16 September 1855.
- Lieutenant, 17 September 1855.
- Lieutenant Commander, 16 July 1862.
- Commander, 25 July 1866.
- Captain, 30 September 1876.
- Commodore, 29 January 1887.
- Retired List, 14 May 1893.
