= USCS Morris =

History

United States
- Name: Morris
- Acquired: 1849
- Commissioned: 1849
- Decommissioned: 1855
- Notes: Sank in 1853, but raised and repaired

General characteristics
- Type: Survey ship (schooner)
- Length: 91.6 ft (27.9 m)
- Beam: 22.6 ft (6.9 m)
- Draft: 4.6 ft (1.4 m)
- Propulsion: Sails
- Sail plan: Schooner-rigged

The USCS Morris was a schooner that served as a survey ship in the United States Coast Survey from 1849 to 1855.

The Coast Survey acquired Morris from the United States Army Quartermaster Department in 1849 and placed her in service that year along the United States Gulf Coast, where she spent her entire Coast Survey career.

In 1852, a member of Morris's crew–Daniel L. Bryan, M.D., past Assistant Surgeon, United States Navy–died of disease at Pensacola, Florida, while voluntarily attending the sick during an epidemic on the U.S. Gulf Coast. His sacrifice was noted as one of great heroism.

Morris sank in Pensacola Harbor at Pensacola during a gale at the end of the 1853 surveying season, but she was raised and returned to service. She was retired in 1855.
