= USS Hatteras (1861) =

Union Navy ship

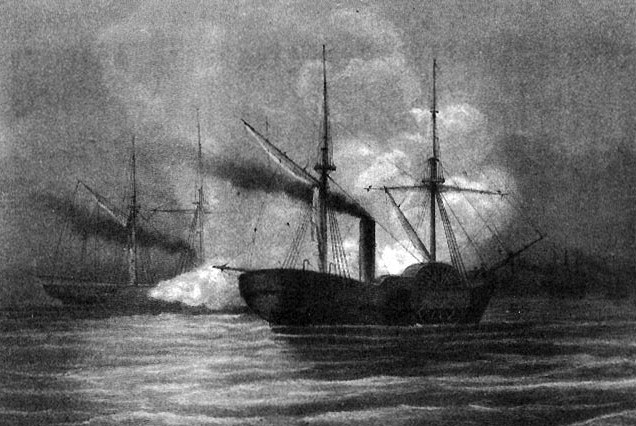
- USS Hatteras in action with CSS Alabama, off Galveston, Texas, on 11 January 1863

History

United States
- Name: USS Hatteras
- Namesake: An inlet on the coast of North Carolina
- Builder: Harlan and Hollingsworth, Wilmington, Delaware
- Laid down: date unknown
- Launched: date unknown
- Acquired: 25 September 1861
- Commissioned: October 1861 at the Philadelphia Navy Yard
- Out of service: 11 January 1863
- Stricken: 1863 (est.)
- Fate: Sunk in action, 11 January 1863
- Notes: formerly known as St. Mary

General characteristics
- Type: Steamer
- Displacement: 1,126 long tons (1,144 t)
- Length: 210 ft (64 m)
- Beam: 18 ft (5.5 m)
- Installed power: 500 ihp (370 kW)
- Propulsion: Steam engine; 2 × iron sidewheels
- Speed: 8 kn (9.2 mph; 15 km/h)
- Complement: 126
- Armament: 4 × 32 pdr (15 kg) guns, 1 × 20 pdr (9.1 kg) gun
- USS Hatteras (41GV68)
- U.S. National Register of Historic Places
- Location: Address restricted
- Nearest city: Galveston, Texas
- Area: less than one acre
- NRHP reference No.: 77001567
- Added to NRHP: 28 January 1977

The first USS Hatteras was a 1,126-ton iron-hulled steamer purchased by the Union Navy at the beginning of the American Civil War. She was outfitted as a gunboat and assigned to the Union blockade of the ports and waterways of the Confederate States of America. During an engagement with the disguised Confederate commerce raider, CSS Alabama, she was taken by surprise and was sunk off the coast of Galveston, Texas. The wreck site is one of the few listed on the National Register of Historic Places because of its location away from destructive surf and because of the ship's side-wheel design, which marks the transition between wooden sailing ships and steam-powered ships.

Hatteras (formerly St. Mary) was purchased by the U. S. Navy from Harlan and Hollingsworth of Wilmington, Delaware on 25 September 1861. She was fitted out at the Philadelphia Navy Yard and commissioned in October 1861, Commander George F. Emmons in command.

== Civil War service ==
Hatteras sailed for Key West, Florida on 5 November 1861, arriving there on 13 November to join the South Atlantic Blockading Squadron to choke off the South's economic lifeline as part of president Lincoln's Anaconda Plan. After blockade duty off Apalachicola, Florida, she was reassigned to Cedar Key, Florida, reaching there on 7 January 1862. Nine days later, Hatteras made a highly successful raid on the Cedar Keys harbor, burning seven small would-be blockade runners loaded with turpentine and cotton at the Florida Railroad wharf (an important Southern railroad terminus), several flat-cars, and various buildings.

To cap this day's work, Hatteras also captured 14 of the 22-man garrison stationed there, including their commanding officer. Such unceasing attack from the sea on any point along her long coastline and inland waterways cost the South dearly in losses, economic disruption, and dispersion of defense strength.

After this exploit, Hatteras was transferred to the Gulf Blockading Squadron and arrived off Berwick, Louisiana on 26 January. The next day, she engaged CSS Mobile, but failed to do any serious damage when the light-draft ship withdrew to the safety of shallow water.

Nevertheless, the Gulf of Mexico proved to be a profitable hunting ground for Hatteras, as in less than a year, she captured seven blockade runners with assorted cargos of cotton, sugar, and other goods the South was desperately striving to export for gold or much needed trade goods. These captures netted Hatteras, among other things, some 534 bales of valuable cotton. Commander Emmons stationed four of his own men on board one prize ship, 20 long tons (20 t) the sloop Poody, and rechristened her Hatteras Jr., turning the erstwhile blockade runner into a unit of the Union's Gulf Blockading Squadron.

Other Confederate ships taken by Hatteras as prizes included: steamer Indian No. 2, schooner Magnolia, steamer Governor A. Mouton, schooner Sarah, sloop Elizabeth, and brig Josephine. The majority of these ships were captured off Vermilion Bay, Louisiana, as they ran toward either Havana, Cuba, or the Sabine River area of Texas.

However, her illustrious career was cut short in early 1863, not long after she was ordered to join the blockading squadron under Rear Admiral David Farragut, who was attempting to retake the key Texas port of Galveston. Under a new skipper, Commander Homer C. Blake, who had relieved Captain Emmons in November 1862, Hatteras joined Farragut's squadron off Galveston on 6 January 1863.

=== Encounter with the CSS Alabama ===
As the blockading fleet lay to off the coast near Galveston on the afternoon of 11 January 1863, a set of sails was sighted just over the horizon and Hatteras was ordered to give chase. She took off in pursuit of the unknown ship at about 15:00 (3:00 PM), and for the next four hours followed as the Confederate raider lured the Hatteras further and further from the shore. Finally, as dusk was falling, Hatteras came within hailing distance of the square-rigged ship. Commander Blake demanded her identity. The Confederates identified themselves as the British gunvessel HMS Spitfire. Still suspicious, Blake ordered one of Hatteras' boats to inspect this "Britisher."

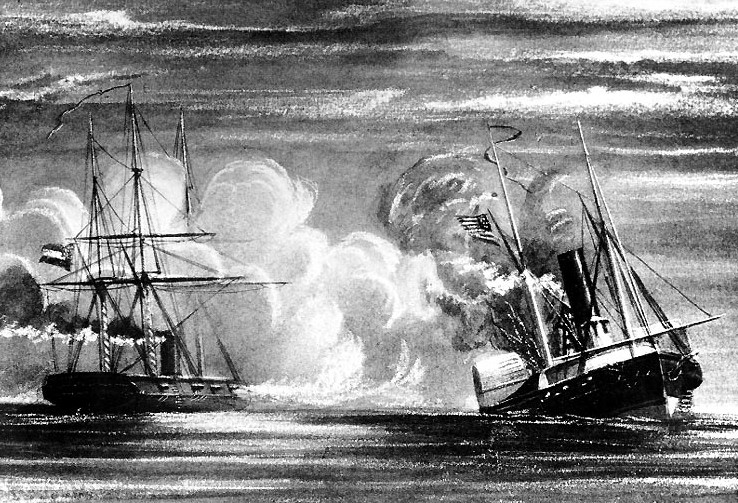
19th century print, depicting the sinking of Hatteras by CSS Alabama, off Galveston, Texas on 11 January 1863.

Scarcely had the longboat pulled away from Hatteras than a new reply to Blake's question rang through the night. "We are the CSS Alabama." With this, the famed Confederate raider commanded by Raphael Semmes struck the Union Jack the raider had been flying, raising the Confederate Stars and Bars, and began raking Hatteras with her heavy cannon. Through the gloom, for about 20 minutes, the two ships exchanged heavy fire at distances ranging from 25–200 yd (23–183 m). The flashes of the guns and their rumbling were heard in the Union squadron some 16 mi (26 km) away, and the cruiser Brooklyn was dispatched to investigate and render aid if needed.

But Hatteras had already been badly holed in two places and was on fire and beginning to sink. Captain Blake ordered the magazines flooded to prevent explosion and reluctantly fired a single bow gun, indicating surrender and a need for assistance. Alabama, promptly sent over her boats to help remove Hatteras' crew and wounded, and the last boatload of men had barely pulled away when the Union blockader sank, some 45 minutes after the beginning of the action.

Of Hatteras' crew of 126, two had been killed and five wounded. Six escaped back to the squadron in the boat originally sent out to board and investigate "HMS Petrel", and the remainder, including Captain Blake, were taken to Port Royal, Jamaica, and from there paroled back to the United States; Alabama suffered only two wounded.

When Brooklyn reached the site of the battle early the following morning, she found the hulk of Hatteras upright in the water about 20 mi (32 km) south of Galveston Light. Only Hatteras' masts reached out of water, and from the topmast the U.S. Navy commissioning pennant was still waving in the breeze. Even after surrendering, she had not struck her colors.

== Present day ==
The hull of Hatteras rests in approximately 60 ft (18 m) of water 20 mi (32 km) off of Galveston, Texas and is buried under about 3 ft (0.91 m) of sand. Her steam engine and two iron paddle wheels remain on the ocean bottom. The wreck is monitored to ensure that it is not damaged by oil and gas development in the area.

The wreck of Hatteras is the property of the United States Navy, though the Texas Historical Commission, Texas A&M University at Galveston and the federal Minerals Management Service (now Bureau of Ocean Energy Management) cooperate in preserving the important historical site.

At one time, local treasure hunters filed suit claiming the right to salvage the ship, but the courts found in favor of the United States government, in one of the few times courts have ruled in favor of historic preservation of a shipwreck site versus commercial interests.

The Alabama Hills are named in honor of the CSS Alabama. Sahagun, Louis (20 June 2020). "A Confederate warship haunts California's Alabama Hills National Scenic Area". Los Angeles Times.

== See also ==
- National Register of Historic Places listings in Galveston County, Texas
- Union Navy
- Confederate States Navy

== Attribution ==
- This article contains public domain material from the Naval Historical Center.
