= CSS Fredericksburg =

American Civil War Confederate ironclad

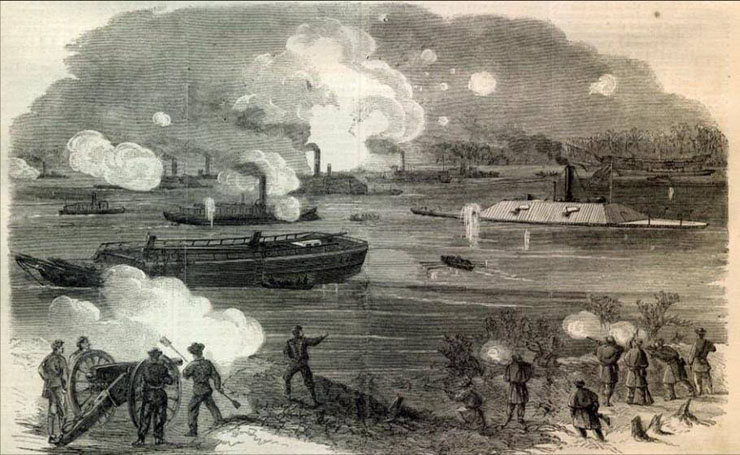
- Fredericksburg (far right) during the Battle of Trent's Reach in 1865

History

Confederate States
- Name: Fredericksburg
- Namesake: Fredericksburg, Virginia
- Operator: Confederate States Navy
- Laid down: 1862
- Launched: June 11, 1863
- Commissioned: March 1864
- Fate: Destroyed to prevent capture, April 3, 1865

General characteristics
- Type: Casemate ironclad
- Tonnage: 700
- Length: 188 ft (57.3 m) (o/a); 170 feet (51.8 m) (p/p)
- Beam: 40 ft 3 in (12.27 m)
- Draft: 9–10 ft (2.7–3.0 m) or 13 ft 6 in (4.11 m)
- Depth: 9 ft (2.7 m)
- Installed power: 3 × boilers
- Propulsion: 2 × shafts; 2 × direct-action steam engines
- Speed: 5 knots (9.3 km/h; 5.8 mph)
- Complement: 150 officers and men; 20 to 25 marines
- Armament: 1 × 7 in (178 mm) Brooke rifle; 2 × 6.4 in (163 mm) Brooke rifles; 1 × 10 in (254 mm) Columbiad

CSS (Note: Confederate States Ship.) Fredericksburg was a casemate ironclad that served as part of the James River Squadron of the Confederate States Navy during the American Civil War. Laid down in 1862 and launched the following year, she did not see action until 1864 due to delays in receiving her armor and guns. After passing through the obstructions at Drewry's Bluff in May 1864, she participated in several minor actions on the James River and fought in the Battle of Chaffin's Farm from September 29 to October 1. On January 23 and 24, 1865, she was part of the Confederate fleet at the Battle of Trent's Reach, and was one of only two Confederate ships to make it past the obstructions at Trent's Reach. After the Confederate attack failed, Fredericksburg withdrew with the rest of the James River Squadron. On April 3, as the Confederates were abandoning Richmond, Fredericksburg and the other vessels of the James River Squadron were burned. Her wreck was located in the 1980s, buried under sediment.

== Background and description ==
In mid-1862, Fredericksburg was laid down by the Confederate States Navy in the Rocketts Landing area of Richmond, Virginia to a plan by the Chief Naval Constructor, John L. Porter. The ship was one of the ironclads built to Porter's shallow-draft "diamond hull" configuration with a flat bottom and hull sides that met the base of the casemate at a 90° angle. By substituting straight lines and angles for the traditional keel and curving frame of the hull, Porter optimized his design to be quickly built by ordinary carpenters, rather than highly skilled shipwrights that were in short supply in the Confederacy, at the cost of being able to mount fewer guns than those ironclads built with traditional hulls. Their shallow draft and flat bottom restricted these ships to rivers and inland waters.

Porter supervised the work of constructing Fredericksburg, but it is uncertain how exactly he followed his design as surviving documents disagree in many ways. The plan showed an overall length of 188 feet (57.3 m) and a length between perpendiculars of 170 feet (51.8 m) with a maximum beam of 40 feet 3 inches (12.3 m), a moulded beam of 34 feet (10.4 m) and a depth of hold of 9 ft (2.7 m). The naval historian Saxon T. Bisbee quotes a beam of 40 feet (12.2 m) with a depth of hold of 10 feet 10 inches (3.30 m) and a draft of 9 to 10 feet (2.7 to 3.0 m) while US Navy historian Paul J. Marcello provides a figure of 13 feet 6 inches (4.11 m) for the ironclad's draft. She had a tonnage of 700 long tons. (Note: No surviving document specifies the exact type of tonnage for Fredericksburg.) The ship's casemate was shaped like a rectangle and Porter's plan showed two pilothouses on the casemate's roof, although operational reports from her captain make no mention of the rear pilothouse.

The Tredegar Iron Works in Richmond was contracted to produce her propulsion system, although Bisbee believes that it is possible that the Richmond-based Shockoe Foundry may have produced them. The ship was propelled by a pair of 24-inch-diameter (61 cm) direct-acting steam engines that each drove a 7-foot (2.1 m) propeller. Porter's plan shows Fredericksburg as having three horizontal boilers measuring 7 feet tall, 5 feet (1.5 m) in diameter, and 15 feet (4.6 m) long, but it is not known if the final construction varied from the blueprints or not. Bisbee believes that the boilers probably were of the fire-tube type. Fredericksburg could move at a speed of about 5 knots (9.3 km/h; 5.8 mph) and had a crew of 150. She also carried about 20 to 25 Confederate States Marines in case of a battle that required naval boarding.

Fredericksburg eventually received her armament of one 7-inch (178 mm) Brooke rifle on a pivot mount in the bow, two 6.4-inch (163 mm) Brooke rifles, one on each broadside and a 10-inch (25.4 cm) Columbiad muzzle-loading smoothbore gun on a pivot mounting in the stern. Naval historian Paul H. Silverstone states that she was armed with one 11-inch (27.9 cm) smoothbore cannon, an 8-inch (20.3 cm) rifled cannon, and two 6.4-inch (16.3 cm) rifled cannons, and naval historian W. Craig Gaines states that she was armed with four 6-inch (15.2 cm) rifled cannons.

Gaines states that she had 4 inches (10.2 cm) of wrought-iron armor. The area where the casemate met the deck was armored with 2 inches (5.1 cm) of iron, and the armor extended below the waterline. The top of the casemate consisted of 2-inch-thick iron bars, spaced 9 inches (23 cm) apart. After the Battle of Chaffin's Farm in September–October 1864, the ship's captain recommended that additional iron bars be positioned between the bars to better protect the crew, although it is uncertain if this was ever done. Fredericksburg had less armor than Virginia II, which gave her a lighter draft but made her comparatively weaker.

== Construction and career ==
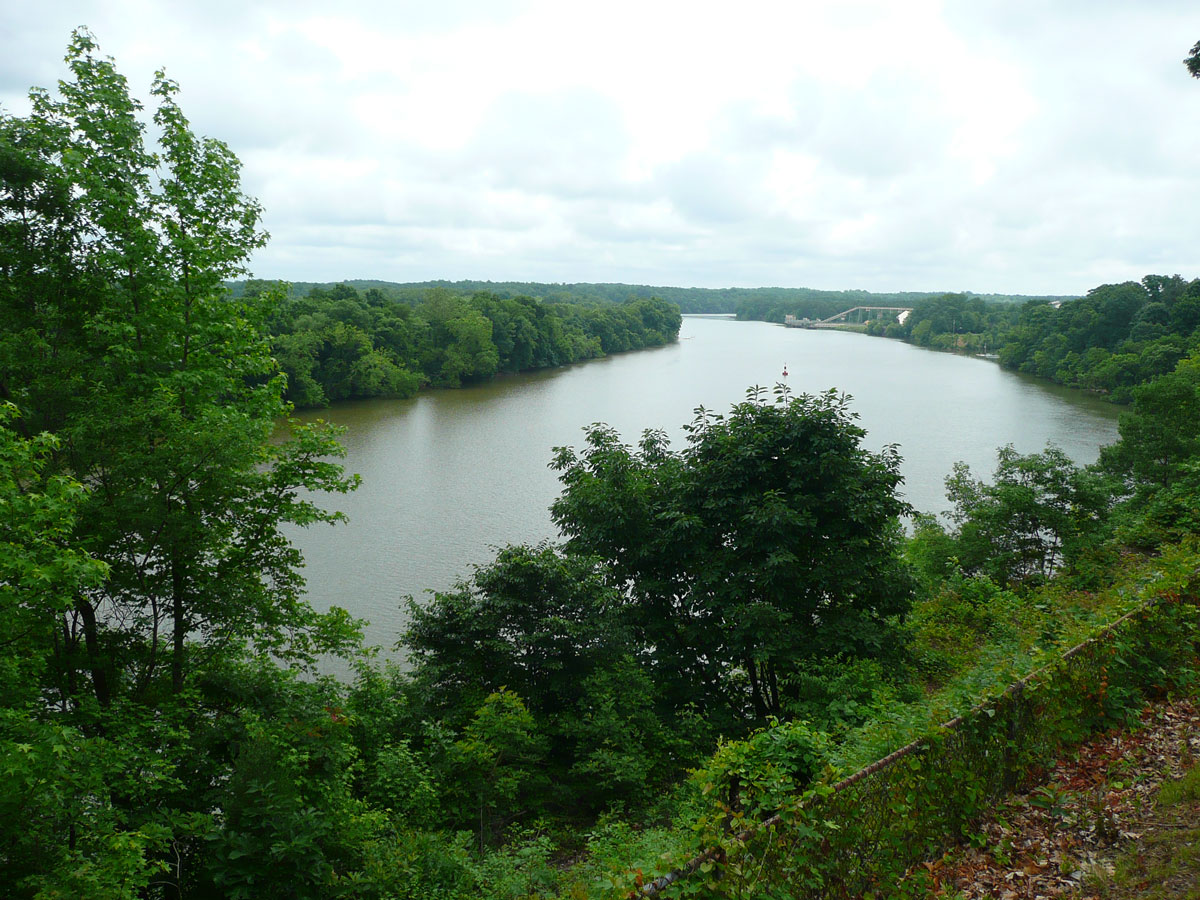
View of the James River from Drewry's Bluff, 2009

Named for the Virginia city, Fredericksburg's construction was partially funded from monies raised by women's organizations for ship construction; the ship was one of several ironclads sometimes known as the "Ladies Gunboats". An attempt to launch the warship on June 6, 1863, failed when the Confederates were unable to get her into the water, but another on June 11 was successful. Her fitting out was prolonged by a lack of iron, which was in short supply in the Confederacy. The shortage led to work on the ironclad CSS Virginia II being delayed until after Fredericksburg was armored, as there was not enough metal available to work on both ships at the same time. The ship was complete, except for her armament by November 30. High waters on the James River in early 1864 threatened to wash away stockpiles of timber and inundate the shipyard's wharves, further delaying her completion.

In March, Fredericksburg was commissioned and taken to Drewry's Bluff on the James River, where she was fitted out, placed under the command of Commander Thomas R. Rootes. She was assigned to the James River Squadron. The James River Squadron had been commanded by Captain French Forrest until May 6, when Captain John K. Mitchell replaced Forrest. As of April 30, Fredericksburg's armament was reported to be close, but not quite, complete, and she was still not fully ready when Mitchell took command. By May 15, she was fully ready for combat.

The vessels of the James River Squadron could not initially move downriver beyond Drewry's Bluff, as the river had been obstructed there in 1862 to prevent Union incursions up the river. Pilings had been driven into the river which was also blocked with stone-filled cribs and blockships. However, in May 1864, the obstructions were partially dismantled to allow for a Confederate offensive against the Union vessels in the James. On May 23, Fredericksburg passed through the remainder of the obstructions, and Virginia II and the ironclad CSS Richmond passed through the next day. General P. G. T. Beauregard placed artillery batteries along the south side of the river to support the naval advance, but Fredericksburg suffered boiler damage on May 29 that required a day to repair. Mitchell was aware that the Union would have strong advantages in a naval battle, and he and his officers declined to attack. Union Lieutenant General Ulysses S. Grant moved across the James as part of an advance against Richmond in June, and established a supply depot at City Point on the James. The primary goal of the Union naval forces on the James became to protect City Point, and to further that goal, five blockships were sunk at Trent's Reach, which was 20 miles (32 km) upriver from City Point.

On June 21, the James River Squadron and a Confederate shore battery known as Battery Dantzler bombarded Union ships stationed at Trent's Reach. The naval fire was at a range of almost 2 miles (3.2 km) and was not effective. Union forces under the command of Major General Benjamin Butler began building the Dutch Gap Canal in August to try to bypass Confederate land defenses in the area. On August 13, Confederate naval forces fired on the Union troops building the canal. Fredericksburg participated in the action, along with Virginia II, Richmond, and the gunboats CSS Drewry, CSS Nansemond, and CSS Hampton. The Confederate vessels fired approximately 147 shots during the engagement, but did little damage. The shooting lasted from 06:00 to 18:00, and about 30 Union soldiers were killed or wounded. Union return fire damaged Fredericksburg's smokestack. Four days later, the three ironclads helped repulse a small Union attack against a Confederate position at Signal Hill, which was the location of a Confederate battery downstream from Drewry's Bluff.

On September 29, Butler's Union Army of the James attacked the Confederate land positions in the Battle of Chaffin's Farm. The three Confederate ironclads were in the area, and were called upon to fire at the Union lines. Union troops took Fort Harrison, but were unable to capture Chaffin's Bluff. The ironclads participated in the fighting from September 29 to October 1. Their fire was effective and they suffered little damage, although a rifled cannon on Fredericksburg burst on September 30. The Union gains on land allowed them to construct a battery known as Fort Brady on the now-captured Signal Hill upriver from Battery Dantzler. While Battery Danztler still controlled part of the river for the Confederates and prevented Union ships from travelling upriver to Fort Brady, the Confederate vessels were unable to move downriver to Battery Danztler. On October 22, while patrolling the river, the James River Squadron was surprised by the presence of a Union shore battery which had been recently constructed upstream from Fort Brady. The three ironclads moved against the battery to allow the wooden gunboats of the fleet to escape, before falling back to Chaffin's Bluff. Fredericksburg suffered minor damage during the engagement, with her smokestack and the roof to her casemate damaged.

=== Trent's Reach ===
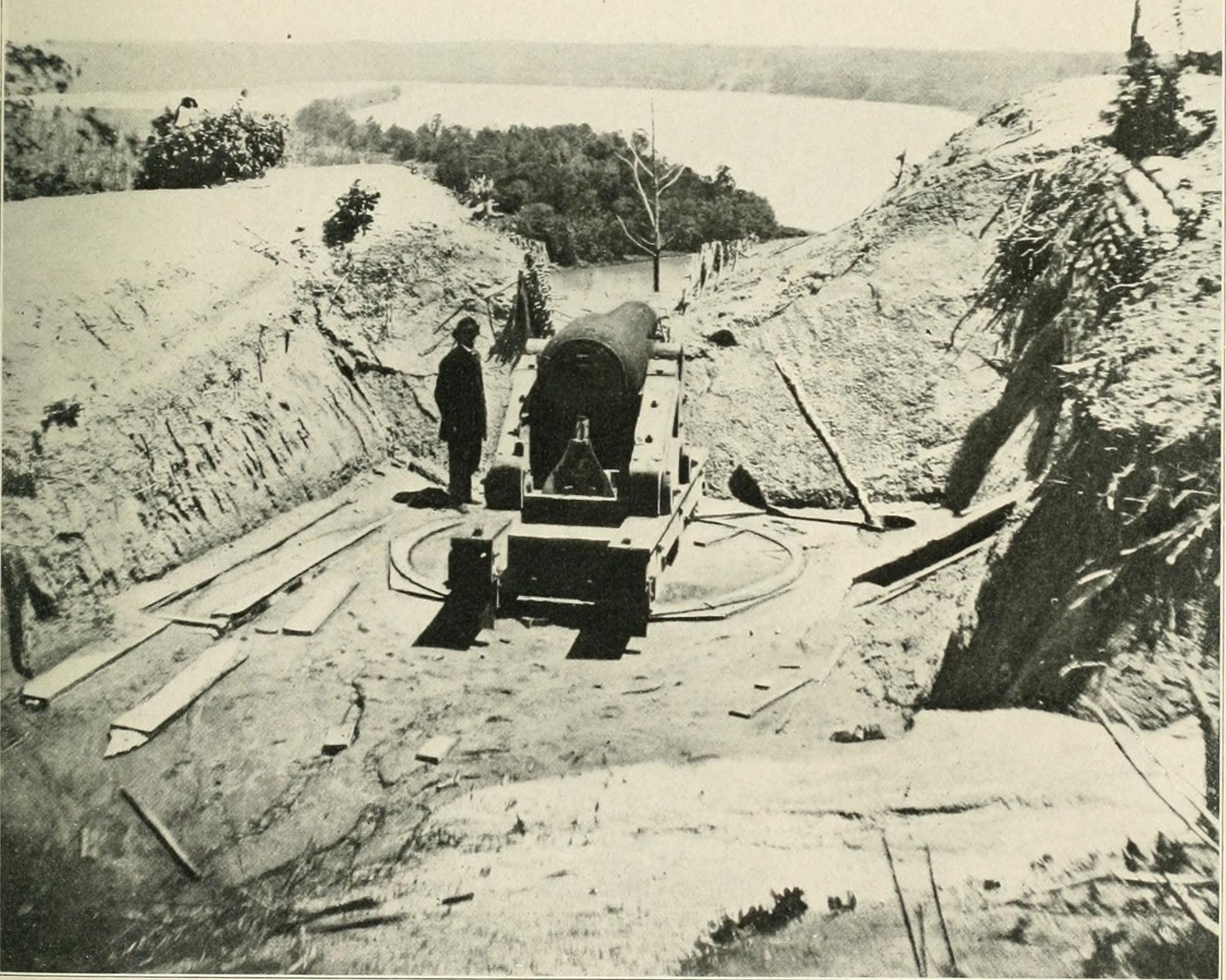
A wartime view from Battery Dantzler

On October 24, Fredericksburg was sent upriver to the Rocketts area, where she was given a replacement cannon for the gun that had burst and had the roof of her casemate protected with iron bars. Fredericksburg, Virginia II, and Richmond went down to Fort Brady on December 7 and exchanged fire with the Union position. Rootes did not command Fredericksburg due to illness from December 1864 until February 1865. Lieutenant Francis E. Shepperd commanded her for a time during December 1864, and from January 14 through 25, 1865. By the beginning of 1865, the situation was becoming bleaker for the Confederates due to several military defeats, and it was decided to risk an attack against the Union fleet on the James in hopes of breaking the blockade on the river and destroying the depot at City Point. The Union obstructions at Trent's Reach had been damaged by high water, and part of the Union fleet had been transferred to North Carolina for operations against Fort Fisher. On the night of January 23/24, the Confederate fleet, composed of Fredericksburg, Richmond, Virginia II, Hampton, Drewry, Nansemond, the gunboats CSS Torpedo and CSS Beaufort, and the torpedo boats CSS Hornet, CSS Wasp, and CSS Scorpion moved downriver towards Trent's Reach. Fredericksburg was in the lead as she had the lightest draft. The ships successfully passed Fort Brady in the darkness, but Torpedo ran aground not long after and had to be abandoned.

Fredericksburg was able to cross the Union obstructions at Trent's Reach at about 01:30 on January 24, but suffered hull damage during the process. The damage caused the ship to spring a leak. While Hampton also passed the obstructions, none of the other Confederate ironclads could. Virginia II ran aground, and the Confederates decided not to push further that night and recalled Fredericksburg and Hampton back across the obstructions. Drewry also became grounded and was abandoned; Union fire sank her later in the morning and the resulting explosion pushed Scorpion towards Union lines, where she was captured. Fredericksburg withdrew to Battery Dantzler. Union vessels arrived during the morning and reached the obstructions, firing on the now-freed Virginia II, and Richmond who were still in the process of moving upriver towards the battery. The two Confederate ironclads were able to reach the safety of Battery Dantzler, which provided fire support, striking the gunboat USS Massasoit. Union forces also brought up a Drummond light so that the river could be illuminated during nighttime. While the Confederates considered another attempt through the obstructions that night, it was decided not to risk a movement, and the surviving vessels of Mitchell's squadron withdrew to Chaffin's Bluff. In addition to the hull damage from crossing the obstructions, Fredericksburg also lost an anchor during the affair.

Shortly after the battle at Trent's Reach, Mitchell was replaced as commander of the James River Squadron by Admiral Raphael Semmes. Lieutenant Alphonse Barbot took command of Fredericksburg in February. Fredericksburg was repaired, but did not see further action. On April 3, Semmes was informed that the Confederates were abandoning Richmond. The vessels of the James River Squadron were taken upriver from Chaffin's Bluff to the obstructions at Drewry's Bluff, and the ships, including the ironclads, were burned early that morning. The men of the James River Squadron served on land, moving with the Confederate government to Danville, Virginia, before eventually surrendering in North Carolina. The wreck of Fredericksburg survived later dredging operations, despite being incompletely removed in 1871 and 1872, and the site was rediscovered in the 1980s. Fredericksburg lies parallel to the river, buried under 6 feet (1.8 m) to 15 feet (4.6 m) of sediment. Bisbee reports that the site has been heavily disturbed.

== Sources ==
- Bisbee, Saxon T. (2018). Engines of Rebellion: Confederate Ironclads and Steam Engineering in the American Civil War. Tuscaloosa, Alabama: University of Alabama Press. ISBN 978-0-81731-986-1.
- Canney, Donald L. (2015). The Confederate Steam Navy 1861–1865. Atglen, Pennsylvania: Schiffer Publishing. ISBN 978-0-7643-4824-2.
- Coski, John M. (2005) [1996]. Capital Navy: The Men, Ships, and Operations of the James River Squadron. New York: Savas Beatie. ISBN 978-1-932714-15-9.
- Gaines, W. Craig (2008). Encyclopedia of Civil War Shipwrecks. Baton Rouge, Louisiana: Louisiana State University Press. ISBN 978-0-8071-3274-6.
- Luraghi, Raimondo (1996). A History of the Confederate Navy. Translated by Coletta, Paolo E. Annapolis, Maryland: Naval Institute Press. ISBN 978-1-55750-527-9.
- Marcello, Paul J. (5 October 2015). "Fredericksburg 1862–1865". Dictionary of American Naval Fighting Ships. Naval History and Heritage Command.
- McPherson, James M. (2012). War on the Waters: The Union & Confederate Navies, 1861–1865. Chapel Hill, North Carolina: University of North Carolina Press. ISBN 978-0-8078-3588-3.
- Silverstone, Paul H. (2006). Civil War Navies 1855–1883. The U.S. Navy Warship Series. New York: Routledge. ISBN 978-0-415-97870-5.
- Silverstone, Paul H. (1984). Directory of the World's Capital Ships. New York: Hippocrene Books. ISBN 0-88254-979-0.
- Still, William N. Jr. (1985) [1971]. Iron Afloat: The Story of the Confederate Armorclads. Columbia, South Carolina: University of South Carolina Press. ISBN 978-0-87249-454-1.
