= USS Onondaga (1863) =

American ironclad monitor

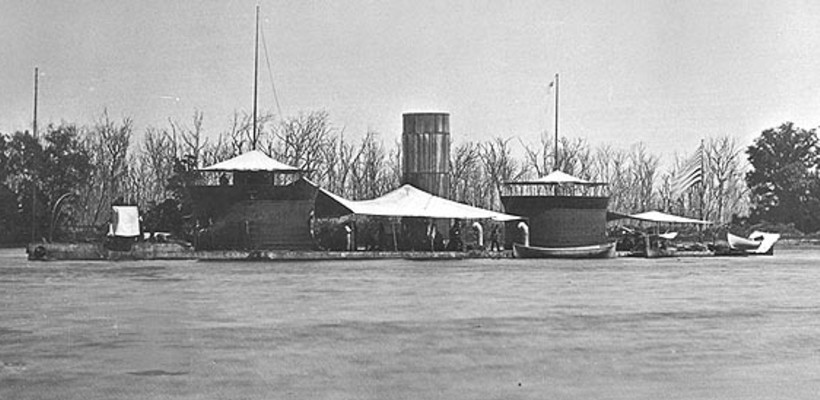
- Onondaga at anchor on the James River, c. 1864–1865

History

United States
- Name: Onondaga
- Namesake: A lake and county in New York
- Ordered: 26 May 1862
- Builder: Continental Iron Works, Greenpoint, Brooklyn
- Laid down: 1862
- Launched: 29 July 1863
- Sponsored by: Sally Sedgwick
- Commissioned: 24 March 1864
- Decommissioned: 8 June 1865
- Fate: Sold to her builder, 7 March 1867, and subsequently resold to France

Second French Empire
- Name: Onondaga
- Acquired: 7 March 1867
- Stricken: 2 December 1904
- Fate: Sold for scrap, 1904

General characteristics (as built)
- Type: Double-turreted monitor
- Displacement: 2,592 long tons (2,634 t)
- Tons burthen: 1,250 tons (bm)
- Length: 226 ft (68.9 m) (o/a)
- Beam: 51 ft 5 in (15.7 m)
- Draft: 12 ft (3.7 m)
- Depth: 12 ft 10 in (3.9 m)
- Installed power: 4 × water-tube boilers; 642 ihp (479 kW)
- Propulsion: 2 × propellers; 2 × back-acting steam engines
- Speed: 7 knots (13 km/h; 8.1 mph)
- Range: 720 nmi (1,330 km; 830 mi)
- Complement: 130 officers and enlisted men
- Armament: 2 × 15 in (381 mm) smoothbore Dahlgren guns; 2 × 150 pdr (8 in (203 mm)) Parrott rifles
- Armor: Gun turret: 11 in (279 mm); Waterline belt: 5.5 in (140 mm); Deck: 2 in (51 mm)

USS Onondaga was an ironclad monitor built for the Union Navy during the American Civil War. Commissioned in 1864, the ship spent her entire active career with the James River Flotilla covering the water approaches to the Confederate States capital of Richmond, Virginia, although her only notable engagement was the Battle of Trent's Reach. After the war, she was purchased by France where she served as a coastal defense ship in the French Navy (Marine Nationale).

Onondaga saw little active service with the French, spending most of the next four decades in reserve, although she was mobilized during the Franco-Prussian War of 1870–1871. The monitor became a guard ship in 1898, but she was stricken from the naval register and sold for scrap in 1904; the ship was demolished in 1905.

== Description ==
Onondaga had an overall length of 226 feet (68.9 m) and a beam of 51 feet 5 inches (15.7 m). She was overweight and her draft of 12 feet (3.7 m) was almost a foot deeper than intended. The ship had a depth of hold of 12 feet 10 inches (3.9 m), a tonnage of 1,250 tons burthen and displaced 2,592 long tons (2,634 t). Her crew consisted of 130 officers and enlisted men. Onondaga was powered by a pair of two-cylinder horizontal back-acting steam engines, built by the Morgan Iron Works, each driving one 10-foot (3 m) propeller using steam generated by four vertical water-tube boilers. The engines had a combined rating of 642 indicated horsepower (479 kW) that gave the ship a speed of 7 knots (13 km/h; 8.1 mph). She carried 160 long tons (163 t) of coal which gave her a range of 720 nautical miles (1,330 km; 830 mi). The propellers were protected from underwater obstacles by iron rings.

The monitor's main battery consisted of a pair of smoothbore, muzzle-loading, 15-inch (381 mm) Dahlgren guns and another pair of 150-pounder (8-inch (203 mm)) Parrott rifles. One of each type was mounted in the two twin-gun turrets. Her pilothouse was built on the roof of the forward turret. Steam power to rotate each turret was provided by a two-cylinder donkey engine. The nine-caliber Dahlgren guns weighed 42,900 pounds (19,500 kg). They could fire a 350-pound (159 kg) shell up to a range of 1,700 yards (1,600 m) at an elevation of +5°. The Parrott rifles were 17 calibers long and weighed 16,550 pounds (7,510 kg). Their 155-pound (70 kg) projectiles had a range of 2,100 yards (1,900 m) at the same elevation.

As designed the exposed area of the hull was protected by 4.5-inch-thick (110 mm) wrought-iron plates, but John Ericsson, designer of the USS Monitor, suggested that the side armor be reinforced with additional wood inside the armor belt in April 1863. As most of the armor had already been mounted by this time, the shipyard simply added 12 inches (305 mm) of wood to the exterior of the armor and sheathed it with a 1-inch (25 mm) armor plate. The weight of the wood was partially responsible for increasing Onondaga's draft by almost a foot more than was designed. The armor of the turrets and the pilot house atop the forward turret consisted of layers of 0.9375-inch-thick (23.8 mm) armor plates totaling 11 inches (279 mm) in thickness. A 5-by-15-inch (127 by 381 mm) soft iron band was fitted around the base of the turrets to prevent shells and fragments from jamming them as had happened during the First Battle of Charleston Harbor in April 1863. Onondaga's deck was protected by two layers of one-inch plates and the base of the funnel was armored as well.

== Construction and career ==
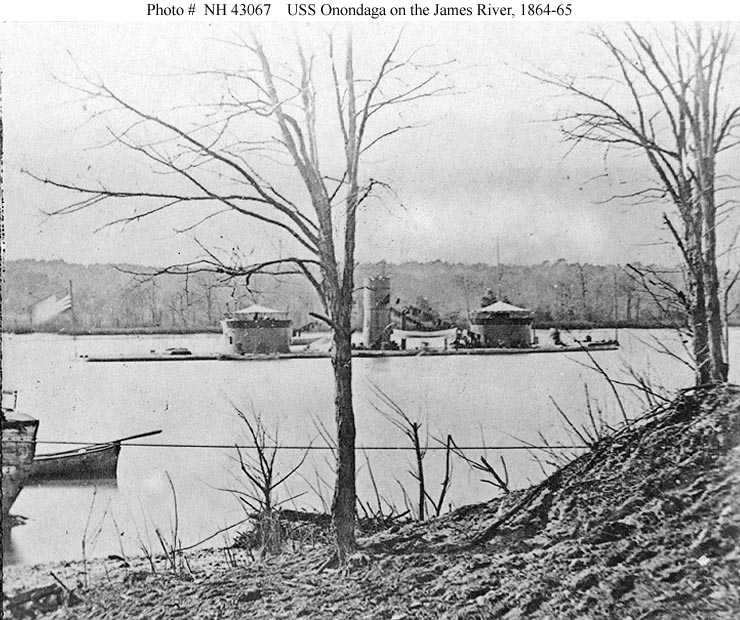
Onondaga on the James River

The Navy solicited bids for a twin-turret ironclad for harbor and coastal service on 20 February 1862 and accepted George W. Quintard's design that generally followed the specifications, albeit built in iron rather than wood and using Ericsson's turrets rather than those designed by Cowper Coles. The Navy ordered Onondaga from Quintard on 25 May at a cost of $625,000; he was the manager of the Morgan Iron Works and built the engines while sub-contracting the rest of the ship to the Continental Iron Works, also in Greenpoint, Brooklyn.

Onondaga, the first U.S. Navy ship to bear the name, was launched on 29 July 1863 and was sponsored by Sally Sedgwick, daughter of former U.S. Representative Charles B. Sedgwick. She was commissioned at the New York Navy Yard on 24 March 1864 with Captain Melancthon Smith in command. Construction was delayed by shortages of material, labor and the closing of the shipyard during the New York City draft riots in July 1863. The ship cost $759,673.08, a budget overrun of almost 22 percent.

Escorted by the gunboat USS Mattabesett, the ship departed New York City on 21 April and arrived at Hampton Roads in Union-occupied Virginia two days later. Assigned to the James River Flotilla, she supported General Ulysses S. Grant's drive on Richmond, Virginia. Together with the other ships of the flotilla, Onondaga patrolled the river and occasionally engaged Confederate artillery batteries on the river.

=== Battle of Trent's Reach ===
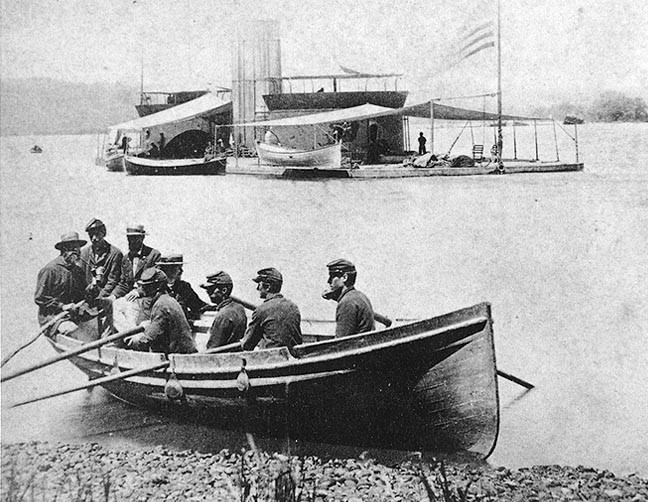
Stern view of Onondaga in the James River

Early in January 1865, most of the Union ironclads were withdrawn from the James River as Rear Admiral David D. Porter assembled most of his ships for the forthcoming attack on Fort Fisher, North Carolina. Onondaga was the only ironclad left to guard Union forces along the James against the Confederate James River Squadron.

When the Confederate squadron steamed down river to attack the weakened Union forces, Onondaga dropped downstream to a position where she could maneuver more easily. She and her supporting gunboats awaited them only to see the attack aborted when elements of the Confederate fleet—the casemate ironclads Virginia II and Richmond, the gunboat Drewry, and the torpedo boat Scorpion—all ran aground as the tide ebbed trying to pass Union obstructions at Trent's Reach, after the casemate ironclad Fredericksburg and the gunboat Hampton had passed through the obstruction at 01:30. The latter two ships continued downriver and anchored below the Dutch Gap Canal to await the rest of the squadron.

The squadron commander, Flag Officer John K. Mitchell, recalled them several hours later and ordered them to anchor further upstream under the guns of Battery Dantzler. As the Confederate ships were refloated at 10:45, Onondaga approached the Union obstructions and opened fire at an estimated range of 880 yards (800 m). Her Dahlgren guns hit Virginia II twice with solid shot; the first shot penetrated her 4-inch-thick (100 mm) armor and badly damaged the 24-inch-thick (610 mm) wooden backing and its supporting beams. The second shot killed one crewman and killed two others as it penetrated the armor and its backing. Richmond was only hit by a glancing shot that damaged the armored shutter that protected the ship's stern gun port before the Confederate ships were able to withdraw upriver.

The decision to move Onondaga downstream resulted in her commanding officer, Commander William Parker, being court-martialled for "neglect of duty in not offering battle to the Confederate ironclads" during this engagement. Secretary Welles set aside the guilty verdict on a technicality.

Onondaga continued to support Union troops for the rest of the war and steamed north after its end on 9 April. The ship was decommissioned at New York City on 8 June and was laid up at League Island, Pennsylvania. By an Act of Congress approved on 7 March 1867, the monitor was sold to back to her builder who resold her to France for 4,330,599 francs.

=== French service ===
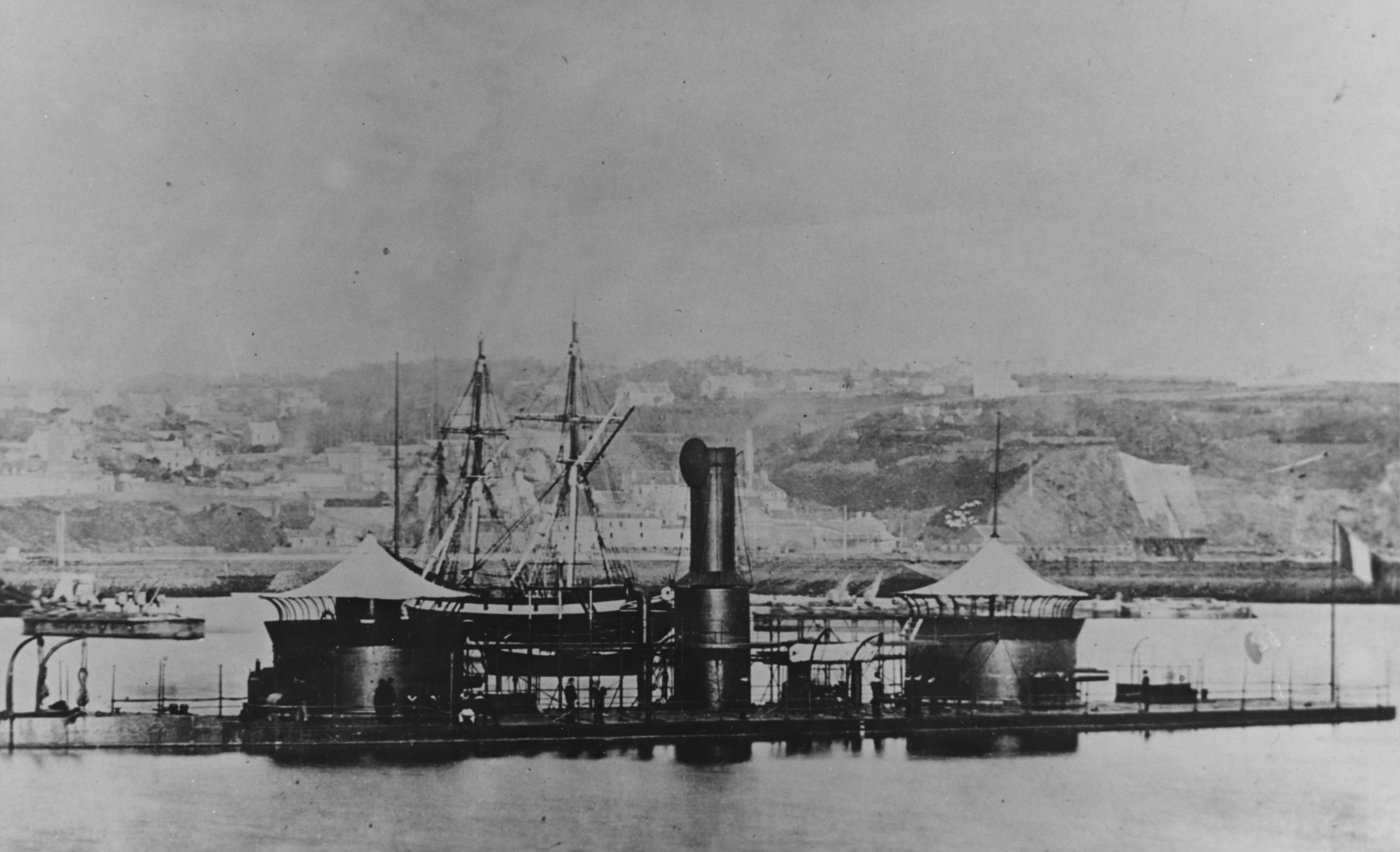
Onondaga, at Brest, France, circa the late 1860s or the 1870s

Onondaga retained her name in French service and was towed from New York City to Halifax beginning on 2 September 1867. She was towed across the Atlantic to Brest by the transport Européen departing on 15 June 1868, escorted by the aviso Volta. The ship began an extensive refit after her arrival on 2 July that include the replacement of her original armament with four 240-millimeter (9.4 in) Modèle 1864 or Modèle 1864-66 rifled breech-loading guns. Other alterations included reworking her hull sides with teak backing the armor, a larger rudder and, probably, removal of the rings around the propellers. The French measured her freeboard at 60 centimeters (2 ft) although it is uncertain if this was before or after these modifications. Onondaga began her sea trials in May 1869 and was subsequently placed in reserve.

The ship was mobilized on 17 July 1870 during the Franco-Prussian War, but saw no combat and returned to reserve afterwards. Her armament was augmented in 1878 by six Hotchkiss 5-barreled revolving cannon, two towed Harvey torpedoes and a torpedo launch. In April 1898 she became the guard ship of the Naval Reserve (Défense mobile) at Saint-Malo and her light guns were replaced by a dozen Hotchkiss guns, half-a-dozen each of 37 mm (1.5 in) and 47 mm (1.9 in) calibers. Onondaga was stricken on 2 December 1904 and was subsequently sold for 127,550 francs. The ship was scrapped in Brest in 1905.
