= CSS Beaufort =

Iron-hull gunboat of the American Civil War

History

Confederate States
- Name: Beaufort
- Namesake: Beaufort, South Carolina
- Owner: James Cathcart Johnston
- Builder: Pusey & Jones, Wilmington, Delaware
- Launched: 1854, as the Caledonia
- Commissioned: July 9, 1861
- Home port: Edenton, North Carolina
- Fate: Captured by United States Navy April 3, 1865; Sold September 15, 1865; Converted into barge 1878

General characteristics
- Type: Screw steamer
- Tonnage: 85 tons
- Length: 85 ft (26 m)
- Beam: 17 ft 5 in (5.31 m)
- Depth of hold: 6 ft 11 in (2.11 m)
- Propulsion: Steam engine, 1 propeller
- Armament: 1 gun, later 2 guns

The CSS Beaufort (/ˈbjuːfərt/ BEW-fert) was an iron-hull gunboat that served in North Carolina and Virginia during the American Civil War. Originally launched as Caledonia at Wilmington, Delaware, in 1854, the ship was owned by James Cathcart Johnston. It saw use as a tugboat on the Dismal Swamp Canal. On July 9, 1861, Beaufort was commissioned into the navy of the state of North Carolina for use in the American Civil War. First serving on the North Carolina coast, Beaufort was present at the battles of Roanoke Island and Elizabeth City in February 1862. Escaping the Confederate defeat at Elizabeth City via the Dismal Swamp Canal, Beaufort reached Norfolk, Virginia, where she joined the James River Squadron.

On March 8, 1862, Beaufort served as an escort and ship's tender for the ironclad CSS Virginia at the Battle of Hampton Roads. In April, she supported the Confederate defense of Yorktown, Virginia, before the Confederates withdrew up the Virginia Peninsula. Before the Battle of Drewry's Bluff in mid-May 1862, Beaufort was ordered upriver and was mostly inactive until mid-1864. With Union troops having moved upriver, Beaufort saw some action, including bombarding the Fort Harrison area after Union troops had captured it. However, the ship was hampered with an understrength crew, as much of her crew had been transferred to North Carolina or to land fortifications along the James River. In January 1865, Beaufort was part of the Confederate advance before the Battle of Trent's Reach, but ended up spending hours trying to free the ironclad CSS Virginia II after the latter had run aground. On the night of April 2/3, after the fall of Richmond, Virginia, the Confederates scuttled the ships of the James River Squadron, but Beaufort failed to sink. Captured by Union forces, Beaufort was sold in September 1865. As a civilian merchant vessel, she was renamed Roanoke and was converted into a barge in 1878.

== Construction and early history ==
Originally known as Caledonia, Beaufort was launched at Wilmington, Delaware, in 1854. Constructed by Pusey & Jones, Caledonia had been built for James Cathcart Johnston, who named it after his plantation, although the ship as constructed was found to have too deep a draft to navigate to the plantation. Caledonia was originally based out of Edenton, North Carolina. Later used as a tugboat on the Dismal Swamp Canal, the vessel had a tonnage of 85 tons, a length of 85 feet (26 m), a beam of 17 feet 5 inches (5.31 m), and a depth of hold of 6 feet 11 inches (2.11 m). An iron-hulled screw steamer, power was provided by a single vertical direct acting steam engine.

Early in the American Civil War, the coastline of North Carolina was recognized as being of strategic importance, and a state Military and Navy Board was created. Part of the state's defenses was the North Carolina Navy (informally known as the Mosquito Fleet). One of the Mosquito Fleet's vessels was Beaufort. The Dictionary of American Naval Fighting Ships states that Beaufort was commissioned for military service on July 9, 1861, by Lieutenant R. C. Duvall, while at Norfolk, Virginia, before then traveling to New Bern, North Carolina. The Official Records of the Union and Confederate Navies reports that Beaufort was purchased at New Bern. In order to allow her to mount a cannon, the vessel's structure was strengthened with wooden beams. Beaufort was armed with a 32-pounder rifled cannon, and her magazine and boiler were located in a position where they would be endangered during naval combat. She was manned by a crew of 35. The crews of the ships of the North Carolina Navy were generally inexperienced in naval matters and were barely trained for the service they performed, ammunition was often faulty, and the cannons the ships were armed with had a tendency to explode.

== Confederate service ==
=== North Carolina ===
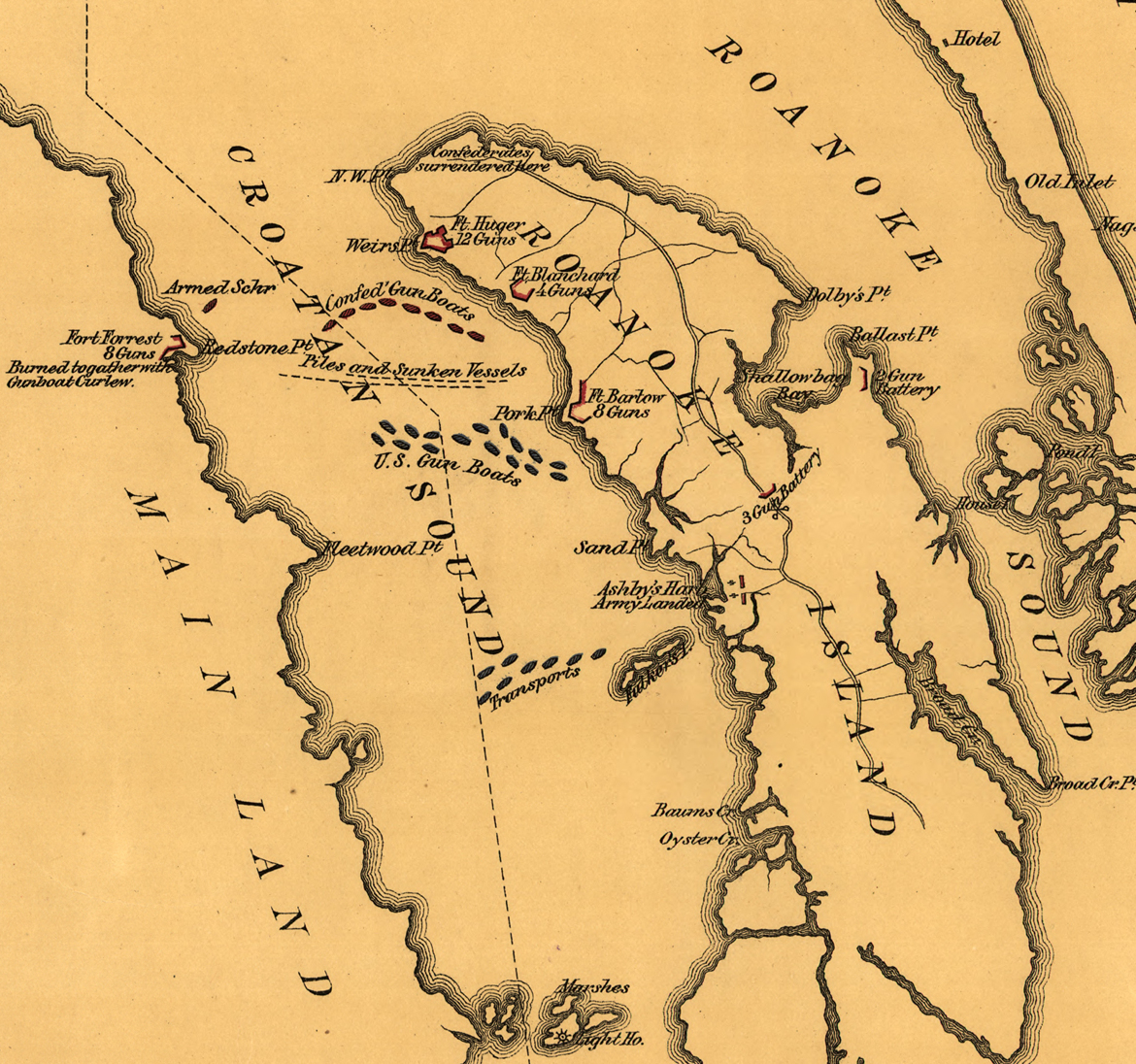
1862 map of the positions of the Union and Confederacy at the Battle of Roanoke Island

Beaufort took part in the first ship-versus-ship action of the American Civil War on July 20, when it fought USS Albatross near Oregon Inlet. Albatross was a much larger vessel than Beaufort, but both ships spent the 45-minute battle firing from behind the cover of either side of a barrier island. At this time, Beaufort was still under the command of Duvall. Later that month, Beaufort and the other ships of the North Carolina Navy were transferred into the Confederate States Navy from the North Carolina state forces. Along with fellow Mosquito Fleet vessels CSS Winslow and CSS Raleigh, Beaufort engaged in raiding Union merchant shipping along the North Carolina coast, although Winslow had the most success. Confederate Lieutenant William Harwar Parker took command of Beaufort on September 9.

By the time of Burnside's North Carolina Expedition in February 1862, Beaufort was part of the Confederate fleet near Roanoke Island commanded by Commodore William F. Lynch. Confederate land forces had built three forts on the island, and Lynch's Mosquito Fleet was present as well, positioned behind a group of blockships sunk between the island and the North Carolina mainland. The Union had an infantry force prepared to land, as well as a naval force. Both outnumbered their Confederate counterparts. On February 7, the Battle of Roanoke Island began, with the Union ships firing on the Mosquito Fleet and on the Confederate land defenses. Only one of the forts was in a position where it could return fire. The Mosquito Fleet tried to lure the Union vessels further north into the range of the other two forts, but this was not successful. The Union was able to land infantry on Roanoke Island and overran the island's defenders the next day. After the fight at Roanoke Island, Lynch withdrew his ships to Elizabeth City, North Carolina. Parker and most of Beaufort's crew were sent ashore to man a fortification on February 10, the same day that Union ships attacked and brought on the Battle of Elizabeth City. Most of the Mosquito Fleet was destroyed in the fighting, but Beaufort was able to escape up the Dismal Swamp Canal to Norfolk.

=== Hampton Roads and inactivity ===
At Norfolk, Beaufort was part of the James River Squadron. Led by the ironclad CSS Virginia, the squadron sallied forth against the vessels of the Union blockade stationed in Hampton Roads on March 8. Beaufort and Raleigh served as escort vessels for the ironclad. At the mouth of the Elizabeth River on the way to Hampton Roads, Beaufort had to use a hawser to assist Virginia in turning in shallow water. Virginia attacked the blockaders in the Battle of Hampton Roads and after sinking one Union vessel, badly damaged USS Congress. Beaufort and Raleigh moved towards Congress to negotiate surrender of the damaged vessel but came under fire from the shore. After an officer from Virginia was wounded during another attempt to negotiate the surrender of Congress, Virginia sank the blockader. Beaufort also served as a ship's tender for Virginia during the battle and fired on other Union ships. The crew of Beaufort received the Thanks of Congress from the Confederate States Congress for her role in the battle.

On April 18, Beaufort joined Raleigh and the gunboats CSS Teaser, CSS Jamestown, and CSS Patrick Henry in supporting the Confederate land forces defending Yorktown, Virginia. The Confederates retreated from the Virginia Peninsula, and fell back to close to Richmond, Virginia, leading to the abandonment of Norfolk and the scuttling of Virginia. When Union ships moved up the James River towards Drewry's Bluff in May, Beaufort and several other Confederate vessels were sent to a safe position upriver while their crews fought from land positions in the Battle of Drewry's Bluff on May 15.

The James River Squadron entered into a long period of routine patrolling of a stretch of 8 miles (13 km) of the James River downriver from Richmond until 1864, when the region was threatened by Union ships again. Not long after Hampton Roads, Parker was transferred to Charleston, South Carolina. For a period of time in 1862 and 1863, Lieutenant William H. Murdaugh commanded Beaufort. Lieutenant William Sharp took command in October 1863, and was replaced by Lieutenant Edward J. Means the next month. Means remained in command until June 1864. A second cannon had been added to Beaufort's armament by November 30, 1863. Beaufort remained inactive during the time Means was in command. Union vessels had moved upriver towards the Confederate positions in mid-May, and the James River Squadron's new commander, Captain John Kirkwood Mitchell, requested a more experienced officer be assigned to command Beaufort in anticipation of action. Lieutenant J. M. Gardner then took command in June.

=== End of war ===
On September 29, Union infantry won the Battle of Fort Harrison, and captured Fort Harrison itself, a Confederate defensive position. In response, Beaufort, along with several other Confederate vessels, bombarded Union troops in the area of the fort from September 29 through October 1. The Confederate fire was effective, and Union return fire did little damage. A number of men from Beaufort were also transferred to man land fortifications. Other members of the ship's crew had been transferred to North Carolina in July, and as a result of the shortage of crew members Beaufort could provide only minimal service. Some Confederate sailors were released in prisoner exchanges in October, which allowed the vessel to regain some crew strength. November saw Beaufort's armament reduced to a single 32-pounder cannon. Lieutenant William Pinckney Mason took command of Beaufort in October, and Lieutenant Joseph W. Alexander took over on December 19. In January 1865, Mitchell decided to sally forth and attack the Union ships in the James River, as many Union ships had been transferred to North Carolina for the operations against Confederate-held Fort Fisher.

On the evening of January 23, the Confederate ships began their movements downriver, starting the Battle of Trent's Reach. As the navigable channel of the river was narrow, the wooden Confederate ships were either lashed to one of the three ironclads in the James River Squadron, or were towed behind another ship. Beaufort and the tender CSS Drewry were lashed to the ironclad CSS Richmond, with Drewry towing the torpedo boat CSS Wasp. When the ironclad CSS Virginia II ran aground, Drewry and Beaufort were released to go to her aid. Drewry later moved downstream, but Beaufort and the gunboat CSS Nansemond spent three hours unsuccessfully trying to free the ironclad. Before dawn, the Confederate vessels that had not run aground withdrew upriver, but Drewry, Richmond, Virginia II, and the torpedo boat CSS Scorpion had all grounded within range of Union guns. While the two ironclads were eventually able to get free and escape, Drewry blew up after being struck by Union fire, and the explosion forced Scorpion downriver, where she was captured.

Command of Beaufort passed to George Henry Arledge on February 12. Mitchell was relieved of command on February 18 and replaced by Rear Admiral Raphael Semmes. Mitchell left Semmes a description of the condition of the James River Squadron vessels, which noted that Beaufort was "not servicable, except in emergencies" and that she had problems with her propeller and rudder. The Confederates abandoned Richmond on April 2, and the James River Squadron was scuttled. The ironclads were destroyed at Drewry's Bluff, while the wooden ships went upriver to Richmond to be burned on the night of April 2/3. The fire set on Beaufort did not sink her, and the ship was captured by Union troops. She was operated by the Union until September 15, when she was sold. Beaufort was then used as a civilian merchant vessel, and was renamed Roanoke in October. In 1878 she was converted into a barge.

== Sources ==
- Barrett, John G. (1997) [1963]. The Civil War in North Carolina. Chapel Hill, North Carolina: University of North Carolina Press. ISBN 0-8078-4520-5.
- Browning, Robert M. (1993). From Cape Charles to Cape Fear: The North Atlantic Blockading Squadron During the Civil War. Tuscaloosa, Alabama: University of Alabama Press. ISBN 0-8173-5019-5.
- Calore, Paul (2002). Naval Campaigns of the Civil War. Jefferson, North Carolina: McFarland & Company. ISBN 978-0-7864-1217-4.
- Coski, John M. (2005) [1996]. Capital Navy: The Men, Ships, and Operations of the James River Squadron. New York: Savas Beatie. ISBN 978-1-932714-15-9.
- Luraghi, Raimondo (1996). A History of the Confederate Navy. Translated by Coletta, Paolo E. Annapolis, Maryland: Naval Institute Press. ISBN 978-1-55750-527-9.
- Lytle, William M. (1952). Merchant Steam Vessels of the United States 1807–1868. Mystic, Connecticut: The Steamship Historical Society of America. OCLC 7195533.
- Official Records of the Union and Confederate Navies in the War of the Rebellion, Series 1. Vol. 6. Harrisburg, Pennsylvania: National Historical Society. 1987 [1897]. ISBN 978-0-918678-30-0.
- Official Records of the Union and Confederate Navies in the War of the Rebellion, Series 2. U. S. Naval War Records Office. Office memoranda. Vol. 1. Harrisburg, Pennsylvania: National Historical Society. 1987 [1921]. ISBN 978-0-918678-30-0.
- Silverstone, Paul H. (1989). Warships of the Civil War Navies. Annapolis, Maryland: Naval Institute Press. ISBN 0-87021-783-6.
- Still, William N.; Stephenson, Richard A. (2021). Shipbuilding in North Carolina, 1688–1918. Chapel Hill, North Carolina: University of North Carolina Press. ISBN 978-0-8652-6494-6.
- Trotter, William R. (1989). Ironclads and Columbiads: The Civil War in North Carolina: The Coast. Winston-Salem, North Carolina: John F. Blair. ISBN 0-89587-088-6.
- Wiggins, Kenneth R. (2019). America's Anchor: A Naval History of the Delaware River and Bay, Cradle of the United States Navy. Jefferson, North Carolina: McFarland & Company. ISBN 978-1-4766-7197-0.
