= Squib-class torpedo boat =

Confederate States Navy ships

Squib class
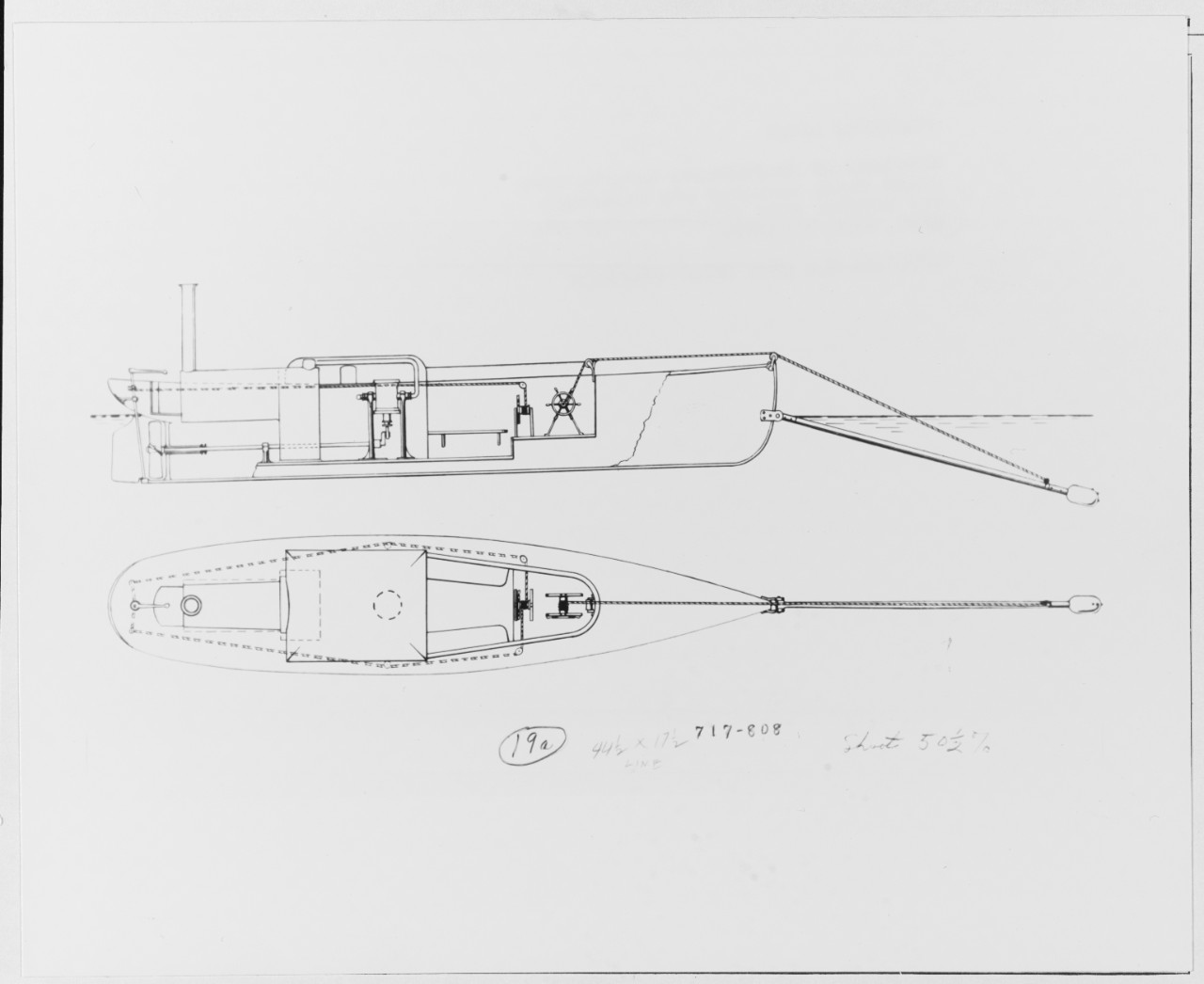
- Design plans for Squib

Class overview
- Name: Squib class
- Builders: Hunter Davidson; William A. Graves
- Operators: Confederate States Navy
- Built: 1863 - 64
- In commission: 1864–1865
- Planned: 15
- Completed: 4
- Canceled: 11
- Lost: 4

General characteristics
- Type: Torpedo boat
- Length: 30 to 35 feet (9.1 to 10.7 m) (Squib); 46 feet (14 m) (others)
- Beam: 6 feet (1.8 m) (Squib); 6 feet 3 inches (1.91 m) (others)
- Depth of hold: 3 feet 9 inches (1.14 m)
- Propulsion: 1 × double-cylinder steam engine (Squib); 2 × oscillating condensing engines (others)
- Complement: 5 or 6
- Armament: 1 × spar torpedo
- Armor: Thin iron plates

The Squib class torpedo boats were built for the Confederate States Navy during the later stages of the American Civil War. After the torpedo boat CSS David attacked and damaged the ironclad USS New Ironsides, the Confederates continued building torpedo boats with hopes of breaking the Union blockade. Four vessels of the class – CSS Hornet, CSS Wasp, CSS Squib, and CSS Scorpion – were constructed in Richmond, Virginia, in 1864. All were armed with a single spar torpedo and were powered by steam engines. Squib damaged the gunboat USS Minnesota in an attack on April 9, 1864, and was later sent to Wilmington, North Carolina, where she was scuttled in February 1865. The other three vessels of the class were all part of the James River Squadron and participated in the Battle of Trent's Reach on the night of January 23 and 24, 1865. Scorpion ran aground during the battle, and was forced downriver and out of control after the tender CSS Drewry exploded on January 24. She was later captured by Union forces and may have been burned. Hornet was sunk in a collision with another vessel on January 27, and Wasp was scuttled on the night of April 2/3, as the Confederates were abandoning Richmond.

== Description and construction ==
During the American Civil War, the Union blockade was suffocating the breakaway Confederate States of America. In an attempt to break the blockade, the torpedo boat CSS David attacked the Union ironclad USS New Ironsides on October 5, 1863, damaging the Union vessel. As a result of David's attack, the Confederates continued to build additional torpedo boats. Led by Lieutenant Hunter Davidson, and constructor William A. Graves, Confederate engineers in Richmond, Virginia, designed a new class of torpedo boats based on a different pattern than David. While David was semi-submersible, the Richmond design, known as the Squib-class, was not. Four were completed: CSS Squib, CSS Scorpion, CSS Hornet, and CSS Wasp. These vessels had wooden hulls, and were driven by a propeller. Squib was about 30 feet (9.1 m) to 35 feet (11 m), with a beam of about 6 feet (1.8 m). She was powered by a double-cylinder steam engine, which had a single boiler and funnel. The engine was located amidships, and the boiler and funnel aft. Squib was reportedly quite fast.

The other three vessels of the class were longer than Squib and were very similar amongst themselves. They were 46 feet (14 m) long, with a beam of 6 feet 3 inches (1.91 m). All four ships are reported as having a depth of hold of 3 feet 9 inches (1.14 m). Their tonnage is unknown. One of the three non-Squib vessels of the class had two oscillating condensing engines, which had a 7-inch (18 cm) cylinder and a 6-inch (15 cm) stroke, as well as a single boiler. The vessel was described as having "fair speed for a boat of her kind" by a Union engineer. All of the vessels of the class carried a crew of five or six. They were armed with a single spar torpedo, which was mounted on a shaft that was either 18 feet (5.5 m) according to naval historian Paul H. Silverstone or 16 feet (4.9 m) long according to naval historian John M. Coski. The spar could be raised or lowered by the ship's crew using a chain and tackle system. The ships's sides were armored by thin plates of iron.

Squib was launched in early 1864, having been laid down at an unknown time in the prior year, with the others built later that year. Confederate States Secretary of the Navy Stephen R. Mallory ordered six Squib-class boats from England in July 1864, but they were never delivered. Additionally, two others were still under construction at Richmond in April 1865; the Confederates abandoned Richmond early in that month. Incomplete vessels at the Confederate naval facilities were burned when the city was abandoned. Construction had been started on another in South Carolina and two more in Columbus, Georgia.

== Ships ==
Ship	Laid down	Fate
Squib	1863	Scuttled February 1865, off Cape Fear
Scorpion	1864	Captured, January 24, 1865; possibly burned
Wasp	1864	Scuttled on night of April 2/3, 1865, near Richmond, Virginia
Hornet	1864	Sunk in collision, January 27, 1864

=== Squib ===
Squib was also known as Infanta. Commanded by Davidson, Squib snuck into the midst of the Union fleet at Hampton Roads on April 9, 1864, and attacked the Union flagship USS Minnesota. After lowering the spar underwater, Davidson and his crew rammed the torpedo into Minnesota. The ensuing explosion of the 53 pounds (24 kg) of gunpowder in the torpedo damaged, but did not sink, the Union vessel. The torpedo had been too close to the water surface, reducing the effect of the explosion. Squib escaped. She was also used to carry flags of truce. At an unknown date during mid-1864, Squib was transported by railcar to Wilmington, North Carolina, where she served in the Cape Fear River. While later reports of the activities of Squib no longer exist, she may have been used to ferry men and supplies during the Second Battle of Fort Fisher. In February 1865, she was scuttled by her crew at Point Peter on Cape Fear.

=== Scorpion ===
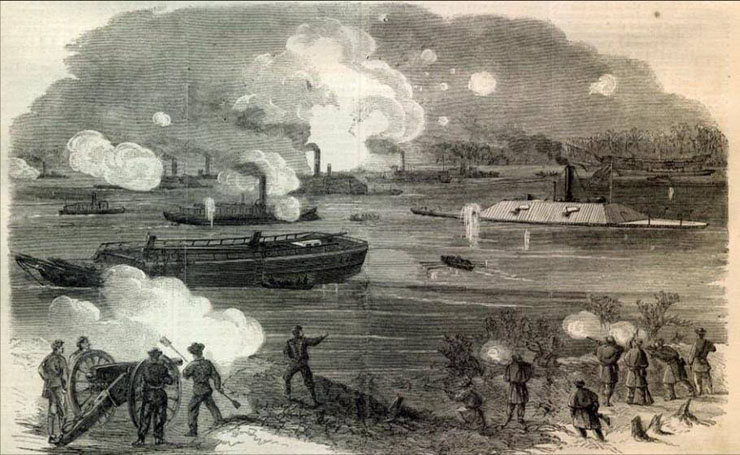
Confederate vessels at the Battle of Trent's Reach

Commanded by Lieutenant Edward Lakin, Scorpion performed guard duty on the James River as part of the James River Squadron. On the night of January 23, 1865, Scorpion participated in the Confederate offensive known as the Battle of Trent's Reach. When the Confederate vessels present reached Union obstructions at Trent's Reach, Scorpion went ahead to perform depth soundings. Afterwards, while moving to get a lantern from the ironclad CSS Virginia II, Scorpion ran aground. At 07:10 on January 24, she was swept downriver and out of control when Union fire caused the armed tender CSS Drewry to explode. The explosion killed two crew members from Scorpion and swept four others overboard. Efforts to rescue her that night failed. She was later captured by Union forces, and may have been burned.

=== Wasp ===
Wasp was commanded by Master's Mate J. W. Matherson and was part of the James River Squadron. She was present at the Battle of Trent's Reach on January 23 and 24. During the action, she helped refloat Hornet after the latter vessel ran aground, and unsuccessfully tried to get Scorpion ungrounded, but temporarily ran aground herself. Later, she withdrew to the Confederate position at Battery Dantzler. Wasp then served as a picket boat for Virginia II. She was burned on the night of April 2/3, as the Confederates abandoned Richmond.

=== Hornet ===
Hornet was commanded by Master Samuel P. Blanc. On January 23 and 24, 1865, she also took part in the action at Trent's Reach. After Scorpion ran aground, Hornet, who had been proceeding towards the ironclad CSS Richmond, encountered her and tried to get her unstuck, but was unable to do so due to the shallowness of the water. Hornet then moved upriver towards Battery Dantzler, arriving around the time of daylight. On January 27, Hornet collided with the steamer CSS Allison and sank.

== Sources ==
- Campbell, R. Thomas (2000). Hunters of the Night: Confederate Torpedo Boats in the War Between the States. Shippensburg, Pennsylvania: Burd Street Press. ISBN 1-57249-202-3.
- Coski, John M. (2005) [2006]. Capital Navy: The Men, Ships, and Operations of the James River Squadron. New York: Savas Beatie. ISBN 978-1-932714-15-9.
- Pry, Peter; Zeitlin, Richard (1984). "Torpedo Boats: Secret Weapons of the South". Warship International. 21 (4): 384–393. ISSN 0043-0374.
- Silverstone, Paul H. (1989). Warships of the Civil War Navies. Annapolis, Maryland: Naval Institute Press. ISBN 978-0-87021-783-8.
