= CSS Scorpion =

Squib-class torpedo boat procured late in 1864 by the Confederate States Navy

History

Confederate States
- Name: Scorpion
- In service: Late 1864
- Fate: Abandoned and captured

General characteristics
- Class & type: Squib-class torpedo boat
- Length: 46 feet (14 m)
- Beam: 6 feet 3 inches (1.91 m)
- Depth of hold: 3 feet 9 inches (1.14 m)
- Armament: 1x spar torpedo
- Armor: Thin iron plates

CSS Scorpion was a Squib-class torpedo boat that served in the Confederate States Navy during the American Civil War. Armed with a single spar torpedo, she originally served guard duty on the James River after being built in late 1864. Along with the rest of the James River Squadron, Scorpion moved downriver on January 23, 1865, and participated in the Battle of Trent's Reach. After performing depth soundings near Union obstructions, Scorpion moved to get a lantern from the ironclad CSS Virginia II, but ran into a hawser and then ran aground. At 07:10 on the morning of January 24, Union fire struck the abandoned tender CSS Drewry, which then exploded. The force of the explosion swept Scorpion out of control downriver. An attempt to rescue her that night failed, and she was captured by Union forces.

== Construction and characteristics ==
During the American Civil War, the Union blockade was slowly destroying the economy of the rebelling Confederate States of America. The first use of torpedo boats in attempting to break the blockade came in October 1863. The attack damaged a Union vessel, and the partial success led the Confederates to build additional torpedo boats. Multiple designs were used, including a group known as the Squib-class built at Richmond, Virginia. Lieutenant Hunter Davidson playing a significant role in the design.

CSS Scorpion, one of the Squib-class, was constructed in late 1864, and was 46 feet (14 m) long, had a beam of 6 feet 3 inches (1.91 m), and a depth of hold of 3 feet 9 inches (1.14 m). Tonnage for the class is unknown. The Squib-class ships were powered by two oscillating condensing engines, which had a 7-inch (18 cm) diameter cylinder and a 6-inch (15 cm) stroke, as well a single boiler. According to a Union engineer, she could go at "a fair speed for a boat of her kind". Her crew of five or six operated steer gear that was located towards the front of the vessel. Her armament was a single spar torpedo mounted to a spar shaft that measured 18 feet (5.5 m) or 16 feet (4.9 m) long. The spar could be raised or lowered by the ship's crew using a chain and tackle system. Thin plates of iron served as armor on the ships's sides.

== Service history ==
After construction, Scorpion entered Confederate service with the James River Squadron. Under the command of Lieutenant Edward Lakin, she performed guard duty in the James River. Beginning on January 23, 1865, the James River Squadron began an offensive against the Union supply depot at City Point, Virginia. To reduce the chance of collisions in the narrow river, the wooden vessels of the fleet were lashed to the ironclads. Overall, the Confederates had 11 ships present: three ironclads, three gunboats, three torpedo boats, and two tenders. Scorpion was towed by the tender CSS Torpedo, which was in turn lashed to the ironclad CSS Virginia II. Moving during the night, the Confederate vessels passed a Union shore position known as Fort Brady, which fired upon them. At around 09:00, the Confederate vessels reached Union obstructions in the river at Trent's Reach.

Scorpion was then sent forward to perform depth sounding, with a pilot from Virginia II aboard. The pilot claimed that the channel was not open, but Charles Read, who commanded all of the torpedo boats in the James River Squadron, found that a passage could be made; the pilot may have become unnerved by Union shore fire. The ironclad CSS Fredericksburg then managed to clear the obstructions at around 01:30 on January 24. Read later took Scorpion to look for the gunboat CSS Hampton, but after not finding her, took the ship to Virginia II to get a lantern for lighting the passage. Virginia II had run aground, and the same fate had befallen the ironclad CSS Richmond as well. The tender CSS Drewry then ran aground trying to free Richmond. Moving towards Virginia II, Scorpion ran into a hawser strung between the former ship and the gunboat CSS Beaufort, losing her torpedo and spar in the process. Not long afterwards, she ran aground. The torpedo boat CSS Hornet then ran aground trying to free Scorpion. The Confederate vessels that were not aground withdrew upriver before daylight. At 06:55, the crew of Drewry was taken onto Richmond, and at 07:10, Union fire caused Drewry to explode. The force of the explosion knocked Scorpion downriver out of control; two men on board were killed and four others swept overboard. After dark on January 24, Read tried to take Beaufort downriver to rescue Scorpion, but as Beaufort could not be controlled due to a strong wind, and a smaller vessel was sent to Scorpion. Scorpion was found to have taken on water, and after the Union illuminated the area with a Drummond light, the efforts to rescue the vessel were abandoned. She was later captured by Union forces, and may have been burned.

== Sources ==
- Campbell, R. Thomas (2000). Hunters of the Night: Confederate Torpedo Boats in the War Between the States. Shippensburg, Pennsylvania: Burd Street Press. ISBN 1-57249-202-3.
- Coski, John M. (2005) [1996]. Capital Navy: The Men, Ships, and Operations of the James River Squadron. New York: Savas Beatie. ISBN 978-1-932714-15-9.
- Pry, Peter; Zeitlin, Richard (1984). "Torpedo Boats: Secret Weapons of the South". Warship International. 21 (4): 384–393.
- Silverstone, Paul H. (1989). Warships of the Civil War Navies. Annapolis, Maryland: Naval Institute Press. ISBN 978-0-87021-783-8.
