= USS Massasoit =

Gunboat of the United States Navy

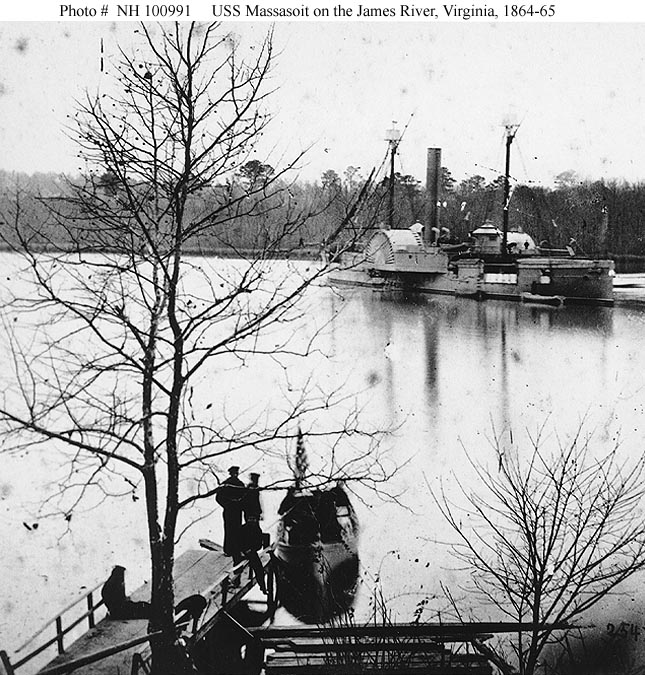

History

United States
- Launched: 8 March 1863
- Commissioned: 8 March 1864
- Decommissioned: 31 July 1864
- In service: 25 August 1864
- Out of service: 27 June 1865
- Fate: Sold, 15 October 1867

General characteristics
- Class & type: Sassacus-class gunboat
- Displacement: 974 tons
- Length: 205 ft (62 m)
- Beam: 35 ft (11 m)
- Draft: 8 ft 8 in (2.64 m)
- Propulsion: steam engine; side wheel-propelled
- Speed: 8.5 knots (15.7 km/h; 9.8 mph)
- Armament: two 100-pounder guns; four 9" smoothbore guns; two 24-pounder guns; two 12-pounder guns

USS Massasoit was a steamer purchased by the Union Navy during the American Civil War.

She was used by the Union Navy for anti-raider duty, bombardment duty, dispatch duty, and as a gunboat stationed off Confederate ports to prevent their trading with foreign countries.

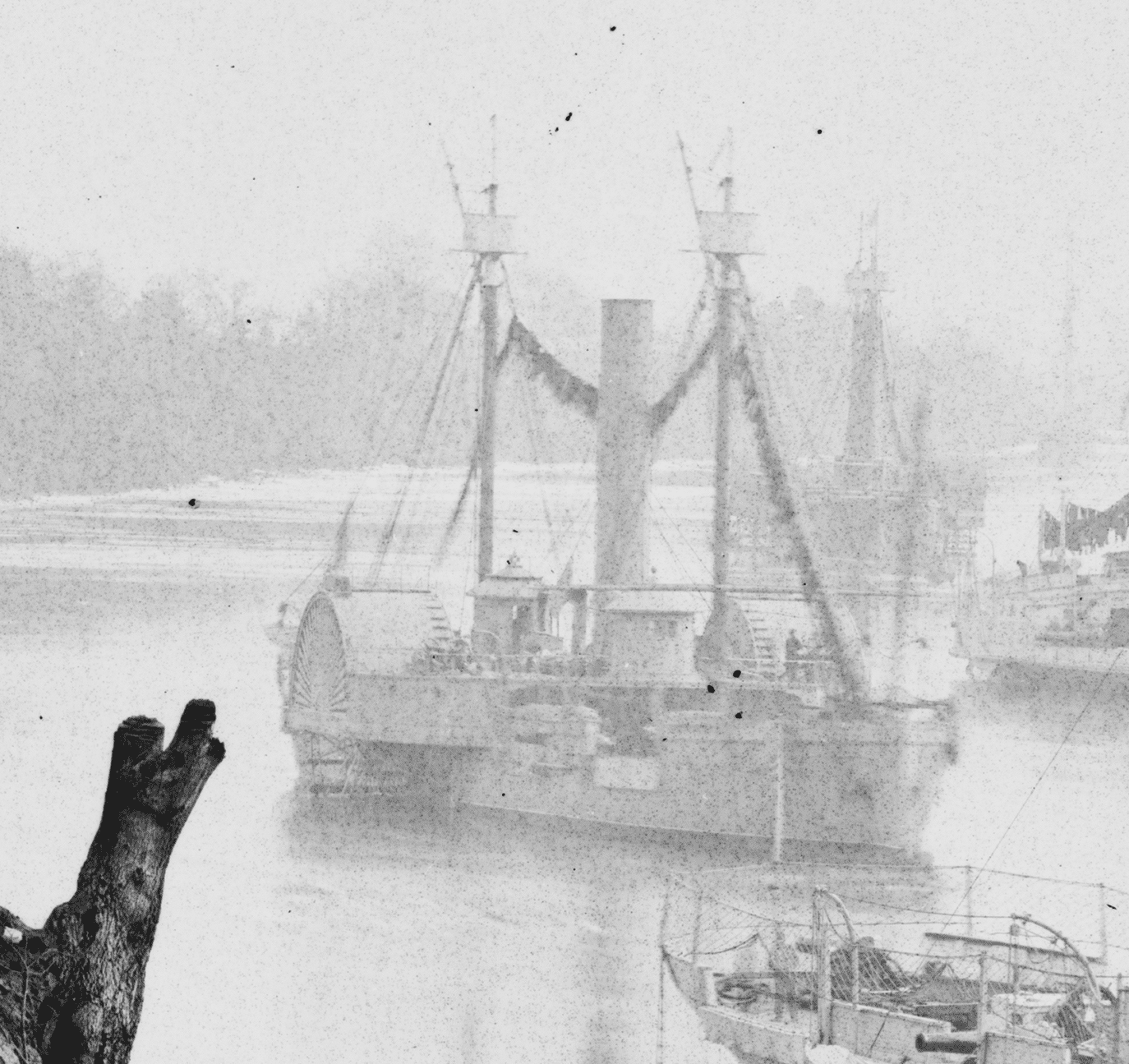
USS Massasoit on the James River.

== Service history ==
Massasoit was launched 8 March 1863 by Curtis & Tilden, Boston, Massachusetts; commissioned 8 March 1864, Lt. Comdr. Edward Barrett in command; but did not leave the Navy Yard before decommissioning 31 July 1864. Recommissioned 25 August 1864 in the tense days before General William Tecumseh Sherman's "march to the sea," she first patrolled the New England coast for Confederate raiders. In October Massasoit joined Rear Admiral David Dixon Porter's North Atlantic Blockading Squadron. After several escort voyages from New York City to Hampton Roads, Virginia, she served on picket duty on the James River, in Virginia. She took part in the 24 January 1865 duel with Confederate batteries at Howlett's House, and the following months stood by to prevent any southern rams from reaching the coast. Ordered 6 April to carry dispatches to General William Tecumseh Sherman in North Carolina, she remained on duty in the Sounds of North Carolina in the last days of the Civil War. Entering New York Harbor 18 June, Massasoit decommissioned 27 June 1865 and was sold 15 October 1867.
