= James River Squadron =

Squadron of the Confederate States Navy

- Active: 1861-1865
- Country: Confederate States of America
- Branch: Virginia Navy; Confederate States Navy
- Type: Naval Squadron
- Engagements: American Civil War: Battle of Hampton Roads

Commanders
- Notable commanders: French Forrest; John R. Tucker; Franklin Buchanan; Sidney Smith Lee; Raphael Semmes

The James River Squadron was formed shortly after the secession of Virginia during the American Civil War. The squadron was part of the Virginia Navy before being transferred to the Confederate States Navy. The squadron is most notable for its role in patrolling the James River, which was the main water approach to the Confederate capital, Richmond. It had two phases: early war, when it consisted mostly of wooden ships (besides the famous CSS Virginia) which ended with the Battle of Drewry's Bluff on May 15, 1862; and its later ironclad composition with the flagship CSS Virginia II.

== History ==
=== Background ===
The Provisional Navy of Virginia was established by an ordinance of the Convention of Virginia on 27 April 27, 1861, when Virginia seceded from the Union. The James River Squadron was formed as part of this navy. When Virginia joined the Confederate States of America, Governor John Letcher issued a proclamation on 6 June 1861, transferring "all officers, seamen, and marines of the Provisional Navy of Virginia" and they were absorbed into the Confederate States Navy.

=== First phase ===
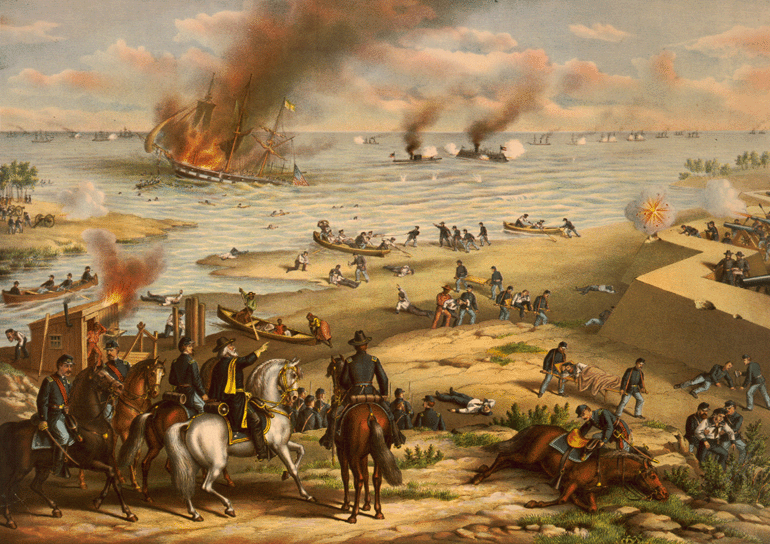
Battle Between the Monitor and Merrimac

John Randolph Tucker was the commander of the James River Squadron during its first real action at the Battle of Hampton Roads on March 8–9, 1862 near Norfolk, Virginia. At that time, the squadron included the ironclad CSS Virginia (aka Merrimack), the side-wheel steamers CSS Thomas Jefferson (aka Jamestown) and CSS Patrick Henry (aka Yorktown), and the propeller-driven gunboats CSS Beaufort and CSS Raleigh.

The part taken by the little James River squadron is not the least remarkable part of that great fight. It was lost sight of in the battle of the ironclad giants, but in the days of oak walls would have been recorded with honorable mention among the acts of bravery and seamanship which illustrate a navy.

For the part played by the CSS Jamestown, its commander, Joseph N. Barney, was promoted.

The diminution of the squadron came when the Federals were able to travel up the James River after the Confederates destroyed its guardian, CSS Virginia. In an attempt to bolster the obstructions at Drewry's Bluff, the CSS Jamestown was sunk and its guns mounted on the bluff. Its crew, along with the crews of the rest of the squadron, fought at the Battle of Drewry's Bluff on May 15, 1862. The hull of the new ironclad CSS Richmond was towed from Norfolk to Richmond during this withdrawal.

=== Second phase ===
After May 1862 to the end of 1863, life was relatively quiet on the James River. Because of this lack of activity, the War Department decided that the Army of Northern Virginia, always hard pressed for troops, needed the sailors more than the navy. Detachments of sailors were assigned temporarily to cover the Richmond defenses and free troops for use in the field. Sailors continued to be used ashore for the rest of the war, especially at Drewry's Bluff.

At the end of May 1864, obstructions were removed from the James River by the Confederates, and the squadron was sent down river, only to find that the Federals had built their own barricades. The squadron continued shelling the Federals ashore at intervals until August 13, when a full naval bombardment was opened on the Federal Army.

For the rest of the year, periodic duels between the James River Squadron and the Federal shore batteries were the rule. The squadron stayed almost constantly below Drewry's Bluff. In January 1865, the James River Squadron ran past the barricades in the river in an attempt to disrupt Gen. U.S. Grant's supplies. During the fight, many of the ships were lost, others damaged to varying degrees. That night the river rose, floating the ironclads, and the James River Squadron tried to run under the cover of dark. They were spotted, and heavy fire opened up on the fleet. The order to retreat was given and the gunboats retreated.

From that point on, the navy did little other than work heavy guns in the Richmond defenses. As Richmond fell, the James River Squadron was ordered to destroy their vessels and join Gen. Robert E. Lee's army. By the time they had burned the vessels, Richmond was in flames and no road was open to join Lee. Cut off from Lee's army, they marched to the outskirts of Richmond and, finding a train there, made their way to join Gen. Joseph E. Johnston's army.

There were several men from this squadron, however, who did join Lee and fought a desperate rearguard action at the Battle of Sayler's Creek, then surrendered with the army at Appomattox. On May 1, 1865, Johnston's army, including the last of the James River Squadron, was surrendered to General William T. Sherman, and disbanded.

== Composition ==
=== Commanders ===
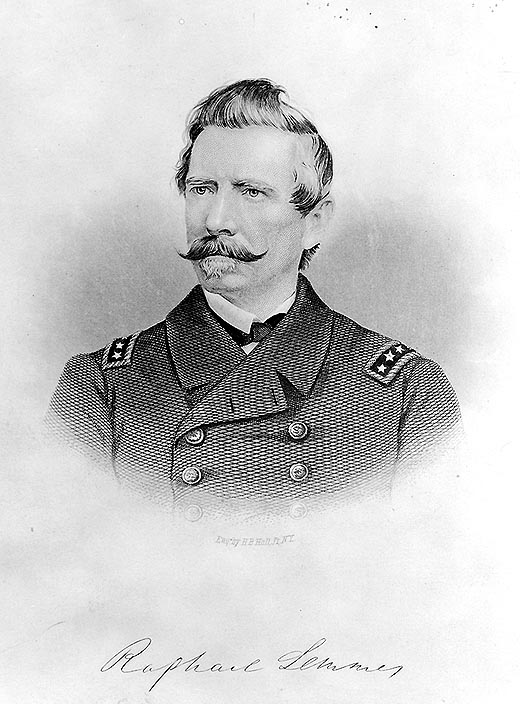
Portrait of Admiral Semmes

- Captain French Forrest (July 10, 1861 – February 27, 1862)
- Captain Franklin Buchanan (February 27 – March 29, 1862)
- Captain Josiah Tattnall III (March 29 – May 15, 1862)
- Captain John Randolph Tucker (April 19 - May 1862)
- Captain Sydney Smith Lee (May 15, 1862 – November 3, 1862)
- Captain Samuel Barron (November 3, 1862-March 1863)
- Captain French Forrest (March 24, 1863 – May 6, 1864)
- Captain John K. Mitchell (May 6, 1864 – February 18, 1865)
- Rear Admiral Raphael Semmes (February 18, 1865 - end of war)

=== Flagships ===
- CSS Patrick Henry (first flagship under Virginia Navy)
- CSS Virginia (I)
- CSS Patrick Henry (during the detachment period, and then after the destruction of the Virginia)
- CSS Virginia (II)

=== Ships of the Squadron ===
==== First phase ====
- CSS Virginia
- CSS Jamestown
- CSS Patrick Henry
- CSS Teaser
- CSS Beaufort
- CSS Raleigh
- CSS Hampton
- CSS Nansemond

==== Second phase ====
- CSS Virginia II
- CSS Richmond
- CSS Fredericksburg
- CSS Drewry
- CSS Patrick Henry
- CSS Teaser
- CSS Beaufort
- CSS Raleigh
- CSS Hampton
- CSS Nansemond
- CSS Torpedo

== See also ==
- List of ships of the Confederate States Navy
- Bibliography of American Civil War naval history
- Blockade runners of the American Civil War
