= CSS Hampton =

Coordinates: 37.377°N 77.357°W

History

Confederate States
- Name: Hampton
- Launched: 1862
- Commissioned: 1862
- Decommissioned: April 3, 1865
- Fate: Burned to prevent capture

General characteristics
- Displacement: 166 tons
- Length: 106 ft (32 m)
- Beam: 21 ft (6.4 m)
- Draft: 6 ft (1.8 m)
- Propulsion: Steam engine
- Armament: 1 9" cannon, 1 32-pounder cannon

CSS Hampton was a wooden gunboat of the Confederate States Navy, one of the few Hampton class gunboats to be built.

Hampton was built at Norfolk Naval Shipyard in 1862 and based there until May 1862, when the yard was abandoned and the fleet moved up the James River. With Lieutenant John Herndon Maury, CSN, in command, Hampton participated in significant river actions including the battle at Dutch Gap on August 13, 1864; operations against Fort Harrison on September 29-October 1; and the engagement at Chaffin's Bluff on October 22.

Hampton was burned by the Confederates as they evacuated Richmond, Virginia on April 3, 1865.

== Commanders ==
The commanders of the CSS Hampton were:

- Lieutenant George W. Harrison (as of May 1862)
- Lieutenant Hunter Davidson (1862)
- Lieutenant John S. Maury (1863-July 6, 1864; October 26–29, 1864)
- Lieutenant John W. Murdaugh (July 6-October 26, 1864)
- Lieutenant Ivey Foreman (October 29-November 18, 1864)
- Lieutenant Walter Raleigh Butt (November 18, 1864-)
- Lieutenant Francis E. Shepperd (December 28, 1864 – January 14, 1865; briefly in February 1865)
- Lieutenant Joseph David Wilson (January–February 1865)
