= CSS Drewry =

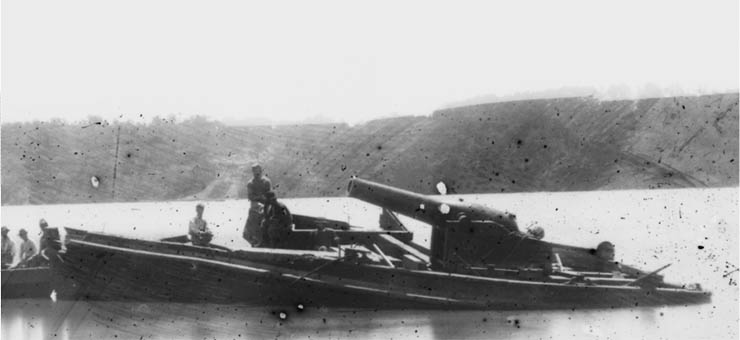
- The wreck of a Confederate gunboat on the James River in 1865, believed to be that of CSS Drewry.

History

Confederate States
- Name: Drewry
- Namesake: Drewry Fort (Fort Darling)
- Commissioned: 1863
- Decommissioned: January 24, 1865
- Fate: Destroyed by artillery fire

General characteristics
- Displacement: 166 tons
- Length: 106 ft (32 m)
- Beam: 21 ft (6.4 m)
- Draft: 5 ft (1.5 m)
- Propulsion: Steam engine
- Armament: 1 6.4" rifled cannon, 1 7" rifled cannon

CSS Drewry was a gunboat of the Confederate States Navy during the American Civil War. This wooden gunboat had a foredeck protected by an iron V-shaped shield. Classed as a tender, she was attached to Flag Officer French Forrest's James River Squadron sometime in 1863 with Master Lewis Parrish, CSN, in command.

In addition to transporting troops and other routine service, she took part in several engagements along the river prior to January 24, 1865, when, in Trent's Reach, she was destroyed by two shots from a 100-pounder rifle in a battery of the 1st Connecticut Artillery. The second hit exploded her magazine as she assisted CSS Richmond to get afloat; all but two of her crew had reached safety before the explosion. The wreck of the CSS Drewry was found by Clive Cussler in 1985, buried under the silt in upper reach of the old channel tidal flat about two hundred yards from south shore.

== Commanders ==
The commanders of the CSS Drewry were:

- William Harwar Parker (May-fall 1862)
- Master Lewis Parrish (around October 1863-May 1864)
- Lieutenant William B. Hall (May 19-May 21, 1864)
- Lieutenant William H. Wall (June 1864-January 23, 1865)

== See also ==
- Battle of Trent's Reach
