= Chaffin's Bluff =

Bluff in Virginia, United States

Coordinates: 37°25′24″N 77°23′52″W

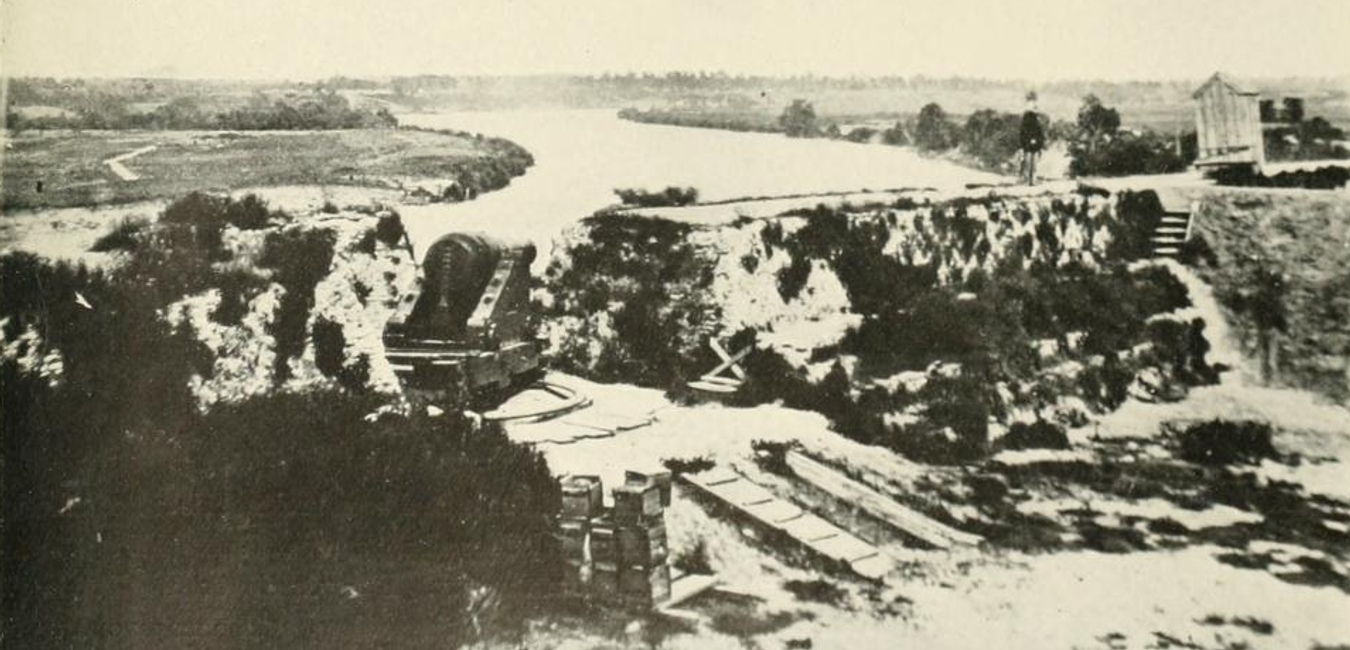
A Confederate Columbiad bears toward Chaffin's Bluff on the James River from within Fort Darling.

Chaffin's Bluff is located in Henrico County, Virginia, United States, on the north side of the James River, opposite Drewry's Bluff, long-considered a major defense point of the river below Richmond. Located at a major bend in the river about eight miles south of Richmond, both bluffs were fortified by the Confederates early in the American Civil War.

== History ==
A Union attempt to take Richmond by water by the ironclad USS Monitor and other Union warships during the Peninsula Campaign failed to get past the defenses at this location during the Battle of Drewry's Bluff on May 15, 1862.

Chaffin's Bluff and Chaffin's Farm (later renamed Fort Harrison) were adjacent to each other.

On August 15, 1864, the Federal expedition to Chaffin's Bluff and the capital's defenses was delayed and frustrated by Confederate forces. On September 30, 1864, there was another battle at Fort Harrison or Chaffin's Farm, Virginia. General Robert E. Lee had lost Fort Harrison the previous day, and led a strong counterattack, but was beaten off by the Federal forces. The battle ended major Federal attempts against Richmond from north of the James River, and the Confederates constructed new outer works between the Fort Harrison line and Richmond, while the Federals built and manned siege lines east of the Confederate capital.

On a map included in Rise and Fall of the Confederate Government, published in 1881 by Jefferson Davis, president of the late Confederate States, Chaffin's Bluff was marked as "Chapin Bluff", 8.5 miles down the James River from Richmond.

Drewry's Bluff is part of the Fort Darling unit of the Richmond National Battlefield Park.

In modern times, singer and businessman Jimmy Dean and his wife Donna Meade Dean made their home at Chaffin's Bluff, located on private property on the Henrico County side of the river. Dean died at his home there on June 13, 2010.
