= French Forrest =

American naval officer (1796–1866)

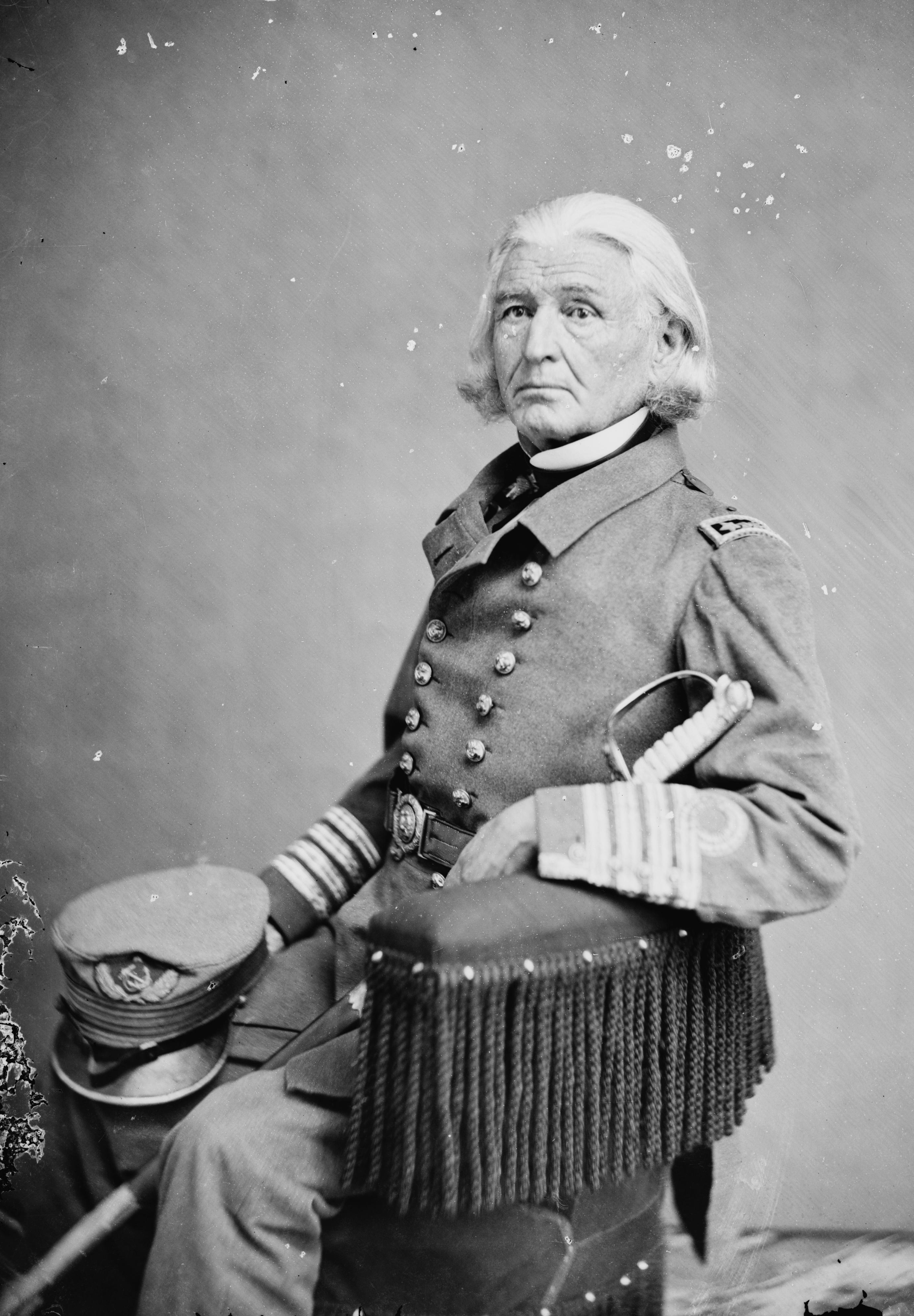
- Born: 1796; Maryland, US
- Died: December 22, 1866 (aged 69–70); Georgetown, Washington, D.C., US
- Military career
- Allegiance: United States; Virginia; Confederate States of America
- Branch: United States Navy; Virginia Naval Militia; Confederate States Navy
- Service years: 1811–1861 (USN); 1861 (Virginia Navy); 1861–1865 (CSN)
- Rank: Captain (USN); Captain (CSN)
- Commands: Naval Forces, Veracruz; Gosport (Norfolk) Shipyard; Bureau of Orders and Details; James River Squadron; Acting Assistant Secretary of the Navy
- Conflicts: War of 1812; Mexican–American War; American Civil War

French Forrest (1796 – December 22, 1866) was an American naval officer who served first in the United States Navy and later the Confederate States Navy. His combat experience prior to the American Civil War included service in the War of 1812 and the Mexican–American War.

== Biography ==
Born in Helen, Maryland, he became a midshipman on June 9, 1811 and participated in the War of 1812. He fought with Commodore Oliver Perry at the Battle of Lake Erie and was present in the action between the USS Hornet and HMS Peacock on February 24, 1813. He became a lieutenant on March 5, 1817, a commander on February 9, 1837, and a captain March 30, 1844. He was adjutant general in the Mexican–American War, and in 1847, he commanded the American naval forces in the landing at Veracruz, Mexico.

When Virginia seceded from the United States on April 17, 1861, Forrest was made its first and only flag officer in the Virginia Navy and assumed command of the Gosport Shipyard (Norfolk Naval Shipyard). When Virginia joined the Confederate States of America and merged its military on 6 June 1861, he joined the Confederate States Navy as a captain and kept his command, which he held from April 22, 1861 to May 15, 1862. In that capacity he raised and rebuilt the USS Merrimack into the casemate ironclad CSS Virginia, which he expected to command; but that job instead went to Captain Franklin Buchanan. Forrest was then replaced as the Commandant of the Gosport Shipyard, because Secretary of the Navy Mallory thought he had been too slow to repair the ex-Merrimack.

Forrest then headed to the Department of the Navy offices and became the Chief of the Bureau of Orders and Details until March 1863. He commanded the James River Squadron twice, from July 10, 1861 to February 27, 1862 (while also commandant of the shipyard) and again from March 24, 1863 to May 6, 1864 when he became the Acting Assistant Secretary of the Navy.

Forrest returned to Washington to find that his property there had been seized, and died shortly after the War in Georgetown on December 22, 1866.

Military offices
Preceded by Robert B. Pegram	Commander of the Norfolk Navy Yard; April 22, 1861 – May 15, 1862	Succeeded by Sidney Smith Lee
Preceded by none	Commander of the James River Squadron; July 10, 1861 – February 27, 1862	Succeeded by Franklin Buchanan
Preceded by Samuel Barron	Commander of the James River Squadron; March 24, 1863 – May 6, 1864	Succeeded by John K. Mitchell
