= Catesby ap Roger Jones =

United States Navy officer

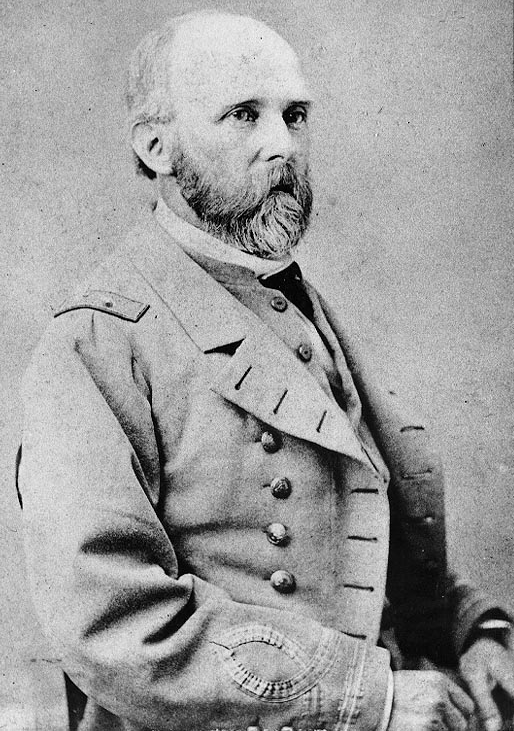
- Born: April 15, 1821; Clarke County, Virginia, United States
- Died: June 21, 1877 (aged 56); Selma, Alabama, United States
- Military career
- Allegiance: United States; Confederate States of America
- Branch: United States Navy; Confederate Navy
- Service years: 1836–1861 (USN); 1861–1865 (CSN)
- Rank: Lieutenant (USN); Commander (CSN)
- Conflicts: American Civil War

Catesby ap Roger Jones (April 15, 1821 – June 21, 1877) was an American naval officer who was a commander in the Confederate Navy during the American Civil War. He assumed command of CSS Virginia during the Battle of Hampton Roads and engaged USS Monitor in the historic first battle of the two ironclads.

== Biography ==
Jones was born in Clarke County, Virginia, son of Major General Roger ap Catesby Jones and Mary Ann Mason. His mother was a lineal descendant of William Byrd II of Westover and Robert "King" Carter, making her also a cousin of General Robert E. Lee. His uncle was Thomas ap Catesby Jones, a naval officer during the War of 1812 and Mexican–American War. Jones was appointed a midshipman in the United States Navy in 1836, and served extensively at sea, receiving promotion to the rank of lieutenant in 1849. During the 1850s, Jones was involved in development work on navy weapons and served as ordnance officer on the new steam frigate Merrimack when she began active service in 1856.

When Virginia left the Union in April 1861, Lieutenant Jones resigned his U.S. Navy commission, joining the Virginia State Navy soon thereafter and becoming a Confederate Navy lieutenant in June. In 1861–62, he was employed in converting the steam frigate USS Merrimack into an ironclad and was the ship's executive officer when she was commissioned as Virginia. During the Battle of Hampton Roads, when her commanding officer, Captain Franklin Buchanan, was wounded in the March 8, 1862 attack on USS Cumberland and Congress, Jones temporarily took command, leading the ship during her historic engagement with USS Monitor on the following day. Later in 1862, he commanded a shore battery at Drewry's Bluff, on the James River, and the gunboat Chattahoochee while she was under construction at Saffold, Georgia.

For his "gallant and meritorious conduct" during the battles of Hampton Roads and Drewry's Bluff, Jones was promoted to the rank of commander on April 29, 1863. Jones was sent to Selma, Alabama, to take charge of the Ordnance Works there. For the rest of the Civil War, he supervised the manufacture of badly needed heavy guns for the Confederate armed forces. With the end of the conflict in May 1865, Jones went into private business. After working in South America, he made his residence in Selma, Alabama. On June 20, 1877, he was shot by a 10-year-old boy after he intervened in a quarrel between his 7-year-old son and the other boy. He died in Selma the following morning.

Catesby ap Roger Jones is buried in the historic Old Live Oak Cemetery at Selma, Alabama.

== See also ==
- John Taylor Wood, served under Jones on CSS Virginia
