= Virginia State Navy =

A Virginia State Navy (or Virginia Navy) existed twice. During the American Revolutionary War, the provisional government of the Virginia Colony authorized the purchase, outfitting, and manning of armed vessels to protect the colony's waters from threats posed it by the Royal Navy.

Early in the American Civil War, after the state of Virginia seceded from the Union on April 17, 1861, it briefly had naval forces of its own known as the Virginia State Navy, which existed in tandem to the Provisional Army of Virginia. Both of these forces had been absorbed by the Confederate States Navy and the Confederate Army by the end of 1861.

== American Revolutionary War ==
Virginia, along with the other Thirteen Colonies, was increasingly dissatisfied with the actions of Lord Dunmore, the royal governor of the colony. After the Gunpowder Incident in April 1775 and the news of the war's outbreak with the Battles of Lexington and Concord, Dunmore, fearing for his safety, fled with his family to a Royal Navy ship. There Dunmore tried to organize Loyalists in the colony to counter the rebellion.

In December 1775, the provisional assembly voted to authorize the Committee of Safety to buy, arm, and man ships to prevent the royal governor from travelling over the waterways. During the next six months, the committee purchased five ships, and ordered the construction of several more. It also commissioned its first captains: James Barron, Richard Barron, Richard Taylor, Thomas Lilly, and Edward Travis. In May 1776, the assembly established a Navy Board to oversee naval affairs, and established an admiralty court. Its ships were built across the state, but eventually this became the responsibility of the shipyard on the Chickahominy River and at Gosport. In 1779 the Navy Board was superseded by a Board of War, with merchant vessels regulated by a Board of Trade. This lasted only one year, however, and Virginia established a Commissioner of War, a Commercial Agent, and a Commissioner of the Navy to coordinate her military and trade activities.

The fleet's first commodore was John Henry Boucher, who was hired from the Maryland State Navy. His service was brief, and he was followed by Walter Brooke, and finally James Barron, who led the fleet until the end of the war. Virginia had difficulty recruiting enough men for her navy, due to the higher pay on privateers and also shortage of skilled seamen. (Virginia did not authorize privateering, instead issuing letters of marque covered by the Second Continental Congress.)

=== Operations ===
The Virginia fleet primarily patrolled the Chesapeake Bay, and was perpetually undermanned and poorly armed. Some of the ships were used in commerce, sent on voyages to the West Indies and even Europe. Between 1775 and 1779 the fleet captured 15 prizes, but also lost several ships the same way. The British raided the shipyard at Gosport in 1779, destroying stores and several unfinished vessels.

The arrival of British forces in South Carolina in 1780, and increased raiding activities by the British in Chesapeake Bay created increased demand for naval defense, and Virginia had to resort to the impressment of seamen. After a British fleet landed troops led by turncoat Benedict Arnold in December 1780, Virginia in desperation hired privateers to assist the Navy. Even so, Arnold advanced up the James River as far as Richmond. A fleet of over twenty small Virginia ships and privateers pursued him, and in a one-sided engagement in April 1781 (the action at Osborne's), the British captured twelve and the rest were either scuttled or burned. The

The disaster on the James left the Virginia Navy with a single ship, the Liberty. She supported operations that resulted in the Siege of Yorktown later in 1781, as did three additional ships hired by the state. When Cornwallis was forced to surrender at Yorktown, Virginia, citing financial reasons, discharged most of its seamen. A few ships were fitted out in 1782 and 1783, but with the conclusion of the 1783 Treaty of Paris, all but two were sold. The Liberty and the Patriot were retained as revenue cutters into 1787. The Liberty was one of the longest-serving ships of the Patriot cause in the war.

== American Civil War ==
The Provisional Navy of Virginia was established by an ordinance of the Convention of Virginia on April 27, 1861, when Virginia seceded from the Union. The ordinance called for the enlistment of two thousand seamen and marines to serve terms of three and four years respectively. As a result of a shortage of warships, most of these seamen were employed in the construction and manning of harbor and coastal defense batteries. When Virginia joined the Confederate States of America, Governor John Letcher issued a proclamation on 6 June 1861, transferring "all officers, seamen, and marines of the Provisional Navy of Virginia" and they were absorbed into the Confederate States Navy. One of the Virginia's first actions following secession was to appoint Robert E. Lee as commander in chief of the military and naval forces of Virginia.

The only flag officer of the second Virginia Navy was Commodore French Forrest, a former officer of the United States Navy. Its headquarters were the naval base at Norfolk, Virginia, which had been abandoned by Union forces on April 20, 1861.

=== Noteworthy officers ===
Former members of the United States Navy who would play a significant role in the American Civil War:

- Samuel Barron
- John Mercer Brooke
- Franklin Buchanan (commanded the ironclads CSS Virginia II and CSS Tennessee)
- French Forrest
- Catesby ap Roger Jones
- Sydney Smith Lee
- William Francis Lynch
- Matthew Fontaine Maury
- Robert Dabney Minor (flag officer in the 1st attack by the ironclad CSS Virginia II)
- Thomas J. Page
- William Harwar Parker
- Robert B. Pegram
- Thomas R. Rootes
- James H. Rochelle
- John Randolph Tucker
- William C. Whittle

=== Ships in service ===
In order to create a navy to defend Richmond, the Navy Department salvaged the frigate USS United States, which became a receiving ship. Additionally, Virginia purchased several steamers including the Empire, Northampton, Thomas Reaney, Jamestown, and the Yorktown, which was renamed Patrick Henry as the flagship of the James River Squadron.

At the time when it turned over its military to the Confederate States, the Virginia Navy had the following ships:

- USS United States, rechristened CSS Confederate States
- CSS George Page
- CSS Logan
- CSS Northampton
- CSS Teaser
- CSS Jamestown
- CSS Patrick Henry
