= CSS Virginia =

Civil War Confederate ironclad

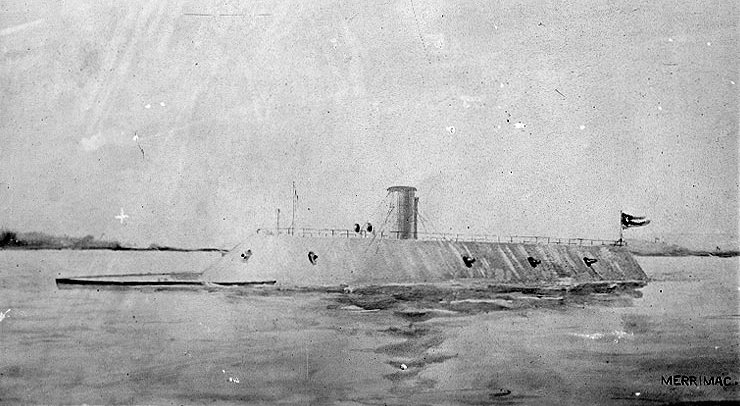
- CSS Virginia

History

Confederate States
- Name: CSS Virginia
- Namesake: Virginia
- Ordered: July 11, 1861
- Completed: March 7, 1862
- Commissioned: February 17, 1862
- Nickname(s): The Rebel Monster
- Fate: Scuttled May 11, 1862 (36°54′25″N 76°20′37″W)

General characteristics
- Type: Casemate ironclad
- Displacement: about 4,000 long tons (4,100 t)
- Length: 275 ft (83.8 m)
- Beam: 51 ft 2 in (15.6 m)
- Draft: 21 ft (6.4 m)
- Installed power: 1,200 ihp (890 kW)
- Propulsion: 1 shaft; 2 Horizontal back-acting steam engines; 4 boilers
- Speed: 5–6 knots (9.3–11.1 km/h; 5.8–6.9 mph)
- Complement: about 320 officers and men
- Armament: 2 × 7-inch (178 mm) Brooke rifles; 2 × 6.4-inch (160 mm) Brooke rifles; 6 × 9-inch (229 mm) Dahlgren smoothbores; 2 × 12-pounder (5 kg) howitzers
- Armor: Belt: 1–3 in (25–76 mm); Deck: 1 in (25 mm); Casemate: 4 in (102 mm)

CSS Virginia was the first steam-powered ironclad warship built by the Confederate States Navy during the first year of the American Civil War. She was constructed as a casemate ironclad using the razéed (cut down) original lower hull and engines of the scuttled steam frigate USS Merrimack. Virginia was one of the participants in the Battle of Hampton Roads, opposing the Union's USS Monitor in March 1862. The battle is chiefly significant in naval history as the first battle between ironclads.

== USS Merrimack becomes CSS Virginia ==
When the Commonwealth of Virginia seceded from the Union in 1861, one of the important US military bases threatened was Gosport Navy Yard (now Norfolk Naval Shipyard) in Portsmouth, Virginia. Accordingly, orders were sent to destroy the base rather than allow it to fall into Confederate hands. On the afternoon of 17 April, the day Virginia seceded, Engineer in Chief B. F. Isherwood managed to get the frigate's engines lit. However, the previous night secessionists had sunk light boats between Craney Island and Sewell's Point, blocking the channel. On 20 April, before evacuating the Navy Yard, the U. S. Navy burned Merrimack to the waterline and sank her to preclude capture. When the Confederate government took possession of the fully provisioned yard, the base's new commander, Flag Officer French Forrest, contracted on May 18 to salvage the wreck of the frigate. This was completed by May 30, and she was towed into the shipyard's only dry dock (today known as Drydock Number One), where the burned structures were removed.

The wreck was surveyed and her lower hull and machinery were discovered to be undamaged. Stephen Mallory, Secretary of the Navy decided to convert Merrimack into an ironclad, since she was the only large ship with intact engines available in the Chesapeake Bay area. Preliminary sketch designs were submitted by Lieutenants John Mercer Brooke and John L. Porter, each of whom envisaged the ship as a casemate ironclad. Brooke's general design showed the bow and stern portions submerged, and his design was the one finally selected. The detailed design work would be completed by Porter, who was a trained naval constructor. Porter had overall responsibility for the conversion, but Brooke was responsible for her iron plate and heavy ordnance, while William P. Williamson, Chief Engineer of the Navy, was responsible for the ship's machinery.

=== Reconstruction as an ironclad ===
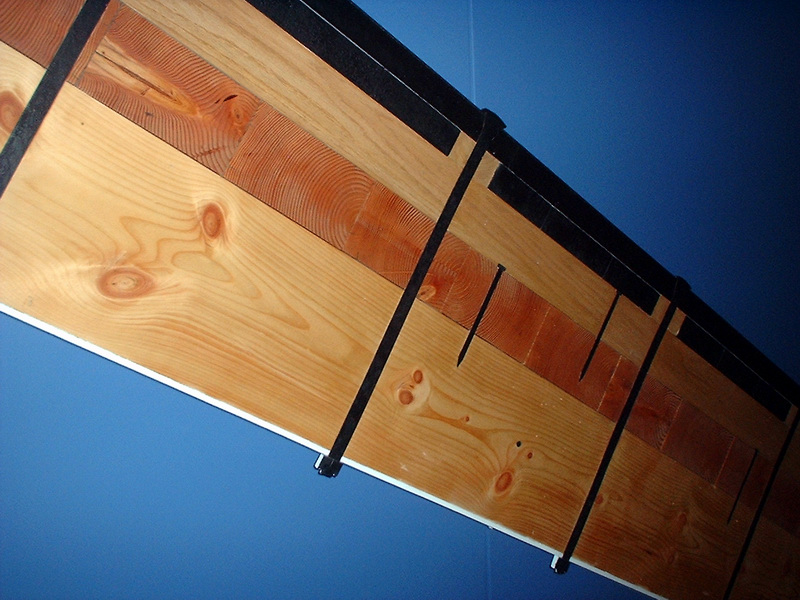
Display showing 4 inches (102 mm) of iron armor backed by 24 inches (610 mm) of wood

The hull's burned timbers were cut down past the vessel's original waterline, leaving just enough clearance to accommodate her large, twin-bladed screw propeller. A new fantail and armored casemate were built atop a new main deck, and a v-shaped breakwater (bulwark) was added to her bow, which attached to the armored casemate. This forward and aft main deck and fantail were designed to stay submerged and were covered in 4-inch-thick (10 cm) iron plate, built up in two layers. The casemate was built of 24 inches (61 cm) of oak and pine in several layers, topped with two 2-inch (51 mm) layers of iron plating oriented perpendicular to each other, and angled at 36 degrees from horizontal to deflect fired enemy shells.

From reports in Northern newspapers, Virginia's designers were aware of the Union plans to build an ironclad and assumed their similar ordnance would be unable to do much serious damage to such a ship. It was decided to equip their ironclad with a ram, an anachronism on a 19th-century warship. Merrimack's steam engines, now part of Virginia, were in poor working order; they had been slated for replacement when the decision was made to abandon the Norfolk naval yard. The salty Elizabeth River water and the addition of tons of iron armor and pig iron ballast, added to the hull's unused spaces for needed stability after her initial refloat, and to submerge her unarmored lower levels, only added to her engines' propulsion issues. As completed, Virginia had a turning radius of about 1 mile (1.6 km) and required 45 minutes to complete a full circle, which would later prove to be a major handicap in battle with the far more nimble Monitor.

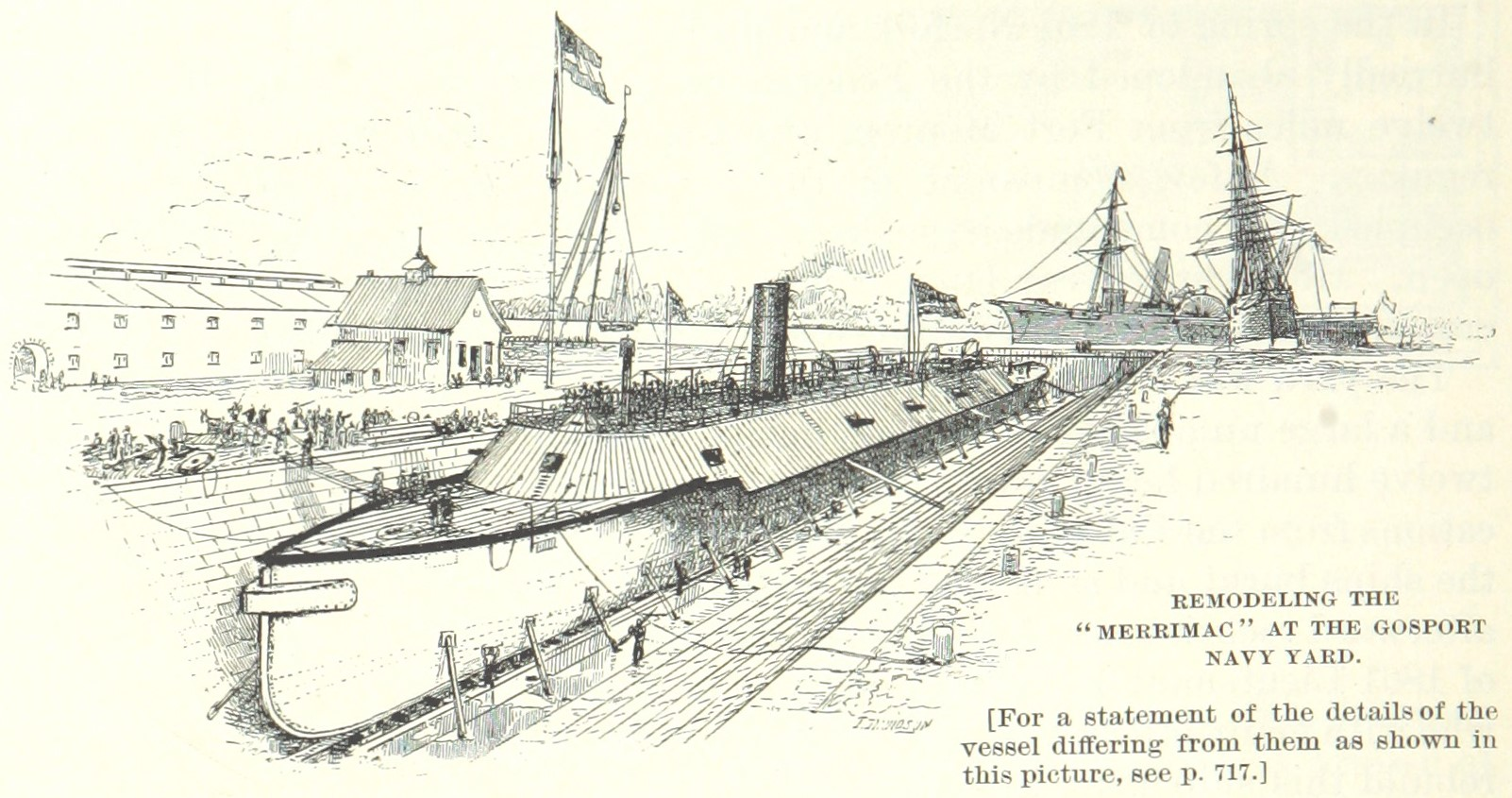
Merrimack is rebuilt into Virginia

The ironclad's casemate had 14 gun ports, three each in the bow and stern, one firing directly along the ship's centerline, the two others angled at 45° from the center line; these six bow and stern gun ports had exterior iron shutters installed to protect their cannon. There were four gun ports on each broadside; their protective iron shutters remained uninstalled during both days of the Battle of Hampton Roads. Virginia's battery consisted of four muzzle-loading single-banded Brooke rifles and six smoothbore 9-inch (229 mm) Dahlgren guns salvaged from the old Merrimack. Two of the rifles, the bow and stern pivot guns, were 7-inch (178 mm) caliber and weighed 14,500 pounds (6,600 kg) each. They fired a 104-pound (47 kg) shell. The other two were 6.4-inch (163 mm) cannon of about 9,100 pounds (4,100 kg), one on each broadside. The 9-inch Dahlgrens were mounted three to a side; each weighed approximately 9,200 pounds (4,200 kg) and could fire a 72.5-pound (32.9 kg) shell up to a range of 3,357 yards (3,070 m) (or 1.9 miles) at an elevation of 15°. Both amidship Dahlgrens nearest the boiler furnaces were fitted-out to fire heated shot. On her upper casemate deck were positioned two anti-boarding/personnel 12-pounder Howitzers.

Virginia's commanding officer, Flag Officer Franklin Buchanan, arrived to take command only a few days before her first sortie; the ironclad was placed in commission and equipped by her executive officer, Lieutenant Catesby ap Roger Jones.

== Battle of Hampton Roads ==
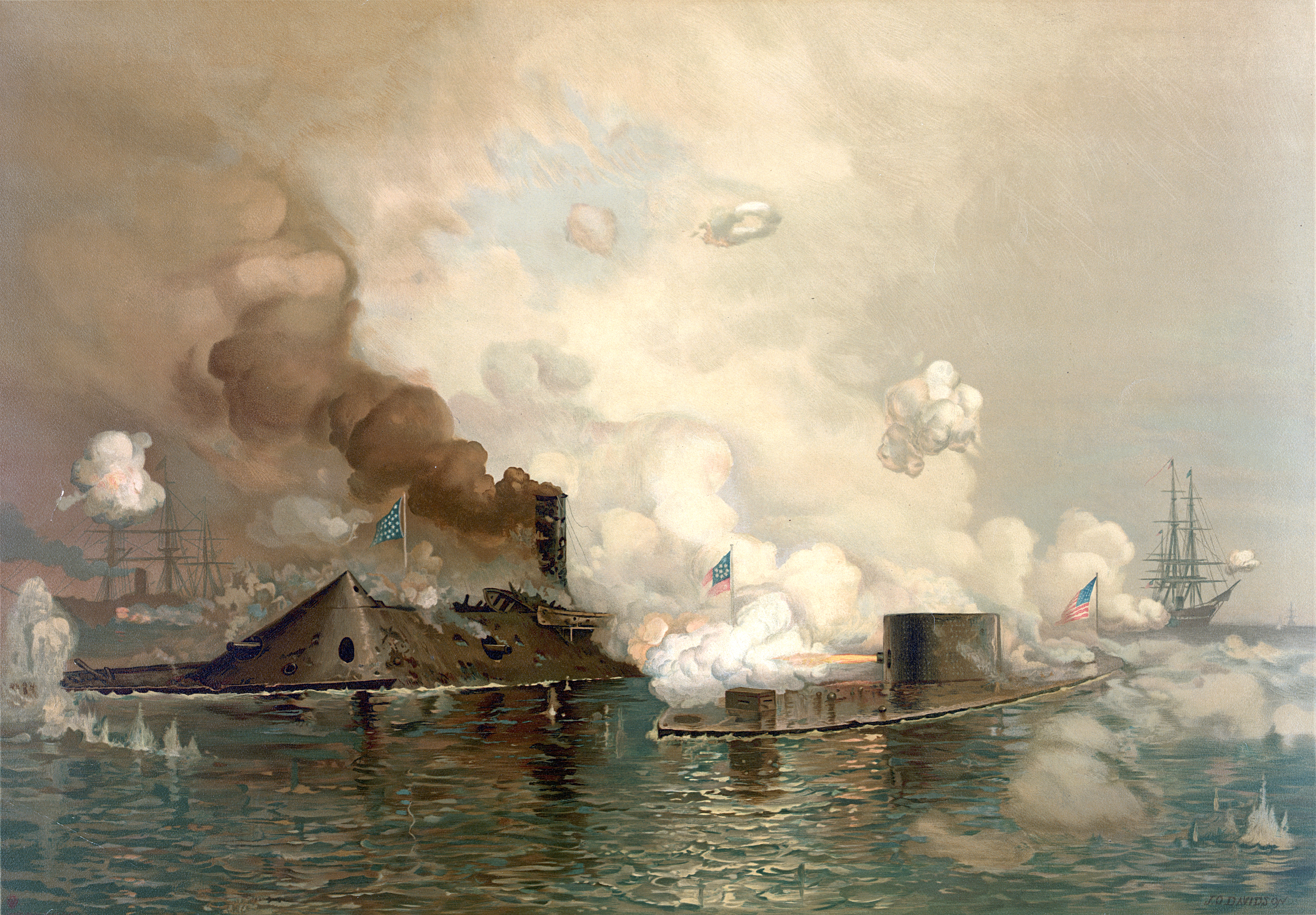
Chromolithograph depicting the Battle of Hampton Roads

The Battle of Hampton Roads began on March 8, 1862, when Virginia engaged the blockading Union fleet. Despite an all-out effort to complete her, the new ironclad still had workmen on board when she sailed into Hampton Roads with her flotilla of five CSN support ships: Raleigh (serving as Virginia's tender) and Beaufort, Patrick Henry, Jamestown, and Teaser.

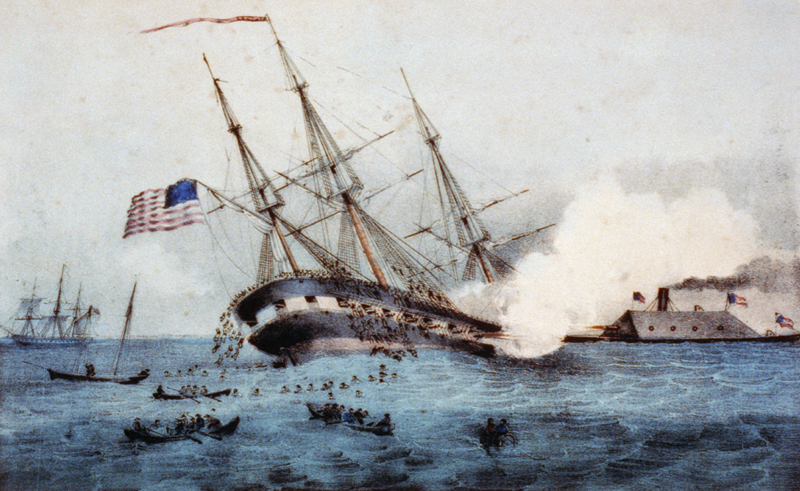
CSS Virginia ramming and sinking USS Cumberland

The first Union ship to be engaged by Virginia was the all-wood, sail-powered USS Cumberland, which was first crippled during a furious cannon exchange, and then rammed in her forward starboard bow by Virginia. As Cumberland began to sink, the port side half of Virginia's iron ram was broken off, causing a bow leak in the ironclad. Seeing what had happened to Cumberland, the captain of USS Congress ordered his frigate into shallower water, where she soon grounded. Congress and Virginia traded cannon fire for an hour, after which the badly damaged Congress finally surrendered. While the surviving crewmen of Congress were being ferried off the ship, a Union battery on the north shore opened fire on Virginia, killing multiple crew aboard. Outraged at such a breach of war protocol, in retaliation Virginia's now angry captain, Commodore Franklin Buchanan, gave the order to open fire with hot-shot on the surrendered Congress as he rushed to Virginia's exposed upper casemate deck, where he was injured by enemy rifle fire. Congress, now set ablaze by the retaliatory shelling, burned for many hours into the night, a symbol of Confederate naval power and a costly wake-up call for the all-wood Union blockading squadron.

Virginia did not emerge from the battle unscathed, however. Her hanging port side anchor was lost after ramming Cumberland; the bow was leaking from the loss of the ram's port side half; shot from Cumberland, Congress, and the shore-based Union batteries had riddled her smokestack, reducing her boilers' draft and already slow speed; two of her broadside cannon (without shutters) were put out of commission by shell hits; a number of her armor plates had been loosened; both of Virginia's 22-foot (6.7 m) cutters had been shot away, as had both 12-pounder anti-boarding/anti-personnel howitzers, most of the deck stanchions, railings, and both flagstaffs. Even so, the now-injured Buchanan ordered an attack on USS Minnesota, which had run aground on a sandbar trying to escape Virginia. However, because of the ironclad's 22-foot (6.7 m) draft (fully loaded), she was unable to get close enough to do any significant damage. It being late in the day, Virginia retired from the conflict with the expectation of returning the next day and completing the destruction of the remaining Union blockaders.

Later that night, USS Monitor arrived at Union-held Fort Monroe. She had been rushed to Hampton Roads, still not quite complete, all the way from the Brooklyn Navy Yard, in hopes of defending the force of wooden ships and preventing "the rebel monster" from further threatening the Union's blockading fleet and nearby cities, like Washington, D.C. While under tow, she nearly foundered twice during heavy storms on her voyage south, arriving in Hampton Roads by the bright firelight from the still-burning Congress.

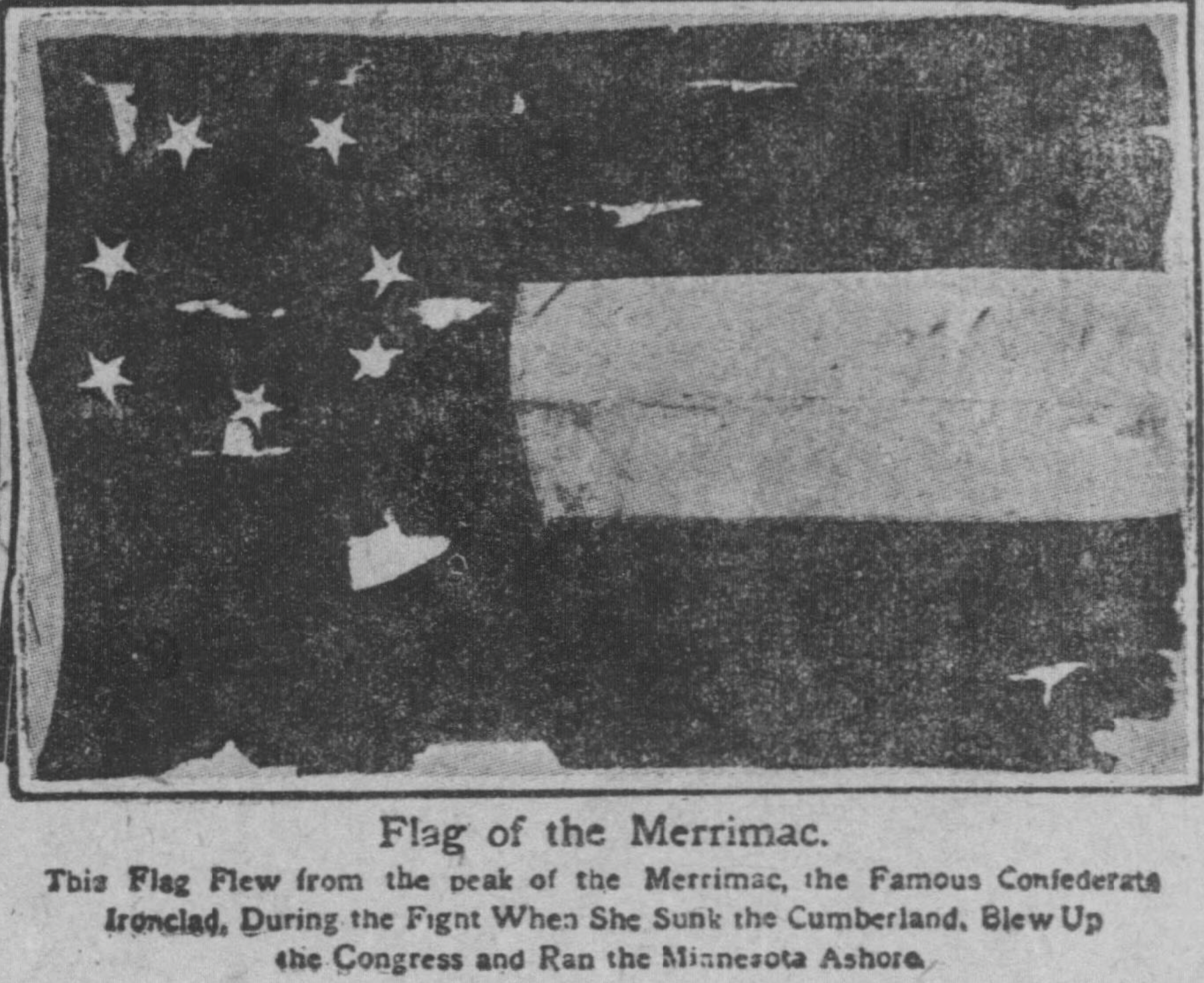
Ship's flag

The next day, on March 9, 1862, the world's first battle between ironclads took place. The smaller, nimbler, and faster Monitor was able to outmaneuver the larger, slower Virginia, but neither ship proved able to do any severe damage to the other, despite numerous shell hits by both combatants, many fired at virtually point-blank range. Monitor had a much lower freeboard and only its single, rotating, two-cannon gun turret and forward pilothouse sitting above her deck, and thus was much harder to hit with Virginia's heavy cannon. After hours of shell exchanges, Monitor finally retreated into shallower water after a direct shell hit to her armored pilothouse forced her away from the conflict to assess the damage. The captain of the Monitor, Lieutenant John L. Worden, had taken a direct gunpowder explosion to his face and eyes, blinding him, while looking through the pilothouse's narrow, horizontal viewing slits. Monitor remained in the shallows, but as it was late in the day, Virginia steamed for her home port, the battle ending without a clear victor. The captain of Virginia that day, Lieutenant Catesby ap Roger Jones, received advice from his pilots to depart over the sandbar toward Norfolk until the next day. Lieutenant Jones wanted to continue the fight, but the pilots emphasized that the Virginia had "nearly three miles to run to the bar" and that she could not remain and "take the ground on a falling tide." To prevent running aground, Lieutenant Jones reluctantly moved the ironclad back toward port. Virginia retired to the Gosport Naval Yard at Portsmouth, Virginia, and remained in drydock for repairs until April 4, 1862.

In the following month, the crew of Virginia were unsuccessful in their attempts to break the Union blockade. The blockade had been bolstered by the hastily ram-fitted paddle steamer USS Vanderbilt, and SS Illinois as well as the SS Arago and USS Minnesota, which had been repaired. Virginia made several sorties back over to Hampton Roads hoping to draw Monitor into battle. Monitor, however, was under strict orders not to re-engage; the two combatants would never battle again.

On April 11, the Confederate Navy sent Lieutenant Joseph Nicholson Barney, in command of the paddle side-wheeler CSS Jamestown, along with Virginia and five other ships in full view of the Union squadron, enticing them to fight. When it became clear that Union Navy ships were unwilling to fight, the CS Navy squadron moved in and captured three merchant ships, the brigs Marcus and Sabout and the schooner Catherine T. Dix. Their ensigns were then hoisted "Union-side down" to further taunt the Union Navy into a fight, as they were towed back to Norfolk, with the help of CSS Raleigh.

By late April, the new Union ironclads USRC E. A. Stevens and USS Galena had also joined the blockade. On May 8, 1862, Virginia and the James River Squadron ventured out when the Union ships began shelling the Confederate fortifications near Norfolk, but the Union ships retired under the shore batteries on the north side of the James River and on Rip Raps island.

== Destruction ==
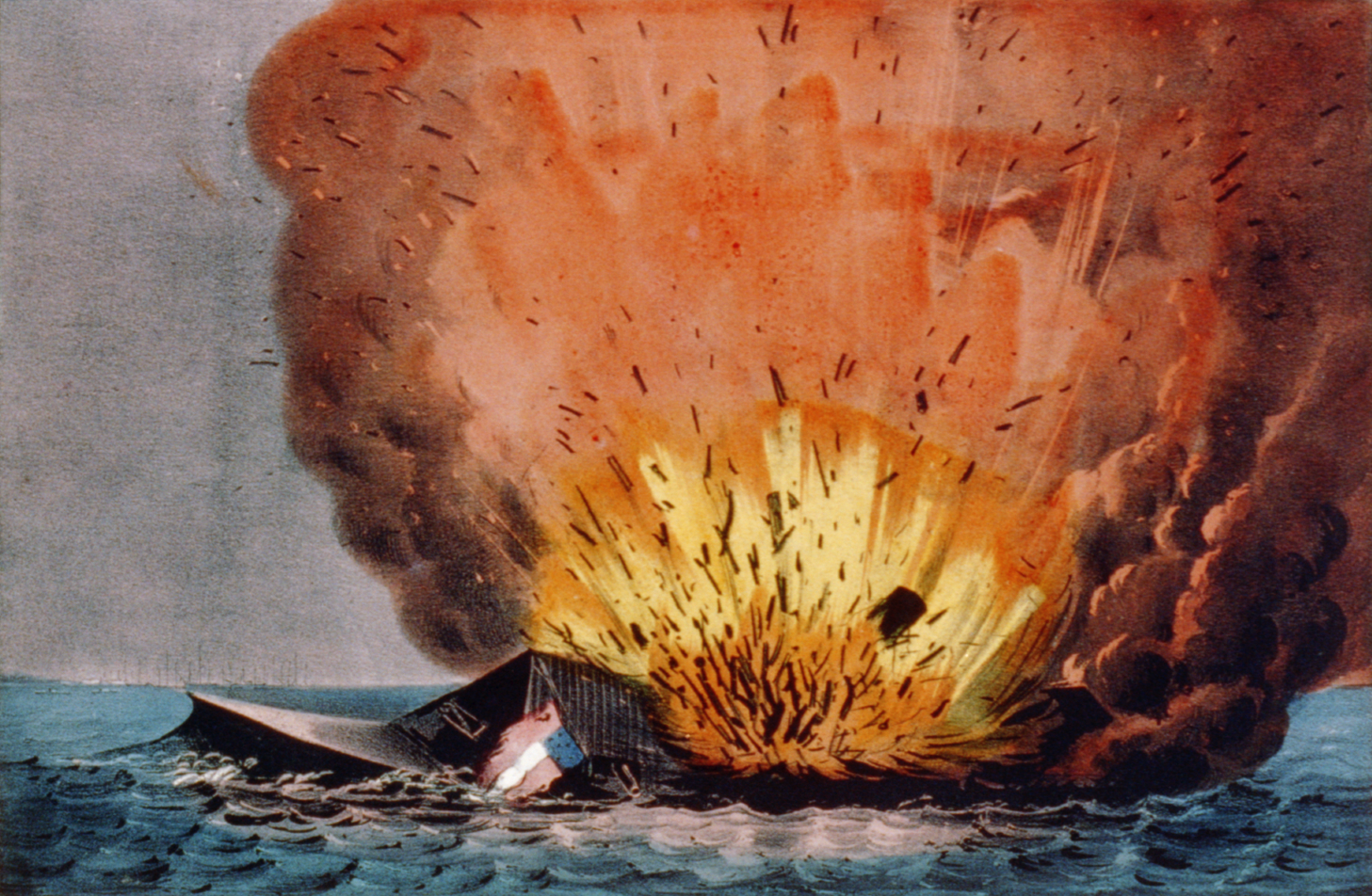
Destruction of the Rebel Monster Merrimac off Craney Island, May 11, 1862, by Currier and Ives

On May 10, 1862, advancing Union troops occupied Norfolk. Since Virginia was now a steam-powered heavy battery and no longer an ocean-going cruiser, her pilots judged her not seaworthy enough to enter the Atlantic, even if she were able to pass the Union blockade. Virginia was also unable to retreat further up the James River due to her deep 22-foot (6.7 m) draft (fully loaded). In an attempt to reduce it, supplies and coal were dumped overboard, even though this exposed the ironclad's unarmored lower hull, but this was still not enough to make a difference. Without a home port and no place to go, Virginia's new captain, flag officer Josiah Tattnall III, reluctantly ordered her destruction in order to keep the ironclad from being captured. The ship was destroyed by Catesby Jones and John Taylor Wood, who set fire to scattered gunpowder and cotton strewn across the ship's deck. Early on the morning of May 11, 1862, off Craney Island, the fire reached the ironclad's magazine, leading to a massive explosion that obliterated the ship. What remained of Virginia then sank to the harbor floor.

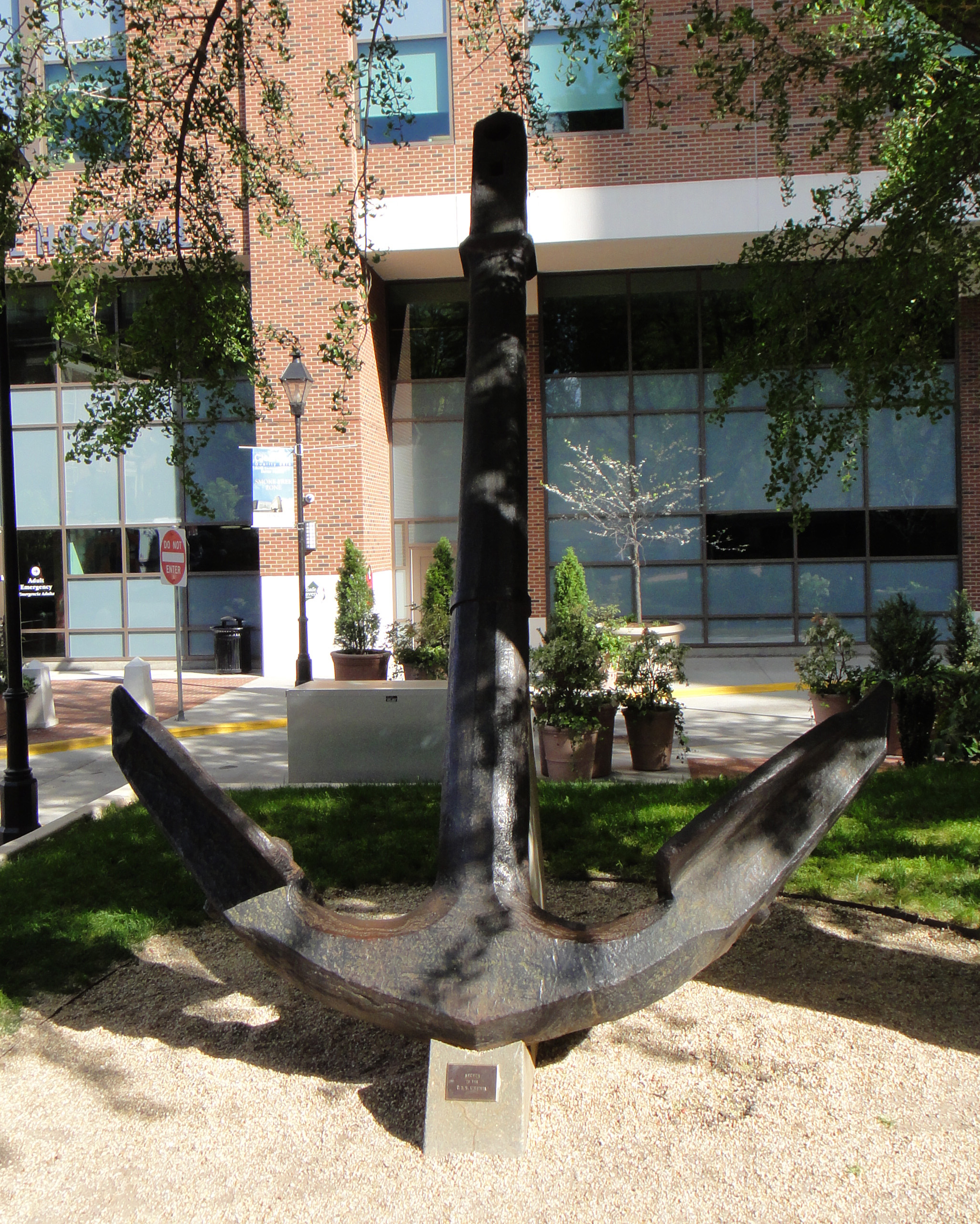
Anchor of CSS Virginia at its former location at the American Civil War Museum

After the war, the government determined that the wreck of Virginia needed to be removed from the channel. In 1867, Captain D. A. Underdown salvaged 290,000 pounds of iron from the site, much of which was taken from the ship's ram and cannons. The following year, Underdown detonated explosives under the Virginia's hulk to fully clear the river, but the attempt did not totally remove the wreck. In 1871, E. J. Griffith recovered an additional 102,883 pounds of iron from the seabed, and in 1876, the "remaining timbers" of the ship were raised. In 1982, the National Underwater and Marine Agency explored the area around Craney Island and found that "there are no large areas of either concentrated or scattered debris associated with the Virginia lying on the river bottom within the survey area."

Most of the recovered iron was melted down and sold for scrap (notably, some of the ship's iron was used to craft Pokahuntas Bell in 1907). Other pieces of the ship have been preserved in museums: The ship's brass bell is held at the Hampton Roads Naval Museum, and one of the Virginia's anchors now rests in front of the American Civil War Museum in Richmond. Numerous souvenirs, ostensibly made from salvaged iron and wood raised from Virginia's sunken hulk, have found a ready and willing market among Civil War enthusiasts and eastern seaboard residents. However, the provenance of many of these artifacts is impossible to prove, which has given rise to the humorous adage that "if you took all the iron and all the wood supposedly collected from the [wreck of the CSS Virginia], you'd have enough to outfit a fleet of ironclads."

== Historical names ==
Although the Confederacy renamed the ship, she is still frequently referred to by her Union name. When she was first commissioned into the United States Navy in 1856, her name was Merrimack, with the K; the name was derived from the Merrimack River near where she was built. She was the second ship of the U. S. Navy to be named for the Merrimack River, which is formed by the confluence of the Pemigewasset and Winnipesaukee rivers at Franklin, New Hampshire. The Merrimack flows south across New Hampshire, then eastward across northeastern Massachusetts before finally emptying in the Atlantic at Newburyport, Massachusetts.

After raising, restoring, and outfitting as an ironclad warship, the Confederacy bestowed on her the name Virginia. Nonetheless, the Union continued to refer to the Confederate ironclad by either its original name, Merrimack, or by the nickname "The Rebel Monster". In the aftermath of the Battle of Hampton Roads, the names Virginia and Merrimack were used interchangeably by both sides, as attested to by various newspapers and correspondence of the day. Navy reports and pre-1900 historians frequently misspelled the name as "Merrimac", which was actually an unrelated ship, hence "the Battle of the Monitor and the Merrimac". Both spellings are still in use in the Hampton Roads area.

== Memorial, heritage ==
- A large exhibit at the Jamestown Exposition held in 1907 at Sewell's Point was the "Battle of the Merrimac and Monitor," a large diorama that was housed in a special building.
- A small community in Montgomery County, Virginia, near where the coal burned by the Confederate ironclad was mined, is now known as Merrimac.
- The name of the Monitor-Merrimac Memorial Bridge-Tunnel, built in Hampton Roads in the general vicinity of the famous engagement, with both Virginia and federal funds.

== See also ==
- Bibliography of American Civil War naval history
