= Confederate States Department of the Navy =

- Seal of the Department of the Navy

Agency overview
- Formed: February 21, 1861
- Dissolved: May 20, 1865
- Jurisdiction: Confederate States Navy; Confederate States Marine Corps
- Headquarters: Richmond, Virginia, U.S.
- Agency executive: Stephen R. Mallory, Secretary of the Navy

The Department of the Navy was the Confederate Civil Service department responsible for the administration of the affairs of the Confederate States Navy and Marine Corps. It was officially established on February 21, 1861.

== History ==
The Department of the Navy was established by an act of the Provisional Confederate Congress in Montgomery, Alabama which passed into law on February 21, 1861. This act also established the position of Secretary of the Navy which was according to the act authorized to handle all affairs related to the navies of the Confederacy. President Jefferson Davis nominated Stephen R. Mallory and he was confirmed by Congress. On May 9, 1862, Mallory issued orders to James D. Bulloch instructing him to proceed to London, England to act as the Confederacy's agent in securing six new vessels, armaments, and supplies for the nascent Confederate Navy. These orders granted Bulloch a wide berth of discretion in the selection of these ships, but specified that these ships must be suitable for the commerce raiding. Furthermore, the orders specified that at least one Armstrong breech-loading rifled cannon be acquired for each vessel. An amendment to this act passed on May 21, 1861 granted the Department of the Navy the power to grant patents concerning armed vessels, floating batteries, or other defenses.

== Organization ==
=== Key personnel ===
==== Office of the Secretary ====
Key positions of the Department of the Navy included:

- Secretary of the Navy, Stephen R. Mallory (March 4, 1861 to May 20, 1865)
- Chief Constructor: Position established on April 30, 1863

John L. Porter (April 30, 1863 - April 1865)

- Engineer in Chief: Position established on April 21, 1862

William P. Williamson (April 21, 1862-April 1865)

- Naval Aide to the President

John Taylor Wood (1863 - May 1865)

- Register of the Navy: Established on April 4, 1863

James S. Jones

==== Naval Agents in Europe ====
- James D. Bulloch (June 11, 1861 - April 1865)
- James H. North (May 17, 1861 -April 1865)
- George T. Sinclair (May 7, 1861 -April 28, 1865)
- Matthew F. Maury (September 20, 1862 - April 1865)
- Samuel Barron (August 29, 1863 - March 1865)

=== Offices and Bureaus ===
Important Bureaus and Offices of Department of the Navy included:

==== Office of Special Service ====
The Office of Special Service was responsible for the construction of wooden gunboats.

==== Bureau of Orders and Details ====
The Bureau of Orders and Details was responsible for the administration of personnel affairs of the Navy. This included the postings of officers and crews to ships, recruitment for the Navy, and the determination of promotions. Captain William F. Lynch was Chief of the Bureau in 1862 and Captain French Forrest in 1862 to 1863.

==== Bureau of Ordnance and Hydrography ====
The Bureau was led by Commander John M. Brooke from 1863 to the Civil War's conclusion.

==== Torpedo Bureau ====
The Confederate Torpedo Bureau was not part of the Navy Department. It was part of the War Department; i.e., the army. The Submarine Battery Service comprised the navy's torpedo specialists. It was created 31 October 1862 and originally commanded by Commander Matthew Fontaine Maury. The Submarine Battery Service primarily utilized electrically-detonated torpedoes to protect the South's waterways.

==== Office of Provisions and Clothing ====
The Bureau of Provisions and Clothing, later the Office of Provisions and Clothing, was charged with supplying ships with food and clothing.

==== Office of Medicine and Surgery ====
The Bureau of Medicine and Surgery was responsible for the operation of several medical facilities in Southern ports. This department was managed by William A. W. Spotswood throughout its entire existence from April 10, 1861 to April 1865.

==== Marine Corps ====
The Marine Corps was established by an act of the Provisional Congress on March 16, 1861. As originally legislated the Marine Corps was to be a battalion-sized force of six companies and a headquarters element led by a major. The Marine Corps was later expanded into a regiment following an act of the Provisional Congress on May 20, 1861; this was spurred on by the secession of Arkansas, North Carolina, Tennessee, and Virginia. The newly expanded legion was authorized to consist of 1,000 men. The first Commandant of the Corps was Colonel Lloyd J. Beall who was appointed to that capacity on May 23. On June 1, 1861 the Virginia Marine Corps was incorporated into the Confederate States Marine Corps. In 1862, the first Confederate Congress appropriated a budget of CS$243,322 for the operation of the Marine Corps.

== See also ==
- Confederate States Navy
- Confederate States Secretary of the Navy
