= George Bland =

George Bland may refer to:

- George Bland (priest) (1806–1880), English clergyman, archdeacon of Lindisfarne, and of Northumberland
- George Bland (actor) (c. 1758–1807), Irish-stage actor and singer
- George C. Bland (1848–1938), member of the Virginia House of Delegates
- Nevile Bland (George Nevile Maltby Bland, 1886–1972), British diplomat

== See also ==
- George Bland Humble (1839–1930), British and Australian headmaster
