= Franklin Buchanan =

Confederate Navy admiral

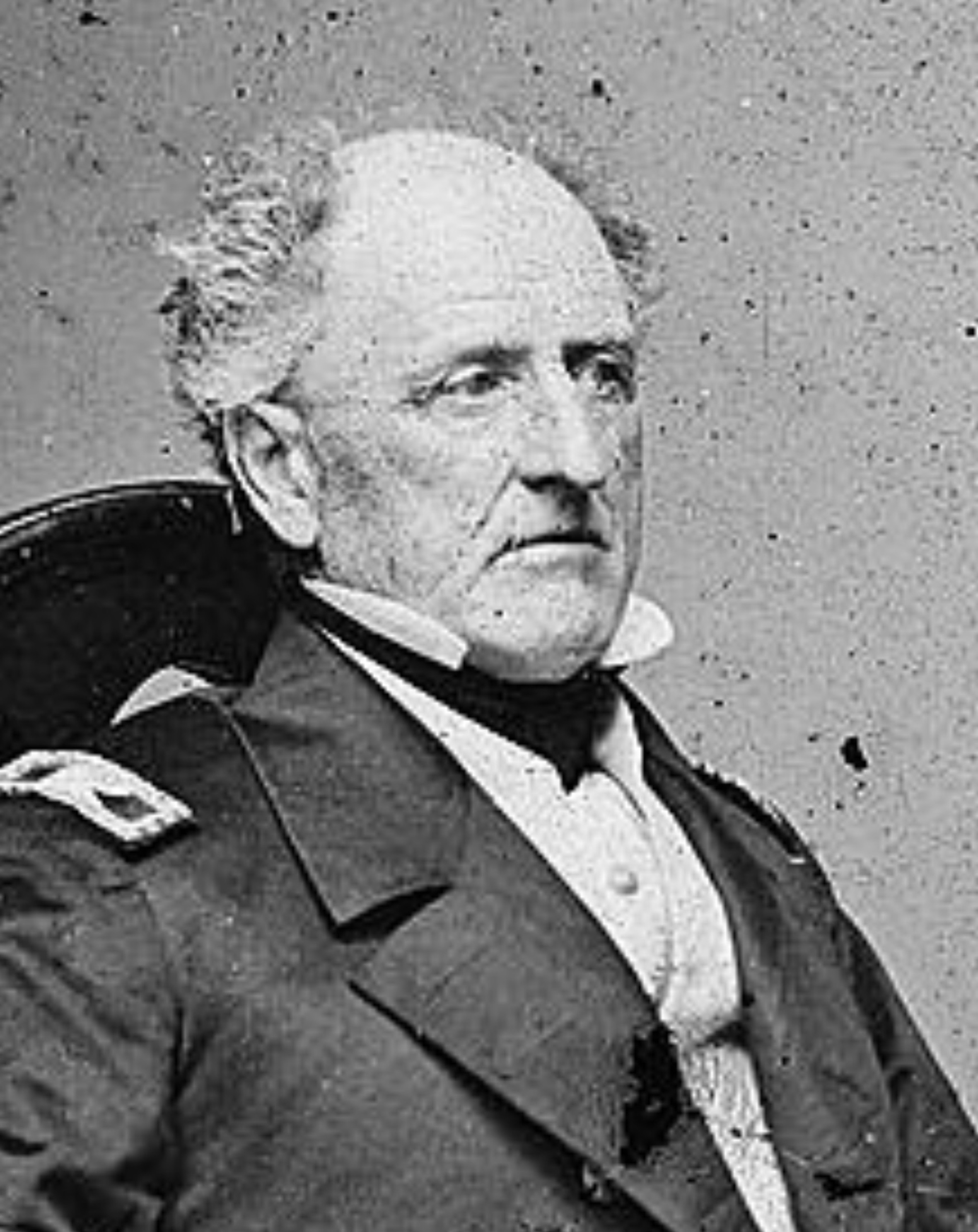
- Franklin Buchanan, c. 1855–1861
- Born: 17 September 1800; Baltimore, Maryland, U.S.
- Died: 11 May 1874 (aged 73); Talbot County, Maryland, U.S.
- Burial place: Wye House family plot outside Easton, Maryland
- Spouse: Ann Catherine Lloyd (m. 1835)
- Children: 9
- Relatives: Thomas McKean (grandfather)
- Military career
- Allegiance: United States; Confederate States
- Branch: United States Navy; Confederate States Navy
- Service years: 1815–1861 (USN); 1861–1865 (CSN)
- Rank: Captain (USN); Admiral (CSN)
- Commands: USS Vincennes; USS Germantown; USS Susquehanna; James River Squadron; CSS Virginia
- Conflicts: Mexican–American War; American Civil War; Battle of Hampton Roads (WIA); Battle of Mobile Bay (POW)
- Other work: College president and businessman

Franklin Buchanan (September 17, 1800 – May 11, 1874) was an officer in the United States Navy who became the only full admiral in the Confederate Navy during the American Civil War. He also commanded the ironclad CSS Virginia.

== Early life ==
Franklin Buchanan was born in Baltimore, Maryland, on September 13, 1800. He was the fifth child and third son of Laetitia (née McKean) and George Buchanan, a physician. The Buchanan side of his family arrived in the United States from Scotland. His paternal grandfather was a general with the Maryland Militia during the Revolutionary War while his maternal grandfather Thomas McKean was one of the signers of the Declaration of Independence.

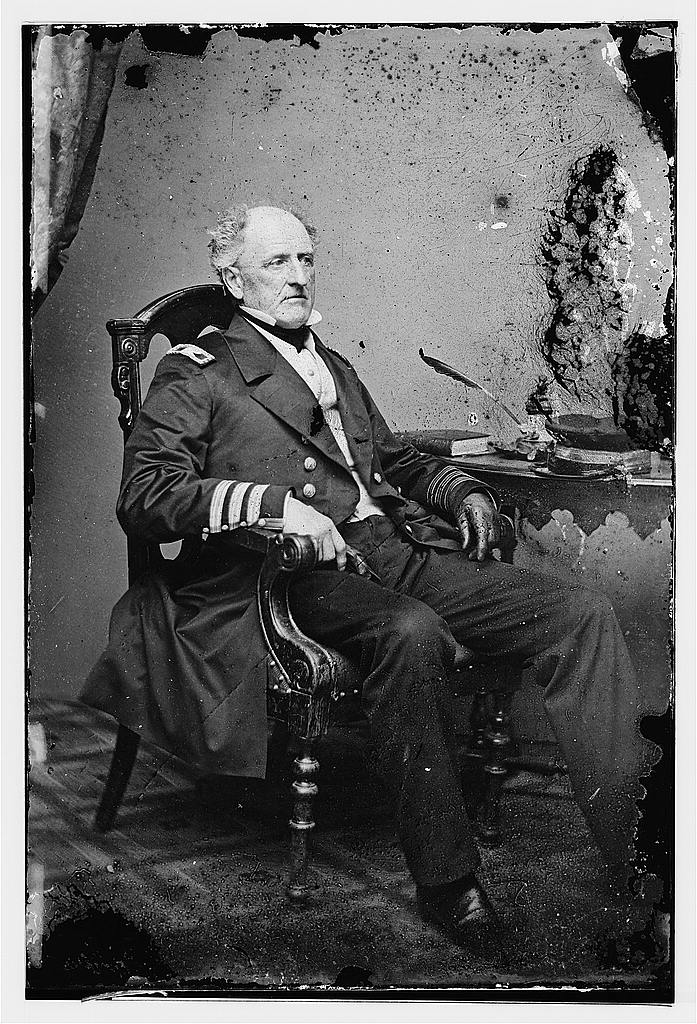
Captain Franklin Buchanan, USN (circa 1855–1861)

He joined the U.S. Navy on January 28, 1815, and became a midshipman; he was promoted to lieutenant on January 13, 1825, commander on September 8, 1841, and then captain on September 14, 1855.

On February 19, 1835, at Annapolis, Maryland, he married Ann Catherine Lloyd. They had nine children: eight daughters and a son.

== U.S. Navy ==
During the 45 years he served in the U.S. Navy, Buchanan had extensive and worldwide sea duty. He commanded the sloops of war Vincennes and Germantown during the 1840s and the steam frigate Susquehanna in the Perry Expedition to Japan from 1852 to 1854. In 1845, at the request of the U.S. Secretary of the Navy, he submitted plans to his superiors proposing a naval school which would lead to the creation of the United States Naval Academy that very year; for his efforts, he was appointed the first superintendent of the Naval School—its first name—where he served in 1845–1847. This assignment was followed by notable Mexican–American War service in 1847–1848. From 1859 to 1861, Buchanan was the commandant of the Washington Navy Yard.

With the Civil War upon him, he resigned his commission on April 22, 1861, expecting his home state of Maryland to eventually secede. When that did not happen, he tried to recall his resignation, but U.S. Secretary of the Navy, Gideon Welles said he did not want traitors or half-hearted patriots in his navy and refused to reinstate him. Thus in May 1861 he was out of the U.S. Navy.

== Civil War ==
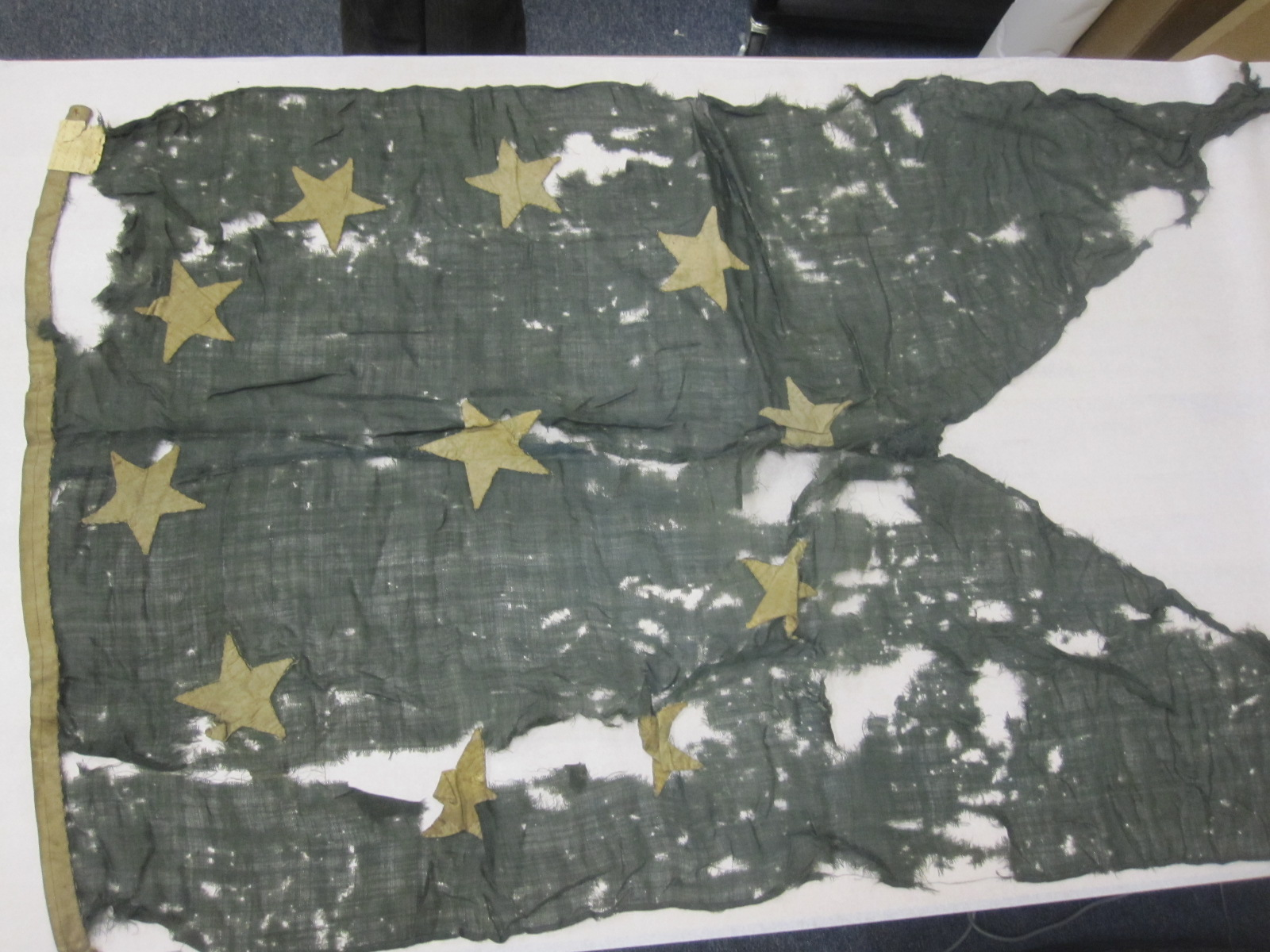
Pennant of Admiral Buchanan used at Mobile Bay (variation of naval jack)

On September 5, 1861, Buchanan joined the Confederate Navy and was given a captain's commission. On February 24, 1862, the Confederate States Secretary of the Navy, Stephen Mallory, appointed Buchanan to the office of Confederate Navy James River Squadron Flag Officer and he then selected the newly built ironclad CSS Virginia to be his flagship.

Buchanan was the captain of CSS Virginia (formerly USS Merrimack) during the Battle of Hampton Roads in Virginia. He climbed to the top deck of Virginia and began furiously firing toward shore with a carbine as USS Congress was shelled. He soon was brought down by a sharpshooter's minie ball to the thigh. He would eventually recover from his leg wound. He did not get to command Virginia against USS Monitor. That honor went to Catesby ap Roger Jones.

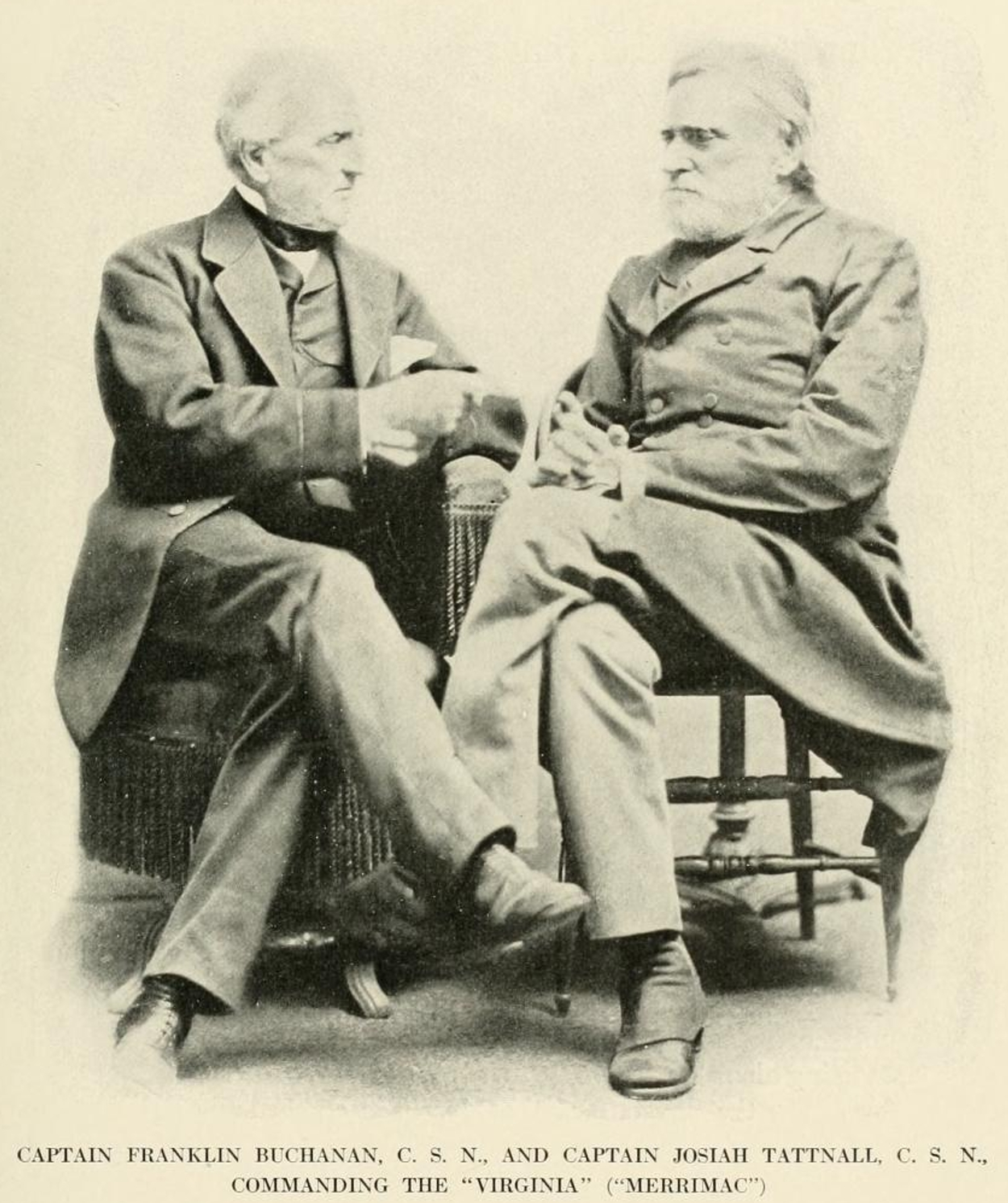
Franklin Buchanan & Josiah Tattnall III, another flag officer, CSN

In August 1862, Buchanan was promoted to the rank of full admiral – the only officer so honored in the Confederate Navy – and was sent to take command of Confederate naval forces stationed at Mobile Bay, Alabama. He oversaw the construction of the ironclad CSS Tennessee, of which the keel was laid in October 1862. He was on board Tennessee during the Battle of Mobile Bay with Rear Admiral David Glasgow Farragut's Union fleet on August 5, 1864. Wounded and taken prisoner, Buchanan was not exchanged until February 1865.

== Later life ==
Following the conflict, Buchanan lived in Maryland and in Mobile, Alabama, until 1870, when he again took up residence in Maryland. He died there on May 11, 1874. He is buried at the Wye House family plot outside Easton, Maryland.

== Legacy ==
Three U.S. Navy destroyers have been named Buchanan in honor of Buchanan: DD-131 (Wickes class), DD-484 (Gleaves class), and DDG-14 (Charles F. Adams class). The superintendent's quarters at the United States Naval Academy is named the Buchanan House, and a street on the Academy grounds is named Buchanan Road. However, in 2023, a naming commission created by federal law to reexamine Confederate-related names and symbols on military installations recommended that Buchanan House and Buchanan Road be renamed. On May 1, 2023, it was announced the Superintendent's quarters will be renamed Farragut House to honor Admiral David Glasgow Farragut.

== See also ==
- List of superintendents of the United States Naval Academy

== Bibliography ==
- Quarstein, John V. (2012), The CSS Virginia: Sink before surrender, Charleston: History Press, ISBN 9781609495800.
- Symonds, Craig L. (1999), Confederate Admiral: The Life and Wars of Franklin Buchanan, Naval Institute Press, ISBN 978-1-59114-846-3.
- Lewis, Charles L. (1929), Admiral Franklin Buchanan: Fearless Man of Action, Baltimore: The Norman Remington Company Online

Military offices
| Preceded by None | Superintendent of United States Naval Academy; 1845–1847 | Succeeded by George P. Upshur |
| Preceded by French Forrest | Commander of the James River Squadron; February 27, 1862 – March 29, 1862 | Succeeded by Josiah Tattnall III |
Academic offices
| Preceded by Charles Minor | President of the Maryland Agricultural College; 1868–1869 | Succeeded by Samuel Register |
