= Confederate States Navy =

- Seal of the Department of the Navy
- Founded: February 21, 1861
- Disbanded: November 6, 1865
- Country: Confederate States
- Type: Navy
- Part of: Confederate Forces
- Engagements: American Civil War

Commanders
- Commander in Chief: Jefferson Davis
- Secretary of the Navy: Stephen R. Mallory

Insignia
- Naval ensign 1864–1865

- 1861–1863

- Naval jack 1864–1865

- 1861–1863

The Confederate States Navy (CSN) was the naval branch of the Confederate States Armed Forces, established by an act of the Confederate States Congress on February 21, 1861. It was responsible for Confederate naval operations during the American Civil War against the United States' Union Navy.

The three major tasks of the Confederate States Navy during its existence were the protection of Confederate harbors and coastlines from outside invasion, making the war costly for the United States by attacking its merchant ships worldwide, and running the U.S. blockade by drawing off Union ships in pursuit of Confederate commerce raiders and warships.

It was ineffective in these tasks, as the coastal blockade by the United States Navy reduced trade by the South to 5 percent of its pre-war levels. Additionally, the control of inland rivers and coastal navigation by the US Navy forced the south to overload its limited railroads to the point of failure.

The surrender of the CSS Shenandoah in Liverpool, England, marked the end of the Civil War and the Confederate Navy's existence.

== History ==
The Confederate Navy could never achieve numerical equality with the Union Navy. It instead sought to take advantage of technological innovation, such as ironclads, submarines, torpedo boats, and naval mines (then known as torpedoes). In February 1861, the Confederate States Navy had 30 vessels, only 14 of which were seaworthy. The opposing Union Navy had 90 vessels. The C. S. Navy eventually grew to 101 ships to meet the rise in naval conflicts and threats to the coast and rivers of the Confederacy.

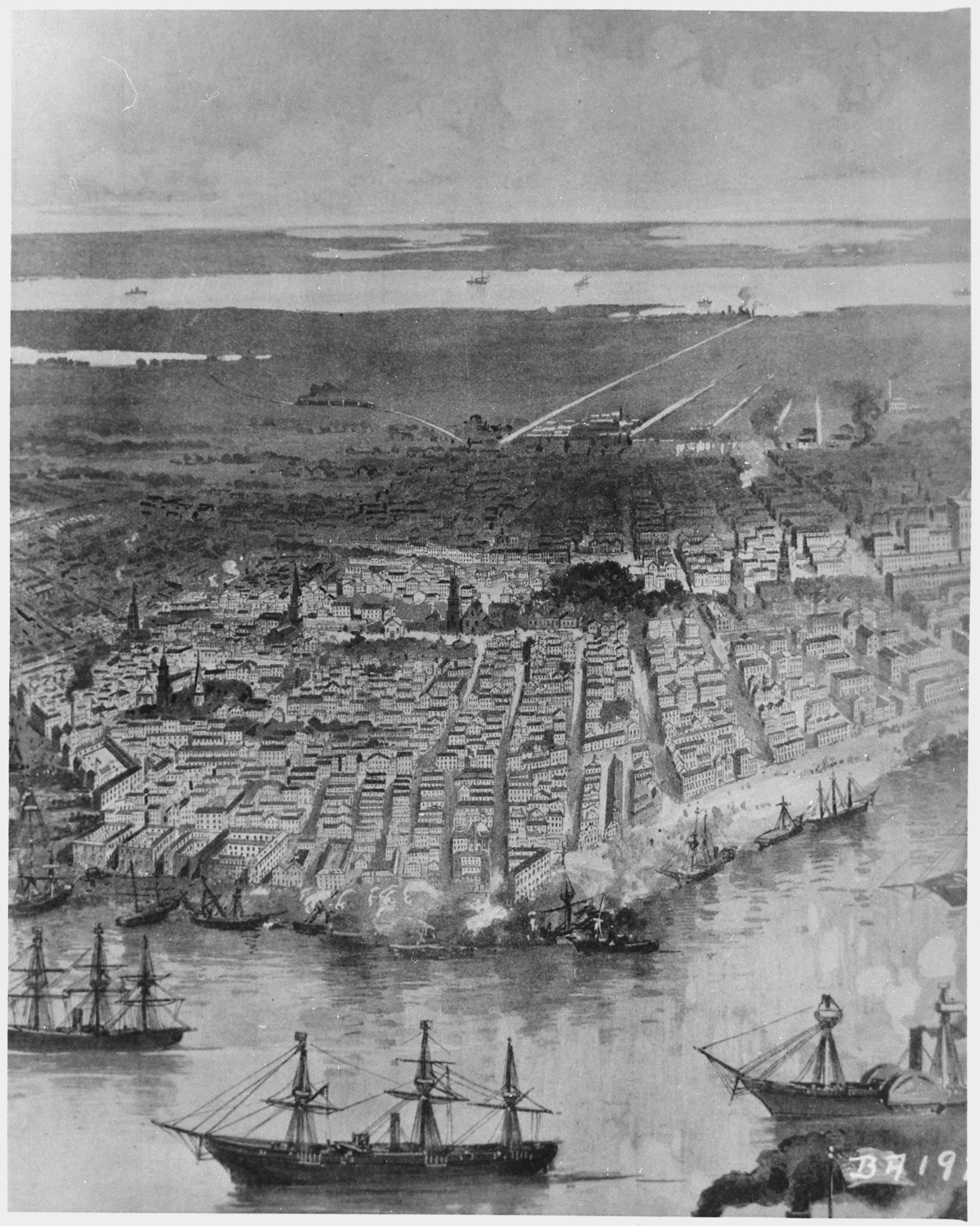
Illustration of the Confederate fleet at New Orleans

On April 20, 1861, the U.S. was forced to quickly abandon the important Gosport Navy Yard at Portsmouth, Virginia. In their haste, they failed to effectively burn the facility with its large depots of arms, other supplies, and several small vessels. As a result, the Confederacy captured a large supply of much-needed war materials, including heavy cannon, gunpowder, shot, and shell. Of most importance to the Confederacy was the shipyard's dry docks, barely damaged by the departing Union forces. The Confederacy's only substantial navy yard at that time was in Pensacola, Florida, so the Gosport Yard was sorely needed to build new warships. The most significant warship left at the Yard was the screw frigate USS Merrimack.

The U.S. Navy had torched Merrimack's superstructure and upper deck, then scuttled the vessel; it would have been immediately useful as a warship to their enemy. Little of the ship's structure remained other than the hull, which was holed by the scuttling charge but otherwise intact. Confederate Navy Secretary Stephen Mallory had the idea to raise Merrimack and rebuild it. When the hull was raised, it had not been submerged long enough to have been rendered unusable; the steam engines and essential machinery were salvageable. The decks were rebuilt using thick oak and pine planking, and the upper deck was overlaid with two courses of heavy iron plate. The newly rebuilt superstructure was unusual: above the waterline, the sides sloped inward and were covered with two layers of heavy iron-plate armor, the inside course laid horizontally, the outside course laid vertically. As secretary, Stephen Mallory knew the South lacked the industry to build modern seagoing ironclads and sought to buy them abroad to break the Union blockade and potentially retake New Orleans; in May 1861, Congress even appropriated $2 million for overseas ironclad purchases from Europe.

The vessel was a new kind of warship, an all-steam powered "iron-clad". In the centuries-old tradition of reusing captured ships, the new warship was christened CSS Virginia. She later fought the Union's new ironclad USS Monitor. On the second day of the Battle of Hampton Roads, the two ships met and each scored numerous hits on the other. On the first day of that battle Virginia, and the James River Squadron, aggressively attacked and nearly broke the Union Navy's sea blockade of wooden warships, proving the effectiveness of the ironclad concept. The two ironclads had steamed forward, tried to outflank or ram the other, circled, backed away, and came forward firing again and again, but neither was able to sink or demand surrender of its opponent. After four hours, both ships were taking on water through split seams and breaches from enemy shot. The engines of both ships were becoming dangerously overtaxed, and their crews were near exhaustion. The two ships turned and steamed away, never to meet again. This part in the Battle of Hampton Roads between Monitor and Virginia greatly overshadowed the bloody events each side's ground troops were fighting, largely because it was the first battle in history between two iron-armored steam-powered warships.

The last Confederate surrender took place in Liverpool, United Kingdom on November 6, 1865, aboard the commerce raider CSS Shenandoah when her flag (battle ensign) was lowered for the final time. This surrender brought about the end of the Confederate navy. The Shenandoah had circumnavigated the globe, the only Confederate ship to do so.

=== Creation ===
The act of the Confederate Congress that created the Confederate Navy on February 21, 1861, also appointed Stephen Mallory as Secretary of the Department of the Navy. Mallory was experienced as an admiralty lawyer and had served for a time as the chairman of the Naval Affairs Committee of the United States Senate. The Confederacy had a few scattered naval assets and looked to Liverpool, England, to buy naval cruisers to attack the American merchant fleet. In April 1861, Mallory recruited former U.S. Navy Lieutenant James Dunwoody Bulloch into the Confederate navy and sent him to Liverpool. Using Charleston-based importer and exporter Fraser Trentholm, who had offices in Liverpool, Commander Bulloch immediately ordered six steam vessels.

As Mallory began aggressively building up a formidable naval force, a Confederate Congress committee on August 27, 1862, reported:

Before the war, nineteen steam war vessels had been built in the States forming the Confederacy, and the engines for all of these had been contracted for in those States. All the labor or materials requisite to complete and equip a war vessel could not be commanded at any one point of the Confederacy. [The Navy Department] had erected a powder-mill which supplies all the powder required by our navy; two engine, boiler and machine shops, and five ordnance workshops. It has established eighteen yards for building war vessels, and a rope-walk, making all cordage from a rope-yarn to a 9-inch cable, and capable of turning out 8,000 yards per month .... Of vessels not ironclad and converted to war vessels, there were 44. The department has built and completed as war vessels, 12; partially constructed and destroyed to save from the enemy, 10; now under construction, 9; ironclad vessels now in commission, 12; completed and destroyed or lost by capture, 4; in progress of construction and in various stages of forwardness, 23.

In addition to the ships included in the report of the committee, the C.S. Navy also had one ironclad floating battery, presented to the Confederacy by the state of Georgia, one ironclad ram donated by the state of Alabama, and numerous commerce raiders making war on Union merchant ships. When Virginia seceded the Virginia Navy was absorbed into the Confederate Navy.

=== Naval flags ===
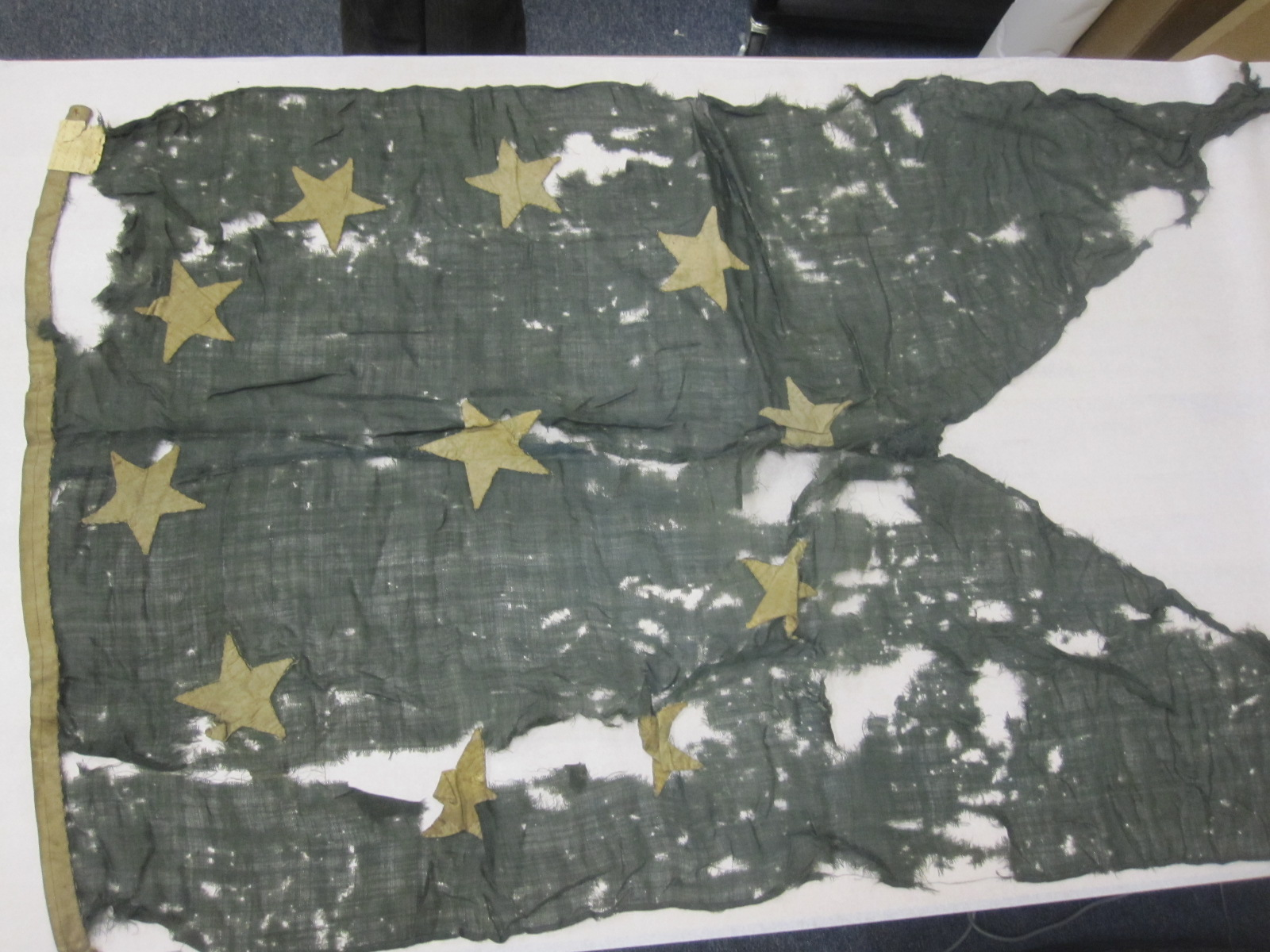
Pennant of Admiral Franklin Buchanan used at Battle of Mobile Bay, Alabama, 1864

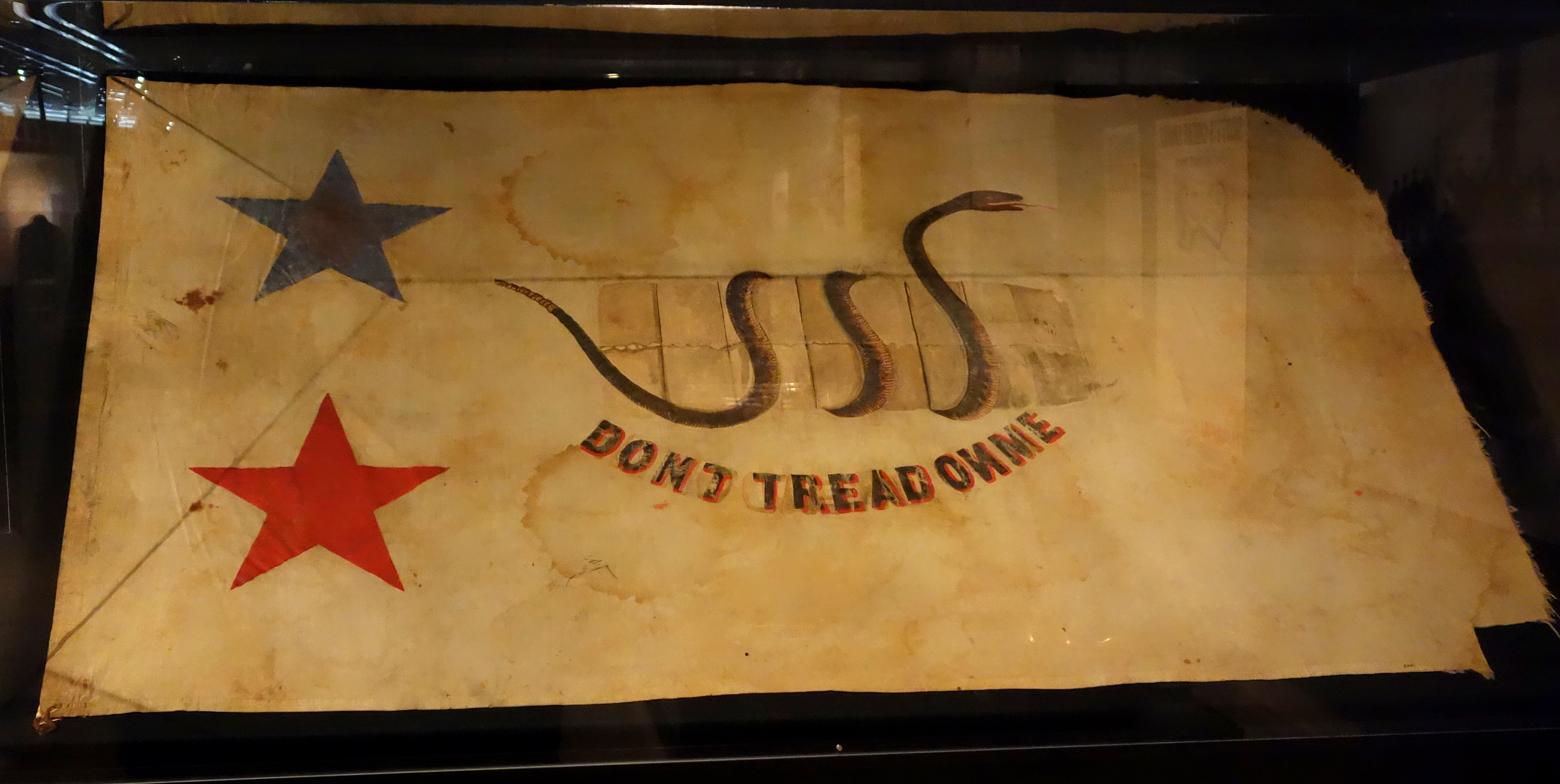
Confederate naval flag, captured when General William Sherman took Savannah, Georgia, 1864

The practice of using primary and secondary naval flags after the British tradition was common practice for the Confederacy; the fledgling Confederate navy therefore adopted detailed flag requirements and regulations in the use of battle ensigns, naval jacks, as well as small boat ensigns, commissioning pennants, designating flags, and signal flags aboard its warships. Changes to these regulations were made during 1863, when a new naval jack, battle ensign, and commissioning pennant design was introduced aboard all Confederate ships, echoing the Confederacy's change of its national flag from the old "Stars and Bars" to the new "Stainless Banner". Despite the detailed naval regulations issued, minor variations in the flags were frequently seen, due to different manufacturing techniques employed, suppliers used, and the flag-making traditions of each southern state.

=== Privateers ===
On April 17, 1861, Confederate President Jefferson Davis invited applications for letters of marque and reprisal to be granted under the seal of the Confederate States, against ships and property of the United States and their citizens:

Now, therefore, I, Jefferson Davis, President of the Confederate States of America, do issue this, my proclamation, inviting all those who may desire, by service in private armed vessels on the high seas, to aid this government in resisting so wanton and wicked an aggression, to make application for commissions or letters of marque and reprisal, to be issued under the seal of these Confederate States...

President Davis was not confident of his executive authority to issue letters of marque and called a special session of Congress on April 29 to formally authorize the hiring of privateers in the name of the Confederate States. On 6 May the Confederate Congress passed "An act recognizing the existence of war between the United States and the Confederate States, and concerning letters of marque, prizes, and prize goods." Then, on May 14, 1861, "An act regulating the sale of prizes and the distribution thereof," was also passed. Both acts granted the president power to issue letters of marque and detailed regulations as to the conditions on which letters of marque should be granted to private vessels, the conduct and behavior of the officers and crews of such vessels, and the disposal of such prizes made by privateer crews. The manner in which Confederate privateers operated was generally similar to those of privateers of the United States or of European nations.

The 1856 Declaration of Paris outlawed privateering for such nations as the United Kingdom and France, but the United States had neither signed nor endorsed the declaration. Therefore, privateering was constitutionally legal in both the United States and the Confederacy, as well as Portugal, Russia, the Ottoman Empire, and Germany. However, the United States did not acknowledge the Confederacy as an independent country and denied the legitimacy of any letters of marque issued by its government. U.S. President Abraham Lincoln declared all medicines to the Confederacy to be contraband and any captured Confederate privateers were to be hanged as pirates. Ultimately, no one was hanged for privateering because the Confederate government threatened to retaliate against U.S. prisoners of war.

Initially, Confederate privateers operated primarily from New Orleans, but activity was soon concentrated in the Atlantic, as the Union Navy began expanding its operations. Confederate privateers harassed Union merchant ships and sank several warships, although they were unable to relieve the blockade on Southern ports and its dire effects on the Confederate economy.

== Ships ==
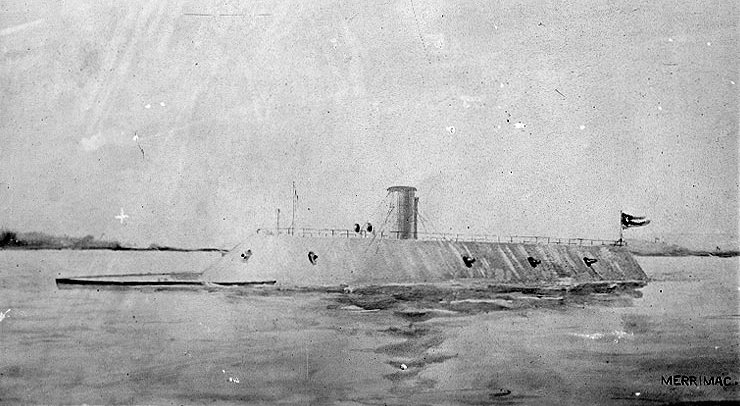
CSS Virginia, an ironclad warship

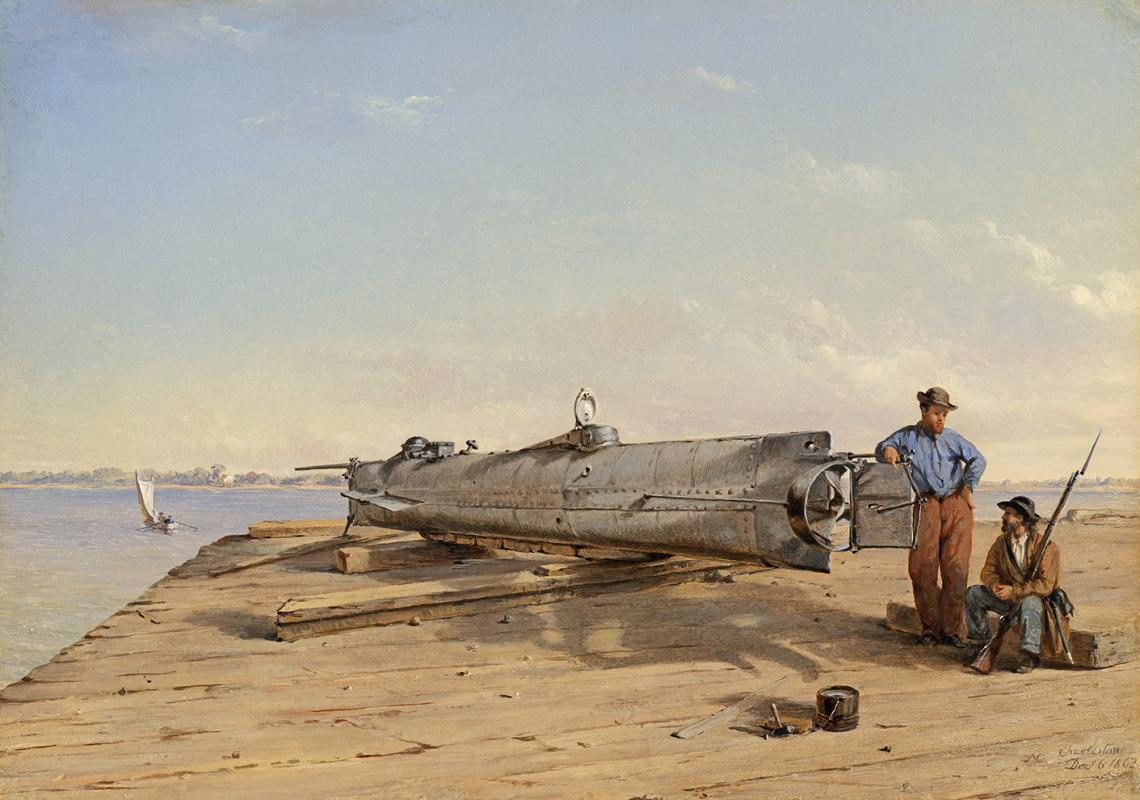
Drawing of submarine H. L. Hunley

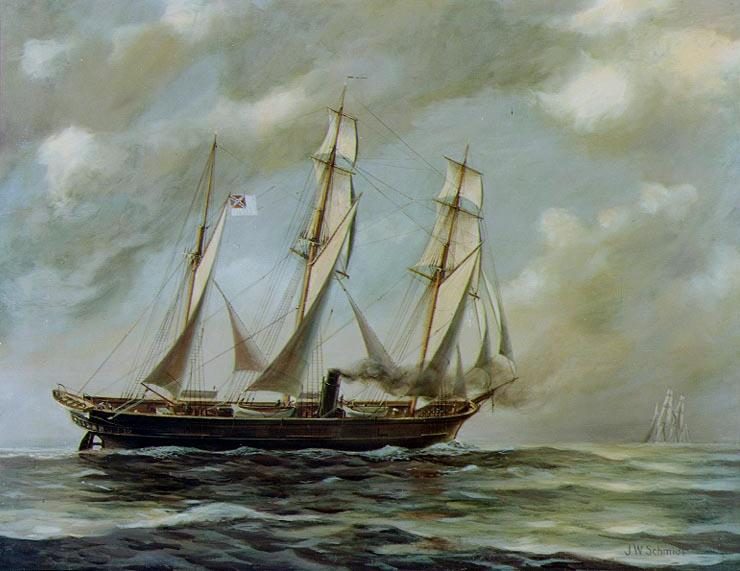
A 1961 painting of CSS Alabama

In May 1861, Confederate Congress appropriated $2,000,000 to either construct or purchase ironclad vessels in England. The Confederacy intended to use the European ironclads to break the Union blockade. Aside from those built in Europe, the Confederacy also manufactured their own vessels. Despite a lack of materials (especially iron and engines) and shipbuilding facilities, the Confederacy was able to construct at least twenty ironclads that were commissioned and put into operation during the war.

One of the more well-known ships was the CSS Virginia, formerly the sloop-of-war USS Merrimack (1855). In 1862, after being converted to an ironclad ram, she fought USS Monitor in the Battle of Hampton Roads, an event that came to symbolize the end of the dominance of large wooden sailing warships and the beginning of the age of steam and the ironclad warship.

The Confederates also constructed submarines, among the few that existed after the early Turtle of the American Revolutionary War. Of those the Pioneer and the Bayou St. John submarine never saw action. However, Hunley, built in Mobile as a privateer by Horace Hunley, later came under the control of the Confederate Army at Charleston, SC, but was manned partly by a C. S. Navy crew; she became the first submarine to sink a ship in a wartime engagement.

The Hunley later sank the sloop-of-war USS Housatonic, resulting from the large blastwave that traveled from its exploding spar torpedo's 500-pound black powder charge, during the sinking of USS Housatonic. The sinking of the Housatonic became the first successful submarine attack in history.

Confederate Navy commerce raiders were also used with great success to disrupt U.S. merchant shipping. The most famous of them was the screw sloop-of-war CSS Alabama, a warship secretly built for the Confederacy in Birkenhead, near Liverpool, United Kingdom. She was launched as Enrica but was commissioned as CSS Alabama just off the Azores by her captain, Raphael Semmes. She began her world-famous raiding career under his command, accounting for 65 U.S. ships, a record that still remains unbeaten by any ship in naval warfare. CSS Alabama's crew was mostly from Liverpool, and the cruiser never once dropped anchor in a Confederate port, though she sank a blockading Union gunboat off the coast of Texas. She was sunk in June 1864 by USS Kearsarge at the Battle of Cherbourg outside the port of Cherbourg, France.

A similar raider, CSS Shenandoah, fired the last shot of the American Civil War in late June 1865; she did not strike her colors and surrender until early November 1865, in Liverpool, England five months after the conflict had ended.

== Organization ==
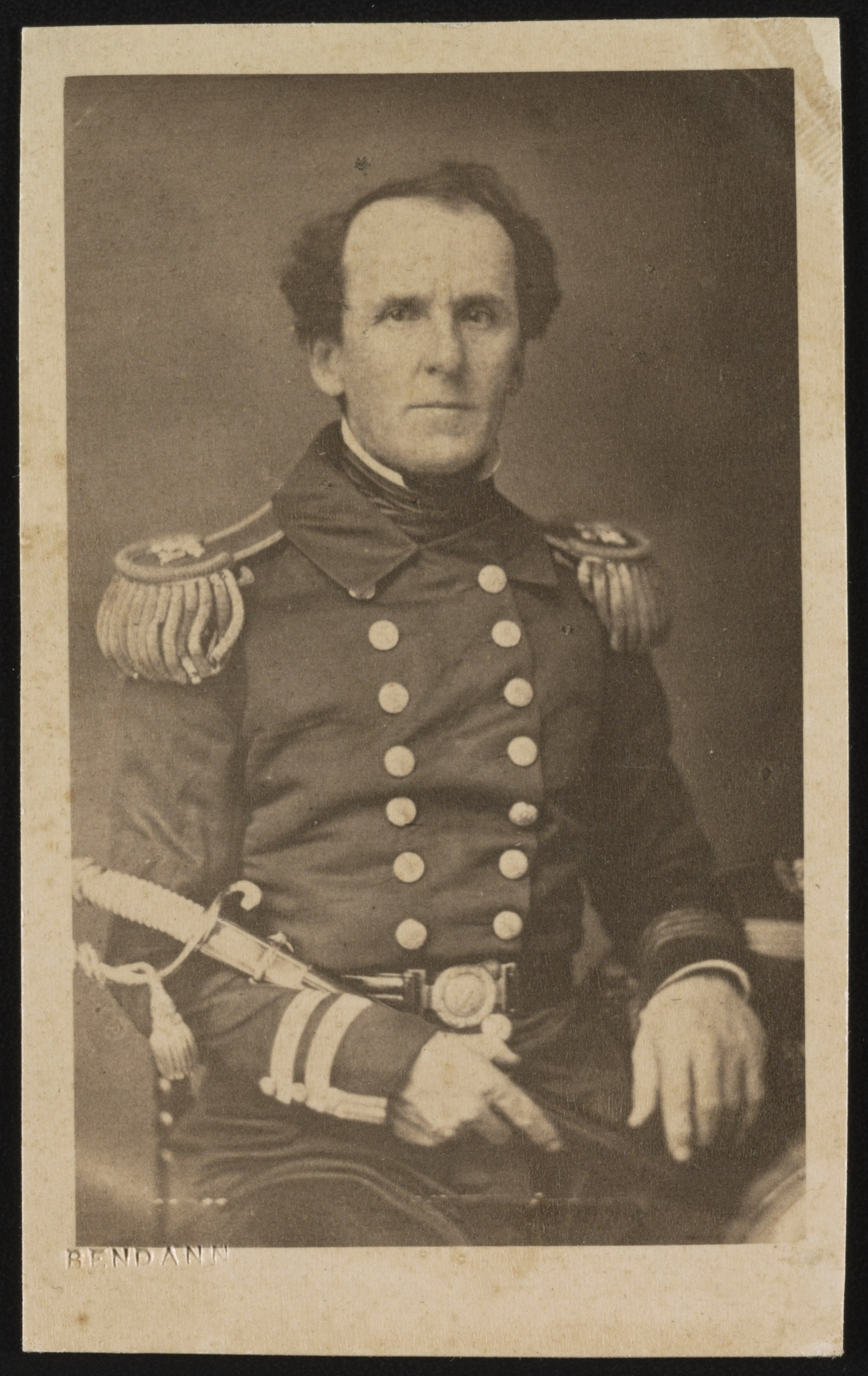
Commander William F. Lynch of Confederate States Navy

Between the beginning of the war and the end of 1861, 373 commissioned officers, warrant officers, and midshipmen had resigned or been dismissed from the United States Navy and had gone on to serve the Confederacy. The Provisional Congress meeting in Montgomery accepted these men into the Confederate Navy at their old rank. In order to accommodate them they initially provided for an officer corps to consist of four captains, four commanders, 30 lieutenants, and various other non-line officers. On 21 April 1862, the First Congress expanded this to four admirals, ten captains, 31 commanders, 100 first lieutenants, 25 second lieutenants, and 20 masters in line of promotion; additionally, there were to be 12 paymasters, 40 assistant paymasters, 22 surgeons, 15 passed assistant surgeons, 30 assistant surgeons, one engineer-in-chief, and 12 engineers. The act also provided for promotion on merit: "All the Admirals, four of the Captains, five of the Commanders, twenty-two of the First Lieutenants, and five of the Second Lieutenants, shall be appointed solely for gallant or meritorious conduct during the war."

=== Administration ===
The Department of the Navy was responsible for the administration of the affairs of the Confederate Navy and Confederate Marine Corps. It included various offices, bureaus, and naval agents in Europe.

By July 20, 1861, the Confederate government had organized the administrative positions of the Confederate navy as follows:

- Stephen R. Mallory – Secretary of the Navy
- Commodore Samuel Barron – Chief of the Bureau of Orders and Detail
- Commander George Minor – Chief of Ordnance and Hydrography
- Paymaster John DeBree – Chief of Provisions and Clothing
- Surgeon W. A. W. Spottswood – Bureau of Medicine and Surgery
- Edward M. Tidball – Chief Clerk

== Notable engagements ==
- Battle of Cherbourg
- Battle of Forts Jackson and St. Philip
- First Battle of Memphis
- Battle of Mobile Bay
- Battle of Hampton Roads
- Bahia incident
- Battle of the Head of Passes
- Siege of Fort Pulaski
- Battle of Plum Point Bend
- Action off Galveston Light
- Battle of Elizabeth City

== Ranks ==
By 1862 regulations specified the uniforms and rank insignia for officers. Petty officers wore a variety of uniforms, or even regular clothing.

=== Officers ===
Officers of the Confederate States Navy used, just like the army, a combination of several rank insignias to indicate their rank. While both hat insignia and sleeve insignia were used here the primary indicator were shoulder straps. Only line officers wore those straps shown below as officers of various staff departments (Medical, Pay, Engineering and Naval Construction) had separate ranks and different straps. Likewise the anchor symbol on the hats was substituted accordingly and they did not wear loops on the sleeve insignias.

Paymasters, surgeons and chief engineers of more than twelve year's standing ranked with commanders. Paymasters, surgeons and chief engineers of less than twelve year's standing ranked with lieutenants. Assistant paymasters ranked with masters during the first five years of service, then with lieutenants. Passed assistant surgeons and professors ranked with masters. Assistant surgeons, first assistant engineers and secretaries to commanders of squadrons ranked with passed midshipmen. Second and third assistant engineers and clerks to commanding officers and paymasters ranked as midshipmen.

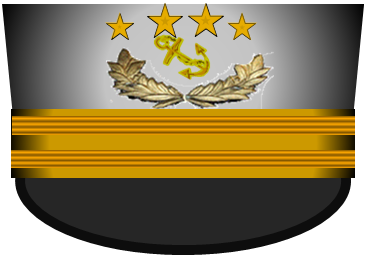
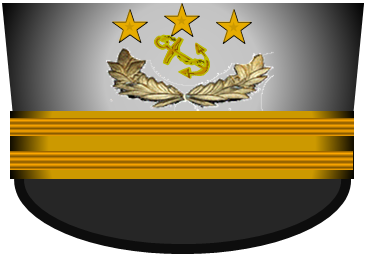
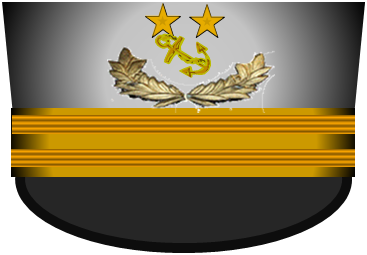
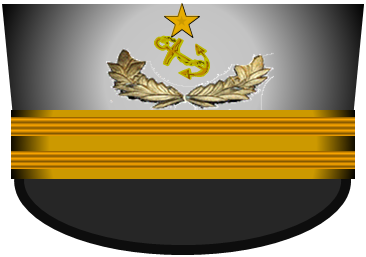
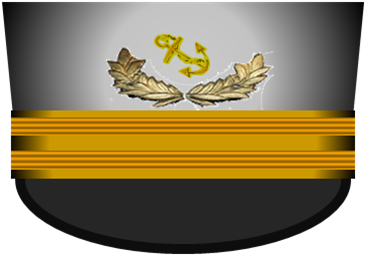
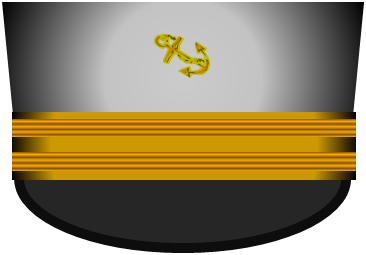
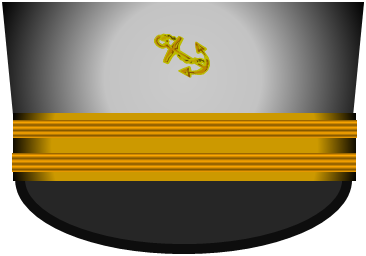
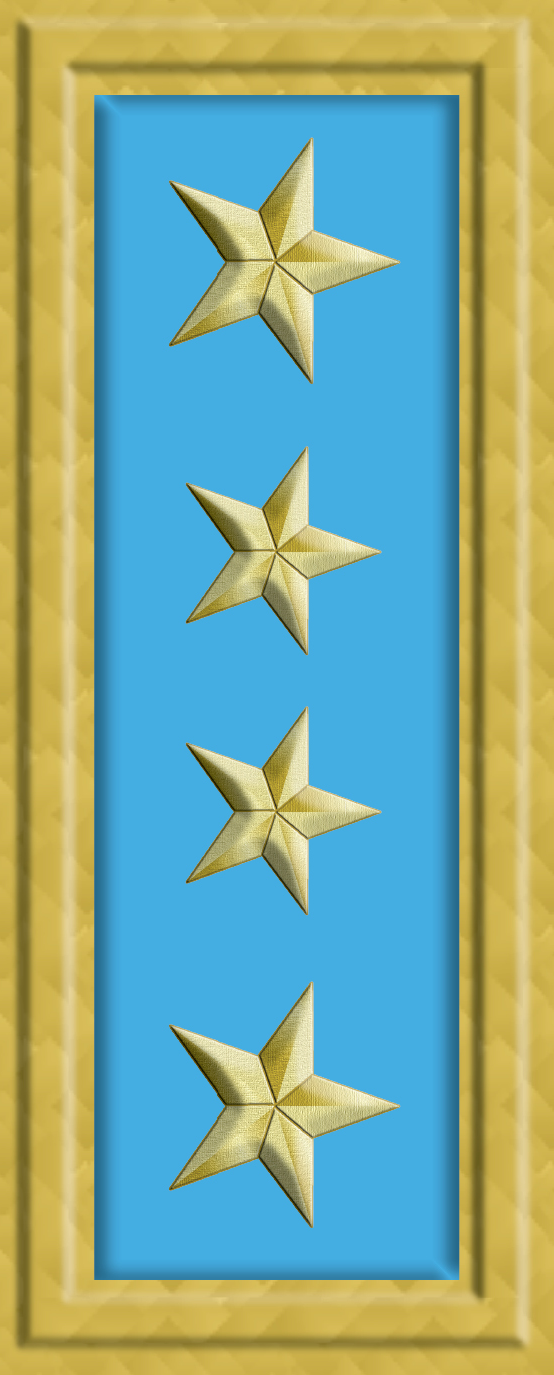
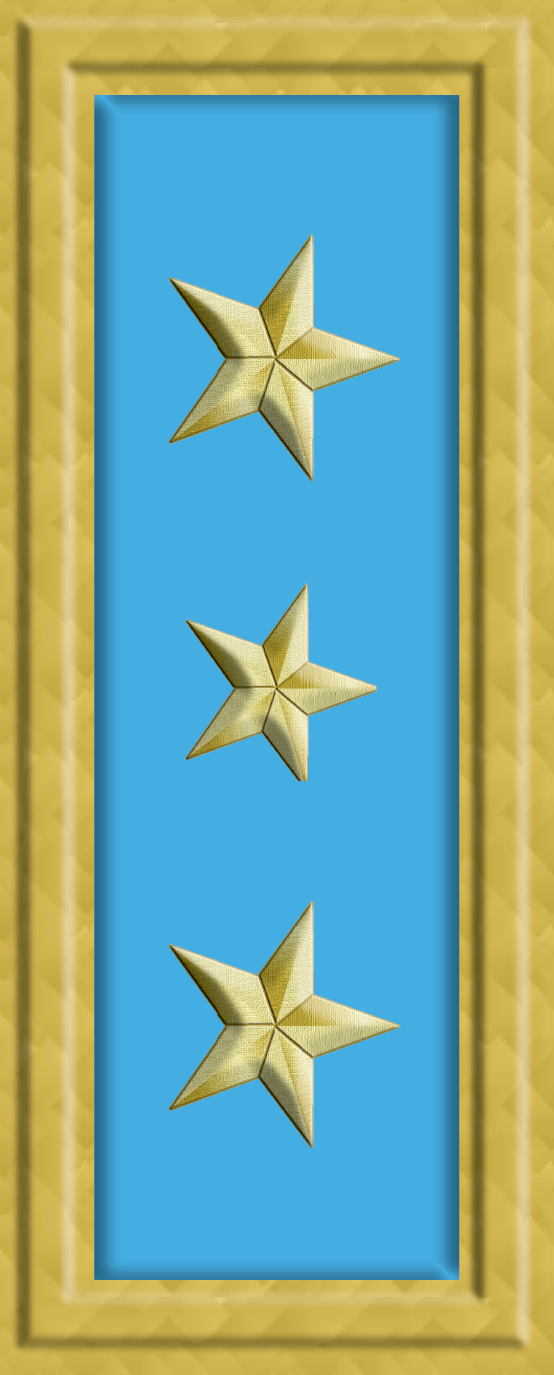
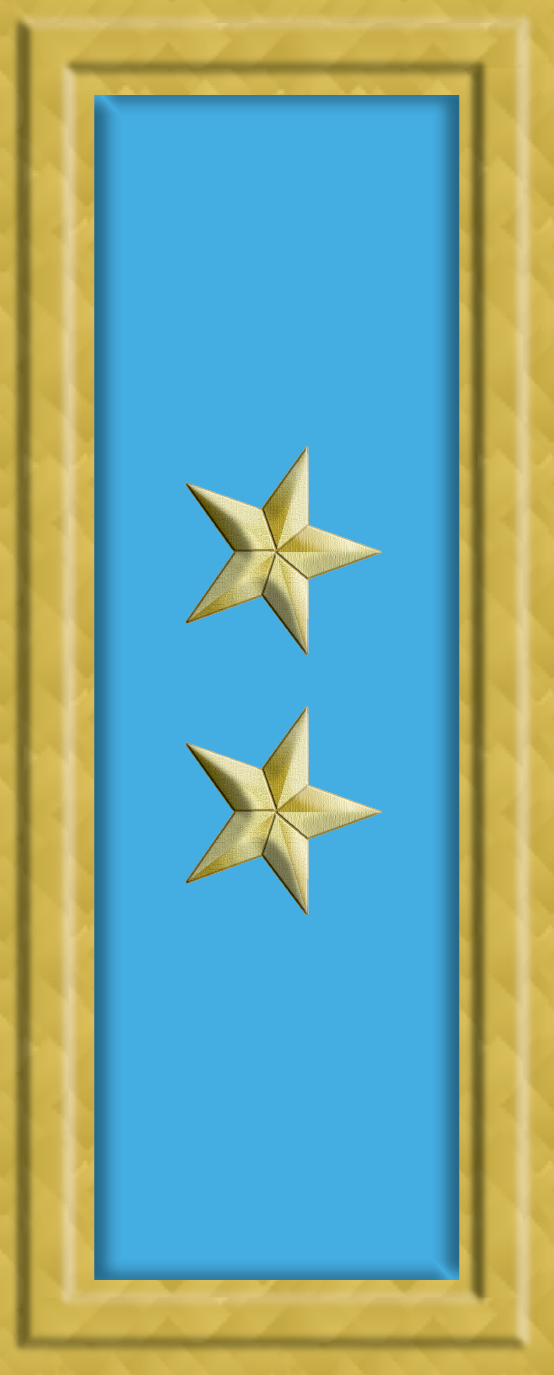
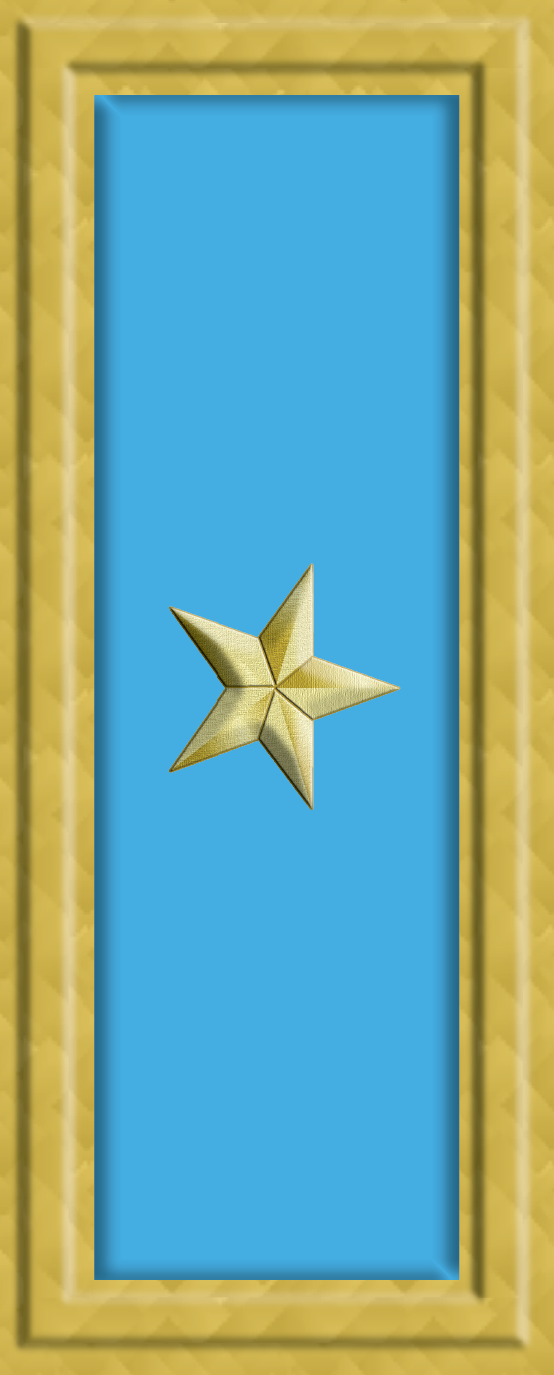
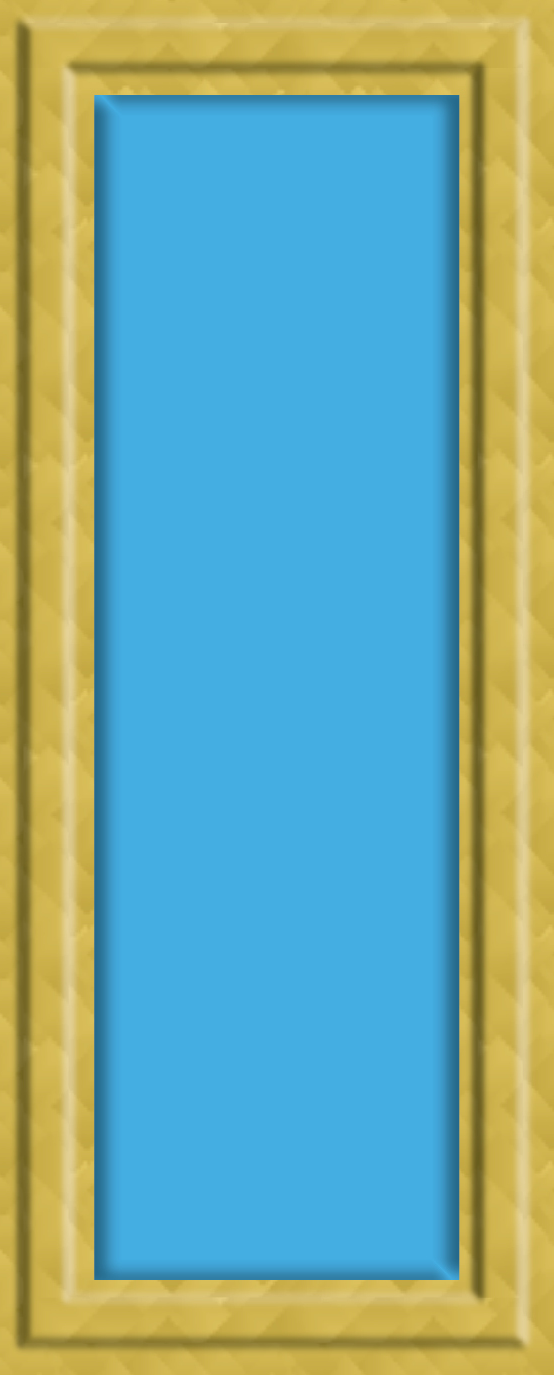
Rank group	General / flag officers	Senior officers		Junior officers
Hat
Shoulder							No insignia
Sleeve
	Flag officer	Captain	Commander	Lieutenant	Master	Passed midshipman	Midshipman

=== Warrant and Petty Officers ===
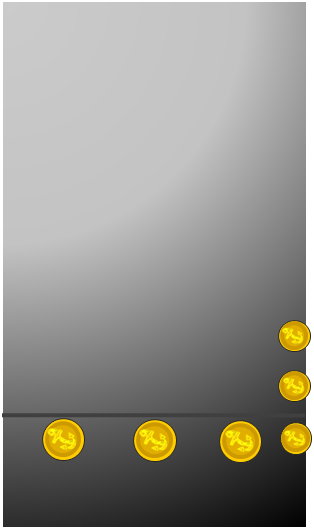
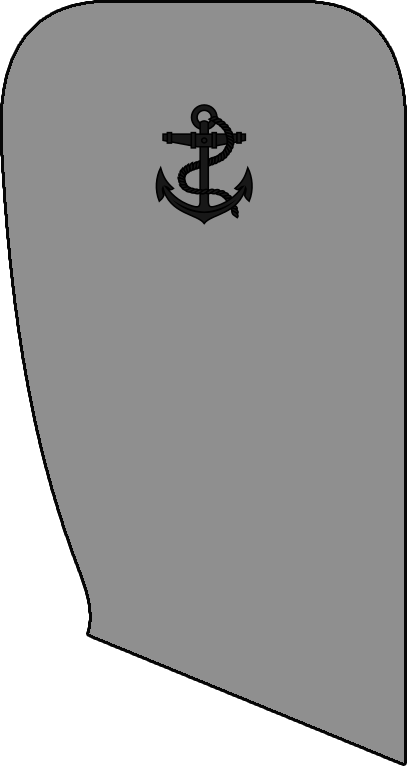
	Boatswain Gunner Carpenter Sailmaker	Petty Officer (Boatswain's Mate and equivalent)	Petty Officer (Quartermasters and equivalent)	Seaman
Sleeve

=== Pay ===
Annual pay for commissioned and warrant officers

Rank	On duty at sea	On other duty	On leave or waiting orders
Admiral	$6,000	n/a	n/a
Captain commanding squadron	$5,000	n/a	n/a
Captain	$4,200	$3,600	$3,200
Commander	$2,825/3,150 (Note: According to length of commissioned sea duty.)	$2,662/2,825 (Note: According to length of commissioned service.)	$2,250
Lieutenants commanding	$2,250	n/a	n/a
First Lieutenant	$1,500/1,700/1,900/2,100/2,250	$1,500/1,600/1,700/1,800/1,875	$1,200/1,266/1,333/1,400/1,450
Second Lieutenant	$1,200	$1,000	
Master; In line of promotion	$1,000	$900	
Master; Not in line of promotion	$1,000	$900	
Passed Midshipman	$900	$800	
Midshipman	$550	$500	$450
Boatswain; Gunner; Carpenter; Sailmaker	$1,500/1,700/1,900/2,100/2,250 (Note: According to length of warrant sea service.)	$800/900/1,000/1,100/1,200	$600/700/800/900/1,000

Notes

Monthly pay for petty officers, men and boys

Pay	Rate
$49	Yeoman in ship of the line
$44	Yeoman in frigate
$34	Yeoman in sloop, armorer in ship of the line, ship's steward, fireman first class
$29	Armorer in frigates, master's mate (not warranted), boatswain's mate, gunner's mate, carpenter's mate, master-at-arms, fireman second class
$28	Yeomen in smaller vessels, coxswain, quartermaster, captain of forecastle, captain of tops, captain of afterguard, captain of hold, cooper, painter, surgeon's steward, ship's cook
$24	Armorer in sloops, sailmaker's mate, armorer's mate, ship's corporal, quarter gunner, officer's steward, officer's cook, master of the band
$22	Seaman, coal-heaver
$19	Musician first class
$18	Ordinary seaman
$16	Landsman, musician second class
$14	Boy
$13	Boy
$12	Boy

== See also ==
- CSS Sumter - the first Confederate ship to put to sea
- Confederate States Marine Corps
- Confederate States Lighthouse Bureau
- List of ships of the Confederate States Navy
- Blockade runners of the American Civil War
- Confederate army
- Military uniforms of the Confederate States
- Bibliography of American Civil War naval history
- Military history of African Americans in the U.S. Civil War
- Mississippi River in the American Civil War
