= Virginian schooner Liberty =

Revolutionary War schooner of the Virginia Navy

- Liberty depicted in a Revolutionary War-era painting

History

Virginia
- Name: Liberty
- Owner: Virginia Navy
- Acquired: April 1, 1776
- Out of service: 1787
- Fate: Sold 1788 as freight carrier in the West Indies

General characteristics
- Type: Square-sterned schooner
- Tonnage: 60 t
- Length: 56 ft (17 m)
- Complement: 22
- Armament: 10 two-pounder swivel guns

Liberty was a schooner operated by the Virginia Navy during and after the American Revolutionary War, in service with Virginia from 1775 to 1787. She was the sole vessel in the Virginia Navy that was not captured by the British, the sole vessel in the Virginia Navy to serve for the full duration of the war.

== Design and specifications ==
Liberty was a square-sterned schooner built to serve as a pilot boat, guiding boats up the Chesapeake Bay. She was 56 feet (17 m) long and about 60 tons.

== Service history ==
Liberty was owned by James Barron of Hampton, Virginia. His brother, Richard Barron, owned a similar schooner named Patriot. James Barron took an active part in the war even before the establishment of the Virginia Navy. Liberty was "equipped by the public" to defend the Chesapeake Bay from British ships. Liberty and Patriot began stopping and seizing British ships in December 1776. She captured two British ships carrying salt and a slave ship. By January 1776, the Barron brothers had seized seven or eight British ships combined. On December 21, 1775, Barron fitted Liberty with 10 two-pounder swivel guns. Patrick Henry directed that both Liberty and Patriot be outfitted with paid crews.

On April 1, 1776, the Virginia Committee of Safety purchased her. Bannon was made captain, the schooner was also given a lieutenant, and her total crew consisted of 22 men. She was the first boat commissioned for the new Virginia Navy. On April 6, Liberty intercepted dispatches between Lord Dunmore and the governor of Maryland, Sir Robert Eden. The captured correspondence included information about an upcoming campaign in South Carolina, which would result in a British defeat at Sullivan's Island in June.

A Revolutionary War-era depiction of the action between Oxford (left) and Liberty (right). Liberty flies both the Continental Union Flag and the Pine Tree Flag.

On 29 May, the brig Andrew Doria captured two British transport ships off Nova Scotia. After spotting sails off Martha's Vinyard, the captain of Andrew Doria ordered the ships to scatter. The captured HMS Oxford was retaken by its prisoners, highlanders of the 42nd Regiment of Foot. Oxford sailed into Hampton Roads just before nightfall on 21 June. The schooners Liberty and Patriot were sent to investigate. The highlanders took them to be British and sent a boat to inquire for Lord Dunmore. Lieutenant John Trevett of the Continental Marines informed the schooners of Oxford's situation. The schooners seized the transport shortly before midnight. According to Encyclopedia Virginia, Barron raised the unofficial United States flag and fired at the British ship. Liberty's cannonfire was aimed at the mainmast and rigging of Oxford. The British ship was then captured and taken to Jamestown.

Liberty and Patriot were assigned to patrol near the Virginia Capes, serving as escorts to the brigs Raleigh and Liberty. These vessels were assigned to annoy the enemy and defend trading vessels. In early spring 1779, a sixteen-man crew manning Liberty pursued the British tender Fortunatus as it left Hampton Roads for its mothership, HMS Emerald. The schooner reached the tender just 4 to 5 miles (6.4 to 8.0 km) away from Cape Henry. Liberty's swivel guns could fire up to 32 musket balls stored in a bag each time they were fired, while Fortunatus fired six-pound solid shot from its cannons. After two hours of fighting, Bannon requested that the British surrender. Fortunatus struck her colors. None of Liberty's crew were wounded or dead, while only five of the fifty men aboard the British ship were capable of operating a cannon. The prize was sold at auction.

On July 3, 1780, James Barron gave command of the schooner to the Virginia Navy. In August, Liberty served as an escort to the Virginian brig Jefferson in sailing up to Tangier Island. They were also accompanied by Patriot. The small squadron took five prizes and their success led to joint missions between the navies of Virginia and Maryland that were conducted in the northern Chesapeake Bay until mid-October. Liberty served as a dispatch boat after the arrival of Marquis de Lafayette's Continental forces. In the early hours of March 7, 1781, Liberty ran aground on a mud bank. Enemy boats captured her crew and made off with her sails and stores. The schooner was refloated and returned to Virginian service days later. On April 27, seven Virginian ships were destroyed by Benedict Arnold's forces at Osbourne's Warf on the James River. Liberty was now the last ship operated by the Virginia Navy.

In May 1781, Cornwallis' forces entered Virginia. To avoid capture and usage by the British, Liberty was stripped of her masts and sunk in a hole in the Nansemond River, a tributary of the James River. During the Siege of Yorktown, Liberty was raised and used to transport provisions for the Continental Army. Three other vessels assisted Liberty in this service, as they had specifically been purchased to serve in that capacity. For the duration of the war following May 1782, Liberty was used as a cruiser to protect the Chesapeake Bay and was commanded by Michael James. After the end of the war in 1783, the schooner served as a revenue cutter. She and Patriot were the only two vessels kept by Virginia. James Barron continued commanding Liberty until he died in 1787. After the ratification of the US Constitution in 1788, she was sold and served the remainder of her career as a freight carrier in the West Indies.

Liberty was the only vessel in the Virginia Navy not to be captured by British forces and the only vessel in the Virginia Navy to serve for the full duration of the war. The schooner was operated by the Virginia Navy from 1775 to 1787. She flew the Continental Union Flag.
