= James S. Jones =

American politician

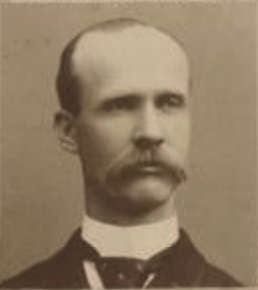

Member of the Virginia House of Delegates from King and Queen County
- In office December 4, 1889 – June 10, 1894
- Preceded by: Henry R. Pollard
- Succeeded by: George C. Bland

Personal details
- Born: James Smith Jones; December 7, 1853
- Died: June 10, 1894 (aged 40)
- Party: Democratic

James Smith Jones (December 7, 1853 – June 10, 1894) was an American politician who served in the Virginia House of Delegates.
