= George C. Bland =

American politician

Member of the Virginia House of Delegates from King and Queen County
- In office December 4, 1901 – January 13, 1904
- Preceded by: J. W. Fleet
- Succeeded by: James M. Lewis
- In office December 4, 1895 – December 6, 1899
- Preceded by: James S. Jones
- Succeeded by: J. W. Fleet

Personal details
- Born: George Carter Bland; December 13, 1848 Shacklefords, Virginia, U.S.
- Died: September 3, 1938 (aged 89) Shacklefords, Virginia, U.S.
- Party: Democratic
- Spouse: Cora Anderson

George Carter Bland (December 13, 1848 – September 3, 1938) was an American politician who served in the Virginia House of Delegates.
