= USS Merrimack (1855) =

U.S. Navy Steam frigate

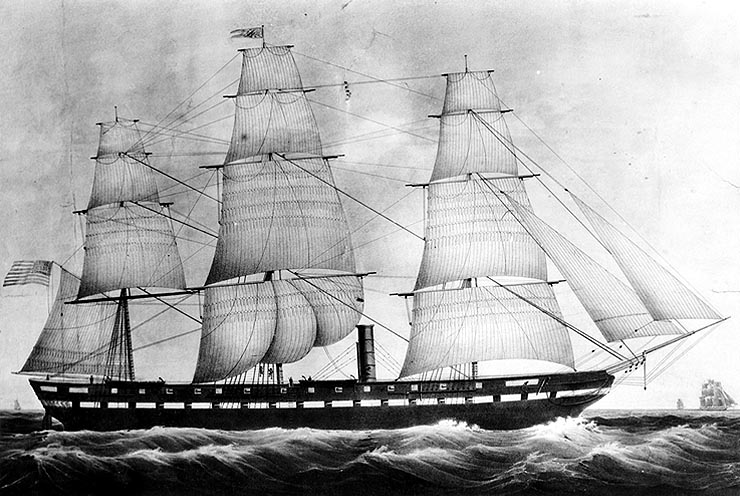
- USS Merrimack; Engraving by L.H. Bradford & Co., after a drawing by G.G. Pook

History

United States
- Name: Merrimack
- Ordered: 6 April 1855
- Launched: 15 June 1855
- Commissioned: 20 February 1856
- Decommissioned: 16 February 1860
- Fate: Burned and sunk in dock, 20 April 1861; Raised and converted into ironclad CSS Virginia

General characteristics
- Tonnage: 3,200
- Length: 275 ft (84 m)
- Beam: 38.5 ft (11.7 m)
- Draft: 24 ft (7.3 m)
- Propulsion: sail, steam engine
- Speed: 12 knots
- Armament: 14 × 8-inch guns, 2 × 10-inch guns, 24 × 9-inch guns

USS Merrimack, variant spelling Merrimac, was a steam frigate, best known as the hull upon which the ironclad warship CSS Virginia was constructed during the American Civil War. The CSS Virginia then took part in the Battle of Hampton Roads (also known as "the Battle of the Monitor and the Merrimack") in the first engagement between ironclad warships.

Merrimack was the first of six screw frigates (steam frigates powered by screw propellers) begun in 1854. Like others of her class (Wabash, Roanoke, Niagara, Minnesota and Colorado), she was named after a river. The Merrimack originates in New Hampshire and flows through the town of Merrimac, Massachusetts, often considered an older spelling which has sometimes caused confusion of the name. After the ship was burned on April 20 1861, it was rebuilt with iron siding in the American Civil War by the Confederacy and renamed Virginia.

== History ==
USS Merrimack sectional view

=== Creation ===
Merrimack was launched by the Boston Navy Yard 15 June 1855, sponsored by Mary E. Simmons, and commissioned 20 February 1856, Captain Garrett J. Pendergrast in command. She was the second ship of the Navy to be named for the Merrimack River.

=== Service ===
Shakedown cruises took the new screw frigate to the Caribbean and to Western Europe. Merrimack visited Southampton, Brest, Lisbon, and Toulon before returning to Boston and decommissioning 22 April 1857 for repairs. Recommissioning 1 September 1857, Merrimack got underway from Boston Harbor 17 October as flagship for the Pacific Squadron. She rounded Cape Horn and cruised the Pacific coast of South and Central America until heading for home 14 November 1859. Upon returning to Norfolk, she decommissioned 16 February 1860.

Merrimack was still in ordinary during the crisis preceding Lincoln's inauguration. Soon after becoming Secretary of the Navy, Gideon Welles took action to prepare the frigate for sea, planning to move her to Philadelphia. The day before the firing on Fort Sumter, Welles directed that "great vigilance be exercised in guarding and protecting" Norfolk Navy Yard and her ships. On the afternoon of 17 April 1861, the day Virginia seceded, Engineer in Chief B. F. Isherwood managed to get the frigate's engines lit off; but the previous night secessionists had sunk light boats in the channel between Craney Island and Sewell's Point, blocking Merrimack. On 20 April, before evacuating the Navy Yard, the U.S. Navy burned Merrimack to the waterline and sank her to preclude capture.

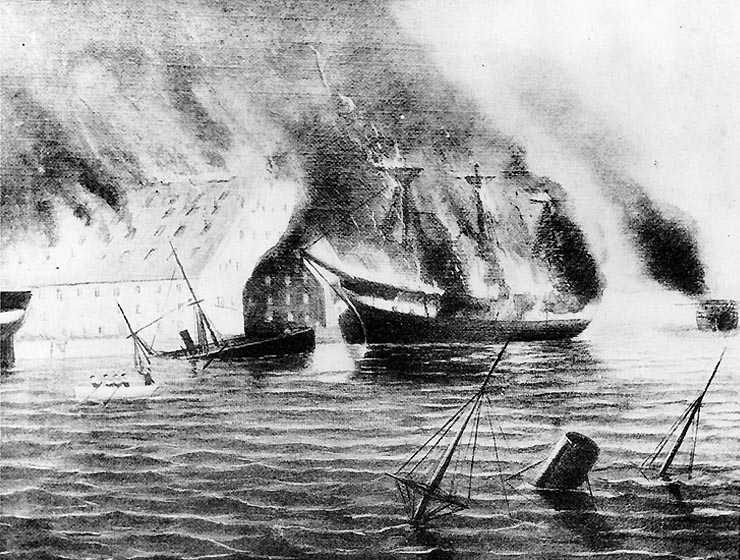
USS Merrimack aflame during the burning of the Norfolk Navy Yard, 20 April 1861

The Confederacy, in desperate need of ships, raised Merrimack and rebuilt her as an ironclad ram, according to a design prepared by Lt. John Mercer Brooke, CSN. Commissioned as CSS Virginia 17 February 1862, the ironclad was the hope of the Confederacy to destroy the wooden ships in Hampton Roads, and to end the Union blockade which had already seriously impeded the Confederate war effort.

== See also ==
- List of steam frigates of the United States Navy
- Union Navy
- Ships captured in the American Civil War
- Bibliography of American Civil War naval history

== Bibliography ==
- Canney, Donald L. (1990). The Old Steam Navy: Frigates, Slops and Gunboats, 1815–1882. Vol. 1. Annapolis, Maryland: Naval Institute Press. ISBN 0-87021-004-1.
- Chesneau, Roger; Kolesnik, Eugene M., eds. (1979). Conway's All the World's Fighting Ships 1860–1905. Greenwich, UK: Conway Maritime Press. ISBN 0-8317-0302-4.
- "Merrimack". Dictionary of American Naval Fighting Ships. Naval History & Heritage Command (NH&HC). Archived from the original on 14 March 2004.
- Olmstead, Edwin; Stark, Wayne E.; Tucker, Spencer C. (1997). The Big Guns: Civil War Siege, Seacoast, and Naval Cannon. Alexandria Bay, New York: Museum Restoration Service. ISBN 0-88855-012-X.
- Silverstone, Paul H. (2006). Civil War Navies 1855–1883. The U.S. Navy Warship Series. New York: Routledge. ISBN 0-415-97870-X.
- Nelson, James L. 2004. The Reign of Iron: The Story of the First Battling Ironclads, the Monitor and the Merrimack. HarperCollins Publishers, NY. ISBN 0-06-052403-0.
