= Confederate States Secretary of the Navy =

Secretary of the Navy
- Seal of the Navy Department

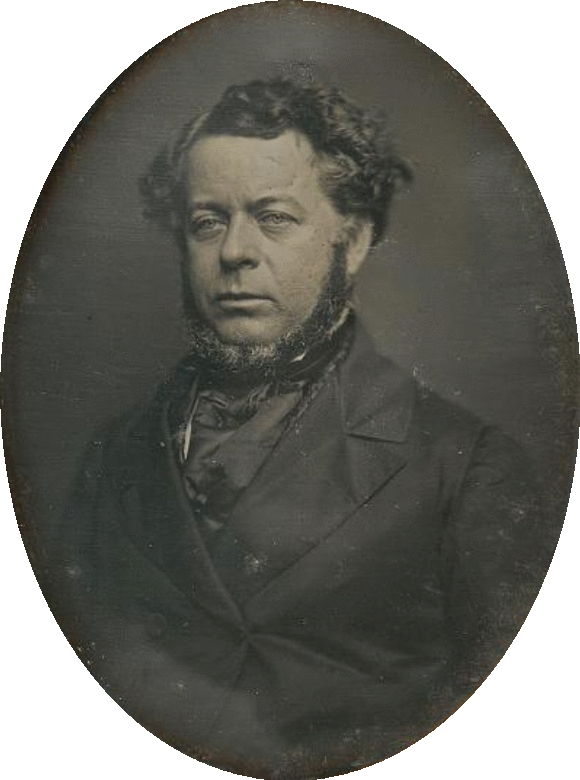
- Only officeholder Stephen R. Mallory; March 4, 1861–May 20, 1865
- Department of the Navy
- Style: Mr. Secretary
- Member of: The Cabinet
- Reports to: The president
- Seat: Richmond, Virginia
- Appointer: The president with Senate advice and consent
- Formation: March 4, 1861
- Abolished: May 20, 1865

The Confederate States secretary of the navy was the head of the Confederate States Department of the Navy. Stephen R. Mallory held this position through the entire duration of the Confederate States of America.

== Secretary of the Navy ==
No.	Portrait	Name (born–died)	Term of office			Party	Cabinet
No.	Portrait	Name (born–died)	Took office	Left office	Time in office	Party	Cabinet
1		Stephen R. Mallory (1812–1873)	March 4, 1861	May 20, 1865	4 years, 77 days	Democratic (Note: While organized political parties did not exist in the Confederacy, Mallory was affiliated with the Democratic Party before and after the American Civil War.)	Davis

== See also ==
- United States Secretary of the Navy
