= Military forces of the Confederate States =

- Seal of the Confederate States
- Founded: March 6, 1861; 165 years ago
- Disbanded: 1865; 161 years ago
- Service branches: Confederate States Army; Confederate States Navy: Confederate States Marine Corps
- Headquarters: War Department, Richmond

Leadership
- Commander-in-Chief: Jefferson Davis
- Secretary of War: John C. Breckinridge (last)
- Secretary of the Navy: Stephen Mallory
- General in Chief: Robert E. Lee

Personnel
- Conscription: Yes (enacted 1862)

Related articles
- Ranks: Military ranks of the Confederate States

CSA Battle Flag

CSA Naval Ensign (since 1863)

CSA Naval Jack (since 1863)

The military forces of the Confederate States, also known as Confederate forces or the Confederate Armed Forces and Confederate States Armed Forces, were the military services responsible for the defense of the Confederate States of America during its existence (1861–1865).

== Organization ==
The military forces of the Confederate States had three services:

- Confederate States Army – The Confederate States Army (CSA) the land-based military operations. The CS Army was established in two phases with provisional and permanent organizations, which existed concurrently.
  - The Provisional Army of the Confederate States (PACS) was authorized by Act of Congress on February 23, 1861, and began organizing on April 27.
  - The Army of Confederate States was the regular army, organized by Act of Congress on March 6, 1861. It was authorized to include 15,015 men, including 744 officers, but this level was never achieved. The men serving in the highest rank as Confederate States generals, such as Samuel Cooper and Robert E. Lee, were enrolled in the ACSA to ensure that they outranked all militia officers.
  - Confederate States State militias were organized and commanded by the state governments, similar to those authorized by the United States Militia Act of 1792.
  - Confederate Home Guard – a somewhat loosely organized though nevertheless legitimate organization that was under the vague direction and authority of the Confederate States of America, working in coordination with the Confederate Army, and was tasked with both the defense of the Confederate home front during the American Civil War, as well as to help track down and capture Confederate Army deserters.
- Confederate States Navy – responsible for Confederate naval operations during the American Civil War. The two major tasks of the Confederate Navy during the whole of its existence were the protection of Southern harbors and coastlines from outside invasion, and making the war costly for the North by attacking merchant ships and breaking the Union Blockade.
- Confederate States Marine Corps – Established by an act of the Congress of the Confederate States on March 16, 1861. The CSMC's manpower was initially authorized at 45 officers and 944 enlisted men, and was increased on September 24, 1862 to 1026 enlisted men. The organization of the Marines began at Montgomery, Alabama, and was completed at Richmond, Virginia, when the capital of the Confederate States of America was moved to that location. The CSMC headquarters and main training facilities remained in Richmond, Virginia, throughout the war, located at Camp Beall on Drewry's Bluff and at the Gosport Shipyard in Norfolk, Virginia.

== Command and control ==
Control and operation of the Confederate States Army was administered by the Confederate States War Department, which was established by the Confederate Provisional Congress in an act on February 21, 1861. The Confederate Congress gave control over military operations, and authority for mustering state forces and volunteers to the president of the Confederate States of America on February 28, 1861 and March 6, 1861. By May 8, a provision authorizing enlistments for war was enacted, calling for 400,000 volunteers to serve for one or three years. By April 1862, the Confederate States of America found it necessary to pass a conscription act, which drafted men into PACS.

The Confederate military leadership included many veterans from the United States Army and United States Navy who had resigned their federal commissions and had won appointment to senior positions in the Confederate armed forces. Many had served in the Mexican–American War (including Robert E. Lee and Jefferson Davis), but others had little or no military experience (such as Leonidas Polk, who had attended West Point.) The Confederate officer corps was composed in part of young men from slave-owning families, but many came from non-owners. The Confederacy appointed junior and field grade officers by election from the enlisted ranks. Although no Army service academy was established for the Confederacy, many colleges of the South (such as the Citadel and the Virginia Military Institute) maintained cadet corps that were seen as a training ground for Confederate military leadership. A naval academy was established at Drewry's Bluff, Virginia, in 1863, but no midshipmen had graduated by the time the Confederacy collapsed.

The soldiers of the Confederate armed forces consisted mainly of white males with an average age between sixteen and twenty-eight. The Confederacy adopted conscription in 1862. Many thousands of slaves served as laborers, cooks, and pioneers. Some freed blacks and men of color served in local state militia units of the Confederacy, primarily in Louisiana and South Carolina, but their officers deployed them for "local defense, not combat." Depleted by casualties and desertions, the military suffered chronic manpower shortages. In the spring of 1865 the Confederate Congress, influenced by the public support by General Lee, approved the recruitment of black infantry units. Contrary to Lee's and Davis' recommendations, the Congress refused "to guarantee the freedom of black volunteers." No more than two hundred troops were ever raised. However, President Davis believed that blacks would not fight unless they were provided freedom in exchange for their service. Therefore, he waited until Congress adjourned and then stipulated by executive order that any African-American accepted into service on the congressional act must be a volunteer and be accompanied by manumission papers.

=== Military leaders ===
Military leaders of the Confederacy (with their state or country of birth and highest rank) included:

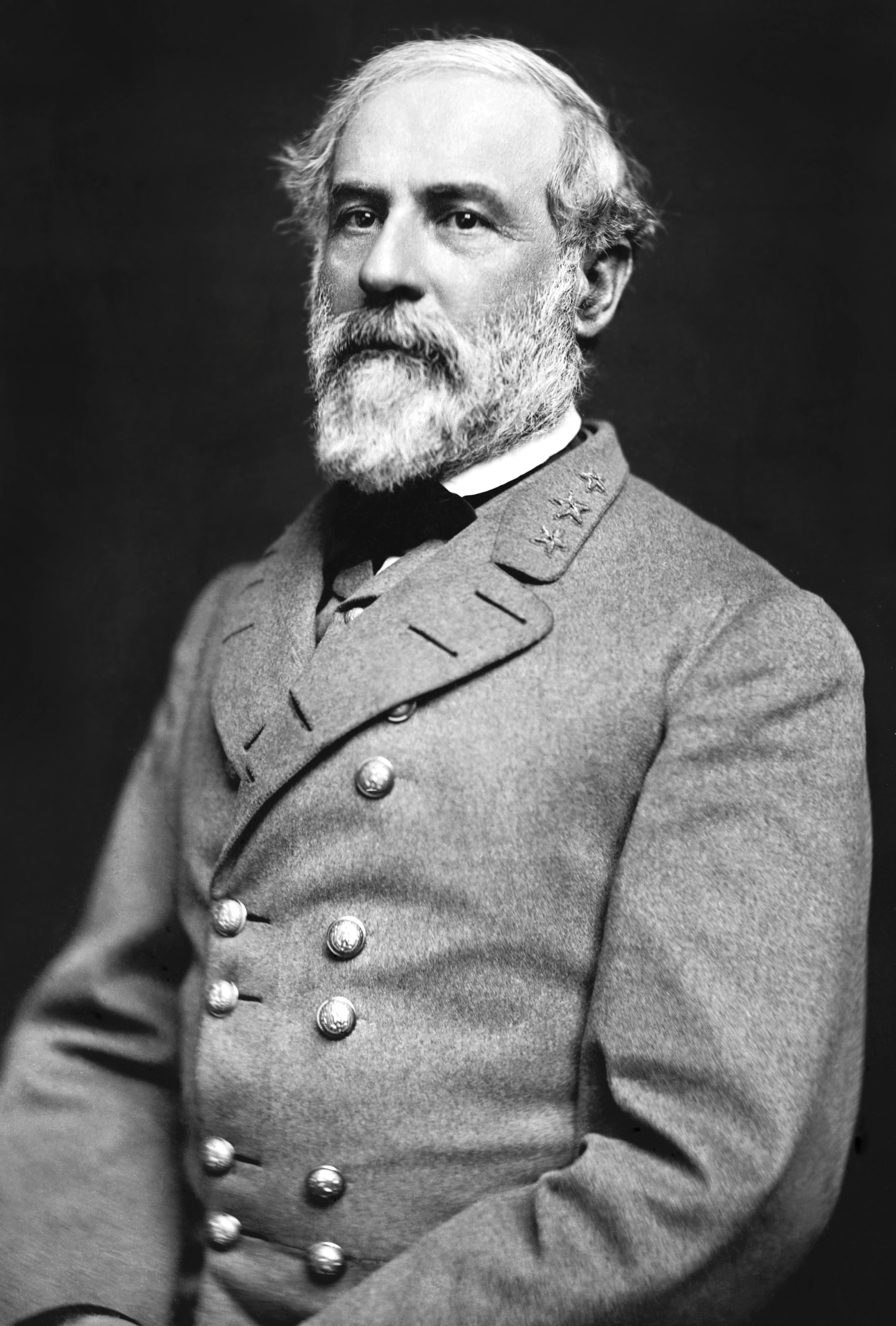
General Robert E. Lee, for many, the face of the Confederate Army

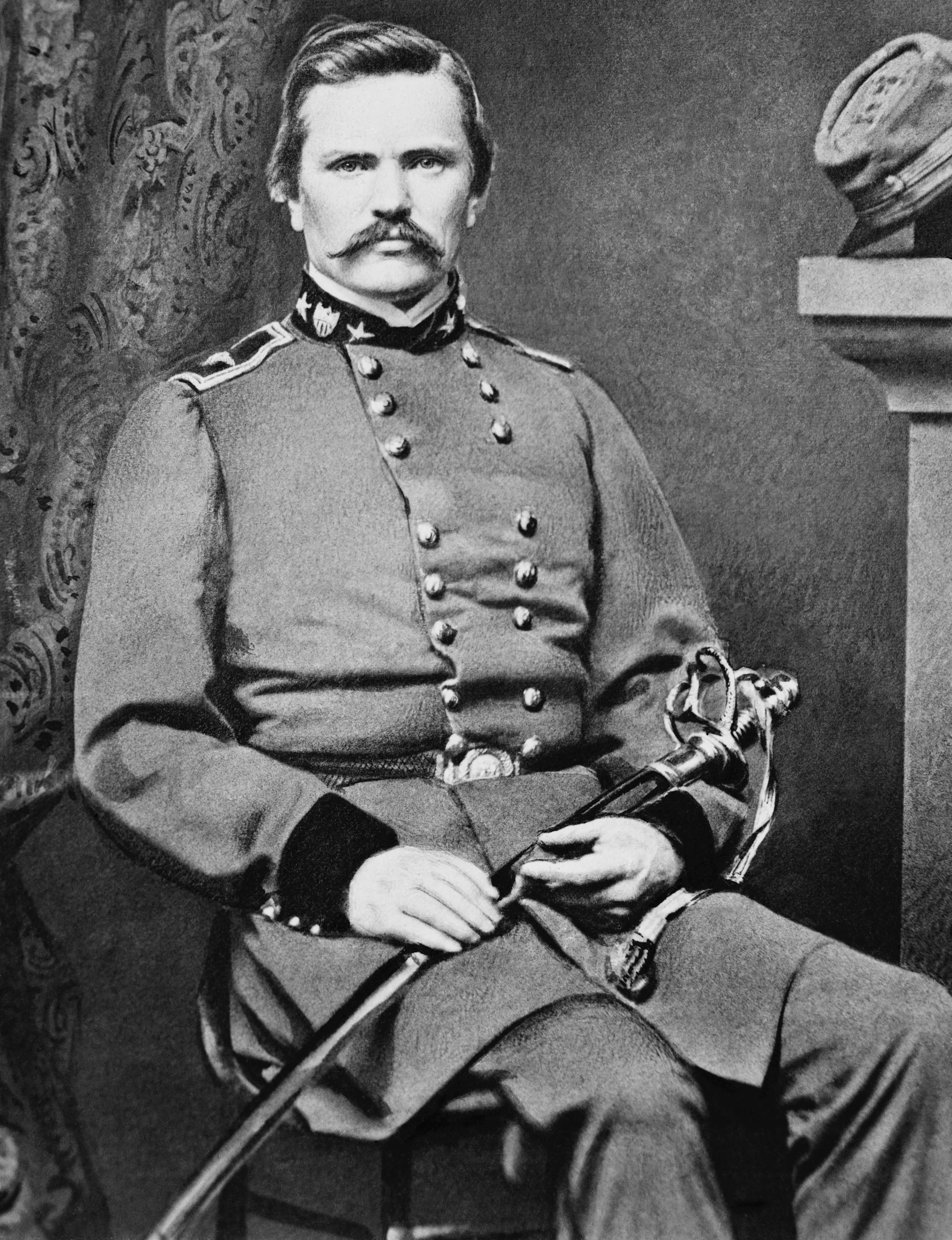
General Simon Bolivar Buckner Sr

- Robert E. Lee (Virginia) – General and General-in-Chief (1865)
- Samuel Cooper (New York) – General
- Albert Sidney Johnston (Kentucky) – General
- Joseph E. Johnston (Virginia) – General
- Braxton Bragg (North Carolina) – General
- P.G.T. Beauregard (Louisiana) – General
- James Longstreet (Georgia) – Lieutenant General
- Thomas J. "Stonewall" Jackson (Virginia) – Lieutenant General
- Leonidas Polk (North Carolina) – Lieutenant General
- Richard S. Ewell (Virginia) – Lieutenant General
- A.P. Hill (Virginia) – Lieutenant General
- John Bell Hood (Kentucky) – Lieutenant General and General (temporary)
- Richard Taylor (Kentucky) – Lieutenant General (Son of U.S. President Zachary Taylor)
- Simon Bolivar Buckner Sr (Kentucky) – Lieutenant General
- Wade Hampton III (South Carolina) – Lieutenant General
- Jubal Anderson Early (Virginia) – Lieutenant General
- Nathan Bedford Forrest (Tennessee) – Lieutenant General
- Alexander Peter Stewart (Tennessee) – Lieutenant General
- Sterling Price (Virginia) – Major General
- J.E.B. Stuart (Virginia) – Major General
- George Edward Pickett (Virginia) – Major General
- Stephen Dodson Ramseur (North Carolina) – Major General
- Patrick Cleburne (Ireland) – Major General
- Camille Armand Jules Marie, Prince de Polignac (France) – Major General
- John Austin Wharton (Tennessee) – Major General
- Thomas L. Rosser (Virginia) – Major General
- Franklin Buchanan (Maryland) – Rear Admiral
- Raphael Semmes (Maryland) – Rear Admiral and Brigadier General
- Josiah Tattnall III (Georgia) – Commodore
- Edward Porter Alexander (Georgia) – Brigadier General
- Stand Watie (Georgia) – Brigadier General (last to surrender)
- John Hunt Morgan (Kentucky) – Brigadier General
- Moxley Sorrel (Georgia) – Brigadier General
- Lloyd J. Beall (South Carolina) – Colonel-Commandant of the Confederate States Marine Corps

== African Americans in the Confederate military ==
A small number of free persons of color in New Orleans formed the 1st Louisiana Native Guard (CSA) as part of the Louisiana militia. The unit temporarily disbanded on February 15, 1862, after Louisiana law stated the militia could only be made up of white men. They were recalled to service during the Union invasion of New Orleans and permanently disbanded on April 25, 1862. Some of the soldiers later joined the Union Army.

"Nearly 40% of the Confederacy's population were unfree ... the work required to sustain the same society during war naturally fell disproportionately on black shoulders as well. By drawing so many white men into the army, indeed, the war multiplied the importance of the black work force." Even Georgia's governor Joseph E. Brown noted that "the country and the army are mainly dependent upon slave labor for support." Slave labor was used in a wide variety of support roles, from infrastructure and mining, to teamster and medical roles such as hospital attendants and nurses.

The idea of arming slaves for use as soldiers was speculated on from the onset of the war, but not seriously considered by Davis or others in his administration. Though an acrimonious and controversial debate was raised by a letter from Patrick Cleburne urging the Confederacy to raise black soldiers by offering emancipation, it would not be until Robert E. Lee wrote the Confederate Congress urging them that the idea would take serious traction. On March 13, 1865, the Confederate Congress passed General Order 14, and President Davis signed the order into law. The order was issued March 23, but only a few black companies were raised. Two companies were armed and drilled in the streets of Richmond, Virginia, shortly before the besieged southern capital fell. However, President Davis considered it imperative that blacks be offered freedom in exchange for military service under terms of the act passed through Congress. Therefore, he waited for Congress to adjourn and then stipulated by executive order that any African-Americans accepted as soldiers under terms of the act must be volunteers and be accompanied by manumission papers.

== Supply ==
Much like the Continental Army in the American Revolution, state governments were supposed to supply their soldiers. The supply situation for most Confederate Armies was dismal even when victorious. The lack of central authority and effective transportation infrastructure, especially the railroads, combined the frequent unwillingness or inability of Southern state governments to provide adequate funding, were key factors in the Army's demise. Individual commanders had to "beg, borrow or steal" food and ammunition from whatever sources were available, including captured Union depots and encampments, and private citizens regardless of their loyalties. Lee's campaign against Gettysburg and southern Pennsylvania (a rich agricultural region) was driven in part by his desperate need of supplies, namely food. Not surprisingly, in addition to slowing the Confederate advance such foraging aroused anger in the North and led many Northerners to support General Sherman's total warfare tactics as retaliation. Scorched earth policies especially in Georgia, South Carolina and the Virginian Shenandoah Valley proved far more devastating than anything Pennsylvania had suffered and further reduced the capacity of the increasingly effectively blockaded Confederacy to feed even its civilian population, let alone its Army. At many points during the war, and especially near the end, Confederate Armies were described as starving and, indeed, many died from lack of food and related illnesses. Towards more desperate stages of the war, the lack of food became a principal driving force for desertion.

== Uniforms ==
See article: Uniforms of the Confederate Military

The Uniforms of the Confederate States military forces were the uniforms used by the Confederate Army and Navy during the American Civil War from 1861 to 1865. The uniform varied greatly due to a variety of reasons, such as location, limitations on the supply of cloth and other materials, and the cost of materials during the war.

Confederate forces were often poorly supplied with uniforms, especially late in the conflict. Servicemen sometimes wore combinations of uniform pieces combined with captured Union uniforms and items of personal clothing. They sometimes went without shoes altogether, and broad felt or straw hats were worn as often as kepis or naval caps.

== Statistics ==
Total Service members – 1,050,000 (Exact number is unknown. Posted figure is average of estimated range from 600,000 – 1,500,000)

Battle Deaths (Death figures are based on incomplete returns) – 74,524

Other Deaths (In Theater) – 59,297

Died in Union prisons – 26,000 to 31,000

Non-mortal Woundings – Unknown

At the end of the war 174,223 men surrendered to the Union Army.

== See also ==
- Conclusion of the American Civil War
- Confederate Government Civil War units
- Medicine in the American Civil War
