= 15th Confederate Cavalry Regiment =

Cavalry regiment of the Confederate States Army

- Active: 1864–1865
- Country: Confederate States
- Branch: Confederate States Army
- Type: Cavalry
- Size: Regiment
- Engagements: American Civil War: Skirmish with Knight Company, MS, 1864; Skirmish at Tunica, LA, 1864; Skirmish at Claiborne, AL, 1865

Commanders
- Notable commanders: Harry Maury

The 15th Confederate Cavalry Regiment was a unit of the Confederate States Army during the American Civil War. Assigned to the Department of the Gulf, the regiment was composed of Alabama and Florida cavalry companies, and took part in various actions around the Florida panhandle and Mobile Bay near the close of the war.

== History ==
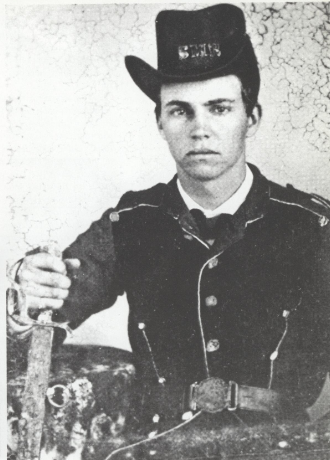
William D. Rogers, soldier of the 15th Confederate Cavalry from Florida. Rodgers was captured in November 1864, and died in the Prisoner-of-war camp on Ship Island, Mississippi in March 1865.

The 15th Confederate Cavalry was organized in early 1864 at Mobile, Alabama. The regiment consisted of five Florida companies, previously organized as the 3rd Florida Cavalry Battalion, and five Alabama companies. These cavalry companies had served on coastal defense prior to their consolidation into one regiment. As the new regiment contained units from more than one state, it was given a Confederate government regimental number rather than a state designation. The regiment was led by Colonel Harry Maury, who had previously served in the 2nd and 32nd Alabama Infantry Regiments.

The 15th was dispatched to Jones County, Mississippi to investigate the anti-Confederate rebellion there led by Newton Knight. On March 5, 1864, the regiment fought a battle with Knight's company of insurgents, and hung several local men as deserters from the Confederate Army. Colonel Maury believed he had put a stop to the rebellion, but Knight's defiance of Confederate authority continued after the 15th Cavalry left the region.

The 15th Confederate remained mostly in the vicinity of Mobile, Alabama and Pensacola, Florida, except for an excursion to Tunica, Louisiana in the fall of 1864. In the final months of the war, new recruits were gathered from Mobile, boosting the ranks of the 15th Confederate to 1200 men.

In the summer of 1864, the 15th Confederate was deployed along the route of the Alabama and Florida railroad, opposing Union General Alexander Asboth's forces and fighting small skirmishes in the vicinity of Pensacola, Florida. In the final stages of the war, a portion of the regiment clashed with Federal troops at Claiborne, Alabama on April 11, 1865, where 72 of them were captured by the Union army. The remaining troops of the regiment surrendered at Demopolis, Alabama at the close of the war.

== Commanders ==
Commanders of the 15th Confederate Cavalry Regiment:

- Col. Harry Maury
- Lt. Col. T.J. Myers

== Organization ==
Companies of the 15th Confederate Cavalry Regiment:

- Company A, "Magnolia Dragoons", of Jefferson County, Florida.
- Company E, "Simpson Mounted Rangers", formerly Company C of the 3rd Florida Cavalry Battalion.
- Company G, "Mobile Dragoons", of Alabama.

== See also ==
- List of Confederate Government units in the American Civil War
