= Military ranks of the Confederate States =

Military ranks of the Confederate States was a ranking system devised in 1861 for use within the military of the Confederate States.

== Confederate States Army ==
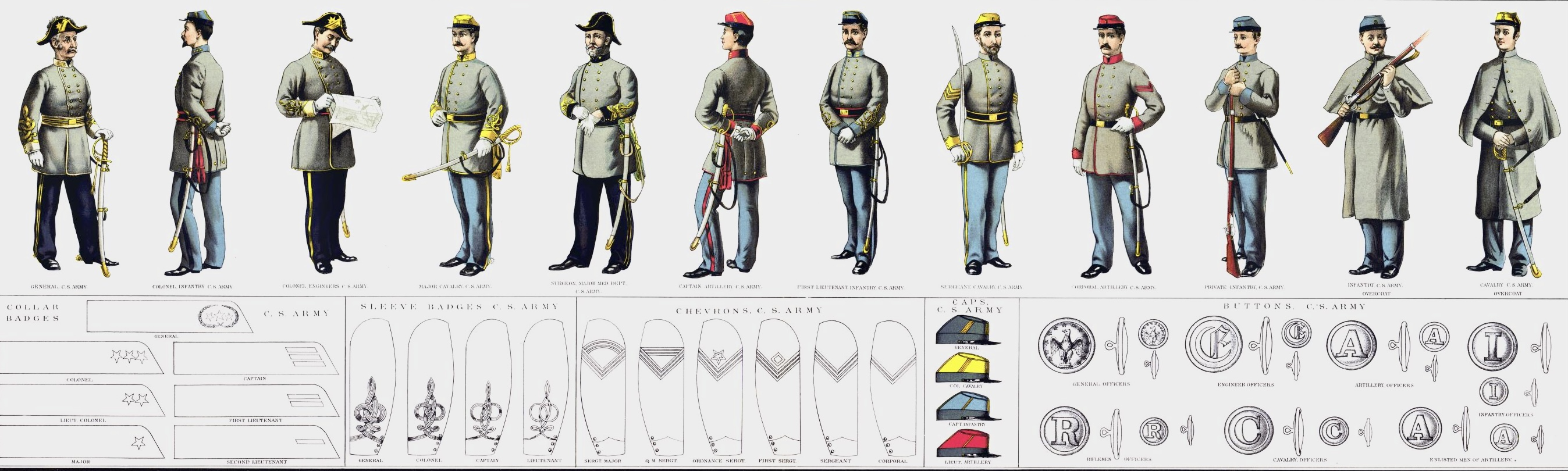
C.S. Army uniforms and insignia, War of the Rebellion Atlas (1895)

=== Officers ===
At the beginning of the Civil War, the ranks and rank insignias for the fledgling Confederate States Army had to be developed while the volunteer forces of the individual states that formed the Confederacy made up their own ranks and insignias. They usually were similar or influenced by both their own militia traditions and those used by the regular United States Army.

Officers wore, according to regulations, a combination of several rank indicators on their uniform. The primary insignia was a number of bars or stars worn on the collar of the uniform coat or tunic. This was occasionally substituted for, or coupled with, shoulder straps. The secondary insignia were Austrian knots, elaborate patterns sewed on the lower sleeves with the number of lines indicating the rank. In 1862 those were ordered not be worn on the field uniform and thus mostly relegated to parade dress. In addition the regulation Kepi had a similar knot pattern on sides and top but other hats without insignia were frequently worn.

Most junior officers wore tunics and coats with a single row of seven buttons while field officers wore two rows, however there were exceptions. Generals could be recognized by the eagles on their buttons and the placement of the buttons in groups of two. While there was no official insignia distinction for different grades of general, all wearing three stars in a wreath on the collar, some major generals adopted the pattern of their Union counterparts by wearing two rows of nine buttons in groups of three.

Rank group	General / flag officers	Senior officers			Junior officers
Kepi
Collar and sleeve insignia
Collar and sleeve insignia	Generals	Colonel (infantry)	Lieutenant colonel (staff or engineers)	Major (medical service)	Captain (marine corps)	First lieutenant (artillery)	Second lieutenant (cavalry)

=== Non-commissioned officers ===
Ranks were worn as chevrons on the right and left sleeves above the elbow. They were colored according to service branch:

- Infantry = Blue
- Artillery = Red
- Cavalry = Yellow
- Engineers = Yellow (or gold)
- Ordnance = Crimson
- Militia = Black (or gray)

Enlisted rank structure
Sergeant major	Quartermaster sergeant	Ordnance sergeant	First sergeant	Sergeant	Corporal	Musician	Private
						No insignia	No insignia

Brass shoulder scales were worn on dress uniforms, with different features to signify enlisted ranks. Shoulder scales were not normally worn on service or fatigue uniforms. When in full dress and sometimes also in battle, sergeants in non-mounted service branches carried the M1840 NCO sword suspending on a leather belt (except for hospital stewards who carried a special sword model). Additionally all ranks above sergeant (i.e. first sergeant, ordnance sergeant, hospital steward, sergeant major etc.) wore crimson worsted waist sashes (in the Confederate States Army, all sergeant ranks wore swords and worsted waist sashes: red for artillery and infantry, yellow for cavalry).

== Confederate States Navy ==
=== Officers ===
Officers of the Confederate States Navy used, just like the army, a combination of several rank insignias to indicate their rank. While both hat insignia and sleeve insignia were used here the primary indicator were shoulder straps. Only line officers wore those straps shown below as officers of various staff departments (medical, pay, engineering and naval construction) had separate ranks and different straps. Likewise the anchor symbol on the hats was substituted accordingly and they did not wear loops on the sleeve insignias.

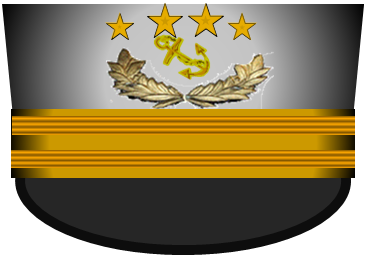
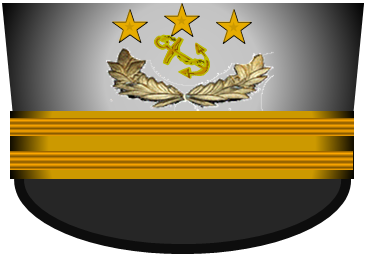
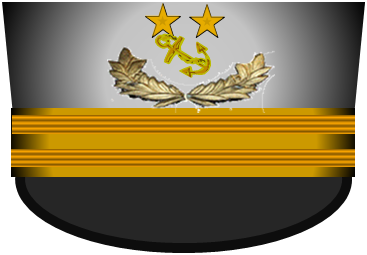
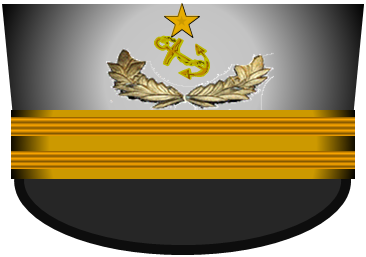
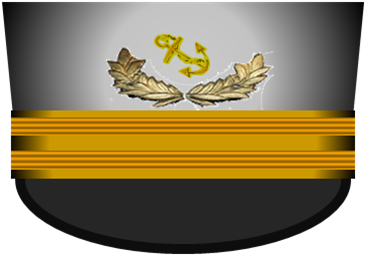
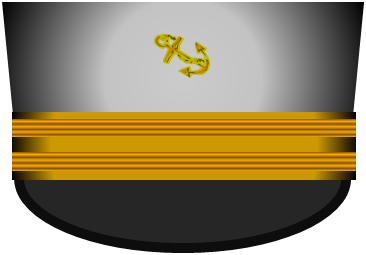
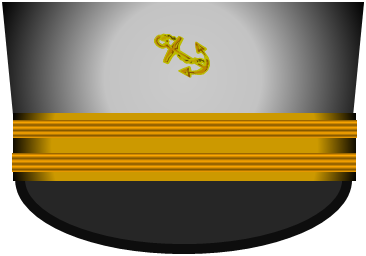
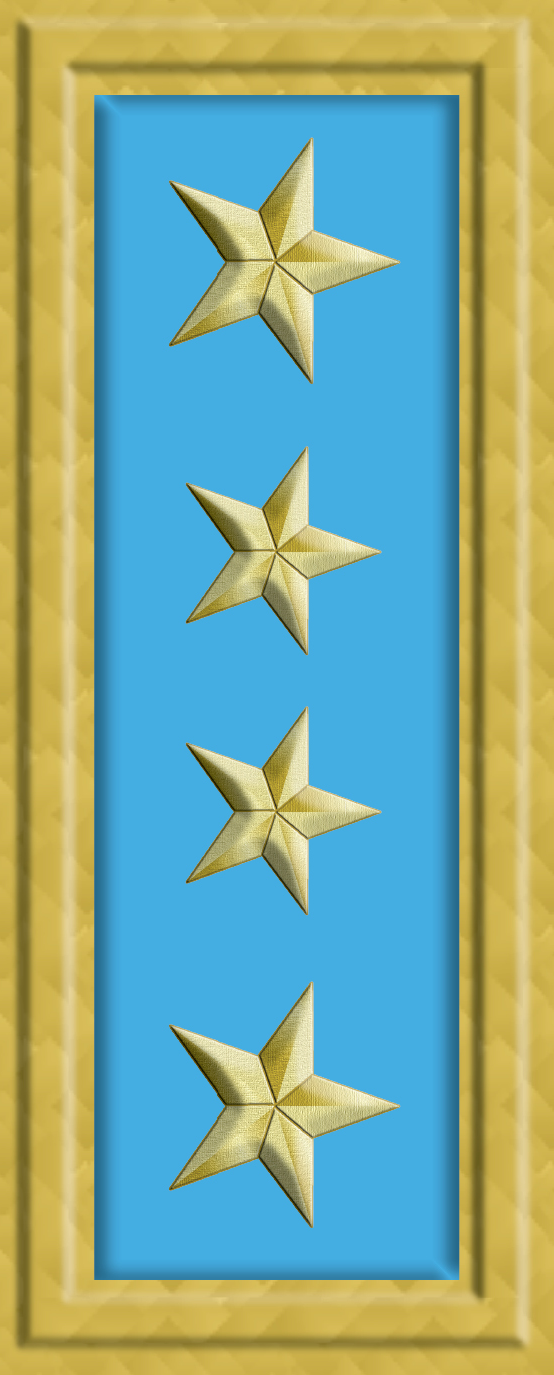
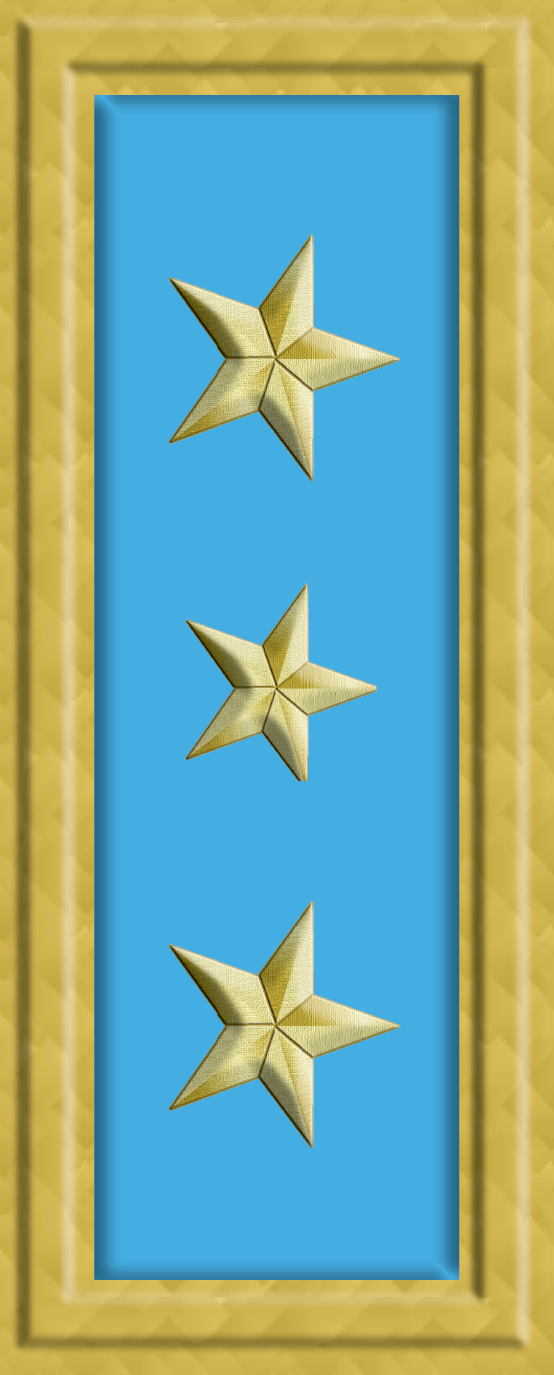
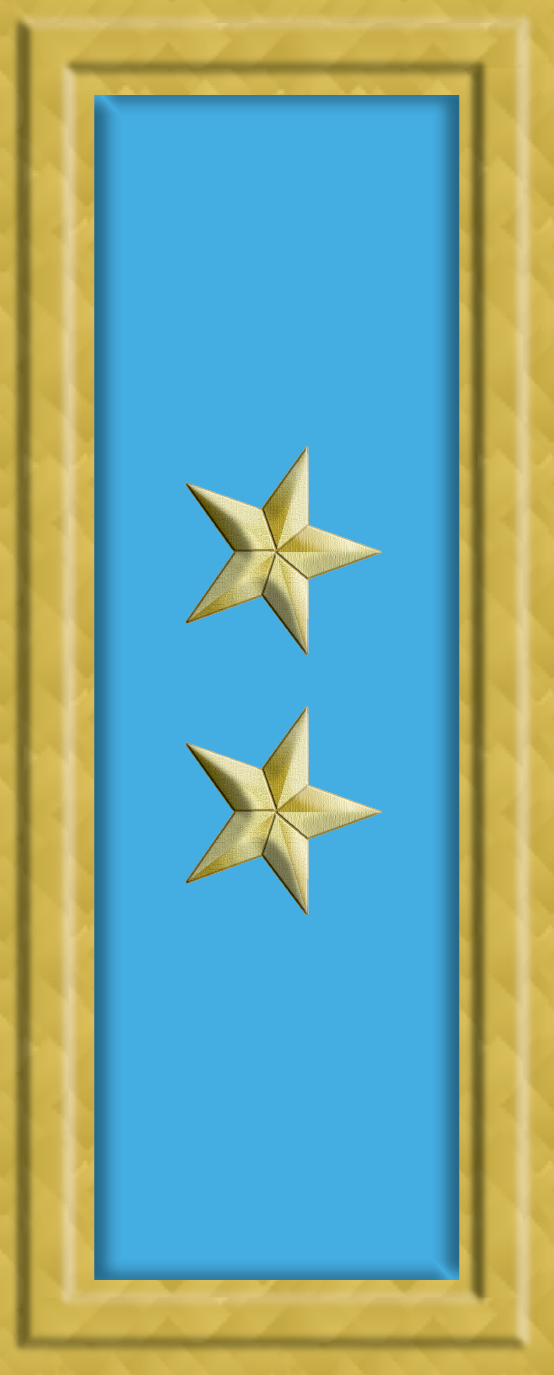
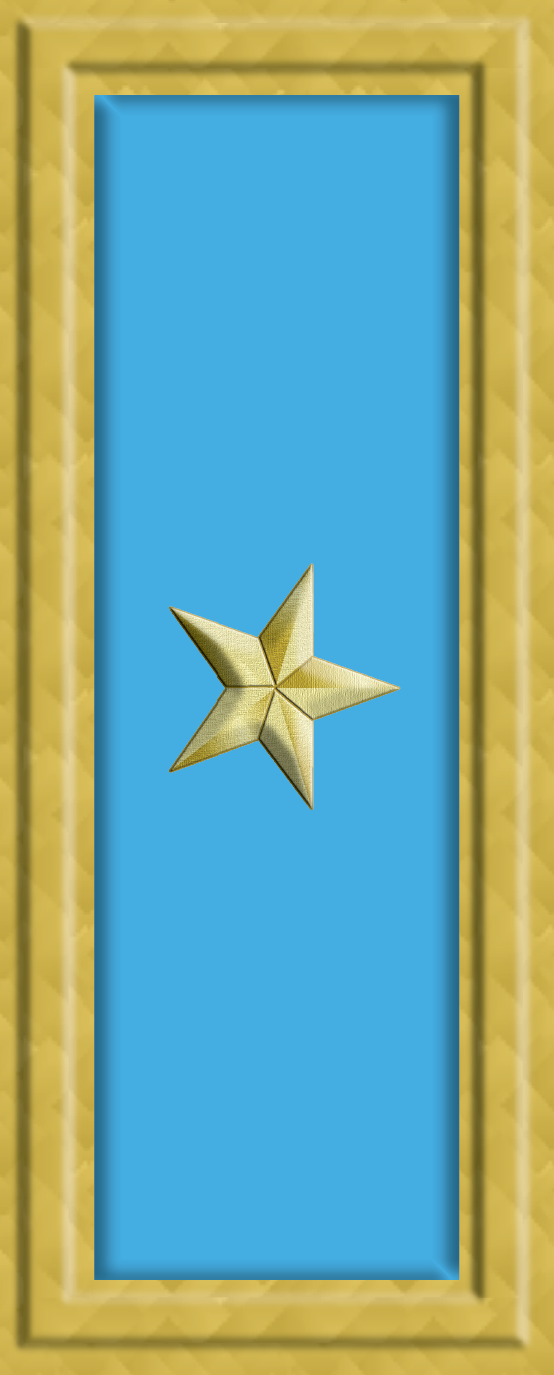
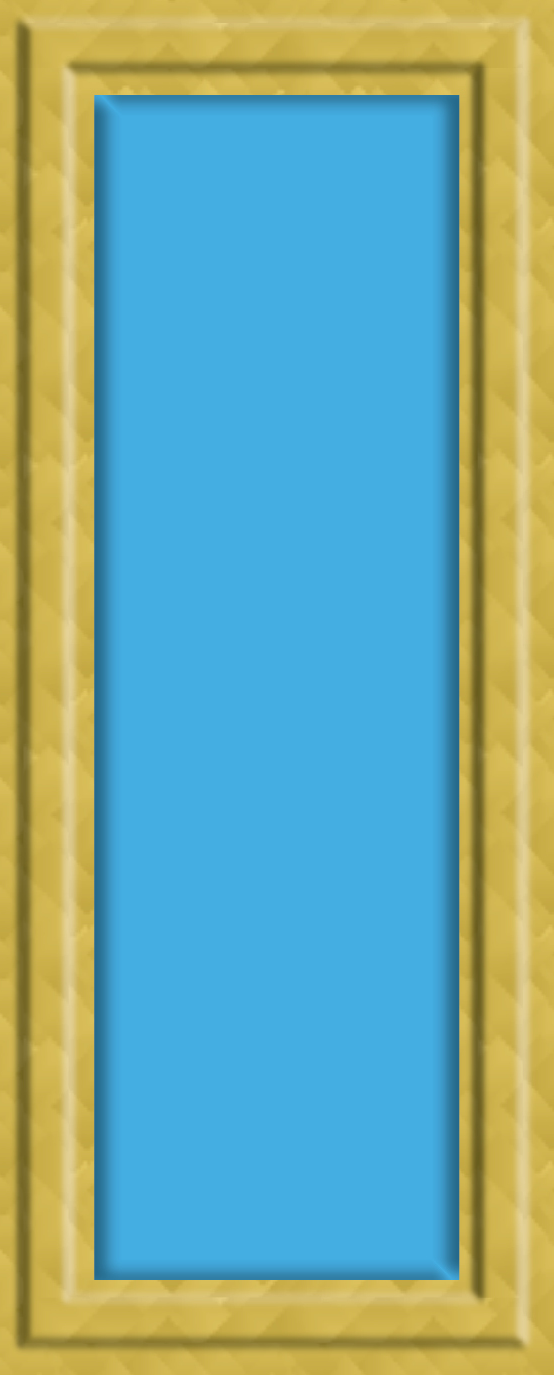
Rank group	General / flag officers	Senior officers		Junior officers
Hat
Shoulder							No insignia
Sleeve
	Flag officer	Captain	Commander	Lieutenant	Master	Passed midshipman	Midshipman

=== Enlisted ===
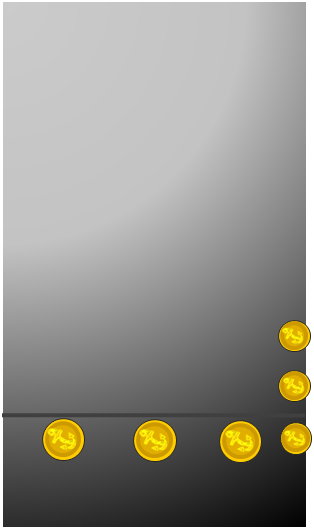
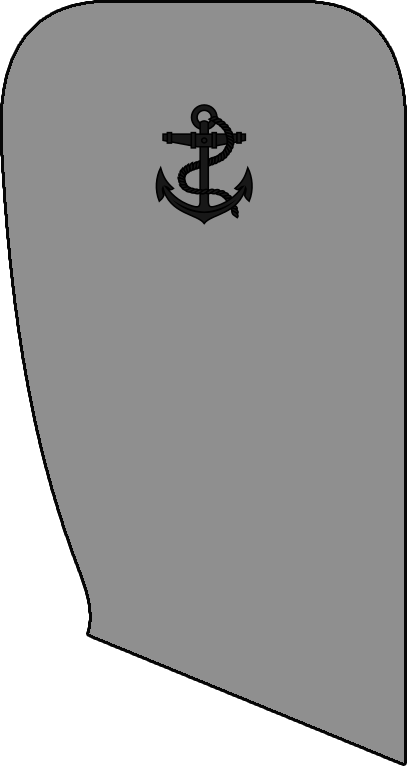
	Boatswain	Petty officer (Boatswain's mate and equivalent)	Petty officer (Quartermasters and equivalent)	Seaman
Sleeve

== Confederate States Marine Corps (CSMC) ==
The small Confederate States Marine Corps utilized insignia almost identical to that of the Army with the major difference being changes in color or facing direction of chevrons.

=== Officers ===
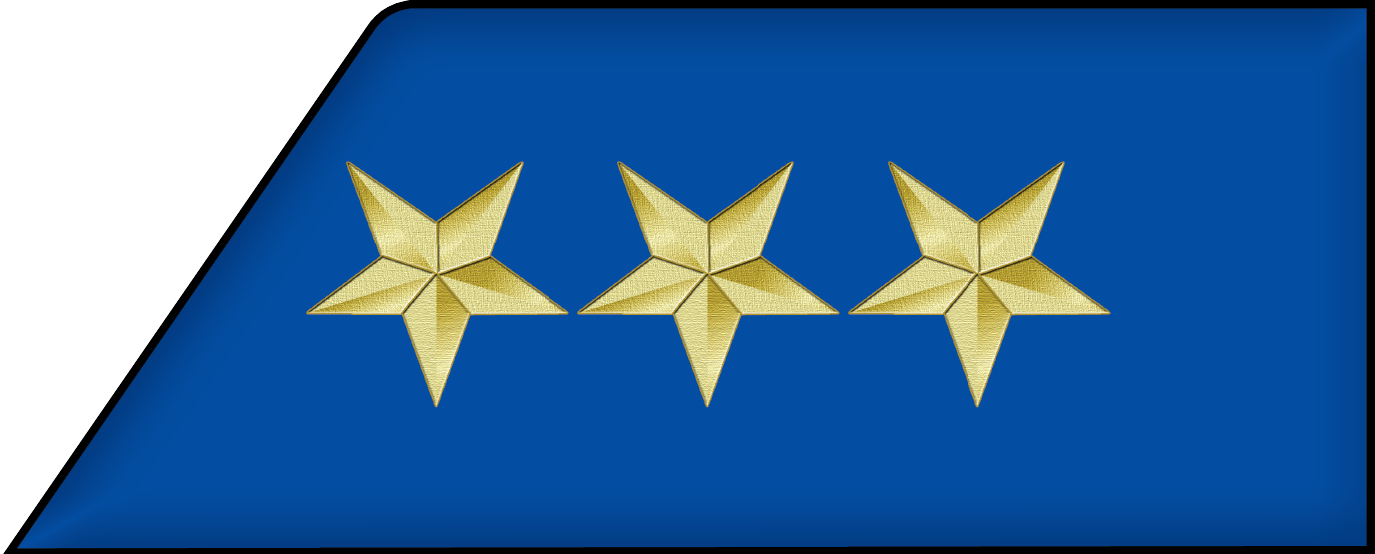
Colonel-commandant

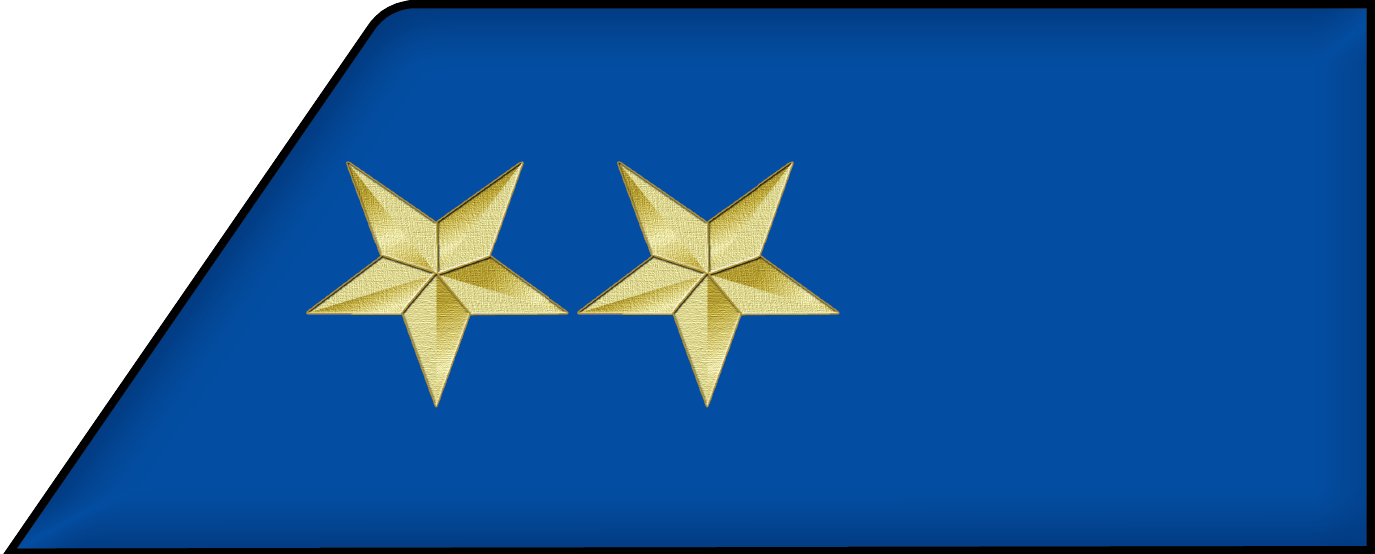
Lieutenant colonel

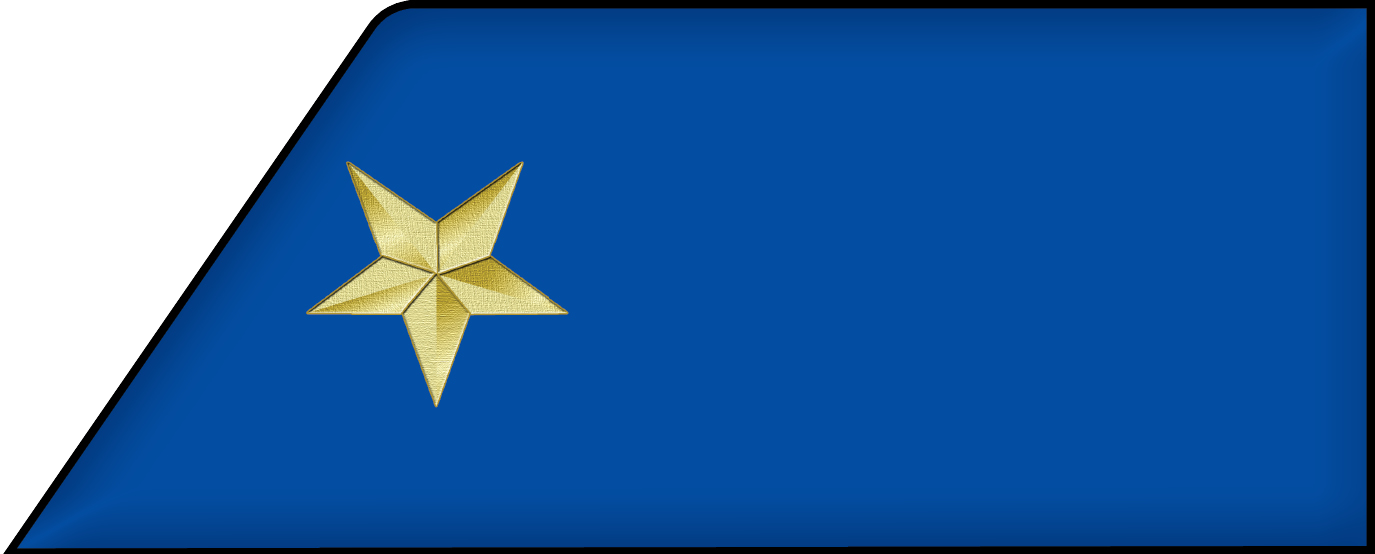
Major

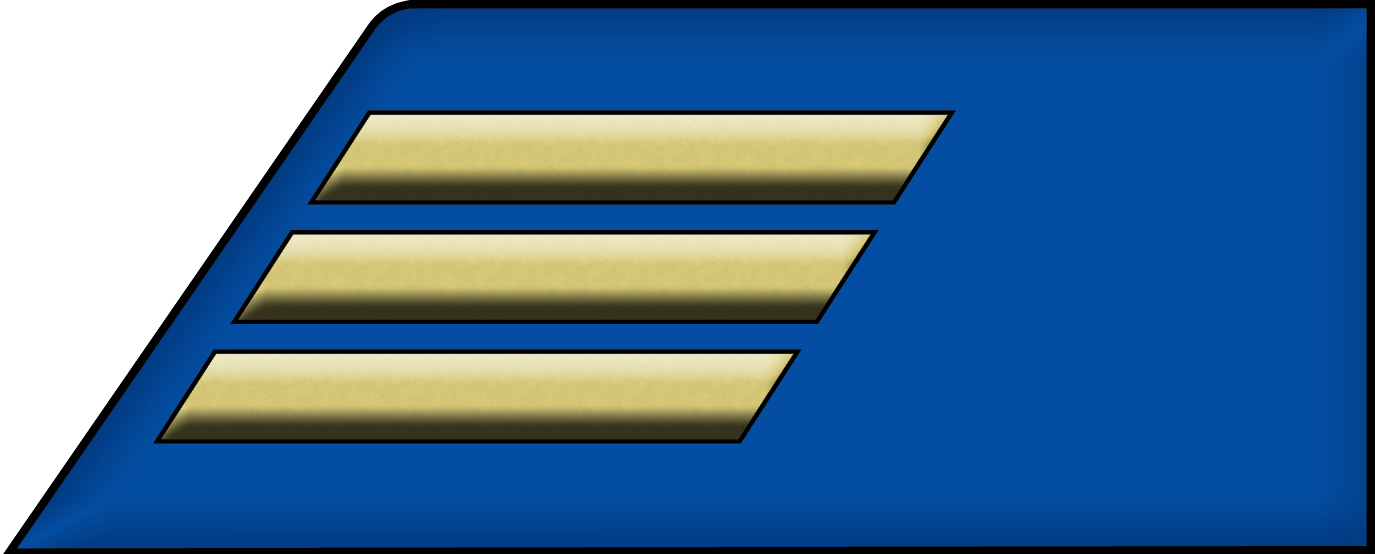
Captain

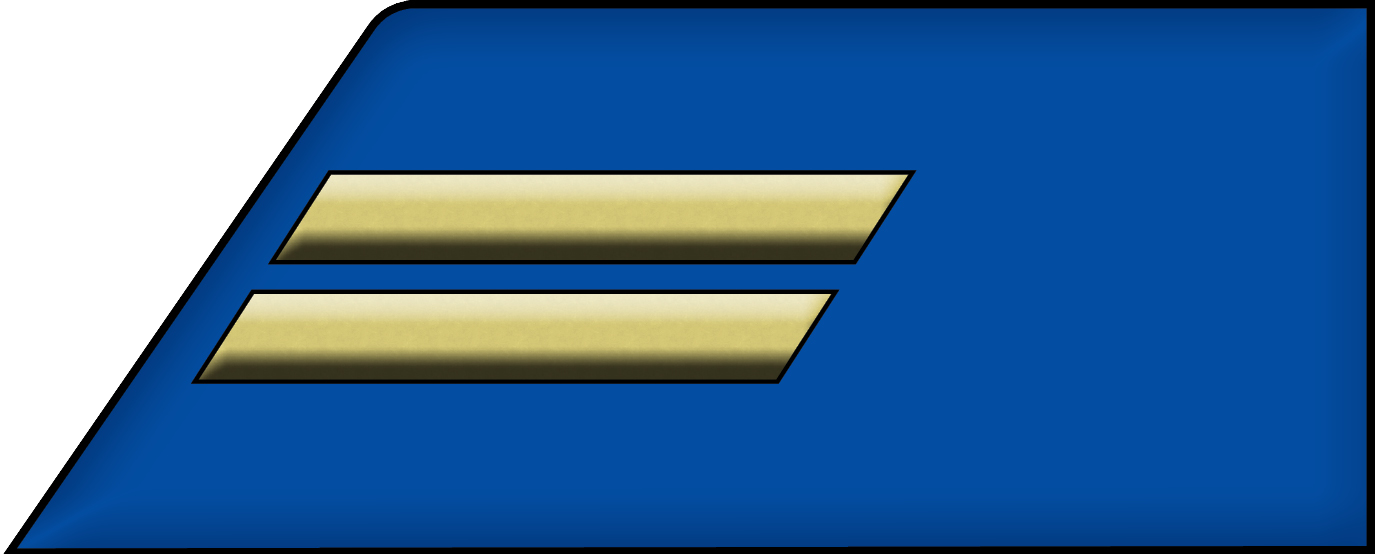
First lieutenant

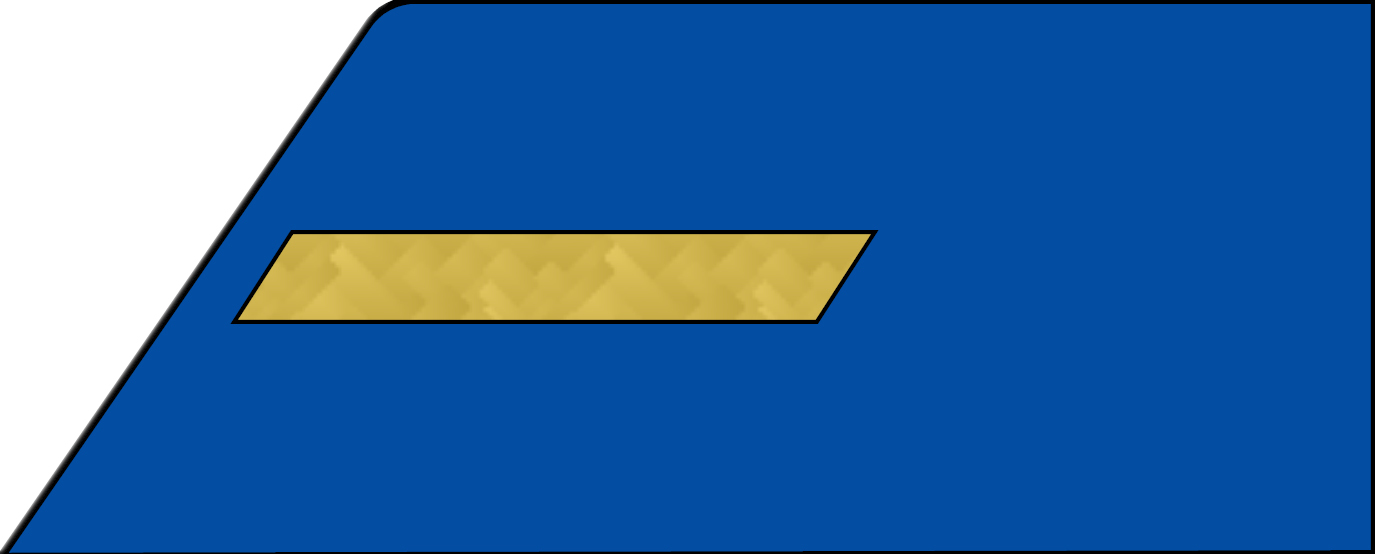
Second lieutenant

=== Non-commissioned officers ===
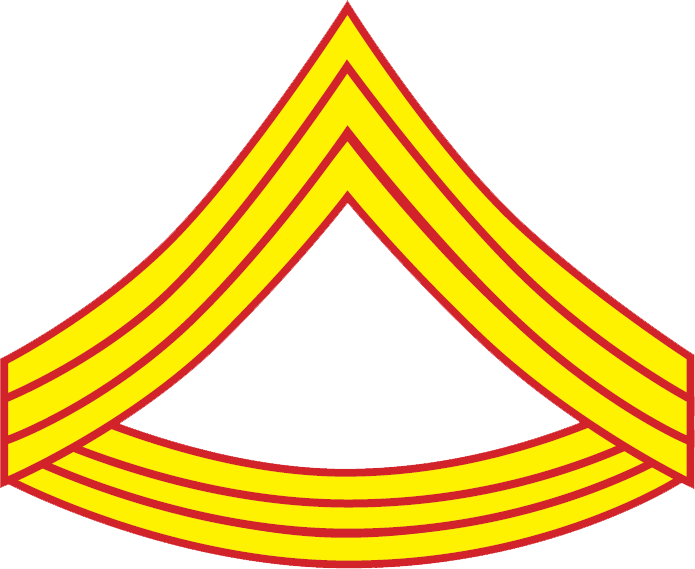
Sergeant Major

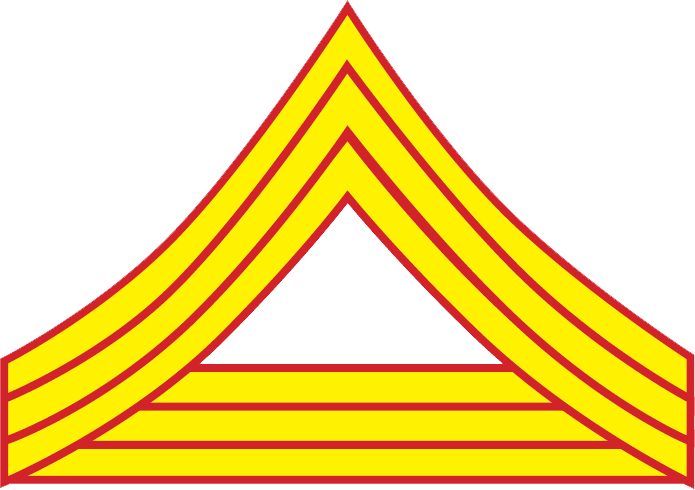
Quartermaster sergeant

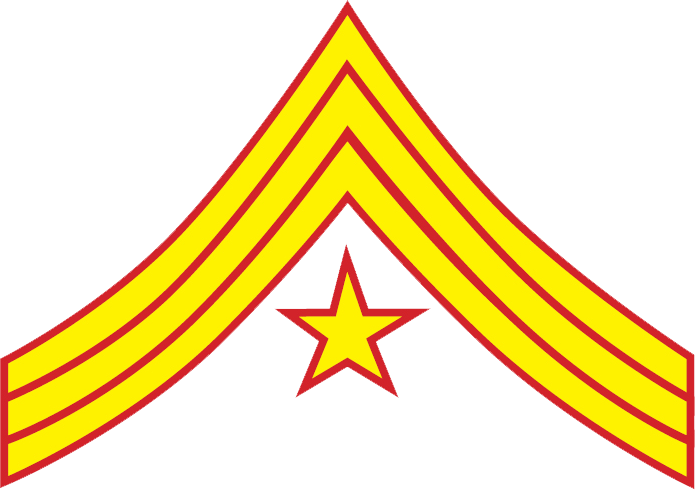
Ordnance sergeant

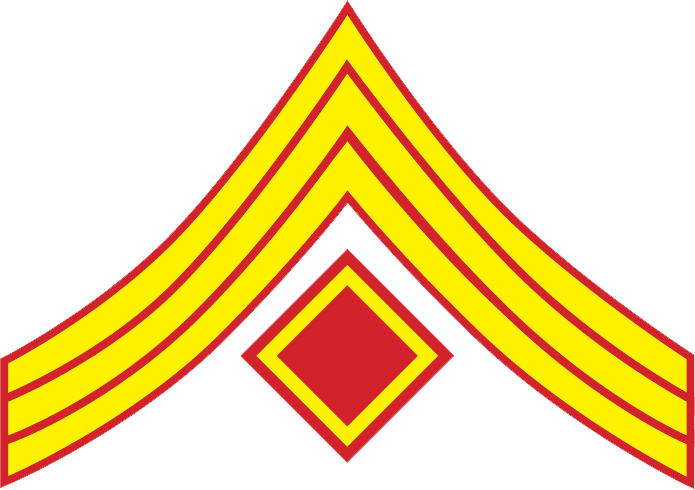
First sergeant

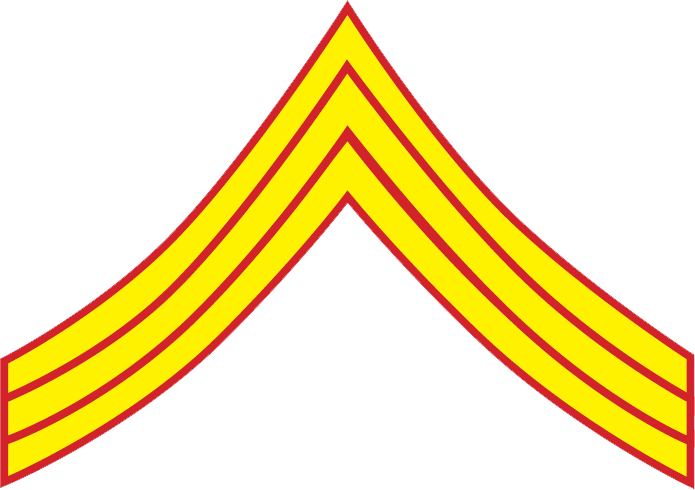
Sergeant

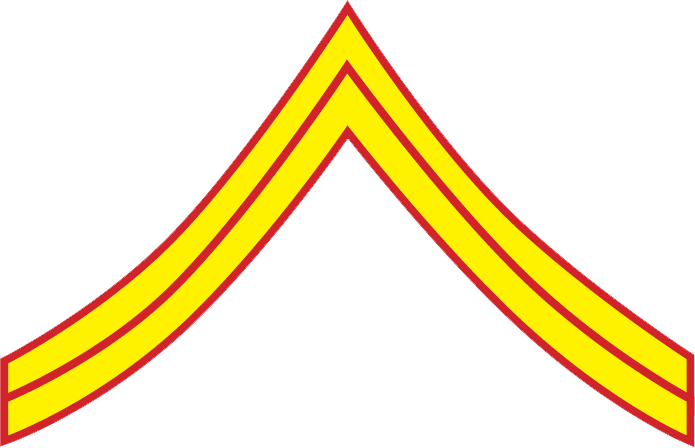
Corporal

== See also ==
- Military uniforms of the Confederate States
