= Harry Maury =

Confederate officer

Henry "Harry" Maury
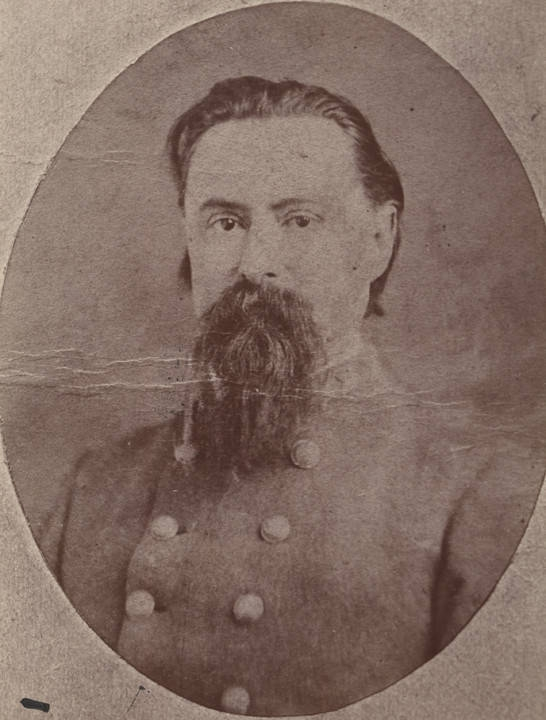
- Born: c. 1827; Virginia, US
- Died: 1869; Mobile, Alabama, US
- Military career
- Allegiance: Confederate States
- Branch: Confederate States Army
- Rank: Colonel
- Battles: American Civil War

Henry "Harry" Maury (c. 1827–1869) was an American filibuster who took part in military expeditions to Central America in the 1850s, and later was an officer in the Confederate States Army during the American Civil War. Initially enlisting to serve his adopted state of Alabama at the outbreak of the 1861 secession crisis, Maury rose to the rank of colonel and commanded the 15th Confederate Cavalry Regiment until the close of the war.

== Early life and filibustering ==
Harry Maury was born in Virginia, and was related to Confederate naval commander Matthew F. Maury and Confederate general Dabney H. Maury. He moved to Mobile, Alabama, as a young man, worked as a merchant seaman, and became a lawyer. Maury took part in local politics, and was elected the town marshal of Mobile in 1855.

In the 1850s, Maury took an interest in filibustering, which were attempts by Americans to raise private armies and launch invasions of Latin American countries. Maury recruited volunteers for an aborted expedition to Cuba in 1854 led by John A. Quitman, and also recruited for a failed mission to Nicaragua led by Henry Kinney. Maury then became connected with William Walker, who proclaimed himself the ruler of Nicaragua during the Filibuster War. Maury captained a ship in 1858 that evaded US revenue cutters in Mobile Bay to transport men to Walker's army in Central America, and Maury was arrested in October 1859 for violating US law in connection with Walker's filibustering expeditions.

== Civil war ==
At the outbreak of the secession crisis that led to the American Civil War, Maury volunteered to join Alabama's armed forces, and he was placed in command of the Alabama troops assembled at Fort Morgan on Mobile Bay. These volunteers were organized as the 2nd Alabama Infantry in the spring of 1861, and Maury became the colonel of the regiment. When the 2nd Alabama's one-year term of service expired in 1862, the regiment was disbanded and Maury joined the 32nd Alabama Infantry Regiment as a lieutenant colonel. He fought in Tennessee at the Battle of Stones River, and was seriously wounded in the July 1863 Jackson expedition in Mississippi.

In early 1864, Maury was promoted to colonel and given command of a new regiment, the 15th Confederate Cavalry, made up of Florida and Alabama companies. He was then dispatched to Jones County, Mississippi to investigate the anti-Confederate rebellion there led by Newton Knight. On March 5, 1864, the cavalry fought a battle with Knight's company of insurgents, and hung several local men as deserters from the Confederate Army. Colonel Maury believed he had put a stop to the rebellion, but Knight's defiance of Confederate authority continued after his troops left the region.

For the remainder of the war, Maury's 15th Confederate Cavalry was assigned to defensive duty in the Florida panhandle and Mobile Bay, skirmishing with Federal troops in small-scale engagements. The regiment surrendered at the end of the war in April 1865, and he returned to civilian life in Mobile, where he died in February, 1869.
