= Brush Battalion =

The Brush Battalion was an irregular Confederate military unit raised in Texas during the U.S. Civil War. The battalion was formed with men who had "taken to the brush" to avoid conscription for military service. Some had served in militia units being pressed for regular service, others had deserted regular service or opposed the Confederate cause and forced military service in its support. Officially organized on November 6, 1863, the Battalion was primarily employed to defend the Texas frontier against Comanche and Kiowa raids.

== See also ==
- Confederate Government Civil War units
