= Benjamin Lloyd Beall =

US Army officer (1801–1863)

Benjamin Lloyd Beall (1801–1863) was a U.S. Army officer who served in the U.S. Cavalry, in the antebellum Indian Wars, Mexican–American War, and American Civil War.

He is also known by the moniker "Old Ben".

== Early life ==
Benjamin Lloyd Beall was born 1 Oct 1801 in Washington D.C. His father was Brevet Major Lloyd Beall (born 9 Aug 1751 in Maryland) of the United States Army, cousin of George Beall, and descendant of Ninian Beall (1625-1717),immigrant to Maryland from Scotland. Lloyd Beall, was wounded at Germantown during the American Revolution, served as mayor of Georgetown, D.C. from 1797 to 1799, and in 1814 during the War of 1812 was a Major of Artillery stationed at Fort McHenry near Baltimore. His mother was Elizabeth Waugh Jones, born 14 May 1764 in Baltimore, Maryland. One of his brothers was Lloyd James Beall, who served as the Commandant of the Confederate States Marine Corps from May 23, 1861, to April 9, 1865.

On March 25, 1814, at age thirteen years and five months, Ben was admitted to West Point. In June 1818, Cadet Benjamin Beall was ranked 16th out of 19 cadets in his section. Despite having spent four years at the military academy, he was placed in the third (sophomore) class. For this reason he decided to drop out of West Point, but in later years he continued with his military career. In 1818, with the aid of some influential friends of his late father, Beall secured a clerkship with the War Department, where he would remain for the next 18 years.

Beall would recount how he arrived at the Military Academy a brash youth, fully "equipped with a pointer and a liquor flask." Beall described his new cadet uniform as consisting of an "embroidered coat, tights, high top boots with tassels, cocked hat & sword" and mentioned how he almost got into a fist-fight in New York with a street urchin who had taunted him by "singing out 'there goes a middy on half pay.'" (Staff Records, (Proceedings of the Academic Board) U.S. Military Academy for June 1818, U.S. Military Academy Cadet Application Papers, 1805–1866 and Orders of the Adjutant for 16 October 1818, U.S. Military Academy, NARA RG 688. See also George Stammerjohan and Will Gorenfeld, '”Dropped from the Rolls: The West Point Years of Benjamin Beall: 1814–1818”, Military Collector & Historian, Spring 2002, vol. 54, no. 1, 16.)

On June 13, 1825 Beall married Elizabeth Taylor, daughter of George Taylor and Mary Ann (LNU). She was born in Virginia in 1802. They would become the parents of five sons and two daughters.

== Seminole War ==
Beall was elected captain of the Washington City Volunteers for service in the Seminole War on June 1, 1836, and entered the army from civil life on the June 8, 1836, as Captain in the Second Dragoons. Shortly afterward the U.S. 2nd Dragoon Regiment, was formed to fight the Seminole Indians, with Company I, under Captain Benjamin L. Beall, who entered the army from civil life on June 8, 1836.

Associated with its first Colonel Twiggs were some subordinate officers who also did much to encourage this spirit in the regiment. Among these none were more prominent than Captain Beall, familiarly known to the army as "Old Ben Beall," of whom at the close of the Florida War General Worth officially reported that he "has met the enemy in this contest, oftener, perhaps, than any other officer" and "is brave and generous." The foe overcome, the tedious trail retraced, horses and men cared for, and where was the man who made social history more racy or gave entertainment more varied than "Old Ben"? Captain Beall was brevetted major on March 15, 1837, "for gallantry and successful service" against the Florida Indians.

== Western service and Mexican War ==
In Baton Rouge, La., on Thursday evening, November 17, 1842 Lieutenant Theodoric Henry Porter, U.S. Infantry, (son of Commodore Porter), was married to Elizabeth Lloyd Beall, daughter of the Captain Benjamin Lloyd Beall, while he was stationed at Fort Washita on the Red River. In April 1846 Beall was stationed in San Antonio, where he was ordered to escort German immigrants to Fredericksburg and the Pedernales River. During the Mexican–American War, Beall was promoted from captain of the Second Dragoons to major of the U.S. 1st Dragoon Regiment on February 16, 1847. On March 16, 1848, received a second brevet, to lieutenant colonel, for his part in the Battle of Santa Cruz de Rosales.(Will Gorenfeld, “The Cowpens Slaughter: Was There a Massacre of Mexican Troops at the Battle of Santa Cruz de Rosales?” 81 New Mexico Historical Review, 413 (Fall 2006).)

After the Mexican War Beall was stationed in New Mexico Territory until February 1848, in command of the district of New Mexico. He made one or two trips into the field with Kit Carson as his guide, in ineffectual pursuits of marauding Apaches. In February 1848, he took the First Dragoons to El Paso and established Fort Bliss, remaining at the new post for only a few months; he was not responsible for any of its construction.

== Western Service and Civil War ==
Beall served for several more years on the western frontier. He was promoted lieutenant colonel of the First Dragoons Regiment on March 3, 1855. The Department of California was commanded by Lt. Colonel Benjamin L. Beall, who had assumed command, by seniority of rank, on the death of General Newman S. Clarke, on October 17, 1860.

At the beginning of the Civil War, Colonel Thomas T. Fauntleroy resigned as colonel of the First Dragoons Regiment on May 13, 1861, and was succeeded by Beall, who was promoted to colonel on May 3, 1861. On August 3, 1861, the designation of the First Dragoons Regiment was changed to "First Regiment of Cavalry". From September 13, 1861, to October 23, 1861, Colonel Benjamin L. Beall, commanded the District of Oregon, replacing George Wright as its commander.

During November and December 1861, the First Regiment of Cavalry, except Companies D and G which were still stationed in New Mexico Territory, was transferred by steamship from the Pacific Coast through Panama and then to Washington, D.C., arriving by the end of January 1862. Colonel Beall was retired February 1, 1862, and was succeeded by Colonel George A.H. Blake, as commander of the Regiment. Colonel Beall retired from active duty on February 15, 1862, and died in Maryland on August 16, 1863.
