= List of Confederate Government units in the American Civil War =

Battle flag of the Confederate States (1861–1865)

During the American Civil War, the Confederate States Congress authorized the creation of a national army, to consist of 6 infantry regiments, 1 cavalry regiment, a corps of artillery, a corps of engineers, and staff departments. However, this army never came into being, and instead the volunteer units of the Provisional Army of the Confederate States were organized at the state level. Several Provisional Army organizations consisting of units from multiple states were given "Confederate" regimental designations.

== Infantry ==
- 1st Confederate Infantry (formerly 36th Georgia)
- 2nd Confederate Infantry (formerly 1st Mississippi Valley and 25th Mississippi, later 1st Battalion, Mississippi Sharpshooters)
- 3rd Confederate Infantry
- 4th Confederate Infantry (also 1st Alabama, Tennessee, and Mississippi, later 54th Alabama)
- 5th Confederate Infantry (formerly Walker's 40th Tennessee)
- 9th Confederate Infantry (Smith's, also 5th Confederate Infantry)
- Tucker's Confederate Regiment (also 1st Foreign Battalion, 1st Foreign Legion: former Union prisoners of war)
- 1st Battalion, Confederate Infantry (Forney's)
- 2nd Battalion, Confederate Infantry (Malone's)
- 3rd Battalion, Confederate Infantry (Yesler's)
- 4th Battalion, Confederate Infantry (Clack's)
- 8th Battalion, Confederate Infantry (also 2nd Foreign Battalion, 2nd Foreign Legion: former Union POWs)
- Gillum's Confederate Mounted Infantry
- Brooks' Battalion, Confederate Infantry (also Brooks Foreign Battalion, former Union POWs)
- Brush Battalion

== Cavalry ==
- 1st Confederate Cavalry
- 1st Confederate Regular Cavalry
- 2nd Confederate Cavalry (formerly 11th Alabama Battalion)
- 3rd Confederate Cavalry
- 7th Confederate Cavalry (Claiborne's, later split to form 10th Georgia and 16th North Carolina Battalion)
- 8th Confederate Cavalry (Wade's, also known as 2nd Mississippi and Alabama Cavalry)
- 8th Confederate Cavalry (Dearing's)
- 10th Confederate Cavalry (Goode's, formerly 5th Battalion Alabama, Hilliard's Legion, and 19th Battalion Georgia)
- 14th Confederate Cavalry (Dumonteil's)
- 15th Confederate Cavalry (also 1st Alabama and Florida)
- 16th Confederate Cavalry (12th Mississippi, Armistead's, Spence's)
- 20th Confederate Cavalry (Lay's)
- Wirt Adams' Confederate Cavalry (also Wood's)
- Harman's Confederate Cavalry
- Mead's Confederate Cavalry
- Powers' Confederate Cavalry
- 1st Battalion, Trans-Mississippi Confederate Cavalry (1st Battalion, Arkansas and Louisiana)
- 6th Battalion, Confederate Cavalry (Kentucky Mounted Rangers)
- 7th Battalion, Confederate Cavalry (Prentice's)
- Baxter's Battalion
- Burrough's Battalion
- Clarkson's Battalion
- Murchison's Battalion
- Captain Raum's Company (Warren Dragoons)

== Indian cavalry ==
- 1st Cherokee Mounted Rifles (1st Arkansas Cherokee Mounted Rifles)
- 1st Cherokee Mounted Volunteers (Watie's Regiment, Cherokee Mounted Volunteers; 2nd Regiment, Cherokee Mounted Rifles, Arkansas; 1st Regiment, Cherokee Mounted Rifles or Riflemen)
- Cherokee Regiment (Special Service)
- 1st Squadron, Cherokee Mounted Volunteers (Holt's Squadron, Cherokee Mounted Volunteers)
- 2nd Cherokee Mounted Volunteers (2nd Regiment Cherokee Mounted Rifles or Riflemen)
- 1st Chickasaw Infantry (Hunter's Regiment, Indian Volunteers)
- Shecoe's Chickasaw Battalion, Mounted Volunteers
- 1st Choctaw and Chickasaw Mounted Rifles
- 1st Choctaw Mounted Rifles
- Deneale's Regiment, Choctaw Warriors (Deneale's Confederate Volunteers)
- Wilkins' (Captain) Company, Choctaw Infantry
- 1st Creek Mounted Volunteers (1st Regiment, Creek Mounted Rifles or Riflemen; Creek Regiment, Mounted Indian Volunteers; 2nd Regiment, Arkansas Creeks)
- 2nd Creek Mounted Volunteers
- 1st Osage Battalion, C.S.A.
- 1st Seminole Mounted Volunteers
- Washington's Squadron of Indians, C.S.A. (Reserve Squadron of Cavalry)

== Artillery ==
- Braxton's Battalion, Confederate Artillery (Battalion C, 2d Corps, Army of Northern Virginia)
- Cunningham's Battalion, Confederate Artillery
- Courtney's Battalion, Confederate Artillery
- Haskell's Battalion, Confederate Artillery
- Huger's Battalion, Confederate Artillery
- Lewis' Battalion, Confederate Artillery
- Martin's Battalion, Confederate Reserve Artillery
- McLaughlin's Battalion, Confederate Artillery
- McIntosh's Battalion, Confederate Artillery (Battalion C,
- Nelson's Battalion, Confederate Artillery (31st Battalion, Virginia Light Artillery; 3rd Battalion Reserve, Light Artillery)
- Page's Battalion, Confederate Artillery (Carter's Battalion of Artillery; Braxton's Battalion of Artillery)
- Palmer's Battalion, Confederate Artillery (Robertson's Battalion of Artillery)
- Poague's Battalion, Artillery

=== Light Artillery ===
- 1st Regular Battery, Confederate Light Artillery (Semmes' Battery; Barnes' Battery)
- Davis' Company, Confederate Light Artillery
- Dent's Battery, Confederate Light Artillery
- Richardson's Battalion, Confederate Light Artillery (Battalion A. 1st Corps Artillery, Army of Northern Virginia)
- Stark's Battalion, Confederate Light Artillery (Battalion B. 1st Corps Artillery, Army of Northern Virginia)
- Cobb's Battery 1st Kentucky Light Artillery (1st Kentucky Orphans Brigade, Army of Tennessee)

=== Heavy Artillery ===
- De Gournay's Battalion, Heavy Artillery (12th Battalion, Louisiana Heavy Artillery)
- Montague's Battalion, Confederate Heavy Artillery (4th Battalion, Confederate Heavy Artillery)
- Smith's Battalion, Confederate Heavy Artillery

=== Horse Artillery ===
- Marshall's Company, Confederate Artillery (Brown Horse Artillery)
- Stuart's Horse Artillery
- White's (Captain) Battery, Horse Artillery

== Engineers ==
- 1st Regiment, Confederate Engineer Troops
- 2nd Regiment, Confederate Engineer Troops
- 3rd Regiment, Confederate Engineer Troops
- 4th Regiment, Confederate Engineer Troops
- 1st Battalion, Confederate Engineer Troops

== Miscellaneous organizations ==
- Bands, C.S.A.
- Bell's Battalion, C.S.A.
- Burrough's Battalion, Partisan Rangers (Princess Anne Partisan Rangers)
- Click's Company, Ordnance Scouts and Guards, C.S.A.
- Confederate Infantry
- Cunningham's Ordnance Detachment (Cuyler's Ordnance Detachment)
- Davis' Company of Guides, C.S.A.
- Exchanged Battalion, C.S.A. (Trans-Mississippi Battalion; Western Battalion)
- Infantry School of Practice
- Invalid Corps
- Jackson's Company, C.S.A.
- Lyon's Escort, Forrest's Cavalry, C.S.A.
- Madison's Company, Mounted Spies and Guides (Phillips' Mtd. Spies and Guides)
- Martin's Escort, C.S.A.
- McDaniel's (Captain) Company, Secret Service
- Miscellaneous Indian Records
- Nitre and Mining Bureau, War Department, C.S.A.,
- Ochiltree's Detachment of Recruits (Detachment of Regulars)
- President's Guard, C.S.A.
- Reserve Corps Artillery, Army of Northern Virginia)
- Sappers and Miners
- Signal Corps, C.S.A.
- Stirman's Regiment, Sharp Shooters
- Young's (5th) Company, Retributors

=== Scouts ===
- Blake's Scouts, C.S.A.
- Bradford's Corps, Scouts and Guards (Bradford's Battalion)
- Forrest's Scouts, C.S.A.
- Fort's Scouts, C.S.A.
- Lillard's Company, Independent Scouts and Rangers (Nelson Rangers and Scouts)
- Wheeler's Scouts, C.S.A. (Hawkins' Scouts, C.S.A.; Carter's Scouts, C.S.A.; 1st Tennessee Mounted Scouts)

== See also ==
- List of American Civil War units by state
