= 1st Confederate Infantry Battalion =

- Active: 1861–1865
- Disbanded: April 9, 1865
- Country: Confederate States
- Branch: Confederate States Army
- Type: Infantry
- Size: Battalion
- Battles: American Civil War: Second Battle of Corinth; Battle of Grand Gulf; Battle of Champion Hill; Battle of the Wilderness; Battle of Cold Harbor; Petersburg Campaign; Appomattox Campaign

The 1st Confederate Infantry Battalion was a unit of the Confederate States Army during the American Civil War. Originally formed as the 2nd Alabama Infantry Regiment, it was reorganized in May 1862 with troops from other Southern states to form a Confederate infantry battalion, after which it took part in many battles in both the Western and Eastern theaters. The 1st Confederate Battalion was captured and surrendered in Virginia during the final stages of the war in April, 1865

== History ==
The nucleus of the 1st Confederate Battalion was the 2nd Alabama Infantry Regiment, which was formed at Mobile in April 1861 for one year's service. The 2nd Alabama was assigned to guard Fort Morgan in Mobile Bay under the command of Colonel Harry Maury. This fort at the mouth of Mobile Bay was strategically important to protect shipping to and from Mobile and to counter any attempted Union naval attack. In the spring of 1862, the 2nd Alabama was sent to Fort Pillow, Tennessee, and the regiment was disbanded there when its original 1-year term of service expired. Three remaining companies from the 2nd Alabama re-enlisted in the summer of 1862 along with soldiers from Florida, Georgia, and Tennessee, forming the 1st Confederate Battalion under command of Major George H. Forney, the brother of Confederate General John Horace Forney. The "Confederate" designation was meant to indicate that the battalion contained companies from multiple states and was intended for national Confederate States Army service, although the vast majority of Confederate units carried state designations. For a short period the unit was called the First Confederate Infantry Regiment when five additional Missouri companies were added to the ranks on July 10, 1862, upgrading the unit to full regimental strength, but these companies were detached on August 25 and later joined the 6th Missouri, so the 1st Confederate returned to battalion size. An unrelated unit from Georgia held the designation of 1st Confederate Regiment for most of the war.

The 1st Battalion remained at Fort Pillow until ordered to North Mississippi, and then took part Second Battle of Corinth in the fall of 1862 as part of General John Bordenave Villepigue's brigade. Following the Confederate defeat at Corinth, the 1st Battalion was reassigned to General Lloyd Tilghman's brigade and sent to Vicksburg, Mississippi to defend the city against a Union advance. In the Vicksburg Campaign the Battalion fought at the Battle of Grand Gulf and Battle of Champion Hill outside the city's defensive lines, and the Battalion was not captured when the city fell to the Union on July 4, 1863.

In March 1864, the Battalion was transferred to General Joseph R. Davis's brigade in the Army of Northern Virginia and sent to fight in the Eastern Theater. At this stage of the war, Union general Ulysses S. Grant was pushing his forces towards the Confederate capital of Richmond in the Overland Campaign. The 1st Battalion fought at the Battle of the Wilderness, where commanding officer Colonel Forney was killed, the Battle of Cold Harbor, and the Siege of Petersburg, and the Battle of Hatcher's Run. During the final stages of the Appomattox campaign, the Battalion was captured by Union forces a few days before the rest of the Army of Northern Virginia surrendered.

Another unrelated unit, also using the designation "1st Confederate Battalion", was formed by consolidating several depleted Georgia regiments in 1865 during the closing days of the war, but this Georgia unit only existed for a few weeks before the surrender.

== See also ==
- List of Confederate Government units in the American Civil War
