= Lloyd J. Beall =

Commandant of the Confederate States Marine Corps

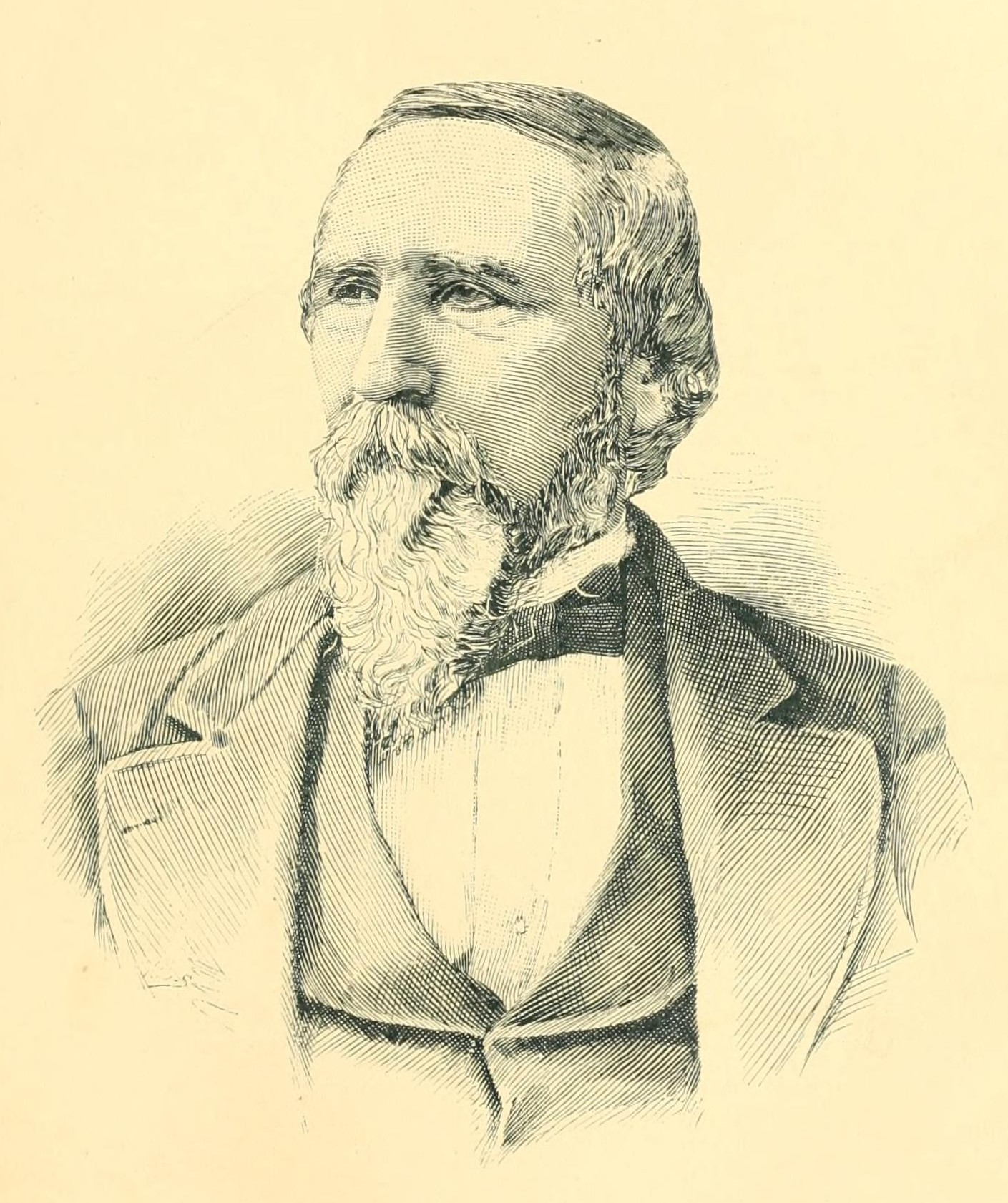
- Born: October 19, 1808; Fort Adams, Rhode Island
- Died: November 10, 1887 (aged 79); Richmond, Virginia
- Military career
- Allegiance: United States; Confederate States
- Service: United States Army; Confederate States Marine Corps
- Service years: 1830–1861 (U.S.); 1861–1865 (C.S.)
- Rank: Major (U.S.); Colonel (C.S.)
- Commands: Commandant of the Confederate States Marine Corps
- Wars: Black Hawk War; Seminole Wars; Mexican–American War; American Civil War

Lloyd James Beall (October 19, 1808 – November 10, 1887) was a Confederate military officer who served with the Confederate States Marine Corps. He attained the rank of colonel and served as the Commandant of the Confederate States Marine Corps from May 23, 1861, to April 9, 1865.

== Early life and career ==
Lloyd James Beall was born at Fort Adams, Rhode Island, the son of Brevet Major Lloyd Beall of the United States Army, cousin of George Beall, and descendant of Ninian Beall (1625-1717), immigrant to Maryland from Scotland. His father, Lloyd Beall, was wounded at Germantown during the Revolution, served as mayor of Georgetown, D.C., from 1797 to 1799, and in 1814 during the War of 1812 was a Major of Artillery stationed at Fort McHenry near Baltimore. Lloyd James Beall's mother was Elizabeth Waugh Jones, daughter of Hon. Thomas Jones of Patapsco Neck, Judge of the Maryland Court of Appeals (1778–1806). His two brothers, Benjamin Lloyd Beall and John were to become officers and remain in the U.S. Army during the Civil War. He was a distant cousin of John Yates Beall, Confederate privateer and spy, executed during the Civil War.

Beall graduated from the United States Military Academy at West Point, New York, in 1830. He also attended the Saumur Cavalry School in France, from 1840 to 1842 to learn the French Army's system of Dragoon exercise. In 1844, Beall was promoted to major in the U.S. Army. He served in the Black Hawk and Seminole Wars, as well as in the Mexican–American War. He was a U.S. Army paymaster stationed at St. Louis, Missouri, when the Civil War began.

A summary of Beall's U.S. Army career follows: Cadet at the Military Academy, July 1, 1826, to July 1, 1830, when he was graduated and promoted in the Army to Bvt. Second Lieut., 1st Infantry, July 1, 1830; Second Lieut., 1st Infantry, July 1, 1830, Served on frontier duty, at Ft. Winnebago, Wisconsin, 1831, and Ft. Armstrong, Illinois, 1831–32; in the Black Hawk War against the Sac Indians, 1832; on frontier duty at Ft. Crawford, Wisconsin, 1832–33; as Adjutant, 1st Infantry, at Regimental Headquarters, March 1, 1833, to June 11, 1836; became First Lieutenant, 2nd Dragoons, June 11, 1836; Captain, 2nd Dragoons, October 19, 1836, to September 13, 1844; at Headquarters of 2nd Dragoons on Regimental Staff duty, 1836–37; in garrison at Jefferson Barracks, Missouri, 1837; in the Second Seminole War, also known as the Florida War, against the Miccosukee Seminole Indians, 1837–38, being engaged in the action of Locha-Hatchee, Florida, Jan. 24, 1838, and the Skirmish of Kenapapa Prairie, June 17, 1838, while transferring Indians to the West during the "Trail of Tears"; in the Cherokee Nation, Oklahoma 1838–39. Recruiting service, 1839–40; at the Cavalry School at Saumur, France, 1840–1842, to learn the French system of Dragoon exercise; at United States Army Cavalry School, Carlisle Barracks, Pennsylvania, 1842; on frontier duty at Fort Jesup, Louisiana, 1842–43; on detached service at Washington, D.C., 1843–44; as Member of the Board of Visitors to the U.S. Military Academy, 1843; and again, on frontier duty at Fort Jesup, Louisiana, 1844; Major, Staff and became Paymaster, U.S. Army, Sep. 13, 1844; in the Army Pay Department, 1844–1861, in the Military Occupation of Texas, 1845–1846; in the Mexican–American War, 1846–47; in Cincinnati, Ohio, 1847–48; New Orleans, Louisiana, 1848; Washington, D.C. 1848–49; Albany, New York, 1849–1854; San Antonio, Texas, 1854–1859, and St. Louis, Missouri, 1859–1861. Resigned from United States Army, April 22, 1861, and joined the Confederate States Army in the rebellion of 1861–1865 against the United States.

== American Civil War ==
Siding with the Confederate States of America, Beall tendered his resignation and headed south. Beall was appointed a colonel in the Provisional Army of the Confederate States. On May 23, 1861, the Secretary of the Confederate States Navy, Stephen Mallory, appointed Beall as Colonel Commandant of the Marine Corps, the only person to hold that position, and Beall served in that capacity throughout the war.

As an administrator during the war, Beall's military knowledge and experience remained an untapped resource. He worked hard to have the Confederate Marine Corps receive the personnel, supplies and other benefits accorded to other branches of the military. The training of officers and enlisted Marines took place at the Marines' Barrack's Camp Beall, just a short distance south of Richmond, Virginia, at Drewry's Bluff overlooking the James River. By the end of the war, he had succeeded in helping improve the resources available to the Marine Corps and established a separate Marine training camp in Charleston, South Carolina; several permanent stations on the Mississippi River and Atlantic Seaboard.

Thanks, in part, to Beall's efforts, the Confederate Marines, called the "Rebel Leathernecks", gained a reputation for distinguished combat service, on the sea and land.

== Later life ==
Beall married Frances Duncan Hayne, daughter of South Carolina Senator Arthur Peronneau Hayne, and Frances Gibson Duncan, daughter of Hon. Thomas Duncan of Carlisle, Pennsylvania, justice of the Supreme Court of Pennsylvania (1817–1827). Their children were Arthur Hayne Beall and Elizabeth Alston Beall (wife of William Mitchell of Richmond VA).

After the Civil War, Beall lived in Richmond, Virginia, and became a merchant, Alderman of the city of Richmond and Superintendent of the Westmoreland Club. Beall kept most of the Confederate States Marine Corps records at his home. Much of the CSMC history, along with Beall's personal history during the war, was destroyed in a fire at his Richmond home in 1887.

Beall died in Richmond on November 10, 1887, at age 79. He is interred in the city's Hollywood Cemetery.

Military offices
New office	Commandant of the Confederate States Marine Corps; 1861–1865	Office abolished
