= Confederate States Marine Corps =

- Flag of the Confederate States Marine Corps
- Active: 1861–1865
- Disbanded: May 9, 1865
- Country: Confederate States
- Branch: Confederate States Navy
- Type: Maritime land force
- Role: Amphibious warfare; Expeditionary warfare
- Size: 900–1,000
- Part of: Department of the Navy
- Headquarters: 115 Main Street, Richmond, Virginia, C.S.
- Engagements: American Civil War

Commanders
- Commander in Chief: Jefferson Davis
- Secretary of the Navy: Stephen R. Mallory
- Colonel-Commandant: Col. Lloyd J. Beall
- Sergeant Major of the Confederate Marine Corps: SMCMC Edwin Wallace (former British Royal Marine; Promoted to SMCMC on 1 February, 1864; demoted to private 1 July, 1864; deserted 30 July, 1864)

The Confederate States Marine Corps (CSMC), also referred to as the Confederate States Marines, was a branch of the Confederate Navy during the American Civil War. It was established by an act of the Provisional Congress of the Confederate States on March 16, 1861. The CSMC's manpower was initially authorized at 46 officers and 944 enlisted men, and was increased on September 24, 1862, to 1,026 enlisted men. The organization of the CSMC began at Montgomery, Alabama, and was completed at Richmond, Virginia, when the capital of the Confederate States was moved to that location. The headquarters and main training facilities remained in Richmond throughout the war, located at Camp Beall on Drewry's Bluff and at the Gosport Shipyard in Portsmouth, Virginia. The last CSMC unit surrendered with 28 men to the Union army on April 9, 1865, with the Confederacy itself capitulating a month later.

== Modeled after USMC ==
Before the war, the United States Marine Corps had been an "exceptionally fine and well-disciplined" organization, and "from it came the nucleus of the corresponding establishment of the Confederate service", the CSMC. The CSMC was modeled after the United States Marine Corps, but there were some differences: the Confederates organized themselves into permanent companies, replaced the fife with the light infantry bugle, and wore uniforms similar to those of British Royal Marines. Like the USMC, when ashore they provided guard detachments for Confederate naval stations at:

- Richmond, Virginia
- Camp Beall, located near Fort Darling at Drewry's Bluff, Virginia
- Wilmington, North Carolina – Fort Fisher
- Charlotte, North Carolina
- Charleston, South Carolina
- Hilton Head Island, South Carolina
- Savannah, Georgia
- Pensacola, Florida – (manned naval shore batteries)
- Mobile, Alabama

Seagoing detachments served aboard the various warships and even on commerce destroyers.

== Organization ==
The C.S. Marine Corps was formed in the early days of the Civil War from three sources:

- Sixteen officers (resigning or deserting from the U.S. Marine Corps)
- 100 enlisted men
- The amalgamation of state organizations such as the Virginia State Marines
- Active recruitment

=== Source of men ===
Rank insignia of a CSMC captain

The Colonel-Commandant of the CSMC, Lloyd J. Beall, said the CSMC "was composed of enlisted men, many of whom were old soldiers and commissioned officers, a number of whom had seen service before in the U.S. Marine Corps and elsewhere." The record of US Marine officers who "resigned and tendered their swords to the Confederate Government" were:

US Marine Officers who resigned
Name	State
Major Henry B. Tyler (USMC Adjutant)	Virginia
Brevet Major George H. Terret	Virginia
Captain Robert Tansill	Virginia
Captain Algernon S. Taylor	Virginia
Captain John D. Simms	Virginia
First Lieutenant Israel Greene	Virginia
First Lieutenant John K. H. Tatnall	Georgia
First Lieutenant Julius E. Meire	Maryland
First Lieutenant George P. Turner	Virginia
First Lieutenant Thomas S. Wilson	Missouri
First Lieutenant Andrew J. Hays	Alabama
First Lieutenant Adam N. Baker	Pennsylvania
Second Lieutenant George Holmes	Florida
Second Lieutenant Calvin L. Sayre	Alabama
Second Lieutenant Henry L. Ingraham	South Carolina
Second Lieutenant Beckett K. Howell	Mississippi

These officers assembled with the CSMC as it stood up in Richmond, Virginia, with the exception of Captain Tansill, who had resigned while still on board USS Congress at sea. Captain Tansill was arrested by order of Secretary Welles of the U.S. Navy when he arrived in New York on August 23, 1861, and was held without charge, hearing or trial. He was released on January 10, 1862, as part of a prisoner exchange, and subsequently joined the CSMC in Virginia. "The gross injustice done him was recognized in an act of the Confederate Congress of April 11, 1863, which provided that 'officers of the navy and Marine Corps who resigned from the navy and Marine Corps of the United States in consequence of secession, and who were arrested and imprisoned in consequence of such resignation, and who subsequently joined the navy and Marine Corps of the Confederate States,' should receive 'leave of absence, pay for and during the term of such imprisonment, and up to the time of their appointment in the navy and marine corps of the Confederate States.'"

=== Manpower composition ===
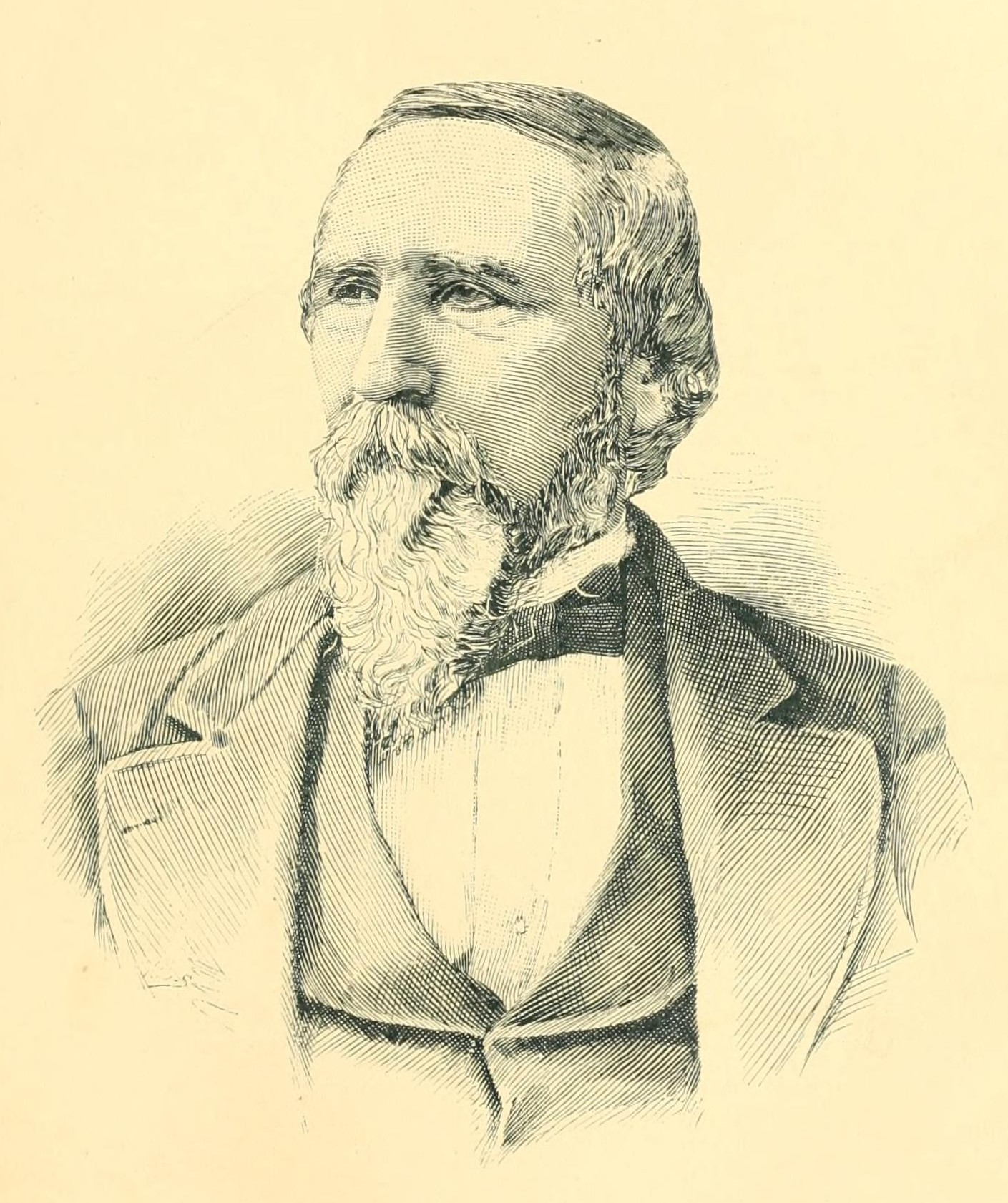
Lloyd J. Beall, first and only Colonel-Commandant

The breakdown of officer manpower composition was:

- One colonel-commandant
- One lieutenant colonel
- Three majors (a quartermaster, paymaster, and an adjutant)
- Ten captains
- Ten first lieutenants
- Twenty second lieutenants

The breakdown of enlisted manpower composition as of Sep 24, 1862 was:

- One sergeant major
- One quartermaster sergeant
- Sixty sergeants
- Sixty corporals
- 840 privates
- Thirty drummers
- Thirty fifers
- Two principal musicians and two musicians

Although the CSMC had an authorized manpower of 1,026 men, its enrollment never approached that number; the figures for October 30, 1864 list only 539 officers and enlisted men. Though the officers were mostly former U.S. Marine officers, the head of the corps, Colonel-Commandant Lloyd J. Beall, was a former U.S. Army paymaster with no Marine experience. Major Lloyd J. Beall, USA graduated from the United States Military Academy, and had served in the First Infantry and Second Dragoons before becoming a paymaster from 1844 until the outbreak of the war. He resigned his commission on April 22, 1861, and was appointed Colonel-Commandant of the CS Marine Corps on May 23, 1861. Colonel Beall served throughout the war as the only Commandant of the Marine Corps.

=== Unit organizations ===
The C.S. Marine Corps was organized into six lettered companies (A to F) and numerous shore-based and shipboard detachments. Companies A, B, and C were originally formed between April 10 and June 29, 1861, at New Orleans, LA. Company D, initially recruited in Memphis, Tennessee and Mobile, Alabama (August - September 1861) served in Pensacola, FL before being disbanded there and reformed at Mobile in November, 1861. Company E was formed at Savannah, Georgia in July 1862. There was also a Company F, initially formed at New Orleans in the spring of 1861, where it served for a brief period before being disbanded; it was later reformed at Mobile in April 1863 and disbanded for the second time in June 1864.

Companies A, B, and C were individually transferred from New Orleans to Pensacola from April through June 1861. Company A was subsequently transferred to Savannah in September 1862 before being transferred to Camp Beall, Virginia, to join Companies B and C, already there. Company B was briefly transferred to Mobile in February 1862 before being transferred to Camp Beall a few weeks later to join Company C, which had already been transferred there in November, 1861 to form the nucleus of what would become the organization (with the addition of Companies A and B) known as the "field battalion."

The battalion served in the defense of Richmond against riverine attack, provided ship's detachments to warships based in the Norfolk area, and participated in the general Confederate retreat from Richmond, performing notable combat action in the rear guard of General Lee's army as the Marine Battalion of Brigadier General (formerly Rear Admiral and commander of the Charleston Squadron, CSN) John R. Tucker's Naval Brigade at the Battle of Saylor's Creek (Virginia) on April 6, 1865. The majority of the battalion surrendered at Saylor's Creek on April 7, 1865, with most of the remainder surrendering with the Army of Northern Virginia on April 9, 1865, at Appomattox, Virginia.

Company D, initially stationed in Pensacola was disbanded in December, 1861 after being used to fill-out Companies B and C, also serving at that station. Company D was reformed at Mobile and served there, where it remained until that city fell to U.S. forces. Company D was the last organized unit of the CSMC to surrender; elements of the company surrendered on May 9, 1865, at Citronelle, Alabama and the remaining platoon, under the command of 1st Lieutenant David G. Raney Jr., surrendered at Nanna Hubba Bluff, Alabama on May 10, 1865.

Company E, initially formed in Savannah, subsequently evacuated to Charleston, South Carolina. A detachment of the company was sent to Wilmington, NC and participated in the unsuccessful defense of Fort Fisher. The remainder of Company E, still at Charleston, ultimately evacuated to North Carolina and joined with General Joseph E. Johnston's Army of Tennessee near Raleigh, North Carolina and surrendered with Brigadier General (formerly Rear Admiral and commander of the James River Squadron, CSN) Raphael Semmes's Naval Brigade at Greensboro, North Carolina on April 28, 1865.

Company F served originally at New Orleans as a "depot" company (i.e., recruiting and training unit) before being disbanded. It was later reformed at Mobile, again as a depot company, supplying Marines for Company D and the battalion at Camp Beall, eventually being disbanded for the final time in June 1864.

CS Marine Corps units were stationed at Confederate naval bases, as well as helping garrison shore fortifications such as Fort Fisher in North Carolina. Marines also served on Confederate warships. In the famous battle between the ironclads USS Monitor and CSS Virginia, Company C, Confederate States Marine Corps, served aboard CSS Virginia, helping to man several of her guns.

In the summer of 1862, some CS Marine Corps troops were organized into squad-sized units and dispersed throughout the south. Dispersed Marine units were intended to provide training to overcome a shortage of trained naval gunners, with greater overall effect than their service as a single naval artillery battalion. With detachments spread at every major Confederate naval installation, Headquarters for the Confederate States Marines was established at Fort Darling and Camp Beall, located at Drewry's Bluff on the James River in Virginia. As described above, three companies (A, B, and C) were stationed semi-permanently as the "field battalion" at CSMC headquarters. New CSMC officers were trained in the battalion prior to assignment to one of the detached companies (viz., D or E) or directly to one of the shore-based or shipboard Marine detachments. The "field battalion" Marines helped repulse the attack made on the bluff by U.S. naval forces including USS Monitor and USS Galena in the summer of 1862.

Despite desertions and even near-mutinies, most Marines served competently and deserved Navy Secretary Stephen R. Mallory's praise for their "promptness and efficiency." The corps' weakness and lack of contribution to the Confederate war effort was due largely to internal squabbles, a poorly managed chain of command, the demands of shore duty, and Marines being given administrative assignments rather than combat duties. Also, with no funds for bounties, the corps could not easily enlist recruits. Until 1864, the monthly pay of enlisted men was $3 less than that of equivalent army grades. Only late in the war were the Marines allowed to draw from army conscripts to augment their ranks.

== Service during the war ==
Confederate Marines saw their first naval action aboard CSS Virginia (formerly USS Merrimack) off Hampton Roads, Virginia, March 8 to 9, 1862, and near the end of the war were part of the naval brigade that fought at Sailor's Creek, Virginia.

From the Drewry's Bluff and other major posts (Wilmington, Charleston, Pensacola, Norfolk, Galveston, and Savannah), Marine detachments were parsed out to serve on major warships and for special operations, including the captures of USS Underwriter and USS Water Witch, and an attack to free Confederate prisoners of war being held at Point Lookout, Maryland.

Marine sea-based amphibious operations included the "Old" CSS Savannah shore party at Fort Beauregard, Phillips Island, South Carolina to evacuate the garrison under attack. Marines under the command of Commodore Josiah Tattnall III were used to construct and man shore batteries which turned back Union gunboats and monitors both at Richmond and at Savannah.

The end of the war found most surviving Confederate States Marines gathered together in Richmond in support of the last desperate defenses of the South. Marines in Virginia were part of the General Richard S. Ewell's Corps which fought with distinction at the Battle of Sayler's Creek, the last major battle before the surrender of Lee's Army at Appomattox. 28 Marines surrendered and received their paroles at Appomattox on April 9.

== Uniform ==
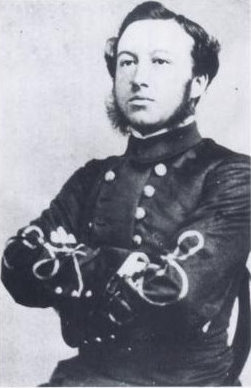
Example of a Confederate Marine Corps uniform (Confederate Marine Lt Frances H. Cameron in 1864)

Their uniform resembled that prescribed for the Confederate Army, but since the CSMC was not as large and many of its records were destroyed in 1865, there is controversy about the exact details of the uniform. It is clear, however, that the Marines were often equipped out of the stores of whichever garrison was nearest their location. One description has the Marines dressed in frock coats of a particular (and undetermined) shade of gray and dark blue or black trousers. It appears that Confederate States Marines wore forage caps although it is unclear if there was any ornamentation on the cover. Much of the gear worn by the CSMC was imported from the United Kingdom and its empire, namely Canada.

=== Rank Insignia ===
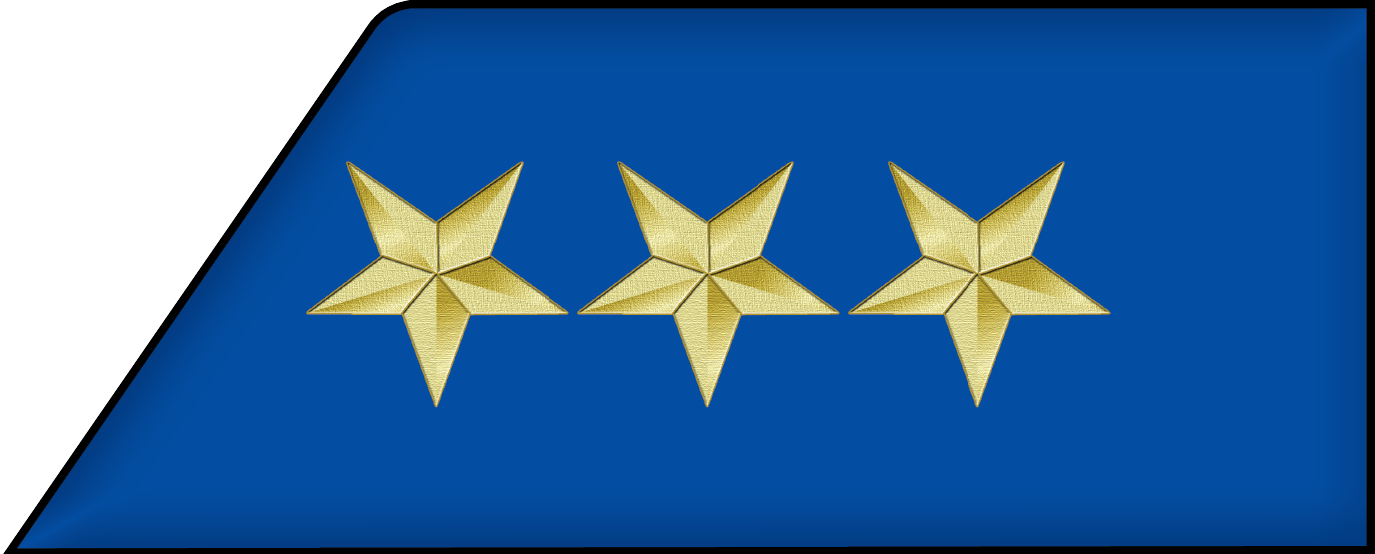
Colonel-Commandant

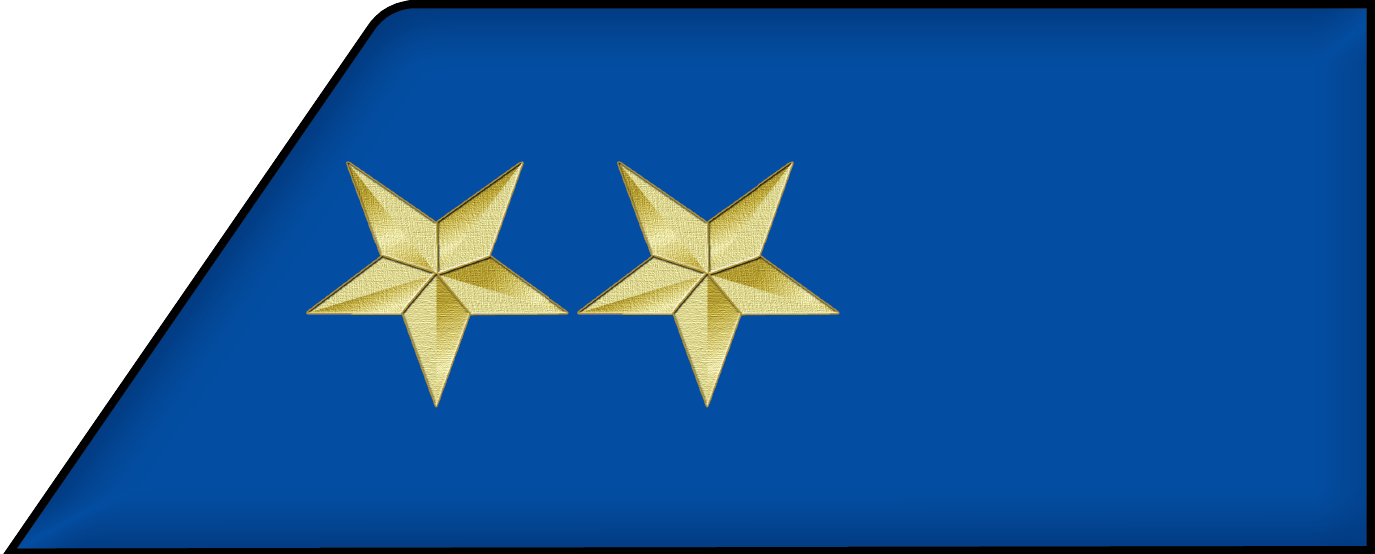
Lieutenant colonel

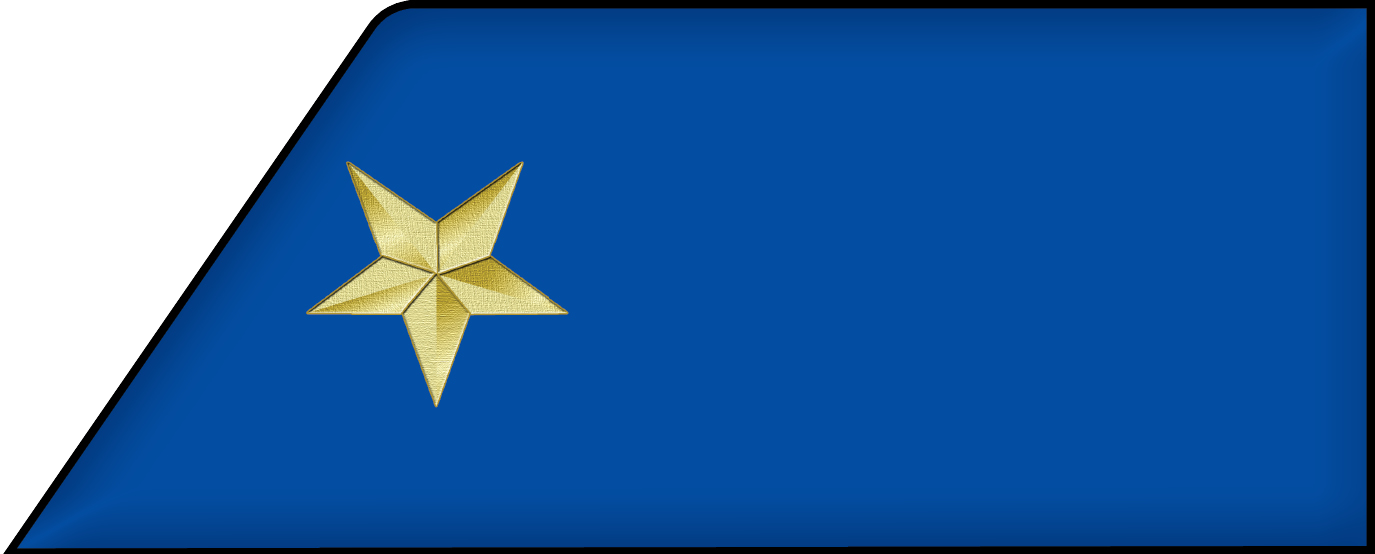
Major

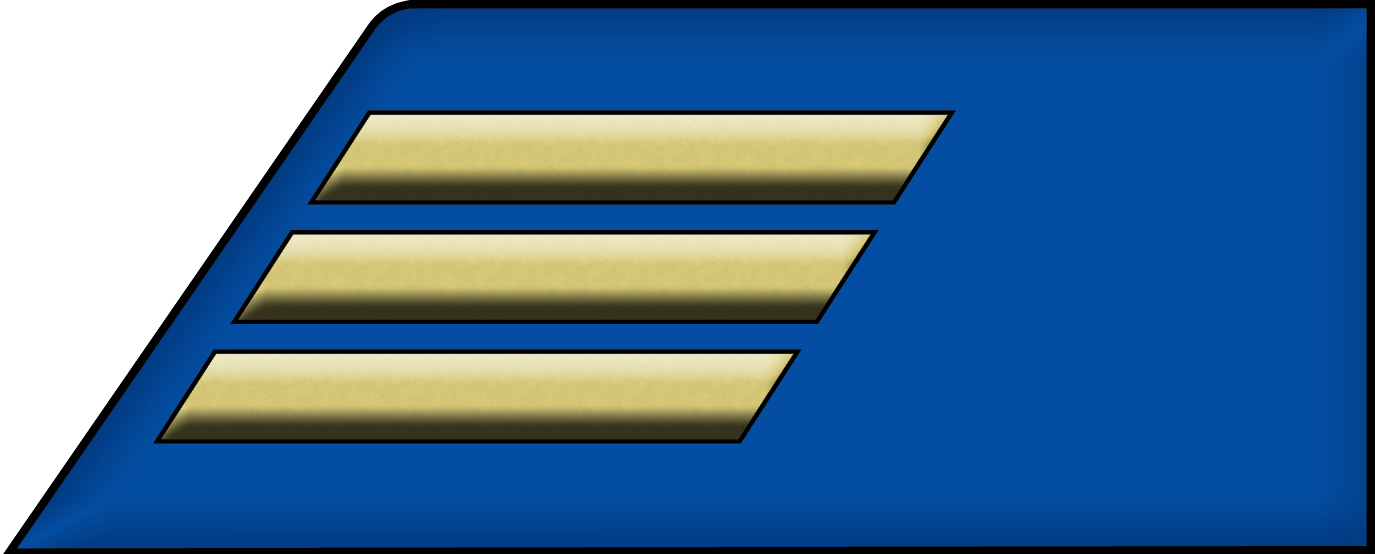
Captain

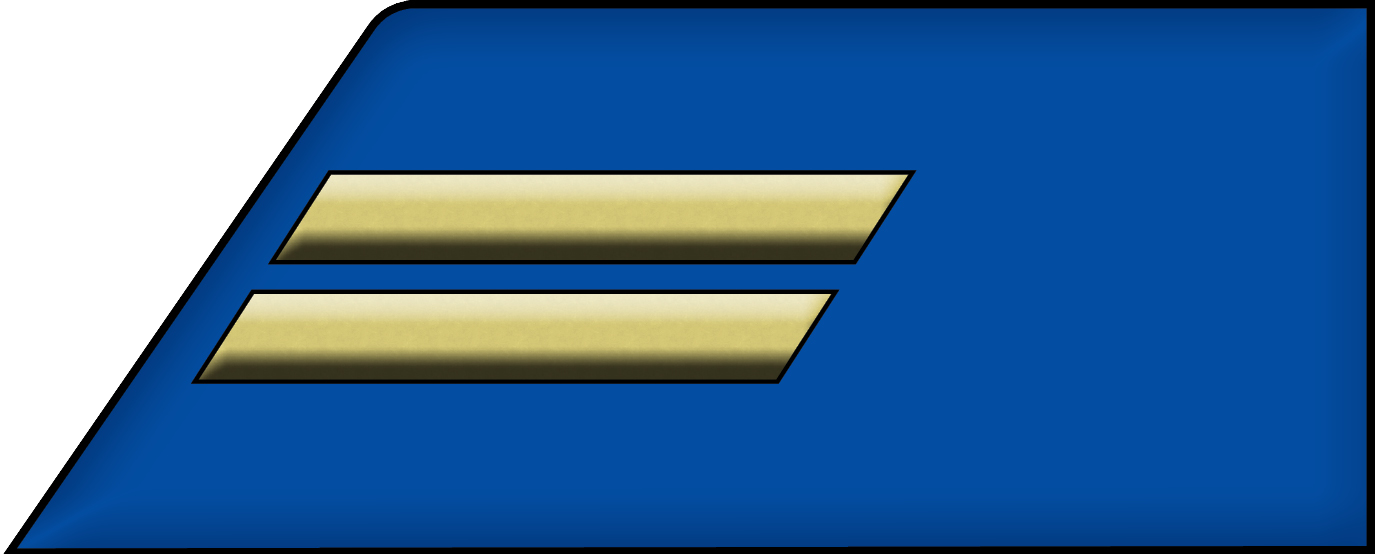
First Lieutenant

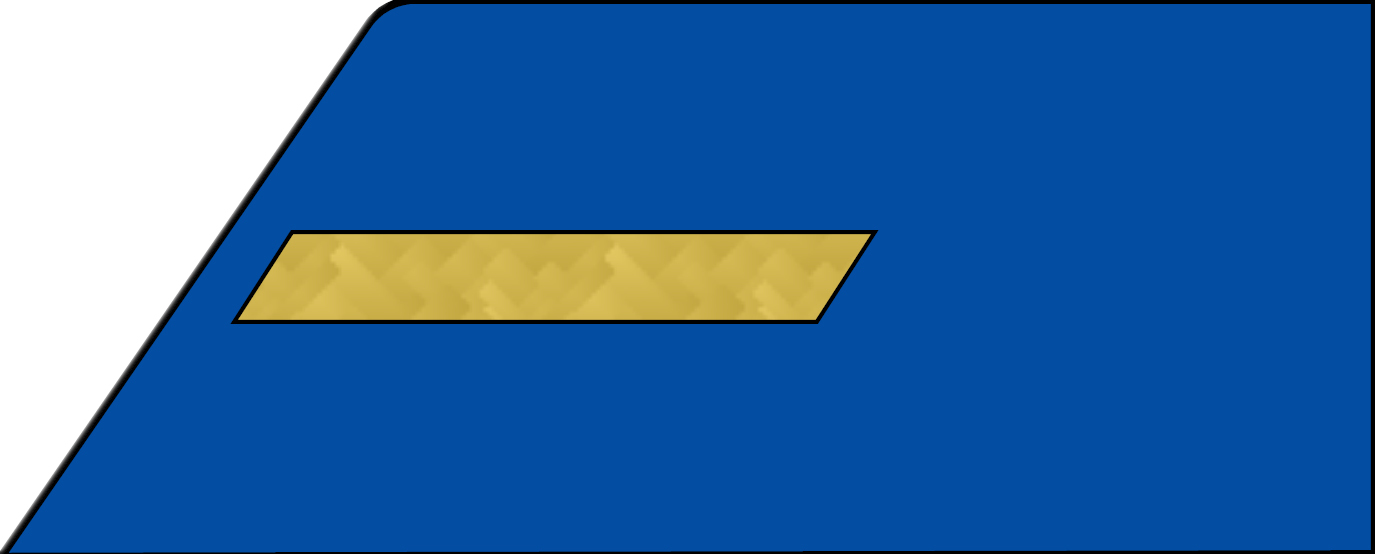
Second lieutenant

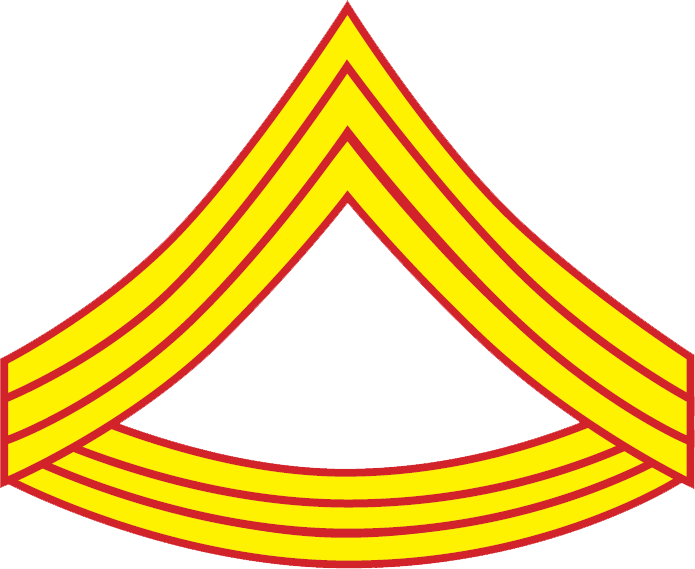
Sergeant Major

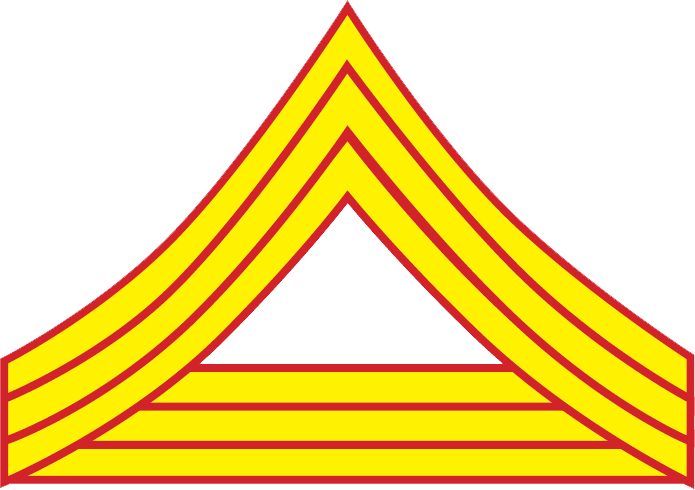
Quartermaster Sergeant

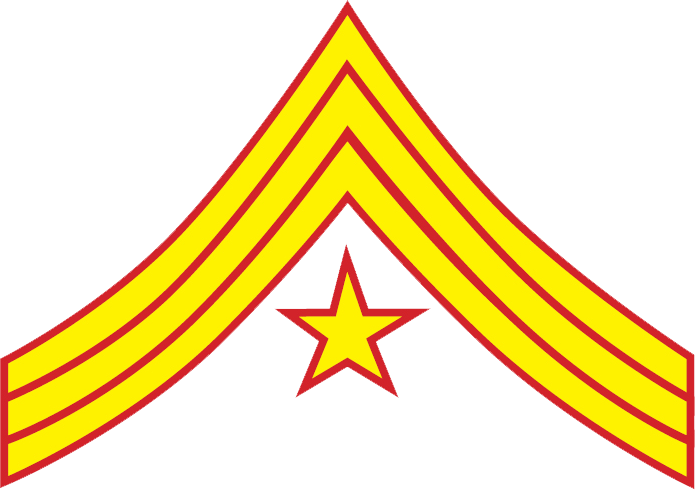
Ordnance Sergeant

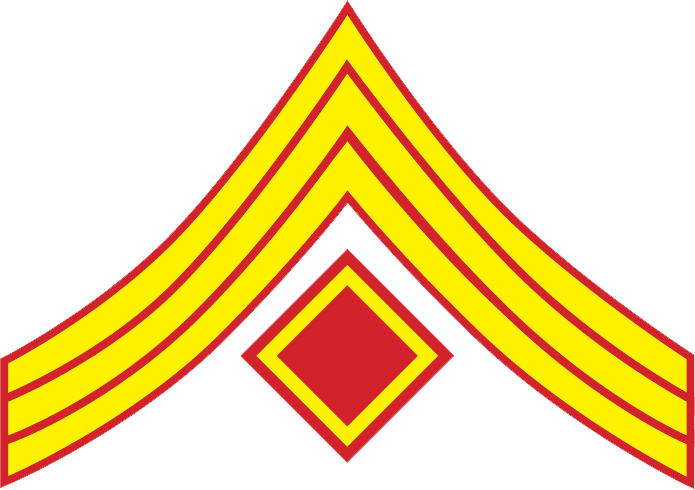
First Sergeant

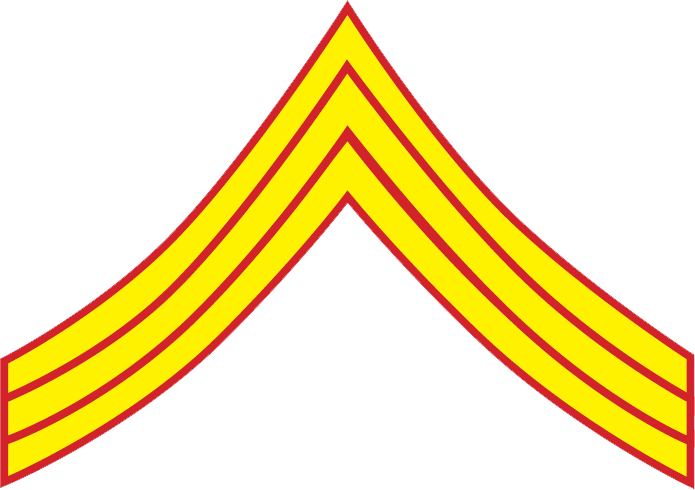
Sergeant

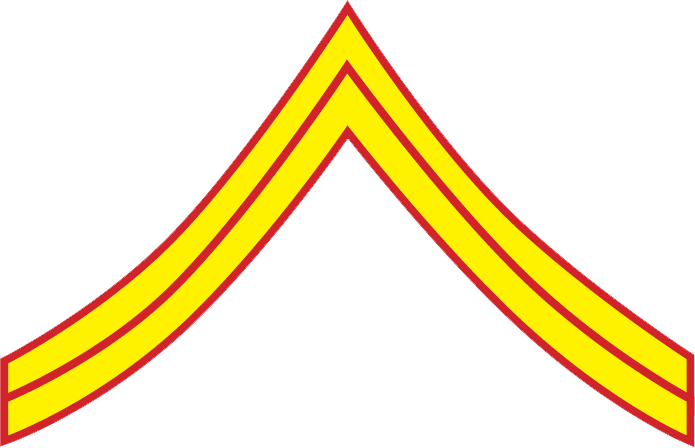
Corporal

The forage cap insignias were the same hunting horn surrounding the Marine corps M on a red background. This is verified as being placed on a sun hat worn by a CS marine at the 75 reunion.

== See also ==
- Blockade runners of the American Civil War
- Battle of Fort Pulaski/Federal blockade and contact
- Bibliography of American Civil War naval history
- Confederate States Army
- Marines

== References and further reading ==
- Donnelly, Ralph W. (1959). "Battle Honors and Services of Confederate Marines". Military Affairs. 23 (1): 37–40. doi:10.2307/1985252. JSTOR 1985252.
- Donnelly, Ralph W. (1989) The Confederate States Marine Corps: The Rebel Leathernecks,
- Donnelly, Ralph W. Biographical Sketches of the Commissioned Officers of the Confederate States Marine Corps (Published by the Author, 1973. Pp. xii, 68.)
  - Donnelly, Ralph W. Service Records of Confederate Enlisted Marines (Published by the Author, 1979. Pp. xxii, 125. Copies can be ordered from 913 Market Street, Washington, North Carolina 27889.)
- Krivdo, Michael E. "Marines in gray: the birth, life and death of the Confederate States Marine Corps" (PhD Diss. Texas A & M University, 2010). online
- Krivdo, Michael E. "Confederate Marine Corps Recruiting in New Orleans and Marine Activities in the First Year of the Civil War." Louisiana History 48.4 (2007): 441–466. online
- McGlone, John E., III, The Lost Corps: The Confederate States Marines, United States Naval Institute Proceedings, November 1972. online
- Scharf, J. Thomas (1887). History of the Confederate States Navy. New York: Rogers & Sherwood.
- Sullivan, David M., "Biographical Sketches Of The Commissioned Officers Of The Confederate States Marine Corps." White Mane Publishing, 2001.
- Sullivan, David M. "The Confederate States Marine Corps in South Carolina, 1861-1865." South Carolina Historical Magazine 86.2 (1985): 113–127. online
- Sullivan, David M. "Tennessee's Confederate Marines: Memphis Detachment." Tennessee Historical Quarterly 45.2 (1986): 152–168. online
