= William A. Webb =

American sailor and Mexican-American war veteran

- Born: William Augustin Webb; July 24, 1824; Virginia
- Died: December 1, 1881 (aged 57); Goochland County, Virginia
- Military career
- Allegiance: United States of America; Confederate States of America
- Branch: United States Navy; Confederate States Navy
- Service years: 1838–1861 USN; 1861–1865 CSN
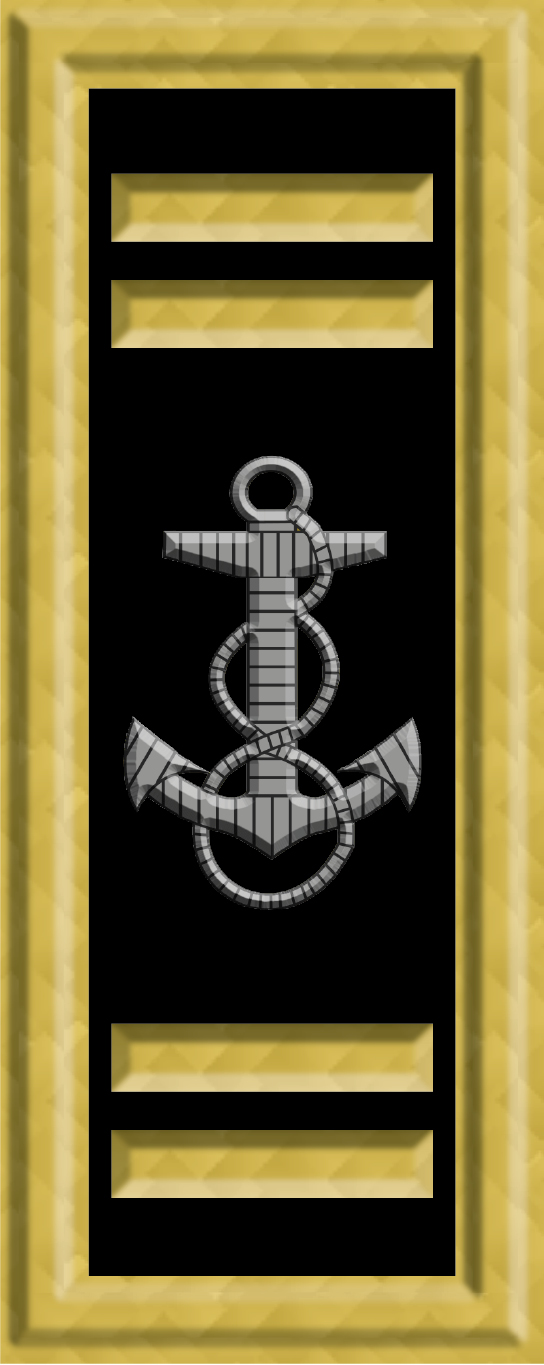
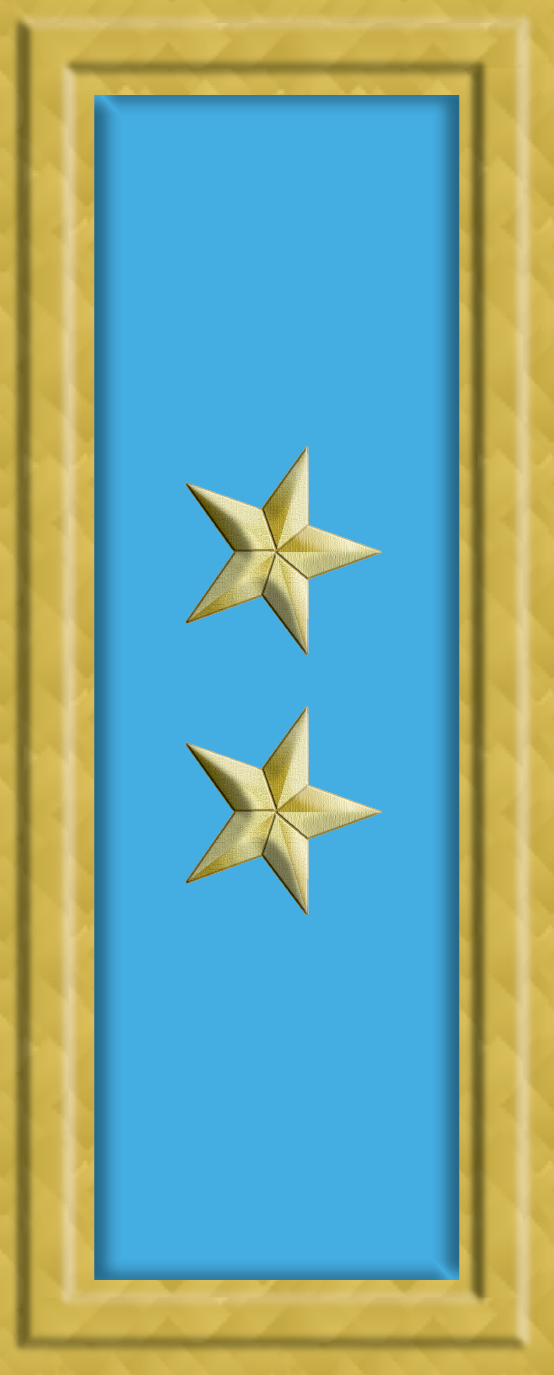
- Rank: Lieutenant (USN) Commander (CSN)
- Commands: CSS Teaser (1862); CSS Atlanta (May – June 17, 1863); CSS Richmond (1864)
- Conflicts: Battle of Hampton Roads; Battle of Wassaw Sound

William Augustin Webb (1824-1881) was an American sailor and Mexican–American War veteran who resigned his United States Navy commission after more than 20 years of service to join the Confederate States Navy in the American Civil War. Webb was decorated for his service as Captain of the CSS Teaser, part of the James River Squadron, during the Battle of Hampton Roads (1862).

In 1863, his orders sent him to Savannah, where he commanded a squadron that included the ironclad CSS Atlanta. He was captured in June 1863 and imprisoned in Boston. He was released as part of a prisoner exchange in October 1864 and returned to action on the CSS Richmond.

== Early life and career ==
William A. Webb grew up in Virginia. He joined the United States Navy at an early age and attained the rank of Midshipman on January 26, 1838. His young wife Elizabeth Ann Webb endured the lonely life of a navy spouse. He was the brother-in-law to another naval officer John Randolph Tucker.

On July 2, 1845, Webb was promoted to Passed Midshipman. He served in the Mexican–American War on the 6-gun storeship USS Southampton. Webb departed from Norfolk, Virginia on February 7, 1847, traveling to the Pacific Ocean by way of Cape Horn, eventually reaching Japan in 1854. He was afterwards appointed as Master on October 9, 1853, and Lieutenant on June 12, 1854.

== Civil War ==
Webb resigned his commission on May 17, 1861, four months after the Secession, enrolling instead in the Confederate Navy as a First Lieutenant in June. He served at Fernandina, Florida in mid-1861 and then Richmond Station from 1861 to 1862.

=== CSS Teaser and the Battle of Hampton Roads ===
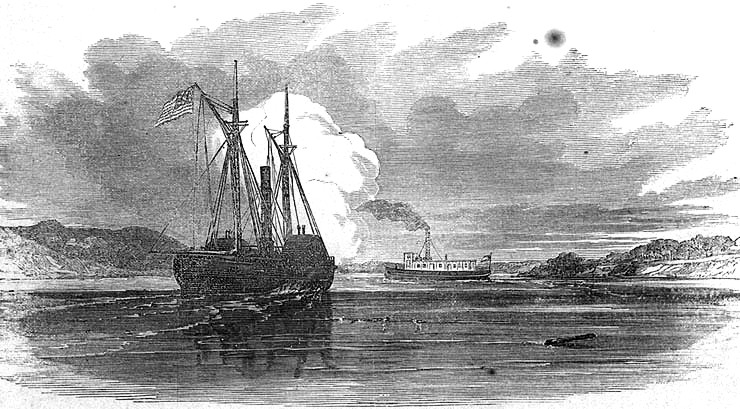
CSS Teaser in combat with USS Maratanza, July 4, 1862

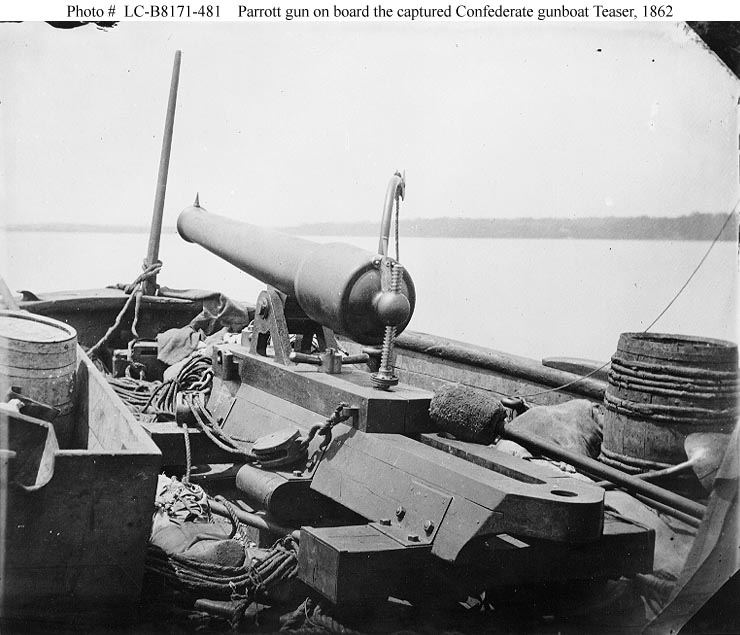
12-pounder on the bow

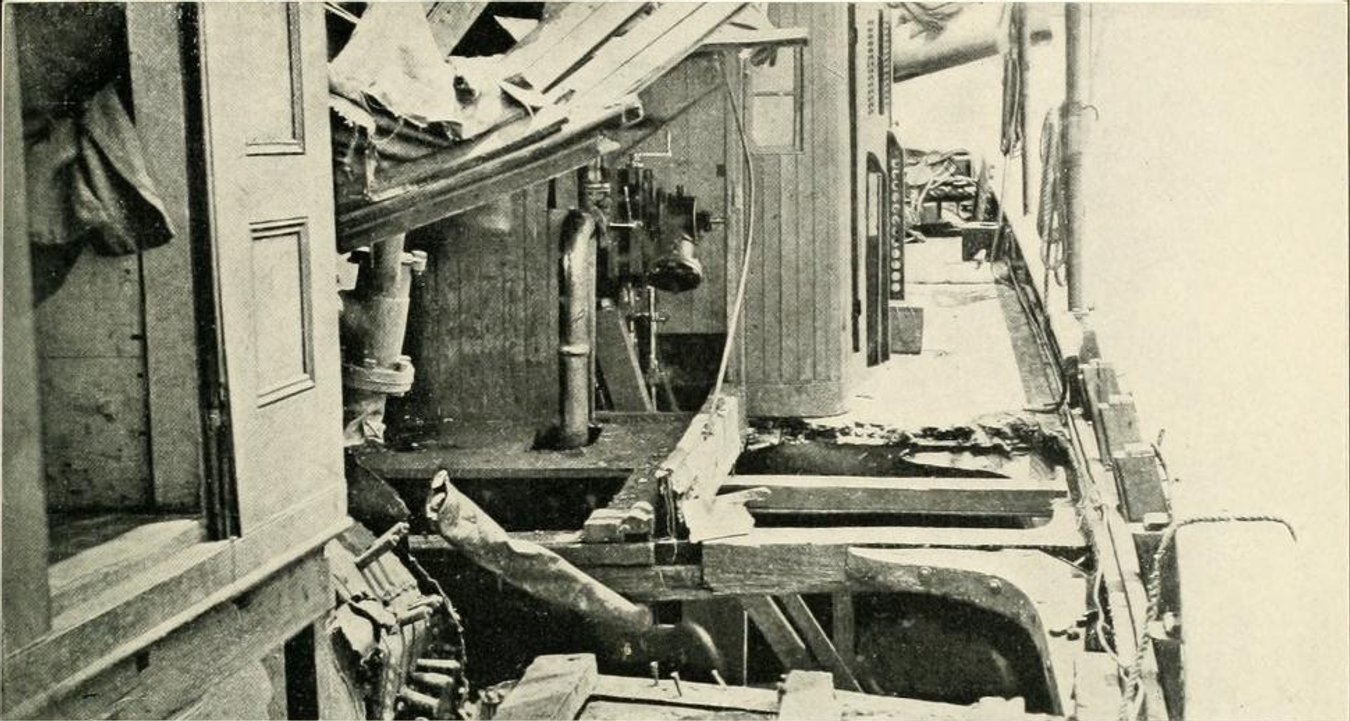
Deck detail

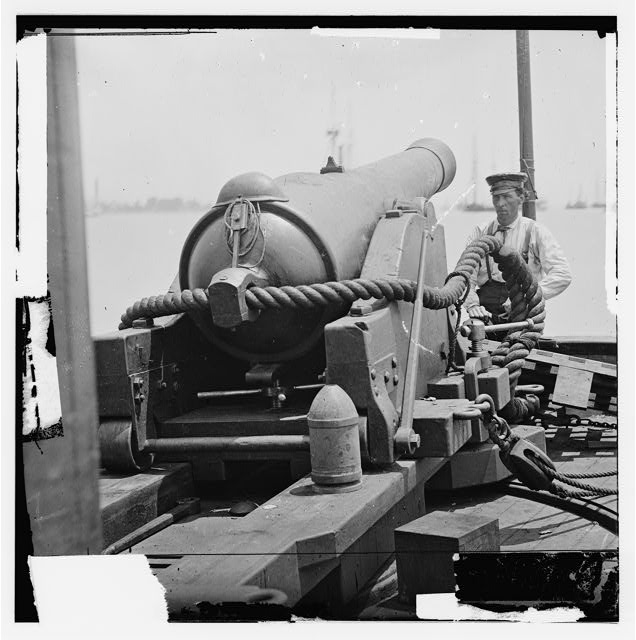
6.4 inch banded rifle, the stern pivot mount on the CSS Teaser. These guns were made by banding and rifling the 32-pounder smoothbore. This image is from the Library of Congress.

In early 1862, First Lieutenant Webb was made commander of the armed gunboat CSS Teaser (or Teazer). Prior to the secession it was the property of the Virginia State Navy (then called the York River). The 64 ton, 80 by 18 foot tugboat was armed with a 32 and a 12-pounder rifled cannon. The CSS Teaser was part of the James River Squadron, operating on the homonymous river from Norfolk. The squadron's chieftain was Flag-Officer Franklin Buchanan, on the ironclad steamer CSS Virginia (ex-Merrimack). The squadron consisted of 3 steamers (24 guns in all) and 3 supporting gunboats, each with one gun.

On March 8–9, 1862, at the Battle of Hampton Roads, the Confederate flotilla tried to break a blockade maintained by two wooden Union frigates, the USS Cumberland and the USS Congress. The Union ships were escorted by some gunboats and backed by shore batteries. Buchanan wrote later: "The general order under which the gunboat squadron went into action required that, in the absence of all signals, each commanding officer was to exercise his own judgment and discretion in doing all the damage he could to the enemy and to sink before surrendering." To support the CSS Virginia in this action, Capt. John Randolph Tucker, commanding the rest of the James River Squadron, ran past the shore batteries to join the battle, with the CSS Teaser "puffing with all the energy of a short-winded tug." They arrived just as the CSS Virginia had managed to sink the USS Cumberland.

Their escape was miraculous, as they were under a galling fire of solid shot, shell, grape and canister, a number of which passed through the vessels without doing any serious injury, except to the Patrick Henry...

— J. Thomas Scharf, historian

The squadron immediately joined in the battle with the CSS Virginia against the Union blockade and shore batteries. One eyewitness described the "little Teaser... pushed her way in between the Patrick Henry and Jamestown, and advancing close to the shore fired her one gun in face of the battery of sixty guns. Probably her insignificance saved her, for now every shot seemed concentrated upon the [Virginia]..." The Confederate squadron now concentrated their fire on the USS Congress and forced its surrender. When the Confederate ships charged with accepting the surrender and escorting the captured officers were fired upon by Union shore batteries, Buchanan then ordered another boat to burn her, with Webb's Teaser as cover. When they were also fired upon, Buchanan then ordered his men to destroy the USS Congress using "hot shot and incendiary shell".

The arrival of the USS Monitor on the following day resulted in the "world's first battle between ironclads". Neither the CSS Virginia, nor the USS Monitor suffered major damage. However, the Monitor's arrival forced the Confederate ships eventually to retreat without having broken the blockade.

Webb was reported later as "slightly wounded" during the battle. Buchanan took pride in his gunboats: "Their judgment in selecting their positions for attacking the enemy was good; their constant fire was destructive, and contributed much to the success of the day." The Confederate Congress also "thanked" Webb.

=== "Special duty" ===
During 1862–1863, Webb was stationed at Charleston station for "special duty." This term was typically used for a secret activity. In this case, Webb was made commander of the "Special Expedition", a squadron of small boats manned by sixty officers and men, on February 19, 1863. The squadron was stationed behind Fort Sumter in order to stop any Union ships that made it past the obstructions. What made this flotilla unusual, and hence its appellation of "special", was that the boats were armed with spar torpedoes, a highly controversial weapon of war that some considered "uncivilized". Webb assembled this squadron with a few cutters and a lot of canoes and skiffs, all armed with 20-foot long poles with a 60-pound torpedo.

It was not at all uncommon to see a sailor rolling down to his boat, when they were called for exercise, with a quid of tobacco in his cheek and a torpedo slung over his back; and when it is recollected that each torpedo had seven sensitive fuses which a tap with a stick or blow with a stone was sufficient to explode and blow half the street down, it can readily be believed that we gave them a wide berth.

— J. Thomas Scharf, historian

The only thing the small flotilla was lacking were steamers and Capt. John Randolph Tucker ordered Webb to contact a local merchant and acquire the steamers "quietly and pleasantly if possible" or seize them, if not.

While present when Admiral Du Pont's fleet crossed the Charleston Bar on April 6, 1863, Webb's squadron was not called into action that day. Eager to make use of the torpedoes, Tucker, Gen. Beauregard and Webb hatched a plan on April 10 that would "shake Abolitiondom to [its] foundation." They decided to attack each of the seven Union ironclads by three torpedo boats, but in the several days it took to get the extra boats required, the Union ironclads had left Charleston.

=== CSS Atlanta ===
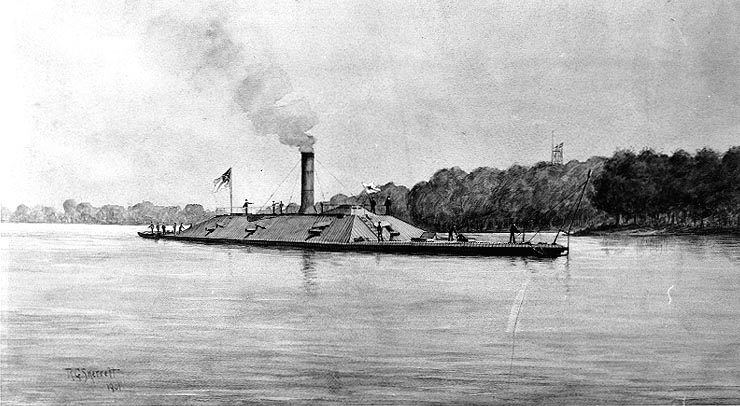
CSS Atlanta

Commodore Josiah Tattnall III, Flag Officer commanded the southern region of the Confederate States, especially Savannah, Georgia. He was expected to repeat his success commanding the CSS Virginia in crushing the wooden Union ships in the James River. Tattnall was handicapped in bringing this to fruition because of the blockade. In May 1863, Webb replaced Tatnall as commander of the CSS Atlanta ironclad, launched in 1862, and flag officer of the Savannah Squadron, with "the implied condition of his appointment being that he should 'do something' with her..." Webb proclaimed that "the whole abolition fleet" had "no terror" for him.

Considered by the citizens of Georgia to be the most powerful Confederate warship because of its fast speed of 7 knots, as well as its armament of four Brooke rifles, the Atlanta was difficult to maneuver. Special difficulties were caused by its 16-feet draft in the shallow waters surrounding Savannah. Another problem was the scarce airflow of its tight, armored roof, which caused profound heat and humidity. The Atlanta suffered profuse leaking. The ship's helm was already difficult to steer because it was simply unwieldy: the ship frequently stalled into sand banks along the side of the river. Webb marshaled the CSS Atlanta, though, removing the boat of unnecessary comfort - including sanitation and ventilation, as well as fully outfitting it with weaponry. Webb also had to deal with inexperienced sailors, most of whom were recruited from the Confederate Army around the mountainous regions of Georgia. For instance, his pilots arrived just two weeks before the ship engaged in the Battle of Wassaw Sound.

Although beset by problems, Webb was still excited about his prospects. He formulated ambitiously elaborate plans for the CSS Atlanta's first mission to clear the region of nearby Union forces. Webb was supposed to await reinforcement: the Confederate Congress voted to reinforce his squad with another ship still under construction: the CSS Savannah ironclad. Webb, however, waged action in Wassaw Sound against orders on June 17, 1863. He was escorted by two wooden steamers, the CSS Isondiga and the CSS Resolute. A percussion torpedo was attached to a large, projecting ram.

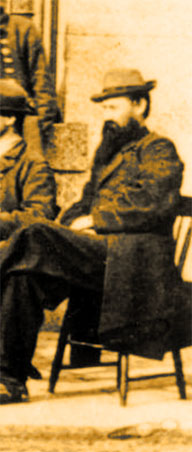
William A. Webb as a captive in Fort Warren

The Union expected Webb's move per intelligence reports and dispatched Captain John Rodgers in the USS Weehawken, escorted by the USS Nahant. The Atlanta suddenly ran aground and swayed at an angle which made it difficult to shoot. The USS Weehawken held fire until it was at 300 yards and then pounded the immobile ship, basically turning into target practice for the Union ship. After receiving five of the Weehawken's 350-pound shots, which knocked a hole in her casemate, crushed the pilot house and port shutter and severely wounded its pilots and several helmsmen, Webb was compelled to surrender immediately. The "battle" lasted only a few minutes, and the Atlanta became the first Confederate ironclad to surrender to the Union. He told his crew: "I most earnestly wish that it had happened otherwise, but Providence, for some good reason, has interfered with our plans ..." Meanwhile, the two boats escorting the Atlanta scurried upriver for safety. The USS Nahant had watched the action without firing a shot.

... his behavior on this occasion was as gallant and seamenlike as when he carried the cockleshell gunboat Teaser into action on the James River. His stranded ship would have become a slaughter-pen under a few more of the Weehawken's shots ...

— J. Thomas Scharf, historian

However, the news stunned the South and Webb faced criticism even after the war from experienced naval officers. He was brave, yes, but lacked good sense. Criticism also fell on Secretary of the Navy, Stephen R. Mallory for his policy of replacing older officers with younger ones and for not firmly opposing Webb in his decision.

The CSS Atlanta suffered the sole fatality of the battle, as well as 16 wounded. From 136 to 165 men were taken captive and moved to the ships USS Cimarron and USS Oleander. These travelled to Fort Lafayette, in New York Harbor, and arrived in late June at Fort Warren on Georges Island in Boston Harbor.

Fort Warren was a relatively modern jail where the prisoners were registered and photographed. However, they were deprived of blankets, food, and clothing. Among the captive sailors, there were 12 deaths due to injuries, as well as death by pneumonia and dysentery, caused by the poor conditions in which they were held. Three healthy crew members escaped. Webb was the first to gain parole, in September 1864, and was later exchanged in October of the same year.

=== CSS Richmond ===
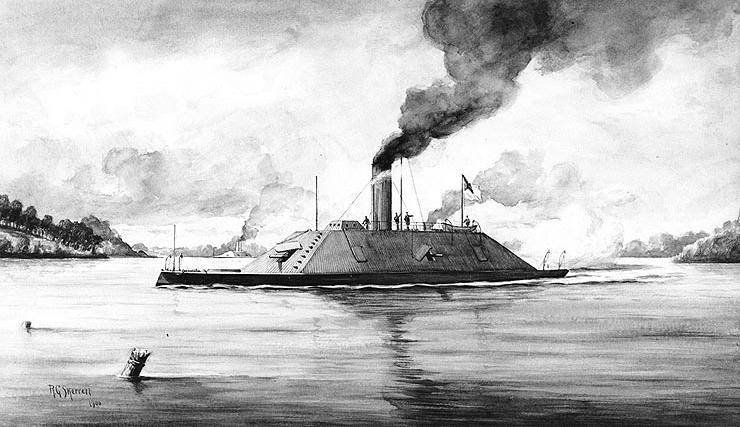
CSS Richmond

Webb was paroled on September 28, 1864, and exchanged at Cox's Wharf, Virginia on October 18, 1864. He was then again fighting on the James River, as Commander of the CSS Richmond from October through November 1864. Webb was in command of the Richmond, when the James River Squadron, of which Richmond was a member, during a routine patrol of the James River, were surprised on the morning of October 22, 1864, when the Union Army revealed their new battery at Boulware House, two miles from Chaffin's Bluff. To cover the retreat of the wooden vessels of the fleet, the flagship Virginia II approached the battery, followed by the Richmond and Fredericksburg, and effected the retreat upstream to Chaffin's Bluff. Though they were caught by surprise, this small action helped determine the effectiveness of the ironclads' casemates against close rifled fire, and in the case of the Richmond the results were favorable: her armor withstood the fire, though her smokestack was shot off.

== Retirement ==
William A. Webb subsequently relinquished command of the CSS Richmond because of declining health. For this reason, as well as unspecified business matters, he left the Confederacy, in December, 1864, for England. While in London, he took the Oath of Allegiance before Francis A. Adams, the U.S. Consul in that city, on 31 May 1865, and left England the next month, to return home to his native state of Virginia. By mid-1865, after the close of the war, he was already back in Richmond, Virginia, and requested a pardon from President Andrew Johnson, which was approved shortly afterwards.

He died at his home in Goochland County on December 1, 1881.

== Notes ==
Preceded by Boatswain (Master) William H. Face	Commander of CSS Teaser; February 1862-June ? 1862	Succeeded by Lt. Hunter Davidson
Preceded by Josiah Tattnall III	Commander of CSS Atlanta; May 1863-June 17, 1863	Succeeded by none
Preceded by Robert B. Pegram	Commander of CSS Richmond; October–November 1864	Succeeded by James D. Johnston
