= Gustavus H. Scott =

United States Navy admiral (1812–1882)

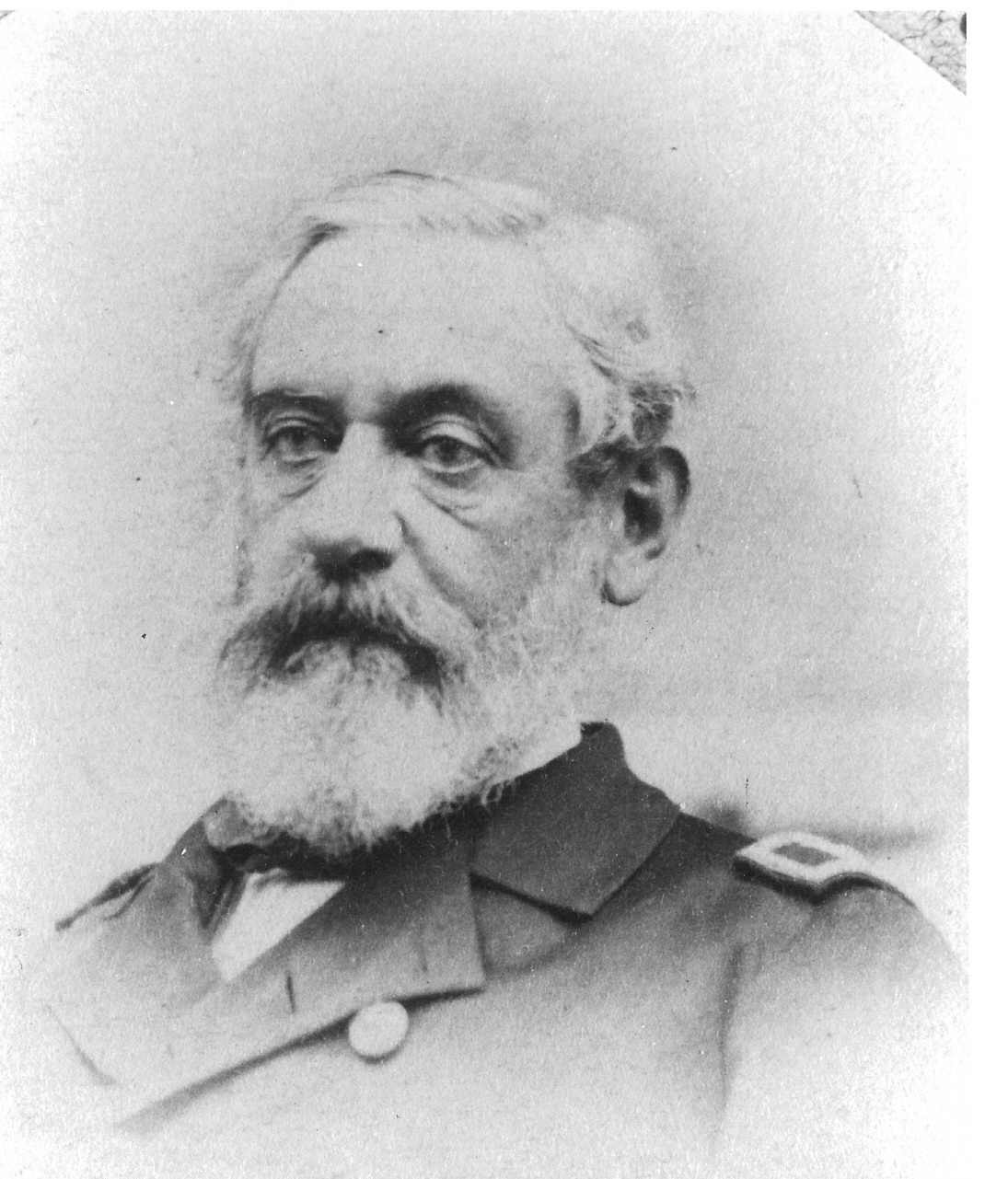
- Born: June 13, 1812; Fairfax County, Virginia, US
- Died: March 23, 1882 (aged 69); Washington, D.C., US
- Burial place: Oak Hill Cemetery, Washington, D.C. (1882–96); Arlington National Cemetery, Arlington, Virginia (1896–)
- Military career
- Allegiance: United States
- Branch: United States Navy
- Service years: 1828–1874
- Rank: Rear admiral
- Commands: USS Keystone State; USS Maratanza; USS De Soto; USS Canandaigua; USS Saranac; North Atlantic Squadron
- Conflicts: Second Seminole War American Civil War Union blockade Peninsula Campaign Siege of Yorktown Drewry's Bluff

Gustavus Hall Scott (13 June 1812 – 23 March 1882) was an officer in the United States Navy who served in the Second Seminole War and the American Civil War. He rose to the rank of rear admiral and late in his career was commander-in-chief of the North Atlantic Squadron.

== Early life ==
Scott was born in Fairfax County, Virginia, on 13 June 1812, the son of Gustavus Hall Scott (b. 1786) and Elizabeth Douglas (Marshall) Scott.

== Naval career ==
=== Early career ===
Scott was appointed as a midshipman on 1 August 1828. His first tour of duty was aboard the frigate USS Guerriere in the Pacific Squadron from 1829 to 1831. He was present off Charleston, South Carolina, during the Nullification Crisis of 1832, and next served aboard the schooner USS Experiment in the Chesapeake Bay in 1833. Promoted to passed midshipman on 14 June 1834, he was aboard the sloop-of-war USS Vandalia in the West Indies Squadron from 1835 to 1836, seeing service in the Second Seminole War. He spent 1837 awaiting orders, but returned to sea aboard Vandalia in the West Indies Squadron from 1838 to 1839, seeing further Second Seminole War service.

Promoted to lieutenant on 25 February 1841, Scott served aboard the ship of the line USS Columbus in the Mediterranean Squadron from 1843 to 1844. After special duty in 1845, he returned to the Mediterranean Squadron with a tour aboard the frigate USS United States from 1846 to 1847. He had ordnance duty from 1848 to 1849 and, after awaiting orders during 1850, returned to ordnance duty in 1851. He served aboard the frigate USS St. Lawrence as flag lieutenant of the Pacific Squadron from 1852 to 1853, followed by a tour aboard the steamer USS Michigan on the Great Lakes from 1855 to 1857; he was promoted to commander on 27 December 1856 while aboard Michigan. He served as a lighthouse inspector from 1858 to 1860.

=== American Civil War ===
The American Civil War broke out in April 1861. Resisting encouragement from fellow Virginians to resign his commission and fight for the Confederate States of America, Scott remained loyal to the Union and was assigned to special service in command of the sidewheel steamer SS Keystone State, which the U.S. Navy chartered from her owners on 19 April 1861 for use in searching for the Confederate States Navy commerce raider CSS Sumter in June 1861. After the U.S. Navy purchased the ship and commissioned her as USS Keystone State on 19 July 1861, Scott became the first commanding officer in her career as a commissioned warship. Keystone State then joined in the Union blockade of the Confederate States of America, searching for Confederate blockade runners in Caribbean ports as a part of the West India Squadron. She captured the blockade runner Saloon off Tampico, Mexico, on 10 October 1861 and towed her to Key West Florida, and then on to Philadelphia, Pennsylvania.

After turning command of Keystone State over to Commander William E. Le Roy on 12 November 1861, Scott took command of the new gunboat USS Maratanza when she was commissioned on 12 April 1862. Assigned to the North Atlantic Blockading Squadron, Maratanza immediately went to work on the York and James rivers in Virginia in support of the Army of the Potomac's Peninsula Campaign. Scott commanded Maratanza in the capture of Yorktown, after which she shelled Confederate positions at Wormley's Creek and Murrell's Inlet, took part in the Battle of Drewry's Bluff, and rendered valuable service in saving supplies abandoned by the Army of the Potomac at Aquia Creek. On 4 July 1862, Maratanza opened fire on the Confederate States Navy steamer CSS Teaser on the James River and captured her after hitting her boiler, causing the boiler to explode and forcing Teaser's crew to abandon ship. After the conclusion of the Peninsula Campaign, Maratanza joined the blockade off Wilmington, North Carolina, in September 1862, firing at Fort Casswell on 25 September 1862 and capturing the sloop Express off the coast of South Carolina on 4 May 1863.

Scott was promoted to captain on 4 November 1863 and took command of the steamer USS De Soto in the East Gulf Blockading Squadron in early November 1863. Under his command, De Soto patrolled off Northeast Providence Channel in the Bahamas and off Mobile Bay, Alabama, where she captured the steamer Cumberland and her cargo of arms, ammunition, and gunpowder on 5 February 1864. After De Soto was decommissioned and quarantined due to an outbreak of yellow fever among her crew in the spring of 1864, Scott moved on to command of the sloop-of-war USS Canandaigua in the South Atlantic Blockading Squadron, engaged in operations off Charleston, South Carolina, through the end of the war in April 1865. He was the senior officer present at the surrender of Charleston in 1865.

=== Post-Civil War ===
Scott's first postwar tour was as commanding officer of the sloop of war USS Saranac in the Pacific Squadron. He was a member of the examining board for the admission of volunteer officers to the regular navy in 1868. Promoted to commodore on 10 February 1869, he served as a lighthouse inspector from 1869 to 1871.

Promoted to rear admiral on 14 February 1873, Scott became commander-in-chief of the North Atlantic Squadron in May 1873. The most significant crisis of his tenure as commander-in-chief was the Virginius Affair, which took place in November 1873 when the Spanish Navy screw corvette Tornado captured the fast American sidewheel steamer SS Virginius, operated by an American and British crew and hired by Cuban insurrectionists to land men and munitions in Cuba for use against Spanish forces during Cuba's Ten Years' War. Tornado brought Virginius to Santiago de Cuba, where Spanish authorities in Cuba found the crew of Virginius guilty of piracy and sentenced them to death by firing squad. The Spanish authorities executed 53 of them before British and American warships arrived and threatened to bombard the city if the executions did not cease. In case a war with Spain broke out, the United States Department of the Navy ordered the entire North Atlantic Squadron, South Atlantic Squadron, and European Squadron to concentrate at Key West, Florida.

By the time the last of the ships arrived on 4 February 1874, the crisis had passed, but the Department of the Navy decided to take advantage of the unusual peacetime concentration of warships to conduct the first multi-ship, open-ocean tactical exercises in U.S. Navy history. During the exercises, the Department of the Navy placed the assembled ships under the overall command of the commander-in-chief of the European Squadron, Rear Admiral Augustus Case, with Commodore Foxhall A. Parker, Jr., as Case's chief of staff. Case was senior to Scott, but to avoid an awkward situation with regard to the chain of command of the combined squadrons during the exercise, the Department of the Navy ordered Scott to conduct a cruise to Cuba and the Windward Islands to assess and report on conditions there in the wake of the Virginius Affair. Temporarily turning his ships over to Case for the fleet exercises on 3 January 1874, Scott departed Key West aboard his flagship, the sloop-of-war USS Worcester, for his special mission. By the time he returned on 1 April 1874, Case had completed the exercises and departed, and Scott resumed his normal duties as commander-in-chief of the North Atlantic Squadron.

Scott turned over command of the North Atlantic Squadron to Rear Admiral J. R. M. Mullany on 13 June 1874 and retired from the Navy the same day, having that day reached the statutory retirement age of 62.

== Death ==
In retirement, Scott resided in Washington, D.C., where he died at his residence on 23 March 1882. He was initially buried in Washington at Oak Hill Cemetery. In 1896, his remains were exhumed and reburied at Arlington National Cemetery in Arlington, Virginia.

== Bibliography ==
=== References ===
- Hamersly, Lewis Randolph. The Records of Living Officers of the U.S. Navy and Marine Corps, Third Edition. Philadelphia: J. B. Lippincott & Co., 1878.
- Rentfrow, James C. Home Squadron: The U.S. Navy on the North Atlantic Station. Annapolis, Maryland: Naval Institute Press, 2014. ISBN 978-1-61251-447-5.

Military offices
Preceded by Samuel Phillips Lee	Commander-in-Chief, North Atlantic Squadron; May 1873–13 June 1874	Succeeded by J. R. M. Mullany
