= Hatch Auditorium =

Assembly hall owned by the North Carolina Baptist Assembly

Coordinates: 33°53′33″N 78°1′5″W

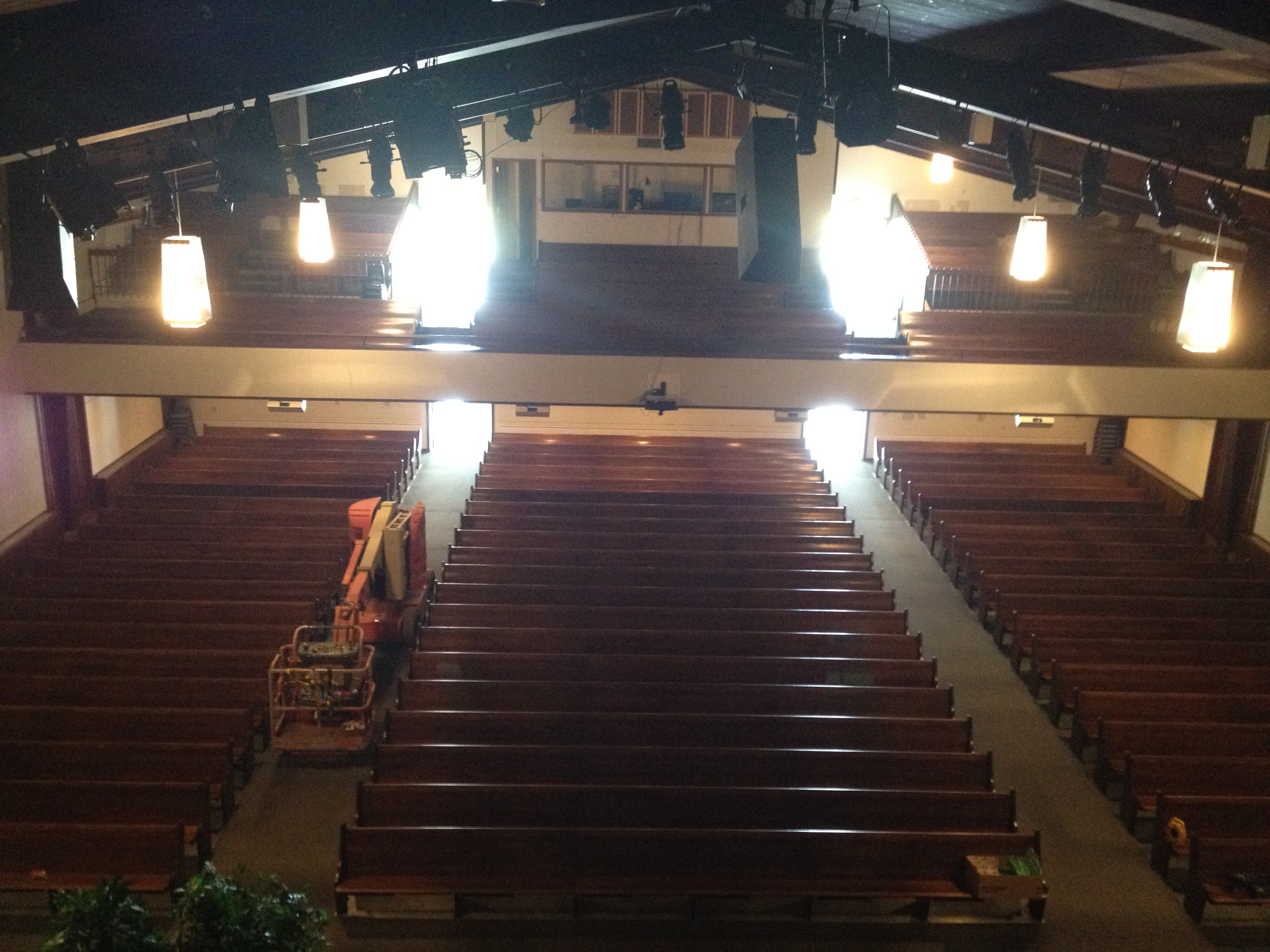
Interior view from the rafters above the stage.

Hatch Auditorium is a facility of the North Carolina Baptist Assembly at Fort Caswell. The auditorium is situated next to the old Fort Caswell and faces the parade ground. Construction of the auditorium was made possible by a gift from Rachel E. Hatch upon her death in October 1966. Her estate, which included 1,500 acres (6.1 km^{2}) in Duplin County, was valued at $200,000. Hatch was an Episcopalian who is quoted as saying, "The Baptists have their hand on the pulse of humanity and seek to touch the needs of the people."

Ground was broken in the fall of 1967, and the auditorium was dedicated on July 17, 1968, with a trumpet fanfare and singing. Total cost of the auditorium was $400,000.

== Layout ==
The auditorium consists of the main floor, an upstairs and downstairs front lobby, a balcony, and two classrooms behind the stage. In the original building, two rooms opposite each other in the upstairs lobby served as a kitchen and sitting room. Those rooms now serve as utility and storage.

The main floor and balcony accommodate approximately 1,000 people in pew seating. To the rear and center of the balcony there is a sound booth with an excellent view of the stage. The stage itself is surprisingly large and it is currently rumored that it may be shortened in an effort to add more seating. The classrooms are known as "Hatch A," located just behind stage left, and "Hatch B" which is behind stage right. To each side of the stage there are double doors leading into side exit lobby areas. These lobbies also have the entrances to the classrooms and directly to the stage itself.

The downstairs lobby of Hatch has two of the auditorium's restrooms (the other two are located in the rear hallway which connects the two classrooms) and they face each other on the left and right sides next to the entrances to the main floor. On the wall between the entrances hangs a portrait of Rachel Hatch.

== Features ==
The exterior of the building was originally designed to reflect its wooden interior and was brown. It wasn't until the campus was completely standardized to its now familiar blue/gray tones that Hatch was repainted. The front upstairs and downstairs lobbies are, essentially, one room with two staircases leading up. One of the most remarkable features of the building is its glass facade which stretches over both floors. Inside the auditorium itself, the rafters are painted brown and wood is the dominante design texture. The curved back wall of the auditorium features an intricate pattern of small beams which also work to disguise the built in organ speakers. These speakers appear to be a part of the wall itself. Also the back wall there is a large, brass cross mounted high above the stage.

The facility was recently (2006) upgraded in the sound and lights department with over 20 new lights mounted, a new lightboard, a new speaker system, and a digital soundboard.

== Sources ==
Herring, Ethel; Williams, Carolee (1999). Fort Caswell in War and Peace. Oak Island, NC: NC Baptist Assembly. ISBN 0-9671897-1-3.
