= USS Maratanza =

Gunboat of the United States Navy

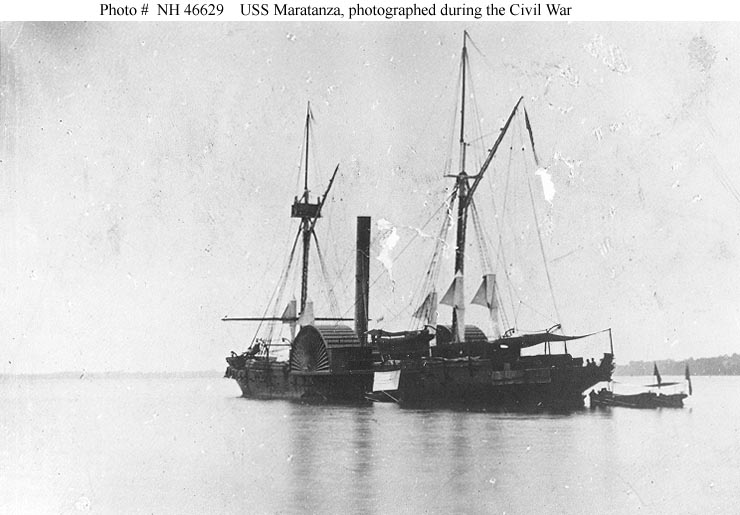

History

United States
- Name: USS Maratanza
- Laid down: 1861
- Launched: 26 November 1861
- Commissioned: 12 April 1862
- Decommissioned: 21 June 1865
- Fate: Sold August 1868
- Notes: Subsequently served in Haitian Navy as Salnave and Union

General characteristics
- Displacement: 786 tons
- Length: 209 ft (64 m)
- Beam: 32 ft (9.8 m)
- Draft: 9 ft 6 in (2.90 m)
- Propulsion: steam engine; side wheel-propelled
- Speed: 10 knots
- Armament: one 100-pounder gun; one 9" gun; four 24-pounder guns

USS Maratanza was a steamer acquired by the Union Navy during the American Civil War. She was used by the Union Navy as a gunboat to patrol navigable waterways of the Confederacy to prevent the South from trading with other countries.

== Service history ==
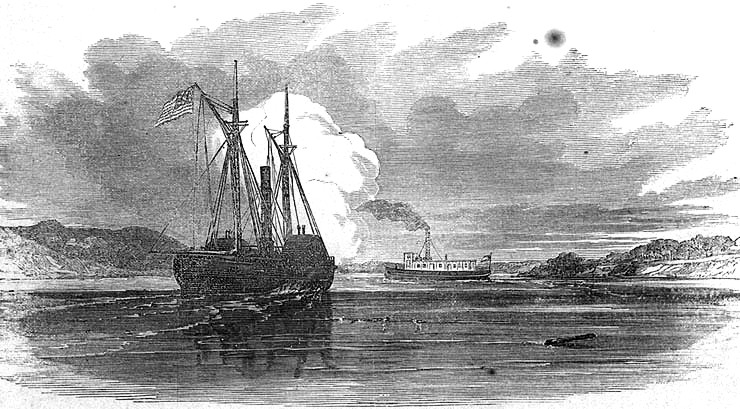
USS Maratanza captures CSS Teaser

Double-ender, wooden steamer Maratanza, built at Boston Navy Yard in 1861, was launched 26 November 1861 and commissioned at Boston, Massachusetts, on 12 April 1862, Commander Gustavus H. Scott in command. Immediately after commissioning, Maratanza saw service in support of General George B. McClellan's Peninsula Campaign, operating on the York and James rivers from April to September 1862. After participating in the capture of Yorktown on 3 May 1862, Maratanza shelled various points, including Wormley's Creek, Murrell's Inlet, and Fort Darling (Drewry's Bluff). En route to scouting Turkey Bend on 4 July 1862, she engaged and captured the Confederate steamer CSS Teaser at Haxall's.

After the collapse of the Peninsula Campaign, Maratanza departed Hampton Roads, Virginia, on 15 September 1862 for blockade and cruising duty off Wilmington, North Carolina, firing on Fort Casswell on 25 September 1862. She remained there on patrol duty through much of the conflict, joining USS Chocura in capturing the sloop Express off the South Carolina coast on 4 May 1863 and capturing the sloop Ceres on Western Bar, Smith's Island, North Carolina, on 7 December 1863. As Union forces assembled to move against Wilmington, Maratanza participated in the bombardment of Fort Fisher 24 and 25 December 1864 and 13 through 15 January 1865 when Admiral David Dixon Porter noted that the Union had enough forces there to hold against the whole Confederacy. Maratanza captured the steamers Stag and Charlotte on 20 January 1865. She participated in the bombardment and capture of Fort Anderson, North Carolina, on 19 February 1865, opening the way to Wilmington. In March 1865, General William Tecumseh Sherman was at Fayetteville, North Carolina, where boat crews from Maratanza, two other gunboats, and USS Eolus rendezvoused with him, opening communications between Sherman's position and the coast.

After the end of the conflict in April 1865, Maratanza was detached from her station on Cape Fear River in June 1865 and was ordered north, arriving at the Portsmouth Navy Yard in Kittery, Maine, on 18 June 1865 and decommissioning on 21 June 1865. She remained in ordinary at the Portsmouth Navy Yard until sold to A. B. & C. W. Lewis in August 1868. She subsequently served as a Haitian Navy gunboat under the names Salnave and Union.
