= William H. Face =

- Born: August 2, 1827
- Died: August 16, 1894 (aged 67)
- Military career
- Allegiance: Confederate States of America
- Branch: Confederate States Navy
- Rank: Acting Master
- Unit: CSS Teaser
- Conflicts: American Civil War: Battle of Hampton Roads

William Haley Face (2 August 1827 – 16 August 1894) served as Acting Master of CSS Teaser during the Battle of Hampton Roads (March 8–9, 1862). He was also at the center of an international incident in 1885 when, serving as a pilot with the Virginia Pilot Association, he was abducted by the Captain of a Russian warship.

== The Civil War and the Battle of Hampton Roads ==
Face was recognized in the official report of the battle by Franklin Buchanan, Flag Officer, Confederate States Navy. Buchanan, the captain of the ironclad CSS Virginia during the battle, cited Teaser for actions in support of Virginia's attack on the Federal fleet:

"Lt. Commanding Webb (William A. Webb) specially notices the coolness displayed by Acting Master Face... when facing the heavy fire of artillery and musketry from the shore..."

Teaser took an active part in both days of the battle, acting as tender to Virginia. She received the thanks of the Congress of the Confederate States for this action.

Face had previously commanded the boat (June 1861 – January 1862).

Teaser was built at Philadelphia, Pennsylvania. Purchased at Richmond, Virginia by the State of Virginia in 1861, she was assigned to the naval forces in the James River with Lieutenant James Henry Rochelle, Virginia State Navy, in command prior to June 1861.

Almost a year before the battle, in April 1861, as Virginia moved toward secession, the Federals laid torch to the Gosport Navy Yard to prevent its huge store of munitions from falling into Southern hands. Just as the fire was set, Face (commanding the steamer Raney) completed the first successful transfer of gunpowder from the Navy Yard to the future Confederate capital of Richmond. According to reports in newspapers North and South, Face was a "Virginia pilot, who was very prompt and energetic in the performance of the important duties assigned him, when men of nerve and action were in demand for special service."

Face was later assigned to be the first pilot for the second CSS Virginia when she was commissioned in May 1864.

== Career as a Virginia Pilot ==
Face did not serve in the U.S. Navy before the War, having made his profession as a pilot. Soon after the end of the conflict, Capt. Face was one of the 22 members of the Virginia Pilot Association upon its founding in 1866. The Pilot Association represents the ship pilots who guide all commercial shipping... and some military shipping... through the navigable waters of the state of Virginia.

=== Strelok incident ===
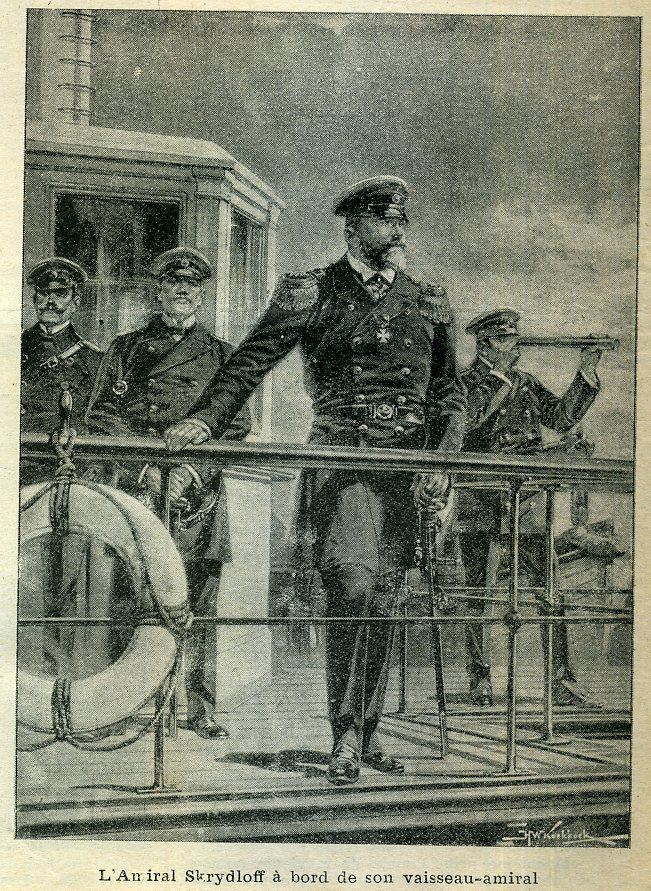
Nicholas Skrydloff as an admiral in the 1904 French journal Soleil Du Dimanche

In late April 1885, at the height of the diplomatic crisis between England and Russia known as the Panjdeh incident, Face was forced by Captain Nicholas Skrydloff of the Russian corvette Strelok to assist in that ship's stealthy exit from the Norfolk, Virginia harbor in order to evade the English man-of-war Garnet, which had been assigned to keep tabs on it. After a night on the town in Norfolk, including attending a concert with three of his officers, Skrydloff returned to his ship and summoned Face, indicating his intention to set sail in a few hours, at 2:00 the next morning. Face replied that he would be back in plenty of time, but the Russian officer insisted that the pilot come on board at once. The Richmond Dispatch reported that Skrydloff suggested in broken English, "You sleep late pelot " – adding with a shrug of the shoulders – "Come on board to-night." Having finally relented, Face was shown to his cabin, but no sooner had he taken a seat, than he sensed the ship was underway. Making his way to the pilot house, Face observed that Strelok's lights were out, and before long she was proceeding at full speed with all sails deployed and her engines "doing their best." Face informed Captain Skrydloff that he was breaking the law, to which the Russian responded with a laugh, "all right, pelot, it is so funny, you know." The newspaper reported that Skrydloff "laughed till his sides shook with enjoyment. The pilot couldn't see the fun, but he had nothing to do but to keep under way."

Strelok would pass within a half mile from Garnet off Fort Monroe, but the British apparently never caught sight of her. The commander "kept laughing and declaring it was so funny," slapping Face on the back, the Dispatch reported. Fortunately, and with some difficulty, Face was able to be put off some six miles out to sea, but only because Strelok happened upon one of the Pilot Association boats.

The Strelok incident was headline news in major newspapers, as journalists relished reporting Captain Skrydloff's clever evasion of Garnet.

After leaving Norfolk, Strelok sailed to New York harbor, soon to be followed by Garnet. Within some weeks, diplomatic temperatures had cooled, allowing Strelok to return to Russia.

The following year, Strelok symbolically healed the rift between the two nations, when she joined in a salute to the fourth Duchess of Edinburgh during her visit to Marseilles, France – the Duchess being the daughter of Russian Czar Alexander III and the daughter-in-law of British Queen Victoria.

Skrydloff went on to become the "bulldog admiral" of the Czarist navy, commander of the Baltic Fleet and Russian Navy Minister.

Three years after the Strelok incident, William H. Face's son and fellow Virginia Pilot, George Washington Face, was also abducted by a foreign ship captain, John Owens in command of the British steamer North Erin, who evaded a U.S. marshal and absconded to Liverpool with $14,000 worth of cotton. George Washington Face was forced to cross the Atlantic twice before returning to Virginia a month later.

== Family history of military service ==
Two of Face's great-grandfathers served as officers in the service of Virginia during the American Revolution. His paternal grandfather, William Face, was the son of Capt. Edward Face (born in 1724). In 1781, Capt. Edward Face and four hands serving on his sloop John spent 70 days "for the use of the troops at the Seege of York Town under the Command of his Excellency Gen'l Washington." William H. Face's paternal grandmother, Elizabeth Haley Face (William Face's wife), was the daughter of Capt. Samuel Haley of the Virginia Navy, who commanded Hornet and Mayflower during the Revolution.

William H. Face was the son of Edward Face (1808–1838) and Catherine Heffley Face (1805–1876).

Edward Face was the chief carpenter at Fortress Monroe while 1st Lieutenant Robert E. Lee was stationed there (1831–34). Lee played a major role in the final construction of both Fortress Monroe and its opposite, Fort Calhoun, later renamed Fort Wool. Both forts would later provide great vantage points for the Battle of Hampton Roads but neither played an important part in the action.

Later in the 1830s, Edward Face was sent by the Federal government to Chattahoochee, Florida to build an arsenal for the protection of the ammunition there. Construction of the arsenal began in 1834 and was completed in 1839, by which time it was an impressive walled compound with two external powder magazines. The Apalachicola Arsenal was used as an arms depot during the Second Seminole Indian War (1835-1842).

William H. Face married Sarah E. Dunbar on April 10, 1850. His brother, Edward Webster Face (1829–1907), Private, Company H, 54th Virginia Militia, CSA, married Sarah Dunbar's sister, Elizabeth Widgeon Dunbar (1831–1913) on March 27, 1851. The brothers, their wives and many of their descendants are buried in Elmwood Cemetery (Norfolk, Virginia).

A cousin, Sgt. Samuel T. Face, Longstreet's Command, Semmes' Brigade, McLaws' Division, 32nd Virginia Infantry, CSA (1843–1862), was killed on the bloodiest day of the American Civil War, September 17, 1862, the second day of the Battle of Sharpsburg (Antietam) and was buried near the battlefield.

== Sources ==
- Virginia Pilot Association archives
- Newport News, Va. Daily Press archives
- Coski, John M., Capital Navy: The Men, Ships and Operations of the James River Squadron, (1996), Campbell, CA: Savas Woodbury Publishers
- "The Home Bulletin" of the Hampton, Va. Soldiers Home, July 10, 1886
