= CSS Teaser =

US Civil War ship

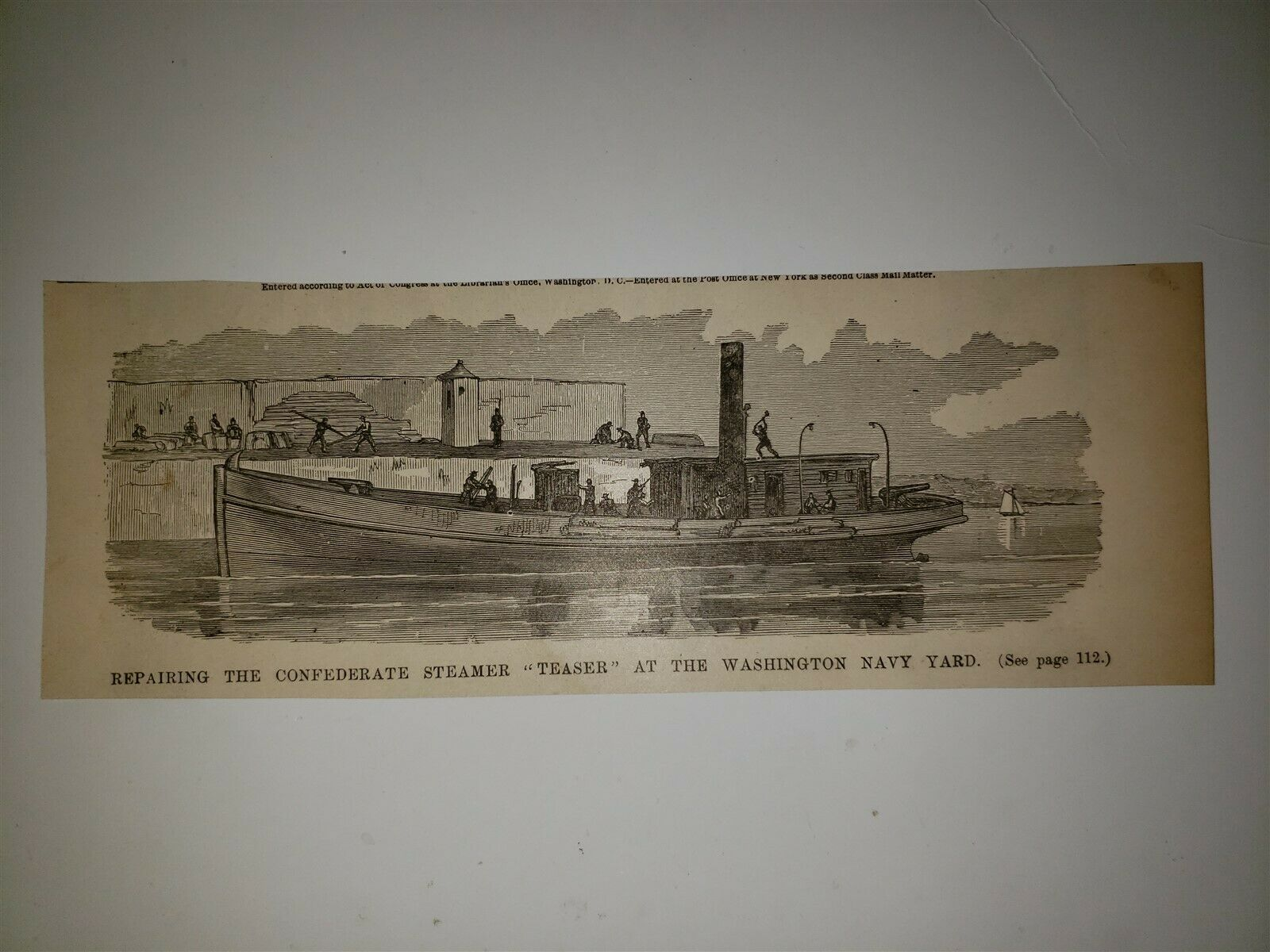
- The Teaser on repairs after capture.

History

Confederate States
- Name: Teaser
- Operator: Confederate States Navy
- Commissioned: 1861
- Fate: Captured 4 July 1862

United States
- Name: Teaser
- Operator: Union Navy
- Acquired: 4 July 1862
- Commissioned: 1862
- Decommissioned: 2 June 1865
- Fate: Sold into merchant service at auction 25 June 1865

General characteristics
- Displacement: 64 tons
- Length: 80 ft (24 m)
- Beam: 18 ft (5.5 m)
- Propulsion: Steam engine
- Complement: 25 officers and men
- Armament: 1 × 32-pounder rifled cannon; 1 × 12-pounder rifled cannon

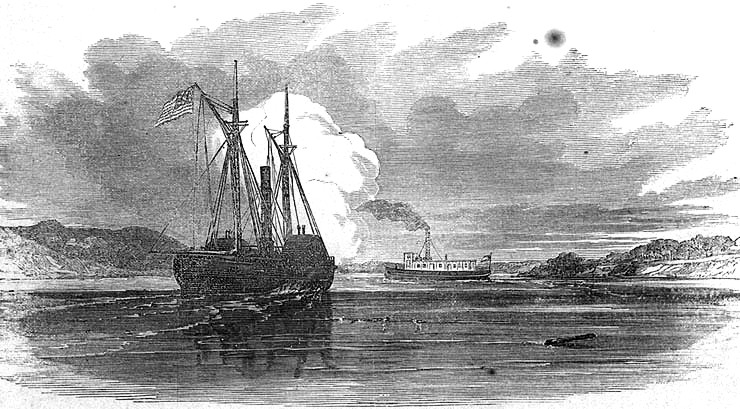
CSS Teaser in combat with USS Maratanza, July 4, 1862.

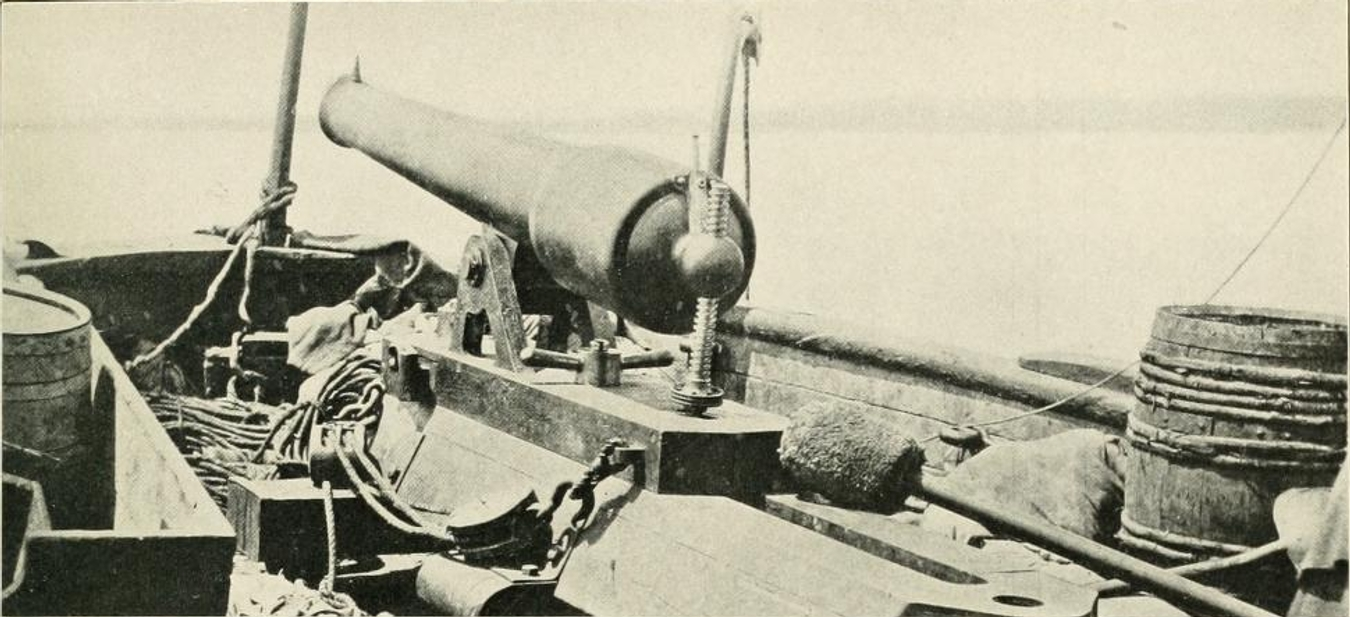
12-pounder on the bow

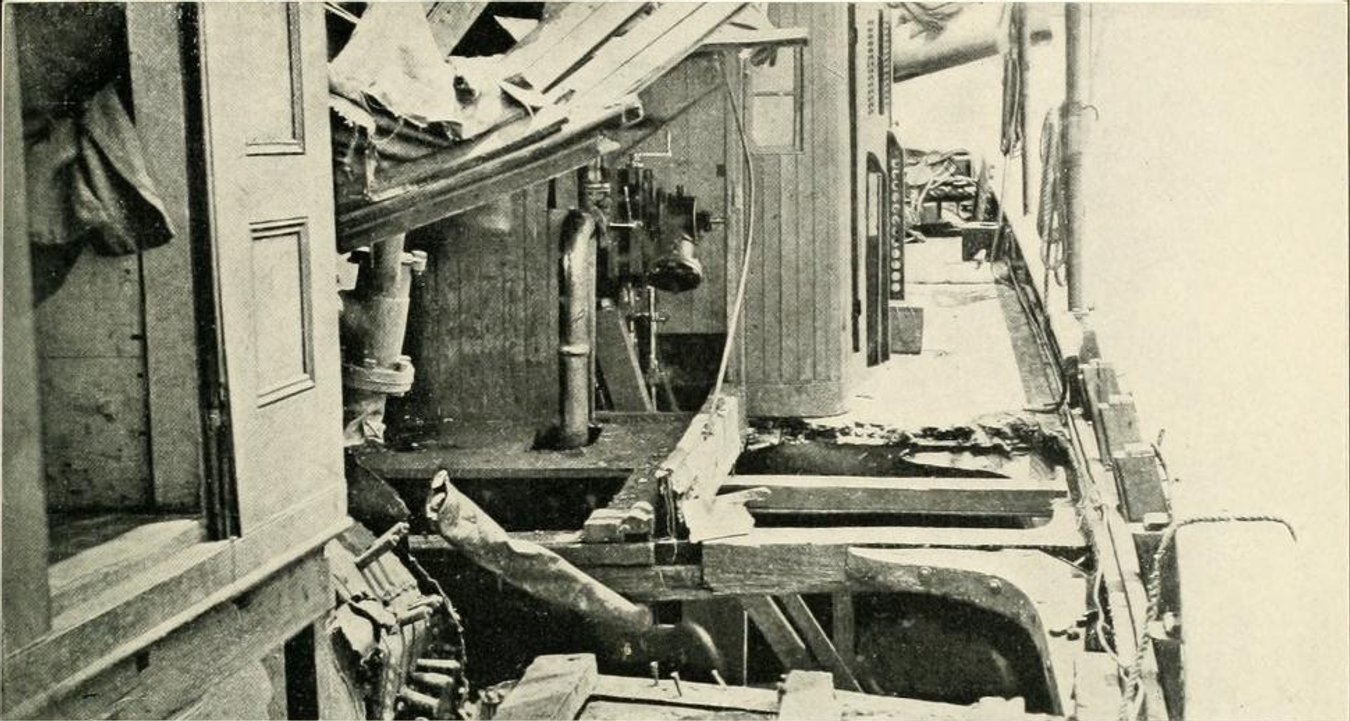
Deck detail

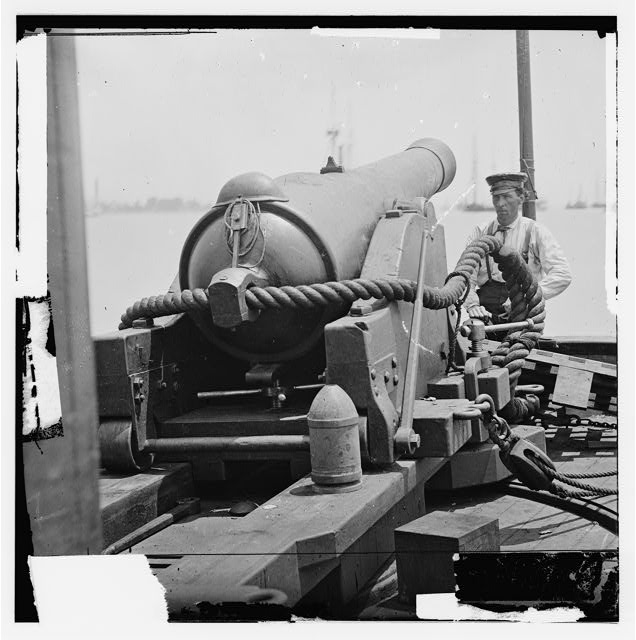
6.4-inch banded rifle, the stern pivot mount on the CSS Teaser. These guns were made by banding and rifling the 32-pounder smoothbore. This image is from the Library of Congress.

CSS Teaser had been the aging Georgetown, D.C. tugboat York River until the beginning of the American Civil War, when she was taken into the Confederate States Navy and took part in the famous Battle of Hampton Roads. Later, she was captured by the United States Navy and became the first USS Teaser.

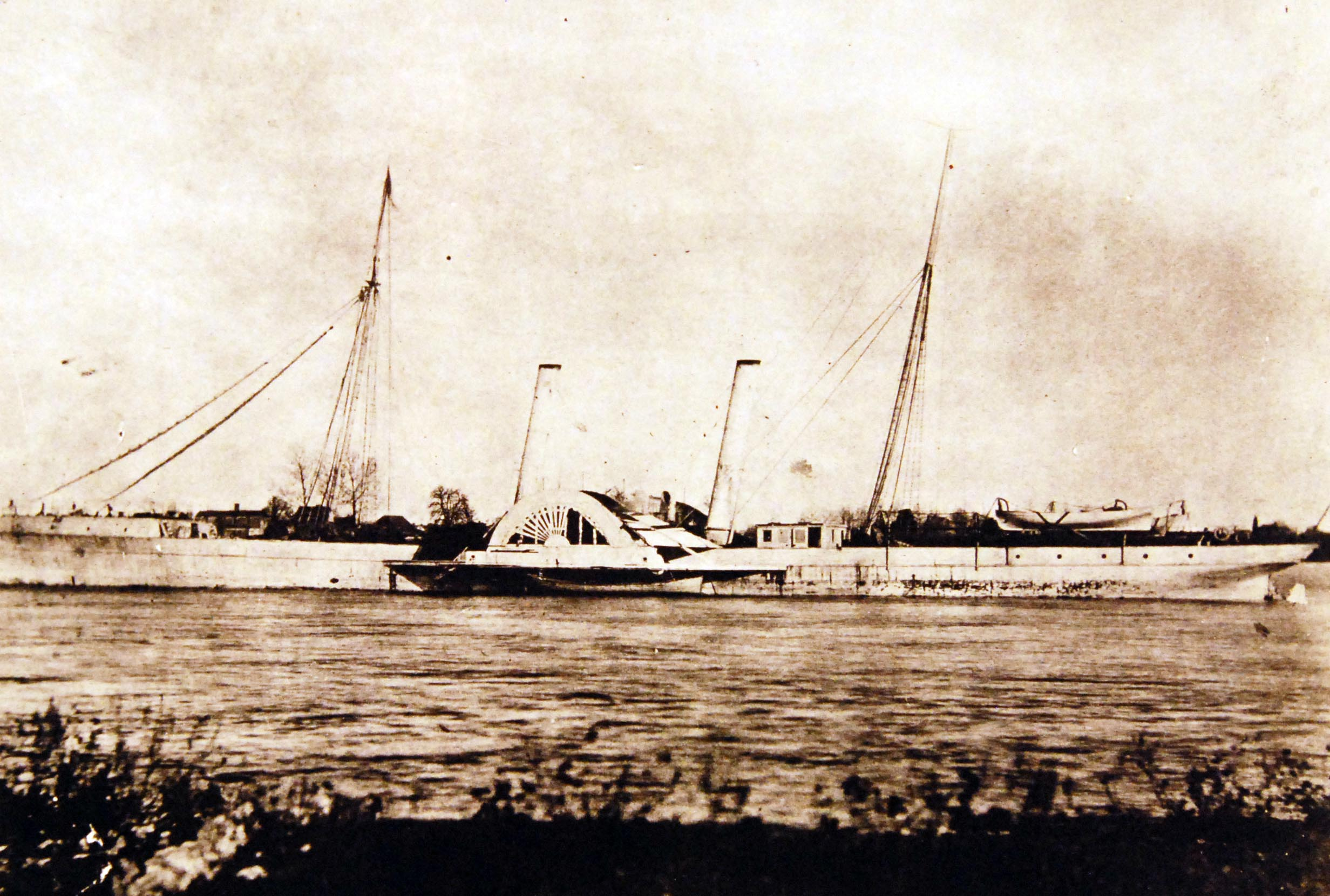
The CSS Robert E. Lee in the image is confused as the CSS Teaser.

== CSS Teaser ==
Teaser was built at Philadelphia, Pennsylvania. Purchased at Richmond, Virginia, by the State of Virginia in 1861, she was assigned to the naval forces in the James River with Lieutenant James Henry Rochelle, Virginia State Navy, in command. Upon the secession of Virginia, Teaser became a part of the Confederate States Navy and continued to operate in Virginia waters. With Lieutenant William A. Webb, CSN, in command, she took an active part in the Battle of Hampton Roads on March 8–March 9, 1862, acting as tender to CSS Virginia. She received the thanks of the Congress of the Confederate States for this action.

Teaser was a pioneer "aircraft carrier", serving as a base for an observation gas-filled balloon; she also became a pioneer minelayer when ordered on June 17, 1862, to assist General Robert E. Lee's Army of Northern Virginia. Under Lieutenant Hunter Davidson, CSN, she was used by the Confederate Naval Submarine Battery Service to plant and service "torpedoes" (mines) in the James River. While engaging USS Maratanza at Haxall's on the James on July 4, 1862, a Union shell blew up Teaser's boiler and forced her crew to abandon ship. When seized by Maratanza, Teaser was carrying on board a balloon for aerial reconnaissance of Union positions at City Point and Harrison's Landing.

=== Commanders ===
The commanders of the CSS Teaser were:

- Lieutenant James H. Rochelle (May–June 1861)
- Lieutenant Robert Randolph Carter (June–July 1861)
- Acting Master William H. Face (June 1861 – January 1862)
- Lieutenant William A. Webb (February 1862 –)
- Lieutenant Hunter Davidson (June–July 1862)

== USS Teaser ==
Later that summer, Teaser was taken into the United States Navy and was assigned to the Potomac Flotilla. With the exception of three brief deployments elsewhere, USS Teaser plied the waters of the Potomac River from Alexandria, Virginia, south to Point Lookout, Maryland, to enforce the blockade by interdicting a thriving trade in contraband between the Maryland and Virginia shores.

On September 22, she captured schooner Southerner in the Coan River. On October 19, while operating in the vicinity of Piney Point in St. Mary's County, Maryland, she captured two smugglers and their boat as they were nearing the exit of Herring Creek and preparing to cross the river to Virginia. On November 2, near the mouth of the Rappahannock River, the tug surprised three men attempting to violate the blockade in a canoe. Teaser took them prisoner and turned their contraband over to pro-Union Virginians living on Gwynn's Island. Four days later in Chesapeake Bay, Teaser took the cargo-less sloop Grapeshot and captured her three-man crew.

By December 1862, she had moved to the Rappahannock River with other units of the Potomac Flotilla to support General Ambrose Burnside's thrust toward Richmond. On December 10, she exchanged shots with a Confederate battery located on the southern shore of the river about three miles below Port Royal, Virginia. After Burnside's bloody rebuff at Fredericksburg, Virginia, on December 13, Teaser and her colleagues returned to their anti-smuggling patrol along the Potomac.

Teaser joined USS Primrose to make March 1863 an active month. On March 24, the two ships sent a boat expedition to reconnoiter Pope's Creek, Virginia. The landing party found two boats used for smuggling and collected information from Union sympathizers in the area. Almost a week later, on the night of March 30—March 31, they dispatched a three-boat party to Monroe's Creek, Virginia. The previous day, a Federal cavalry detachment had surprised a smuggler in the area; and, though the troops captured his goods, the man himself escaped. Boats from Teaser and Primrose succeeded where the Union horsemen had failed, and they gathered some intelligence on other contrabanders as well.

In April 1863, Teaser left the Potomac for duty with Acting Rear Admiral Samuel Phillips Lee's North Atlantic Blockading Squadron at Hampton Roads. On April 17, she joined USS Alert and USS Coeur de Lion in an expedition up the Nansemond River west of Norfolk, Virginia. However, she ran aground, damaged her machinery, and had to retire from the venture.

By mid-summer, Teaser was back in action on the Potomac. On the night of July 27, she captured two smugglers with a boatload of tobacco in the mouth of the Mattawoman Creek just south of Indian Head, Maryland. She destroyed the boat and sent the prisoners and contraband north to the Washington Navy Yard. During the night of October 7, Teaser and another flotilla ship (extant records do not identify her companion) noticed signalling between Mathias Point, Virginia, and the Maryland shore. The two ships shelled the woods at Mathias Point, but took no action against the signallers on the Maryland shore other than to urge upon the United States Army's district provost marshal the necessity of constant vigilance.

On January 5, 1864, Teaser and USS Yankee landed a force of men at Nomini, Virginia, to investigate a rumor that the Southerners had hidden a large lighter and a skiff capable of boating 80 men there. The force, commanded by Teaser's commanding officer, Acting Ensign Sheridan, found both boats, destroyed the lighter, and captured the skiff. During the landing, Confederate soldiers appeared on the heights above Nomini, but the gunboats dampened their curiosity with some well-placed cannon shots.

In April, Teaser, Yankee, USS Anacostia, USS Fuchsia, and USS Resolute accompanied an Army expedition to Machodoc Creek, Virginia. At 5:00 A.M. on April 13, the five ships cleared the St. Mary's River in company with the Army's steamer USAT Long Branch with a battalion of soldiers under the command of General Edward W. Hinks. Long Branch landed her troops at about 8:00 A.M. while the five ships covered the operation. A contingent of Confederate cavalry appeared on the southern bank of the Machodoc, but retired when Teaser and Anacostia sent four armed boat crews ashore. The landing party netted a prisoner, probably a smuggler, and a large quantity of tobacco. By April 14, General Hinks' troops reembarked in Long Branch and headed for Point Lookout. Anacostia accompanied the Army steamer while the other four warships investigated Currioman Bay and Nomini. They returned to St. Mary's, Virginia, that afternoon to resume patrols.

During the summer of 1864, Teaser was called upon to leave the Potomac once more. On this occasion, the Union forces needed her guns to help defend strategic bridges across the rivers at the head of Chesapeake Bay near Baltimore, Maryland, against Lieutenant General Jubal A. Early's raiders. On July 10, she departed the lower Potomac, rounded Point Lookout, and headed up the Chesapeake Bay. That night, she had to put into the Patuxent River because of heavy winds and leaks in her hull. Before dawn the following morning, she continued up the bay. During the forenoon, the leaks became progressively worse and, by the time she arrived off Annapolis, Maryland, she had to remove her exhaust pipe for temporary repairs. Early that evening, Teaser reached Baltimore where she put in for additional repairs.

The gunboat did not reach her destination, the bridge over the Gunpowder River, until late on July 12. She was too late; the bridge had already been burned. She returned to Baltimore immediately to report on the bridge and to pick up arms and provisions for the vessels stationed in the Gunpowder River. When she arrived back at the bridge, she found orders to return to the Potomac awaiting her. Teaser departed the northern reaches of the Chesapeake and reported back to the Potomac Flotilla at St. Inigoes, Virginia, on the St. Mary's River in late afternoon on April 14.

For the remainder of the war, Teaser and her flotilla-mates plied the Potomac and contributed to the gradual economic strangulation which brought the South to its knees by April 1865. Less than two months after General Robert E. Lee's surrender at Appomattox, Virginia, Teaser was decommissioned at the Washington Navy Yard on June 2. Sold at public auction at Washington to Mr. J. Bigler on June 25, the tug was re-documented as York River on July 2, 1865, and she served commercially until 1878.

== See also ==
- Ships captured in the American Civil War
- Bibliography of American Civil War naval history
- Union Navy
