= Hunter Davidson =

Naval officer and engineer

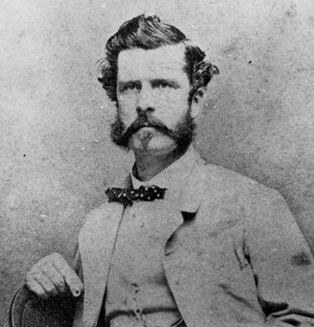
- Portrait circa 1866
- Born: September 20, 1826; Georgetown, Washington, D.C., U.S.
- Died: February 16, 1913 (aged 86); Paraguay, South America
- Resting place: Municipal Cemetery Pirayú; Paraguay, South America
- Education: United States Naval Academy
- Occupation: Naval officer
- Military career
- Allegiance: United States of America; Confederate States of America; Argentina
- Branch: United States Navy; Confederate States Navy; Argentine Navy
- Service years: 1847–1861 (USN); 1861–1865 (CSN); 1876–1884 (ARA)
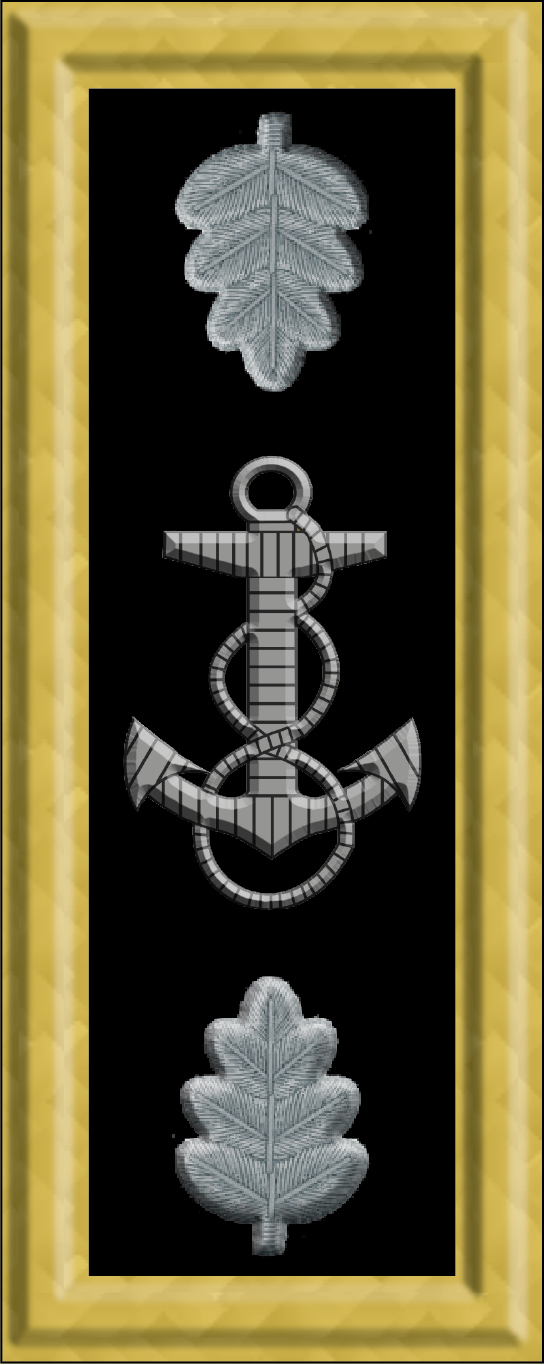
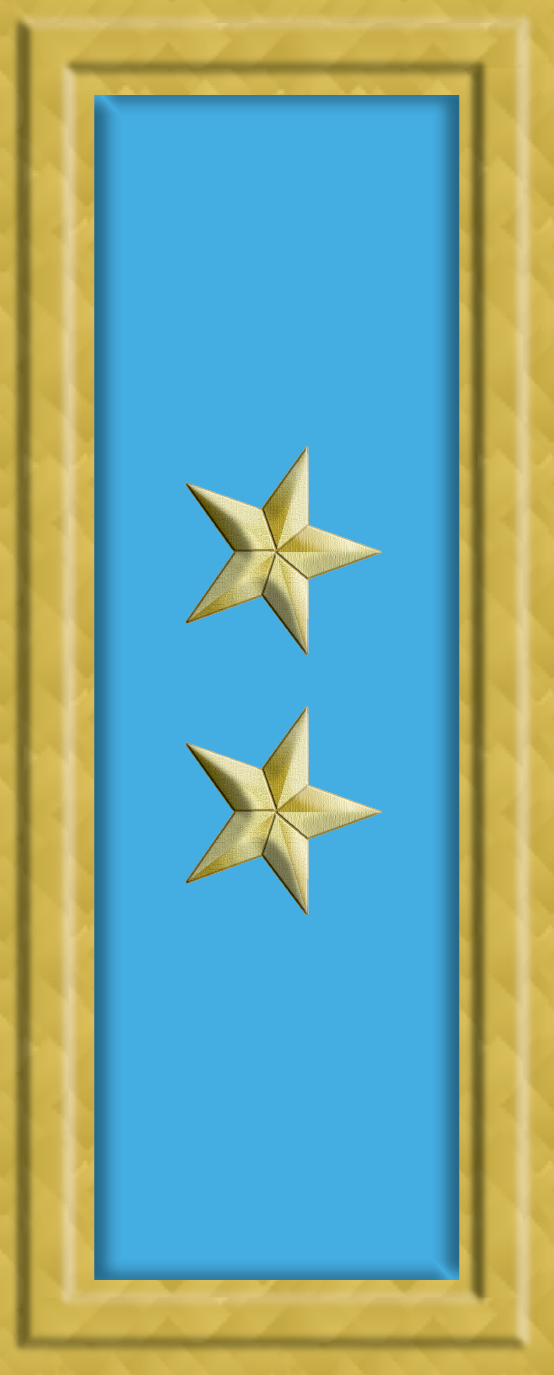
- Rank: Commander (USN) Commander (CSN)

Hunter Davidson (September 20, 1826 – February 16, 1913) was an American engineer, inventor, and naval officer, first serving the United States and then joining the Confederacy during the American Civil War. He later served as the first commander of the Maryland Oyster Police Force during the height of the Oyster Wars.

== Early life and family ==
Davidson was born in Georgetown in 1826. He was the son of William B. Davidson, an artillery officer in the United States Army, and Elizabeth Chapman Hunter. Davidson was twice married and had seven children. His older brother was Union Army brigadier general John Wynn Davidson. In 1847, he graduated from the United States Naval Academy.

== Military service ==
=== United States Navy ===
After graduating from the Naval Academy, Davidson was stationed aboard the USS Portsmouth during the Mexican–American War. During the 1850s, Davidson was stationed on the USS Dale as part of the Africa Squadron and Atlantic Anti-Slavery Operations of the United States to suppress the slave trade. In the 1850s, Davidson was also assigned duty for several years with the Coast Survey, a predecessor of what became the National Oceanic and Atmospheric Administration.

Davidson was promoted to lieutenant in 1855, and was granted two patents for a lifeboat-lifting device. In 1856, Davidson was one of the officers selected to return the exploration vessel HMS Resolute to Queen Victoria and the Royal Navy.

Davidson was an instructor at the Naval Academy from 1858 to 1861 prior to the outbreak of the American Civil War.

=== American Civil War (Confederate Navy) ===
Davidson was commissioned as a lieutenant in the Confederate States Navy during the American Civil War. He was stationed on the CSS Virginia as a gunnery officer during the Battle of Hampton Roads of 1862. In June and July 1862, Davidson was commander of the CSS Teaser, used by the Confederate Naval Submarine Battery Service to plant and service "torpedoes" (Naval mines) in the James River.

Davidson later served as commander of the Submarine Battery Service, also referred to as the "Torpedo Bureau," a branch of the Confederate Secret Service. He was credited for his work in operationalizing the electric detonation of mines.

== Later life ==
After his service for the Confederacy, Davidson was ineligible for further military service in the United States after the Civil War had ended. In 1865 he briefly served as a merchant officer in the United Kingdom.

=== Maryland Oyster Navy ===
In 1868 during the early period of the Oyster Wars in Maryland, Davidson was unanimously appointed as the first commander of the Maryland Oyster Police Force, which was nicknamed as the "Oyster Navy." Davidson acquired a 12-pounder Dahlgren howitzer for the force's first steamer, Leila, for use in the gun battles between the police force and the illegal oyster dredgers.

The organization was tasked with enforcing the state's oyster-harvesting laws and served as the predecessor of the modern Maryland Natural Resources Police. In 1870, as part of his role, Davidson delivered a report to the Maryland General Assembly which made recommendations regarding oyster management issues, protecting oyster habitats, and regulating the harvesting of oysters in the state.

In 1871, Davidson thwarted an assassination plot against him by a pirating oysterman named Gus Rice. Davidson served in the role until 1872.

=== South America ===
After leaving his post with the Oyster Navy, Davidson relocated to South America where he founded and was the first chief of the Argentine Navy’s Torpedo Division. In the role, he conducted the first detailed hydrographic surveys of Argentine waterways, including the Bahia Blanca Estuary and Iguazu River. In 1874, he designed a 620-ton steamer, Fulminante, for the country's Minister of War (and previous Vice President), Adolfo Alsina. He retired to Paraguay in 1885.

== Death and burial ==
Davidson died on February 16, 1913, in Paraguay, South America, at the age of 86.

== Works ==
- "Electrical Torpedoes as a System of Defence," in the Southern Historical Society Papers. Volume 2, July 1876
