= Nomini, Virginia =

Unincorporated community in Virginia, US

Coordinates: 38°05′54″N 76°44′16″W

Nomini is an unincorporated community in Westmoreland County, in the U. S. state of Virginia.

Nomini is a name derived from a Native American language meaning "deep current".

The name Nomini refers to the Native American village of Onawmanient and its surrounding land which was located along the left bank of current day Nomini Creek. Onawmanient was the center of the Matchotic chiefdom.
