= North Carolina Baptist Assembly =

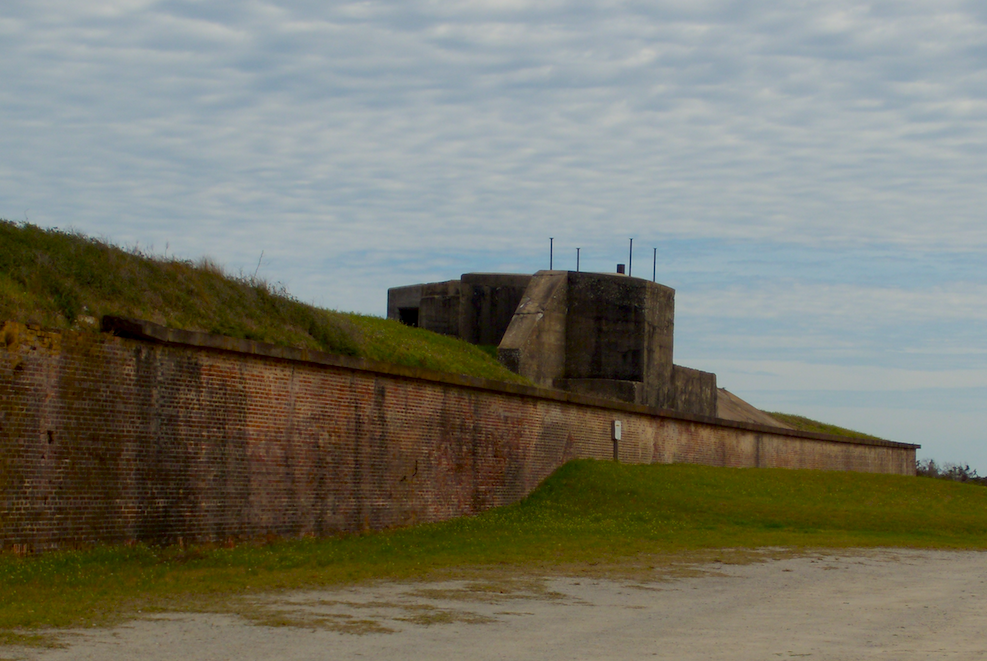
Fort Caswell

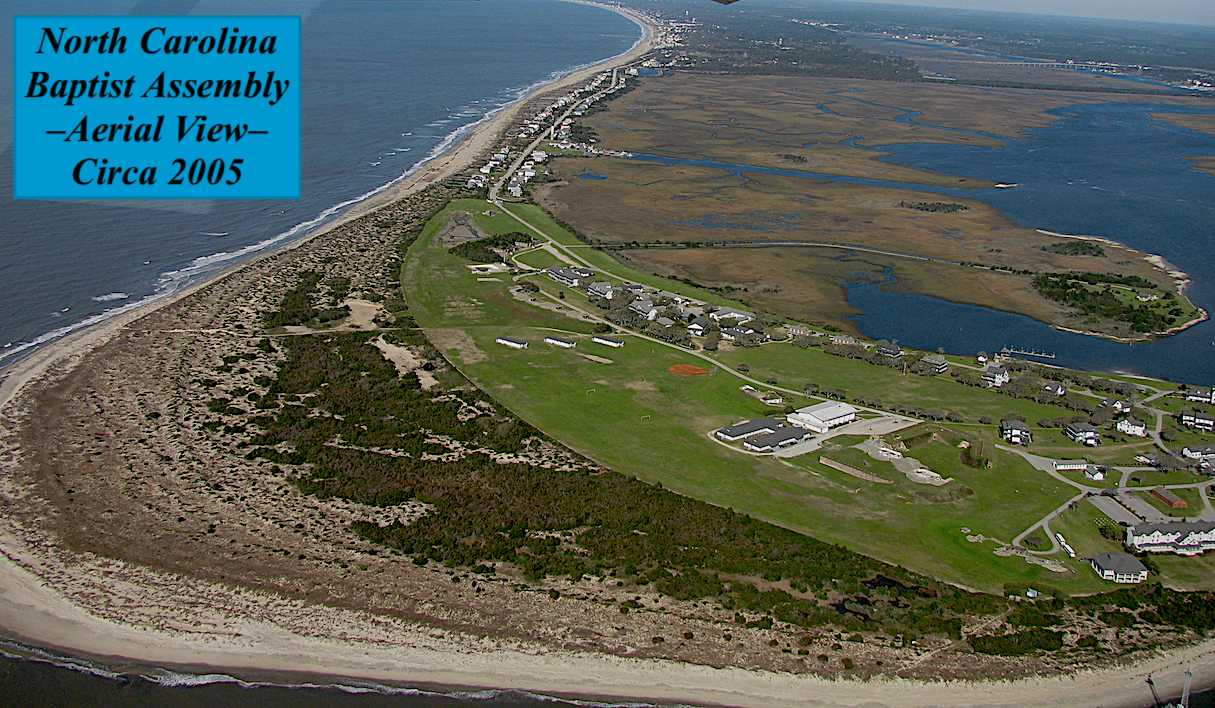
NC Baptist Assembly

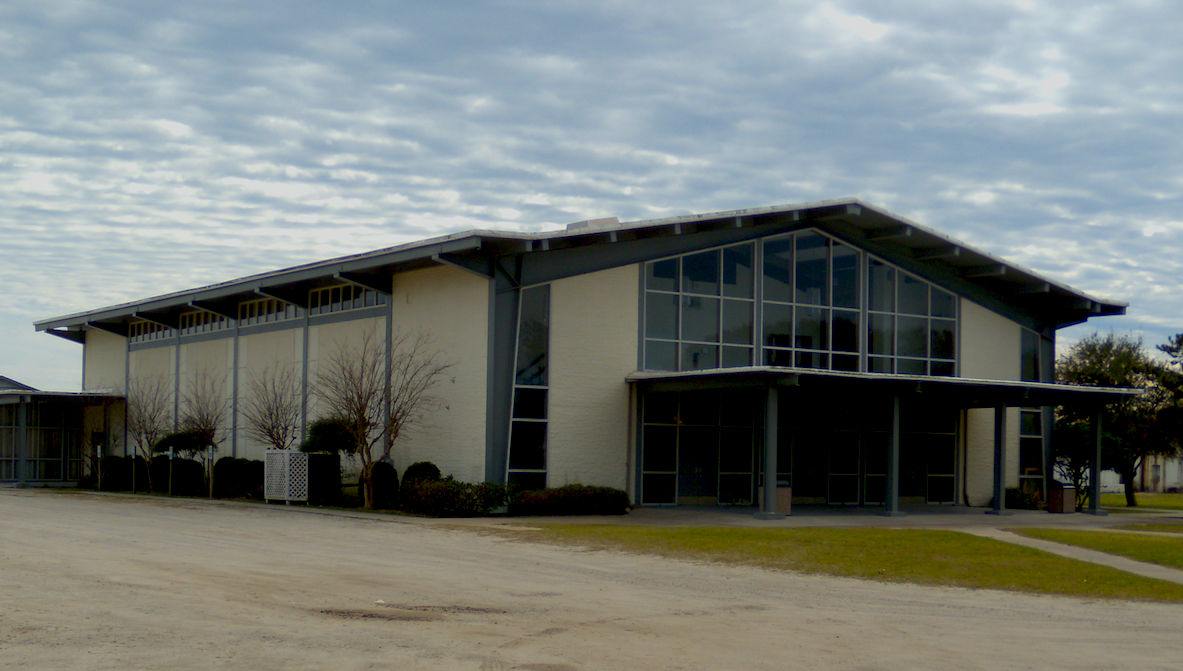
Hatch Auditorium

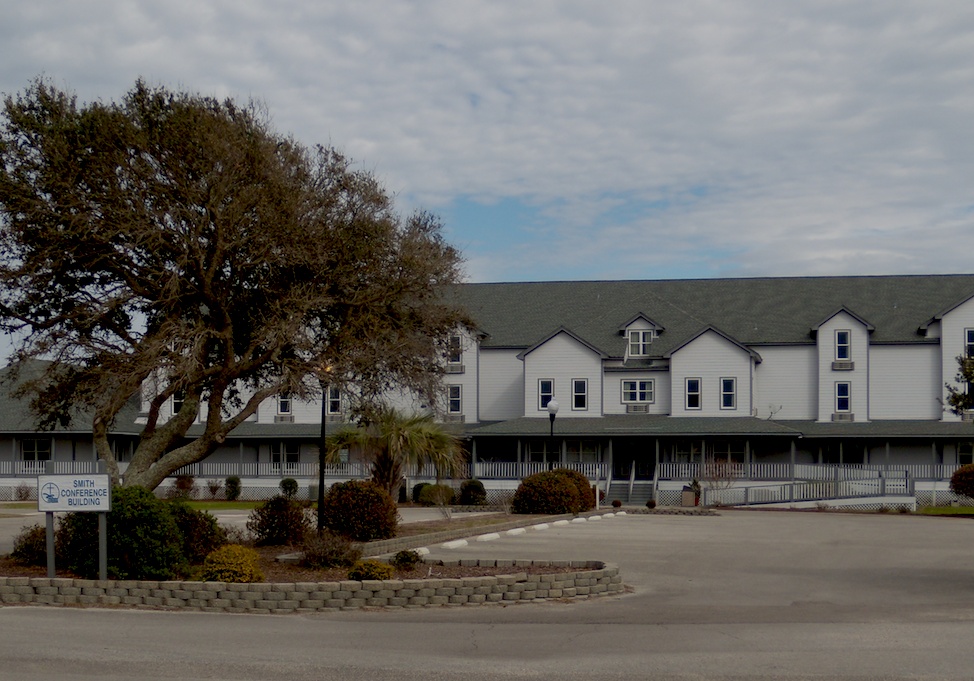
Smith Conference Center

The North Carolina Baptist Assembly is a Christian retreat owned and operated by the Baptist State Convention of North Carolina, the state's largest denomination. The grounds of the retreat, located adjacent to Caswell Beach on the eastern end of Oak Island, is the former site of Fort Caswell, a military base that was occupied by various branches of the U.S. armed forces for most of the period between 1836 and 1945. Most people still refer to the Baptist Assembly as Fort Caswell.

Sandwiched between the Atlantic Ocean and the Intracoastal Waterway (ICW), the assembly is about 35 miles south of Wilmington and roughly 70 miles north of Myrtle Beach, South Carolina. Located just across the ICW is the city of Southport (pop. 3,700) whose historic houses and buildings include Fort Johnston, the North Carolina Maritime Museum at Southport, and year-round ferry service across the Cape Fear River to the NC Aquarium and Civil War battleground site at Fort Fisher.

The 250-acre (1.0 km^{2}) property was abandoned by the Navy after World War II and in 1949 was purchased by the Baptist State Convention of North Carolina as surplus property for US$86,000 (equivalent to $1,136,523 in 2024). It is now used as a year-round coastal retreat and conference center for churches, associations, agencies, and other affiliates of the Baptist State Convention. One of the facility's main purposes has been to serve as a camp for the youth of North Carolina's Baptist churches, especially during the summer months. Because of the influx of visitors during summer youth weeks, young adults and college students are hired to live and work at the assembly; they are known as the summer staff. Many of the current full-time employees and administration started out as summer staff in years past.

The facilities, which include housing and program buildings such as Hatch Auditorium which hosts the Civil War Roundtable and the Smith Conference Center, are also used by non-Baptist church and educational groups. It can accommodate over 1,000 people at a time, and still occasionally houses military personnel stationed at the Sunny Point Military Ocean Terminal, a military port north of nearby Southport, during conflicts such as Operation Desert Storm.
