= USS Cimarron (1862) =

Gunboat of the United States Navy

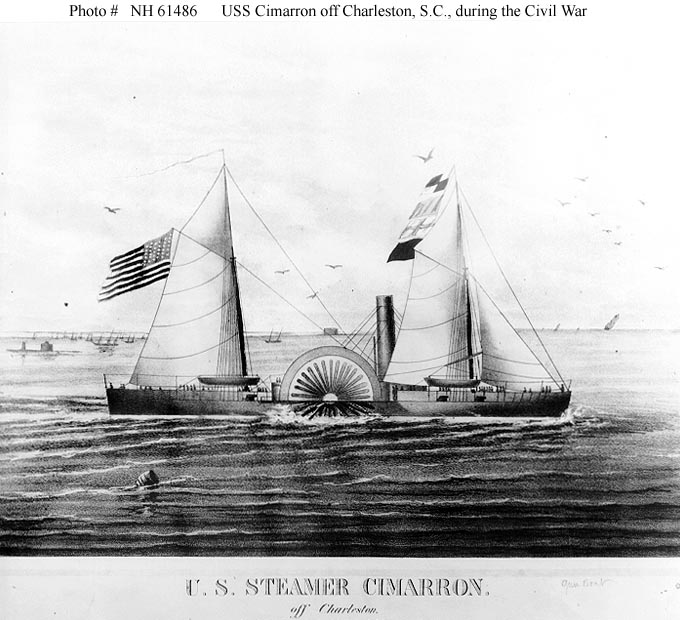
- USS Cimarron (1862-1865) Contemporary lithograph, depicting her off Charleston, South Carolina, during the Civil War.

History

United States
- Name: USS Cimarron
- Laid down: date unknown
- Launched: 16 March 1862; at Bordentown, New Jersey
- Commissioned: 5 July 1862
- Decommissioned: 17 August 1865 at Philadelphia
- Stricken: 1865 (est.)
- Fate: Sold, 6 November 1865

General characteristics
- Displacement: 860 ton
- Length: 205 ft (62 m)
- Beam: 35 ft (11 m)
- Draught: 9 ft (2.7 m)
- Propulsion: steam engine; side wheel-propelled; double ended
- Speed: 10 knots
- Complement: not known
- Armament: one 100-pounder rifle; one 9-inch smoothbore gun; six 24-pounder howitzers

The first USS Cimarron (officially changed from the original spelling Cimerone) was a sidewheel double-ended steam gunboat of the United States Navy that served during the American Civil War.

Cimarron, a large ship of 860 tons, was outfitted as a gunboat with six howitzers for riverside operations, and as a blockade interceptor gunboat with a powerful 100-pounder rifle.

== Launched in New Jersey in 1862 ==
Cimarron was launched 16 March 1862 by D. S. Merschon, Bordentown, New Jersey; outfitted at Philadelphia Navy Yard; and commissioned 5 July 1862, Commander Maxwell Woodhull in command.

== Civil War service ==
=== James River operations ===
Sailing from the Philadelphia Navy Yard 11 July 1862, Cimarron arrived at Fort Monroe, Virginia, 8 July. Between 11 July and 4 September 1862, she sailed in the James River in active support of Army operations. During this time she engaged Confederate troops at Harrison's Landing (28 July) and exchanged fire with Fort Powhatan (31 July) and Swan Point Battery (4 August).

=== Assigned to the South Atlantic blockade ===
Cimarron cleared Fort Monroe, 7 September 1862 to join the South Atlantic Blockading Squadron at Port Royal, South Carolina, 13 September. She was constantly employed in the coastal and inland waters of South Carolina, Georgia, and Florida, participating in the engagement with Confederate batteries up the St. Johns River, Florida (17 September 1862), and returning early in October to support army operations there during the battle of St. John's Bluff.

After repairs at the Philadelphia Navy Yard from January to April 1863, Cimarron continued blockade duty until 3 August 1865. During this time she captured three prizes, and fired on Confederate troops ashore on two occasions (23 June and 8 July 1863). She also joined in the attacks on Fort Wagner in Charleston Harbor, (17 August, 20 August and 21 August 1863). During January and February 1864, Cimarron operated in the Stono River, South Carolina.

== Post-war decommissioning ==
Cimarron arrived at Philadelphia Navy Yard 8 August 1865; was decommissioned there 17 August 1865; and sold 6 November 1865.

== See also ==
- Union Navy
- Confederate States Navy
