= Vinton (surname) =

Vinton is the surname of:

- Arthur Dudley Vinton (1852–1906), American author, lawyer and inventor
- Alexander Hamilton Vinton (1852-1911), American Episcopal bishop
- Annie E. Vinton (1869–1961), American politician
- Bill Vinton (1865–1893), American Major League Baseball pitcher
- Bobby Vinton (born 1935), American pop singer
- Calista Vinton (1807–1864), American Baptist missionary for 30 years in Burma (now Myanmar), wife of Justus Vinton
- David Vinton (1774–1833), American silversmith, merchant and Masonic lecturer
- Francis Vinton (1809–1872), American clergyman, soldier, engineer, lawyer and writer
- Francis Laurens Vinton (1835–1879), Union Army brigadier general in the American Civil War
- Frederic Porter Vinton (1846−1911), American painter
- Iris Vinton (1905–1988), American writer of children's books
- Justus Vinton (1806–1858), American Baptist missionary for 25 years in Burma
- Samuel F. Vinton (1792–1862), American politician
- Sue Vinton (born 1956), American politician
- Susan Vinton (born 1953), American former tennis player
- Warren H. Vinton (1825–1907). American politician
- Will Vinton (1947−2018), American director and producer of animated films
- William T. Vinton (1865–1945), American politician and lawyer
