= Arthur Dudley Vinton =

American novelist

Arthur Dudley Vinton (December 23, 1852 – September 12, 1906) was an author and lawyer.

== Early life ==
Dudley Vinton, as he was called, was born in Brooklyn, New York, on December 23, 1852. He was the third son of the Reverend Dr. Francis Vinton (1809–1872) and his second wife, Elizabeth Mason (née Perry) Vinton (1819–1878). His father, who was previously married to Maria Bowen Whipple, was a well-known pastor affiliated with Trinity Church in Newport and Trinity Church in lower Manhattan.

His maternal grandparents were Elizabeth Champlin (née Mason) Perry and Commodore Oliver Hazard Perry, who was known as "The Hero of Lake Erie". His paternal grandparents were Mary (née Atwell) Vinton and David Vinton. His paternal aunt, Elizabeth Vinton, was married to Union Army Gen. George S. Greene and was the father of Francis Vinton Greene. His paternal uncle, David Hammond Vinton, served as a brevet major general in the U.S. Army.

Arthur Vinton attended the Brooklyn Polytechnic Institute then joined the United States Navy and became a Col. A.D.V. Midshipman before attending college. He graduated from Columbia Law School.

== Career ==
After graduation from law school, Vinton worked at Evarts, Southmayd & Choate, before starting a law firm in 1879 with two wealthy classmates, his cousin, Perry Belmont, and George Griswold Frelinghuysen. The firm of Vinton, Belmont & Frelinghuysen lasted about five years. Belmont was elected to the House of Representatives and Frelinghuysen married into the Ballantine family and soon became president of the Ballantine Brewing company.

When his friend Lloyd Bryce, whom he met at Columbia Law, became the editor of the North American Review in 1889, Vinton abandoned the law and began working there and contributing. He also invented an automatic railway signal.

== Personal life ==
Vinton died in Manhattan on September 12, 1906. After a funeral service at Belmont Chapel, he was buried at Island Cemetery in Newport, Rhode Island.

== Published works ==
- The Pomfret Mystery: A Novel of Incident (1886)
- The Unpardonable Sin (1889)
- Looking Further Backward (1890), a derisory sequel to Edward Bellamy's novel Looking Backward.
