= Jacob Brown (general) =

18/19th-century American army officer

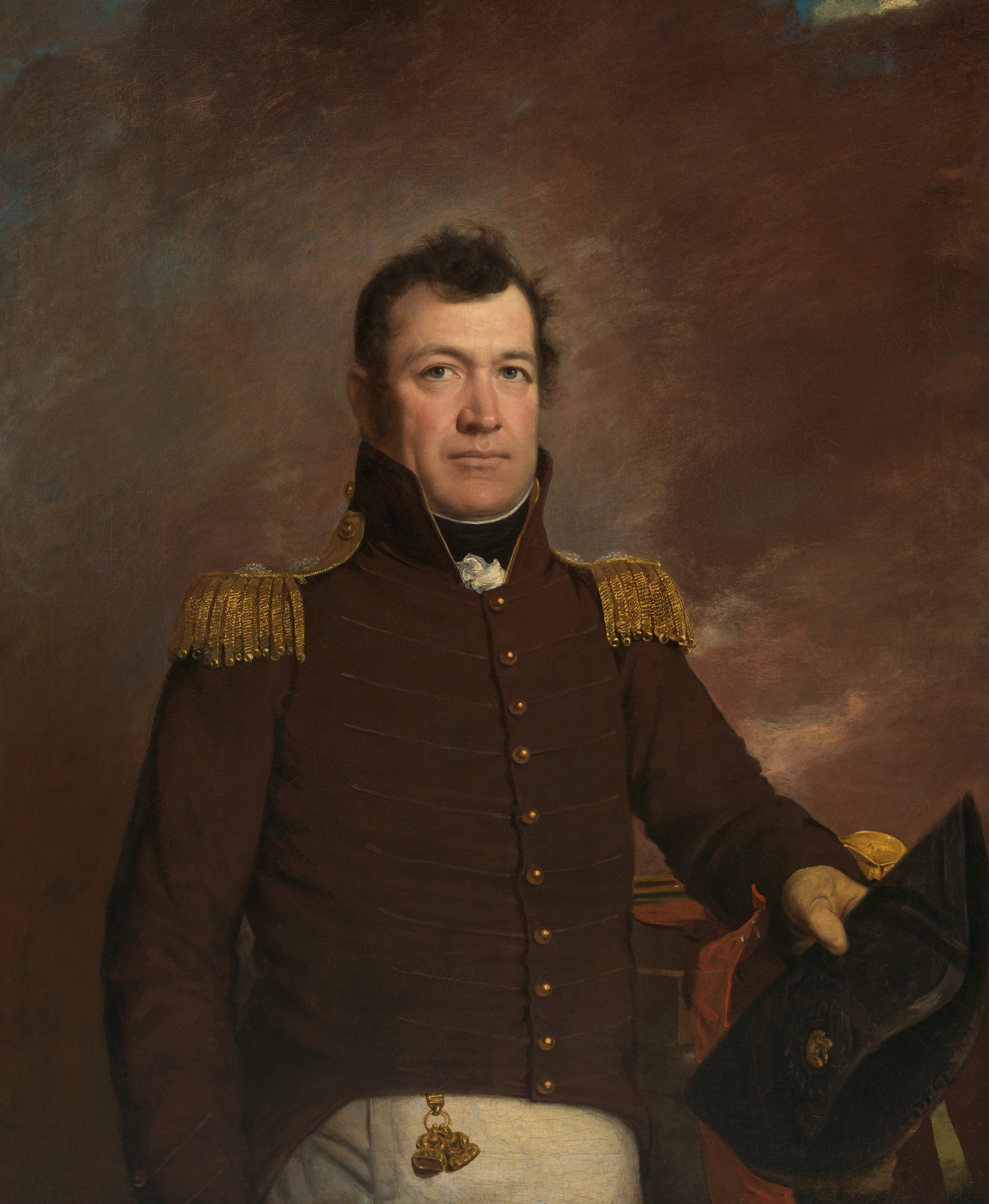
- Portrait by John Wesley Jarvis, c. 1815

Commanding General of the U.S. Army
- In office June, 1821 – 24 February 1828
- President: James Monroe; John Quincy Adams
- Preceded by: Himself as Senior Officer of the U.S. Army
- Succeeded by: Alexander Macomb

11th Senior Officer of the U.S. Army
- In office 15 June 1815 – June, 1821
- President: James Madison; James Monroe
- Preceded by: Henry Dearborn
- Succeeded by: Himself as Commanding General of the U.S. Army

Personal details
- Born: May 9, 1775 Bucks County, Pennsylvania, British America
- Died: February 24, 1828 (aged 52) Washington, D.C., U.S.
- Resting place: Congressional Cemetery
- Spouse: Pamelia Williams (m. 1802)
- Children: 9 including Nathan W. Brown
- Parents: Samuel Brown (Father); Abi White (Mother)
- Education: University of Pennsylvania
- Profession: Teacher; Soldier
- Awards: Congressional Gold Medal
- Nickname: "Potash Brown"

Military service
- Allegiance: United States
- Branch/service: New York Militia; United States Army
- Years of service: 1807–1813 (NY Militia); 1813–1828 (US Army)
- Rank: Major General
- Commands: Army of the Niagara
- Battles/wars: See battles: War of 1812; Raid on Gananoque; 1st Ogdensburg; Second Battle of Sacket's Harbor; Battle of Hoople's Creek; Battle of Crysler's Farm; Occupation of Cornwall; Salmon River Raid; Battle of Lacolle Mills; Capture of Fort Erie; Battle of Chippawa; Battle of Lundy's Lane (WIA); Siege of Fort Erie

Jacob Jennings Brown (May 9, 1775 – February 24, 1828) was an American army officer who served in the War of 1812, where he reached the rank of general. His successes on the northern border during that war made him a national hero, and he was awarded a Congressional Gold Medal.

Even as the US Army was reduced in size after the war, Brown retained commissioned status. In 1821, Brown was appointed Commanding General of the United States Army and held that post until his death. He initiated post-graduate education for staff and command officers, and the General Recruiting Service, to manage the acquisition of troops. After his death, he received a military funeral in Washington, D.C., with a mile-long parade along Pennsylvania Avenue to his burial at Congressional Cemetery.

== Early life ==
Born in Bucks County, Pennsylvania, Jacob Jennings Brown was the son of Samuel and Abi (White) Brown. His middle name was in honor of his paternal grandmother, a descendant of Samuel Jennings and his wife. Jennings had served as deputy governor of West Jersey and later receiver general of Pennsylvania in the early 18th century.

Raised a Quaker, Brown graduated from the University of Pennsylvania in 1790. He taught school for several years. In 1798, he moved to upstate New York, which was being settled and developed after the sale of thousands of acres of land formerly held by nations of the Iroquois Confederacy. Most had been forced to cede their lands and moved to a major reserve in Upper Canada.

Brown was a pioneer settler and landowner in the Black River country. He and his extended family established mills and a store, laid out roads and improved navigation on the lower Black River, which flowed into Lake Ontario.

== Military service ==
=== Apparent work for Alexander Hamilton ===
One biographer claimed Brown received early military training while serving as a military secretary to Alexander Hamilton during the winter of 1798–99. Hamilton was then organizing the U.S. Army for a possible war with France. But Hamilton's biographies say that he did not have a secretary, and biographical sketches of Brown published in 1815 do not mention a connection between him and Hamilton. As a major landowner, in 1807 Brown was commissioned as a captain in the 108th regiment of the New York Militia. Two years later, he was promoted to colonel. Militia officers, including Brown, served part-time and made their livings from farming and other occupations.

=== War of 1812 ===
The young American settlements along Lake Ontario had enjoyed a vigorous trade with Kingston and other Canadian sites before the United States imposed a boycott in 1808 on trade with Britain (and Canada) during rising tensions. Jacob Brown was nicknamed "Potash Brown" because of his activities as a smuggler of this product from Sackets Harbor, New York and along the Saint Lawrence River during this period. Sackets Harbor and other towns were the bases of widespread smuggling of goods with Canada.

During the War of 1812, Brown came to be characterized by his swift action and opportunism on the offensive. He also was known for directing meticulously planned, defensive field works, including for Sackets Harbor. His fortifications there were instrumental in fending off British and Canadian advances. Sackets Harbor had become a major military shipyard for the construction of American naval warships to sail on the Great Lakes, and its protection was critical. Some 3,000 shipyard workers were recruited to the shipyard, and thousands of federal troops were eventually bivouacked in the area. They overwhelmed the small town.

When the War of 1812 began, Brown was a brigadier general in the New York militia, having been appointed to that rank in 1811. Though he opposed the war, he organized defenses in the Great Lakes region. On May 29, 1813, troops led by Brown defeated the British at the Second Battle of Sacket's Harbor, based on his fortifications. As a result of his actions there, Brown was commissioned as a brigadier general in the regular army.

The next year, Brown showed his aggressiveness during the Niagara Campaign, beginning with the capture of Fort Erie on 3 July 1814 in Upper Canada after invasion by the Americans across the Niagara River. This was followed by the Battle of Chippawa on 5 July, when he achieved overwhelming success.

The following Battle of Lundy's Lane on 25 July 1814, resulted in such high casualties on both sides that it was considered one of the bloodiest engagements of the war. It resulted in a stalemate. Brown was wounded twice in this engagement. Brigadier General Winfield Scott was serving under him and believed that Brown's decision to refrain from fully committing his strength at the outset of this battle resulted in the destruction of Scott's brigade and a high number of unnecessary deaths.

Brown's last battle of the war was the related Siege of Fort Erie, from 4 Aug to 21 Sep 1814, when the British tried unsuccessfully to take back control of the fort. He had directed fortifications to improve defenses at Fort Erie, which contributed to the American success in defeating the British. Brown was also considered impetuous. After the initial British assault against his forces was repulsed, Brown ordered a sortie on September 17 against the British that resulted in more than 500 casualties on each side, but changed nothing in the outcome of the siege. After both sides withdrew, the Americans destroyed Fort Erie so that it could no longer be used. Overall, Brown's successes along the northern border made him a national hero.

=== Postwar years ===
After the war, the U.S. Army was reduced in size. By 1821, Brown was the only major general in the service, and President James Monroe made him commanding general. Despite a stroke suffered in 1821, Brown functioned well in his new post. He reorganized the army staff into the form it retained for the rest of the century. He advised the secretaries of war and presidents on military policy.

He also pushed to establish two post-graduate schools for the military, precursors of present-day staff and command colleges. Another first was his creation in 1822 of the General Recruiting Service; it was the first organization responsible for providing manpower for the Army.

== Death ==
On February 24, 1828, Brown died. He was given a military funeral: his casket was carried down Pennsylvania Avenue in the nation's capital by a detachment of U.S. Marines. The government shut down to mark the day of his funeral. The mile-long funeral procession was composed of family, military detachments, and government officials. He was buried in the Congressional Cemetery, Washington, D.C.

President John Quincy Adams said of him:

General Brown was one of the eminent men of this age and nation. Though bred a Quaker, he was a man of lofty and martial spirit, and in the late war contributed perhaps more than any man to redeem and establish the military character of his country.

== Family ==
In December 1802, Brown married Pamelia Williams, then seventeen. They had four sons (Gouverneur, Jacob, William, and Nathan) and five daughters (Mary, Eliza, Pamela, Margaret and Katherine). Nathan was the only son to survive into a full adult life.

Brown's firstborn son, Gouverneur, drowned in an ice-skating accident at the age of twelve. Jacob (class of 1832) and William Spencer Brown (class of 1835) graduated from West Point. Jacob resigned after four years' service in the army, and William resigned after six months. Both died as young men.

Nathan W. Brown also had a successful military career. In 1849, at age thirty-one, Nathan was appointed as a major in the pay department. In 1864, during the Civil War, he was promoted to lieutenant colonel and served as deputy paymaster general. In 1880, he was promoted to brigadier general and paymaster general; he retired in 1882 after 33 years in the army.

Eliza Brown married Edmund Kirby, who served as a colonel in the Mexican–American War and a U.S. Army Paymaster. Their son Edmund also attended West Point, graduated in 1861, and was commissioned as an artillery officer. He served with the Army of the Potomac from First Bull Run through Chancellorsville, where he was severely wounded. Nominated for brigadier general by President Lincoln, he died before the Senate could confirm the promotion, at 23 years of age.

Pamela Brown married David Hammond Vinton (son of David Vinton and brother of Rev. Francis Vinton), who served as assistant quartermaster general of the Union Army during the Civil War. Her younger sister Katherine married Larkin Smith, a Southerner and West Point classmate of their brother William. In 1861, Smith resigned his army commission to serve as assistant quartermaster general of the Confederate army.

== Legacy ==
For his victories in the War of 1812, Brown was awarded a Congressional Gold Medal on November 3, 1814. General Brown was the 24th American to receive this award.

In 1818, Brown was admitted as an honorary member of the New York Society of the Cincinnati.

Several counties, townships, towns, and schools were named after Jacob Jennings Brown, both in New York and in other states:

=== Towns and cities ===
- Town of Brownville, New York
  - Brownville (village), New York
  - General Brown Central School District, Dexter, New York
- The town of Pamelia, New York, was named for his wife, née Pamelia Williams.
- Brown County, Illinois
- Brown County, Indiana
- Brown County, Ohio
- Brown County, Wisconsin
- Brown Township, Lycoming County, Pennsylvania
- Brownstown Township, Jackson County, Indiana
  - Brownstown, Indiana
- Brownsville, Tennessee
- Brownsville, Texas

== See also ==
- Gen. Jacob Brown Mansion

== Citations ==
Military offices
Preceded by Henry Dearborn	Senior Officer of the United States Army; 1815–1821	Succeeded by None (Commanding General of the United States Army)
Preceded by None (Senior Officer of the United States Army)	Commanding General of the United States Army; 1821–1828	Succeeded by Alexander Macomb
