= Francis Vinton =

American military officer, engineer, and church minister (1809–1872)

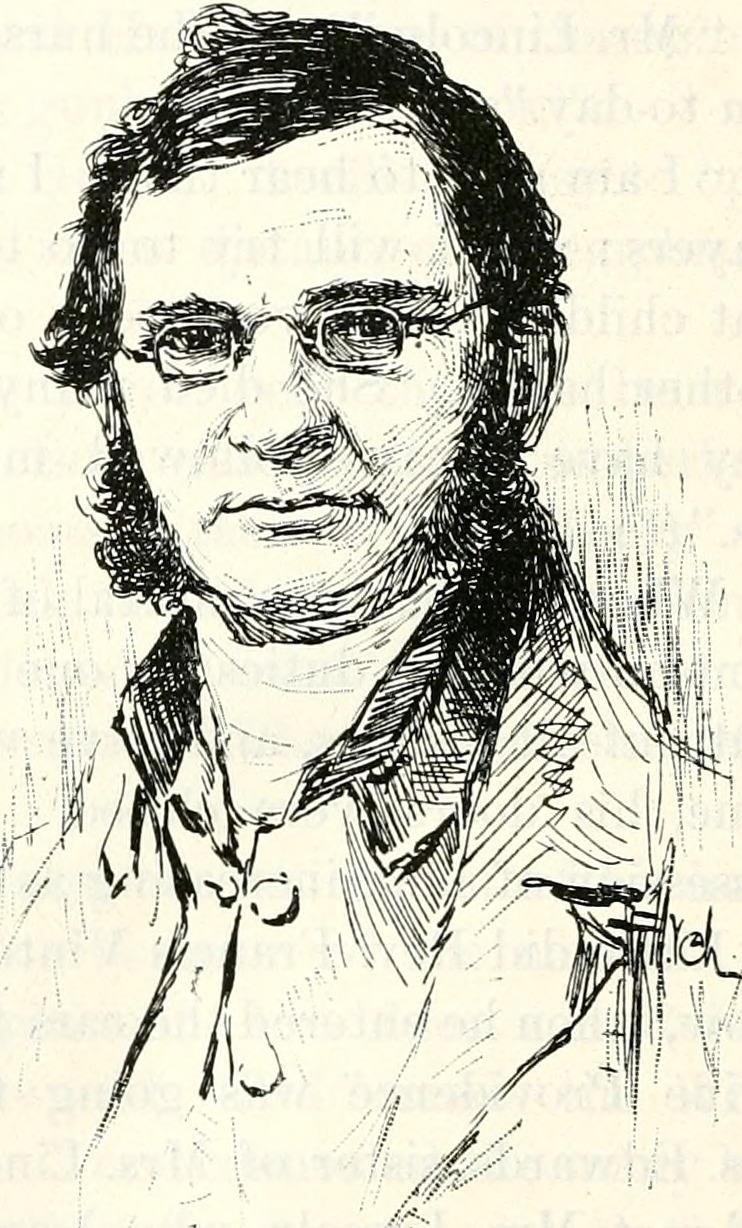
The Rev. Francis Vinton

The Reverend Francis Vinton DD, DCL, LLD (August 20, 1809 – September 29, 1872) was a West Point trained Army officer, Harvard educated lawyer, civil engineer who worked on the Eastern Railroad, and, ultimately, a well-known Episcopal minister.

== Early life ==
Vinton was born in Providence, Rhode Island on August 20, 1809. He was a son of silversmith and merchant David Vinton and Mary (née Atwell) Vinton. Among his siblings were Amos Maine Vinton (who married Frances Jones Dyer, sister of Gov. Elisha Dyer), Maj. John Rogers Vinton, of the Third Artillery (who was killed at the Siege of Veracruz during the Mexican–American War), Gen. David Hammond Vinton, Elizabeth Vinton (wife of George Sears Greene), the Rev. Alexander Hamilton Vinton.

His paternal grandparents were David Vinton and Mary (née Gowen) Vinton. Through his brother John, he was uncle to Brig.-Gen. Francis Laurens Vinton, who badly wounded while fighting in the Battle of Fredericksburg during the American Civil War. Through his brother David, he was uncle to The Right Rev. Alexander Hamilton Vinton, the Bishop of Western Massachusetts. His maternal grandparents were Col. Amos Atwell and Betsey (née Searle) Atwell.

Vinton entered the United States Military Academy, at West Point, New York, in June 1826. Like two of his elder brothers, John and David, he graduated from the Academy with distinction in June 1830.

== Career ==
Following his graduation, he was appointed a Second Lieutenant in the Third Artillery, and reported for duty at Fort Independence, Boston Harbor, the following autumn. While in the military, he entered Law School of Harvard University. Unexpectedly detailed for engineer duty, he had to suspend his studies, serving as a civil engineer in surveying the Boston and Providence Railroad and was first engineer on the Eastern Railroad in 1831 to 1832. After two years, he returned to his regiment, joining his company in Portsmouth, New Hampshire, and in 1834 was admitted to the Bar of Massachusetts. He never entered upon the practice of the law, however, as he resigned his commission from the Army in 1836, and entered the General Theological Seminary of the Episcopal Church in the New York City.

After graduating from the seminary, he was ordained to the ministry in 1839, by The Right Reverend Bishop Alexander Viets Griswold, of Massachusetts. He began in a small parish in Rhode Island, before advancing to Providence, then at Trinity Church in Newport, and, in 1844, to the parish of Emmanuel Church in Brooklyn, New York. When the congregation outgrew Emmanuel Church, he was one of the founders, and the first Rector, of Grace Church in Brooklyn Heights, built under his own personal supervision. In 1849, he was chosen Bishop of the Diocese of Indiana, but declined the honor.

In 1855 he was elected an Assistant Minister of Trinity Church in Manhattan, before he was officially appointed in 1859. A few years before his death, he was appointed to the Professorship of Canon Law at the General Theological Seminary.

=== Published works ===
Vinton was the author of Annals of Cadet Life (1830), Evidences of Christianity (1855), and Manual Commentary on the General Canon Law of the Protestant Episcopal Church (1870).

== Personal life ==
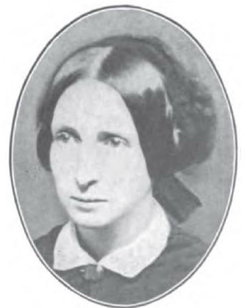
Photograph of his second wife, Elizabeth Mason Perry

On October 8, 1838 in Baltimore County, Maryland, Vinton married Maria Bowen Whipple (1814–1840), a daughter of John Whipple of Providence and Maria (née Bowen) Whipple (a daughter of Harvard and Yale educated physician, Dr. William Bowen). Both his wife and child died in childbirth on June 6, 1840:

- Francis Vinton Jr. (1840–1840), who died at birth.

He remarried on November 3, 1841 in New York City to Elizabeth Mason Perry (1819–1878), a daughter of Commodore Oliver Hazard Perry and Elizabeth Champlin (née Mason) Perry. Together, they were the parents of:

- Francis Vinton Jr. (1842–1881), a professor of music who died unmarried in Portland, Oregon.
- Henry Gilliant Vinton (1844–1860), who died aged 16.
- Elizabeth Perry "Eliza" Vinton (1846–1912), who ran a girls' boarding school with her sister Gertrude; she died unmarried.
- Grace Vinton (1848–1852), who died young.
- Rev. Oliver Perry Vinton (1850–1880), a Reverend who died unmarried.
- Arthur Dudley Vinton (1852–1906), an author, lawyer and inventor; he died unmarried.
- Gertrude Vinton (1856–1934), who established a girls' school in Brooklyn, which she ran for ten years before establishing another girls' school in Ridgefield, Connecticut, which she also ran for ten years; she died unmarried.
- Reginald Vinton (1860–1860), who died young.
- Ludlow W. Vinton (1861–1900), a bank clerk who died of typhoid fever; he never married.
- Paul Vinton (1863–1863), who died young.
- Raymond Perry Vinton (1865–1936), an architect who lived in Pomfret, Connecticut.

Vinton died on September 29, 1872 at his residence in Brooklyn Heights. After a funeral at Trinity Church, he was buried at Island Cemetery in Newport, Rhode Island.
