= Edmund Kirby (army officer) =

American army officer (1840–1863)

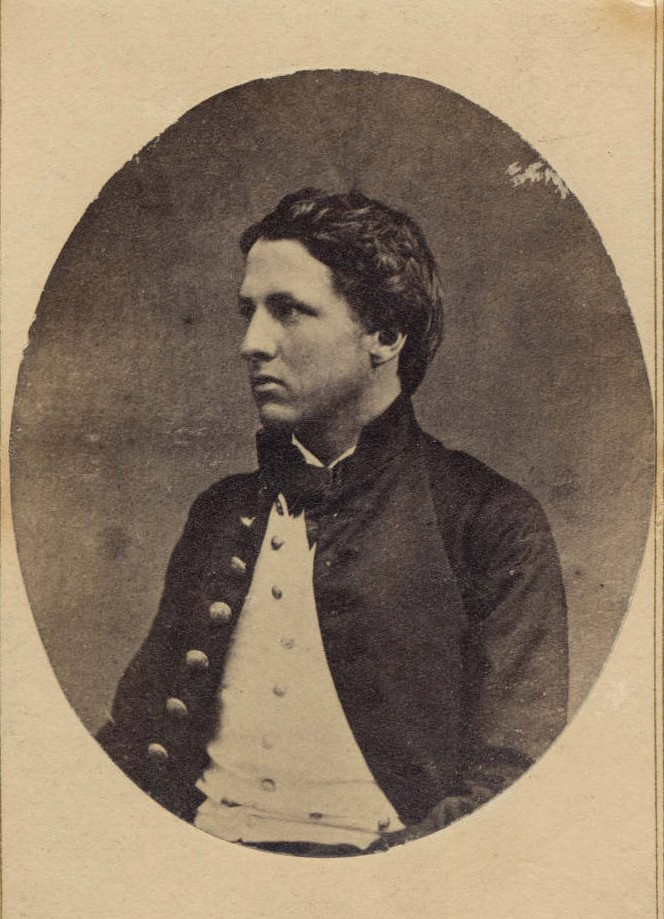
- Born: March 11, 1840; Brownville, New York
- Died: May 28, 1863 (aged 23); Washington, D.C.
- Burial place: Brownville Cemetery
- Military career
- Allegiance: United States
- Branch: Union Army
- Rank: Brigadier General of Volunteers
- Commands: Battery I, 1st U.S. Artillery; 5th Maine Light Artillery Battery: (assumed in battle)
- Conflicts: American Civil War; First Battle of Bull Run; Battle of Ball's Bluff; Peninsula Campaign; Battle of Fair Oaks; Seven Days Battles; Battle of Fredericksburg; Battle of Chancellorsville †

Edmund Kirby (March 11, 1840 – May 28, 1863) was a United States Army artillery officer who was mortally wounded at the Battle of Chancellorsville.

== Biography ==
Kirby was born in Brownville, New York, to Colonel Edmund Kirby (1794–1849), a United States Army paymaster and veteran of the Mexican–American War, and Eliza Brown. He was a second cousin of Confederate general Edmund Kirby Smith, and his mother was the daughter of Major General Jacob Brown, who previously served as the Commanding General of the United States Army. Kirby's uncle, Nathan W. Brown, served as Paymaster-General of the United States Army.

Kirby was a member of the United States Military Academy Class of May 6, 1861 (the first of two West Point classes graduated in that year, which also included notable members Henry A. du Pont, Orville E. Babcock, Adelbert Ames, Emory Upton, and Judson Kilpatrick), graduating shortly after the outbreak of the Civil War. Commissioned as a second lieutenant of Battery I, 1st U.S. Artillery in the Union Army of the Potomac, he was promoted to first lieutenant just eight days later. He served with Battery I at the First Battle of Bull Run and the Battle of Ball's Bluff, and assumed command of the battery during the Peninsula Campaign in March 1862.

In command of Battery I, 1st U.S. Artillery, Kirby led his company throughout the Siege of Yorktown, the Battle of Fair Oaks, the Seven Days Battles near Richmond, and during the summer in the Federal camp at Harrison's Landing. He declined a transfer to the Army Corps of Topographical Engineers in July 1862.

Kirby was absent on sick leave during most of September 1862, missing the Battle of Antietam (during which time Battery I, 1st U.S. Artillery was under the command of Lieutenant George Augustus Woodruff, USMA June 1861), but he returned to duty following the Maryland Campaign and was present in command of his battery at the Battle of Fredericksburg.

Battery I, 1st U.S. Artillery was present at the Battle of Chancellorsville on May 3, 1863. While in command of his own battery, Kirby assumed command of the 5th Maine Light Artillery Battery during the fighting after its own officers had been killed or wounded. While supervising the evacuation of the battery's guns from the battlefield, he was severely wounded in the leg by case shot and was carried from the battlefield by Private John F. Chase, who was later awarded the Medal of Honor upon Kirby's recommendation. He was transported to a hospital in Washington, D.C., where his injured leg was amputated but the wound nevertheless became gravely infected. Kirby died of his injuries on May 28, 1863.

Kirby was promoted to the rank of brigadier general of United States Volunteers by President Abraham Lincoln on May 28, 1863.

He was buried at Brownville Cemetery in his hometown.

In 1920 the U.S. Army named a new mine planter, USAMP Brigadier General Edmund Kirby, for General Kirby.
