= David Hammond Vinton =

US Army brevet major general (1803–1873)

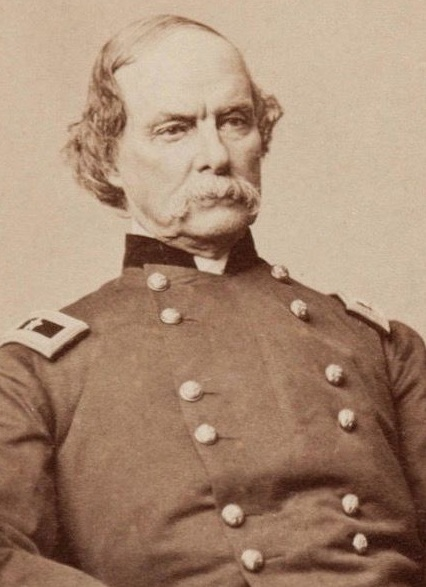
- Vinton as a brevet brigadier general in 1867
- Born: 3 May 1803; Providence, Rhode Island, US
- Died: 21 February 1873 (aged 69); Stamford, Connecticut, US
- Burial place: Swan Point Cemetery, Providence, Rhode Island, US
- Spouse(s): Pamela Brown (m. 1829–1845) Eliza Arethusa Arnold (m. 1848–1873)
- Children: 12 (including Alexander Hamilton Vinton)
- Relatives: David Vinton (father); Francis Vinton (brother); Arthur Dudley Vinton (nephew); Francis Laurens Vinton (nephew); Francis Vinton Greene (nephew); Samuel Dana Greene (nephew); Francis L. V. Hoppin (grandnephew); Howard Hoppin (grandnephew)
- Military career
- Allegiance: United States; Union (American Civil War)
- Service: United States Army; Union Army
- Service years: 1822–1861, 1867–1870 (US Army); 1861–1866 (Union Army)
- Rank: Colonel (US Army); Major General (Brevet)
- Unit: United States Army Quartermaster Corps
- Commands: Quartermaster General of Florida Territory; Chief Quartermaster, Center Division, Army of Occupation; Chief Quartermaster, Pacific Division; Chief Quartermaster, Department of the West; Chief Quartermaster, Department of Texas; New York City Quartermaster Depot
- Wars: American Indian Wars; Creek War of 1836; Seminole Wars; Patriot War; Mexican–American War; American Civil War

David Hammond Vinton (3 May 1803 – 21 February 1873) was a career officer in the United States Army. A veteran of the American Indian Wars, Patriot War, Mexican–American War, and American Civil War, he served from 1822 to 1870 and attained the rank of major general by brevet. Vinton specialized in Quartermaster duties, and his service included command of the New York City Quartermaster Depot during the Civil War.

A native of Providence, Rhode Island, Vinton graduated from the United States Military Academy (West Point) in 1822 and began his career as an officer in the Field Artillery. He soon transferred to the Quartermaster Corps, and he took part in the Creek War of 1836 and Seminole Wars, including service as chief quartermaster of Florida Territory. He later took part in the Mexican–American War as chief quartermaster of the division commanded by Major General John E. Wool.

At the commencement of the American Civil War, Vinton was serving in San Antonio, Texas when the garrison was occupied by soldiers of the Confederate States Army, who took Vinton prisoner. After his parole, he was assigned to head the quartermaster depot in New York City, where he supplied clothing and equipment to Union Army troops until the close of the war. During his wartime service, Vinton attained the rank of colonel and brevet promotions to colonel, brigadier general, and major general as commendations of the notable service he rendered throughout the war. Vinton died in Stamford, Connecticut and was buried at Swan Point Cemetery in Providence.

== Early life ==
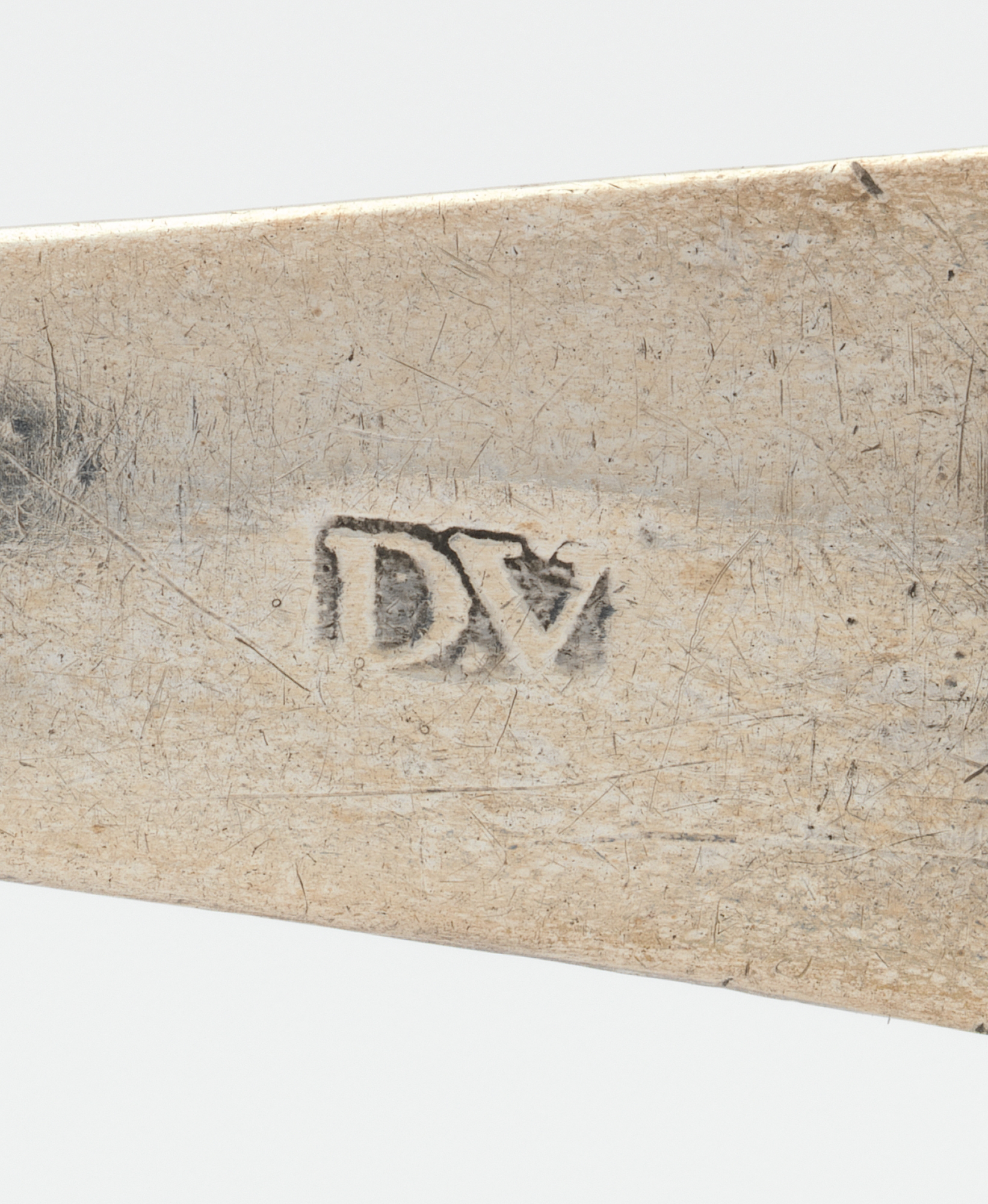
Mark of silversmith David Vinton on a spoon he created in the late 1700s

Vinton was born in Providence, Rhode Island on 3 May 1803, a son of silversmith and Masonic lecturer David Vinton and Mary (Atwell) Vinton. Vinton's family included several prominent members, among them his brother Francis Vinton, an engineer and clergyman. Francis Vinton's son Arthur Dudley Vinton, an author and attorney, was Vinton's nephew. Another nephew, engineer and army officer Francis Laurens Vinton, was the son of Vinton's brother John Rogers Vinton. Grandnephews Francis L. V. Hoppin and Howard Hoppin were prominent architects and the sons of Vinton's niece Louise. Vinton's sister Elizabeth was the wife of army officer George S. Greene, and Vinton was the uncle of their sons Francis Vinton Greene, a US Army officer, and Samuel Dana Greene, an officer in the United States Navy.

Vinton was raised and educated in Providence, and in 1818 he received an appointment to the United States Military Academy at West Point. He graduated in 1822 ranked 14th of 40 and was appointed a second lieutenant by brevet. Among his classmates who later gained prominence in the U.S. Army and Union Army were Joseph K. F. Mansfield, Henry H. Gird, George Wright, David Hunter, George A. McCall, John Joseph Abercrombie, and David Moniac. Among his notable classmates who joined the Confederate States of America during the Civil War were Walter Gwynn and Isaac R. Trimble.

== Start of career ==
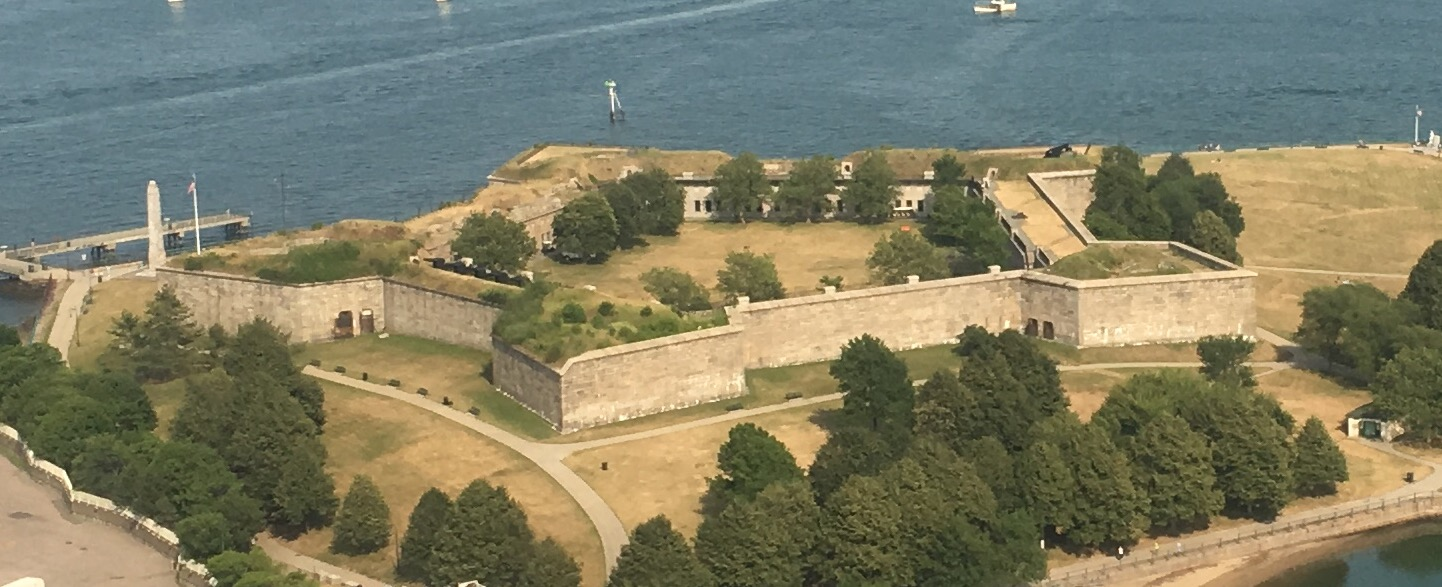
Fort Independence, Massachusetts. Vinton served here early in his career.

Initially assigned to the 1st Artillery Regiment, Vinton was subsequently commissioned as a second lieutenant in the 4th Artillery Regiment, which was performing duty in Florida. He served as an Ordnance officer with the 4th Artillery from August 1822 to June 1823. Vinton performed temporary recruiting duty for the rest of 1823 and was then assigned to the 6th Infantry Regiment at Fort Atkinson, Iowa. He was promoted to first lieutenant in April 1825 and performed Ordnance duty with the 6th Infantry from September 1825 to April 1826. He was then posted to the 3rd Artillery Regiment and assigned to take the course at the Fort Monroe, Virginia Artillery School, where he remained until 1828.

Vinton served at Fort Independence, Massachusetts from 1828 through 1833, including Ordnance duty beginning in March 1831. In January 1834, he was assigned to the garrison at Fort Monroe where he remained until 1836, including a posting as Engineer officer. From 1836 to 1839, he served in Florida as a Quartermaster officer during the Creek War of 1836 and the Seminole Wars, including assignment as Florida Territory's quartermaster general from November 1837 to July 1838. He served on Quartermaster duty in Brownville and Sackets Harbor, New York from 1838 to 1840, during Canada's Patriot War. He was promoted to captain in July 1838.

== Continued career ==
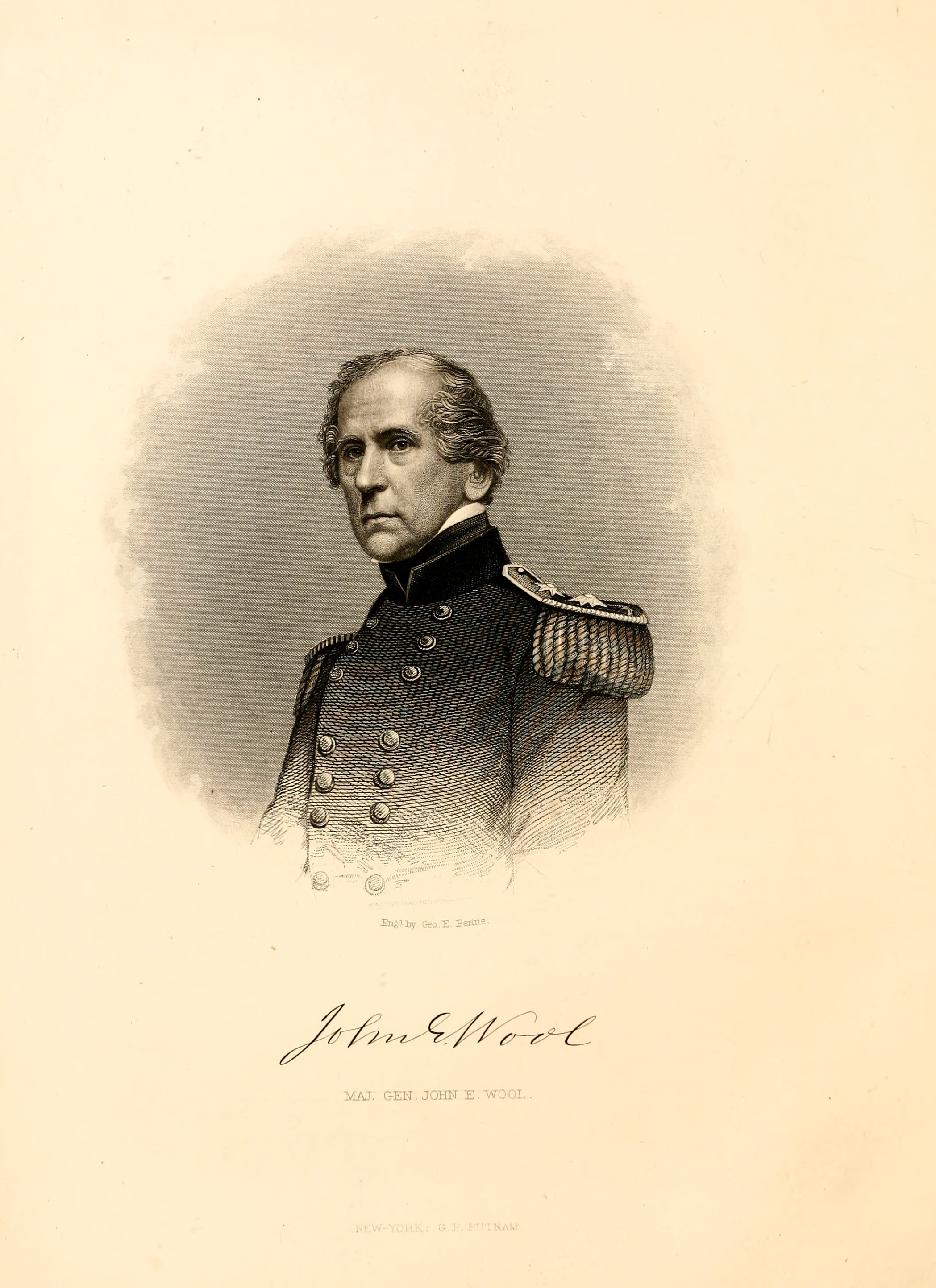
John E. Wool, on whose staff Vinton served during the Mexican–American War

Vinton performed Quartermaster duty at Fort Wayne, Michigan from 1840 to 1842, then returned to Brownville to settle his Patriot War accounts. He served on Quartermaster duty at Fort Johnston, North Carolina in 1843, then was posted again to Madison Barracks at Sackets Harbor, where he remained until 1846. At the start of the Mexican–American War, Vinton was posted first to Fort Porter in Buffalo, New York, then the New York City Quartermaster Depot, where he procured and shipped Quartermaster supplies to the army in Mexico.

In March 1847, Vinton was promoted to major. Later in 1847, he was appointed chief quartermaster on the staff of Major General John E. Wool, commander of the Army of Occupation's Center Division. After the war, he served as chief quartermaster of the army's Pacific Division in San Francisco from June 1849 to January 1850, which was followed by Quartermaster duty in Boston, Massachusetts from 1851 to 1852. Vinton served as chief quartermaster of the Department of the West in St. Louis, Missouri from 1852 to 1856, then was assigned as chief quartermaster of the Department of Texas in San Antonio, where he served from 1857 to 1861. While in Texas, he played a key role in the creation of the United States Camel Corps, which studied the feasibility of the animals for transporting soldiers and supplies in the Southwest United States.

== Later career ==
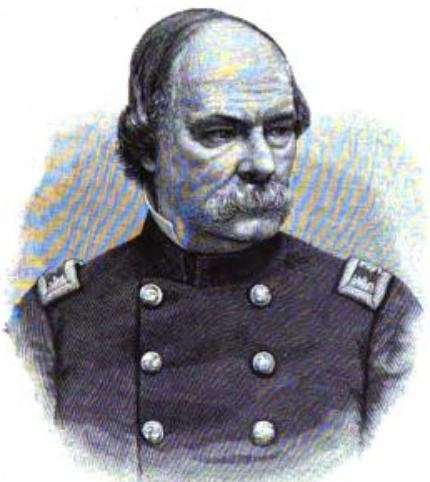
1887 illustration of Vinton based on contemporary photo

At the start of the American Civil War, the Confederate States Army occupied the garrison in San Antonio; Vinton was taken prisoner and held until paroled, after which he departed for the Union states. Contemporary news accounts in the Confederate states indicated that Vinton and the others paroled with him were judged to have violated their parole by rejoining the army in the north, and would be subject to harsh punishment if recaptured. As part of the Union Army, he served throughout the war as chief of the New York City Quartermaster Depot, where he was responsible for supplying troops with clothing and equipment. He was promoted to lieutenant colonel in August 1861. In March 1865, Vinton received brevet promotions to colonel and brigadier general as commendations for the superior service he rendered during the war. In August 1864, he was promoted to colonel of United States Volunteers, and in July 1866 he received promotion to colonel in the regular army.

Vinton retired in July 1866, but remained on duty to settle his wartime Quartermaster accounts; he handled nearly $120 million during the war (over $2.5 billion in 2025). When his accounts were balanced, they were nearly perfect; the government reimbursed Vinton forty-two cents. In June 1867, he received promotion to brevet major general in recognition of his outstanding wartime service, to date from March 1865. In February 1870, he retired fully, after which he resided in Stamford, Connecticut. He died in Stamford on 21 February 1873 and was buried at Swan Point Cemetery in Providence.

== Family ==
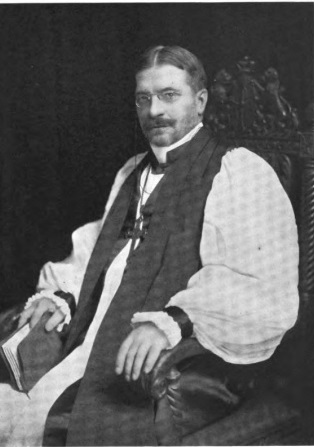
Rt. Rev. Alexander H. Vinton, son of David H. Vinton

In July 1829, Vinton married Pamela Brown, a daughter of Major General Jacob Brown and sister of Brigadier General Nathan W. Brown. She died in 1845, and in 1848 he married Eliza Arethusa Arnold, to whom he remained married until his death. Eliza Arnold's siblings included Harriette, the wife of U.S. Supreme Court Justice Rufus W. Peckham. In addition, Eliza was the aunt of Dorothy Arnold, whose 1910 disappearance made international news and remains unsolved.

With his first wife, Vinton's children included:

- Pamela
- Jacob
- James
- Elizabeth
- Hammond
- John
- Mary

Vinton's children with his second wife included:

- Harriette
- Alexander
- Ida
- Marion
- Robert

Harriette Vinton was the wife of John Clarkson Jay (1844–1923), who was the son of John Clarkson Jay (1808–1891), grandson of Peter Augustus Jay, and great-grandson of John Jay. Alexander Vinton became a clergyman and served as Bishop of the Episcopal Diocese of Western Massachusetts.

== Dates of rank ==
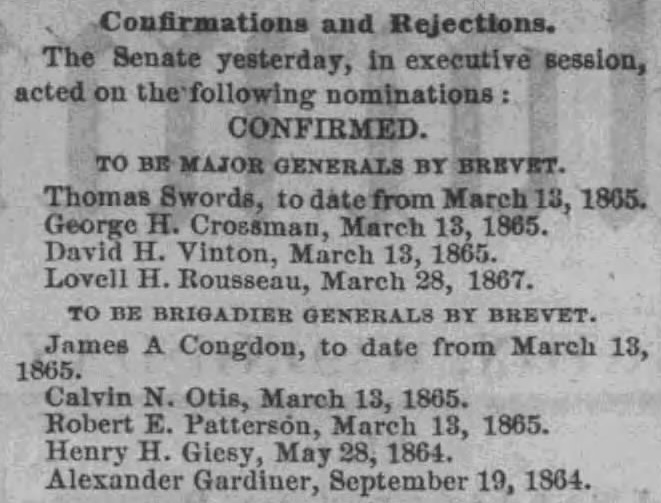
17 April 1867 Washington Chronicle item containing details of Vinton's promotion to brevet major general

Vinton's dates of rank were:

- Second Lieutenant (Brevet), 1 July 1822
- Second Lieutenant, 1 July 1822
- First Lieutenant, 7 April 1825
- Captain, 7 July 1838
- Major, 3 March 1847
- Lieutenant Colonel, 3 August 1861
- Colonel (Brevet), 13 March 1865
- Brigadier General (Brevet), 13 March 1865
- Colonel (ex officio), (United States Volunteers), 2 August 1864
- Colonel, 29 July 1866
- Major General (Brevet), 30 June 1867 (to date from 13 March 1865)
