= David Vinton =

American silversmith and Freemason (1774–1833)

David Vinton (January 6, 1774 – July 1833) was an American silversmith, merchant, and Masonic lecturer, active in Providence, Rhode Island.

== Early life ==
Vinton was born in Medford, Massachusetts. The son of David Vinton and Mary (née Gowen) Vinton, he was orphaned at age 4, and on December 15, 1778, his uncle, silversmith William Gowen, was appointed his guardian.

== Career ==
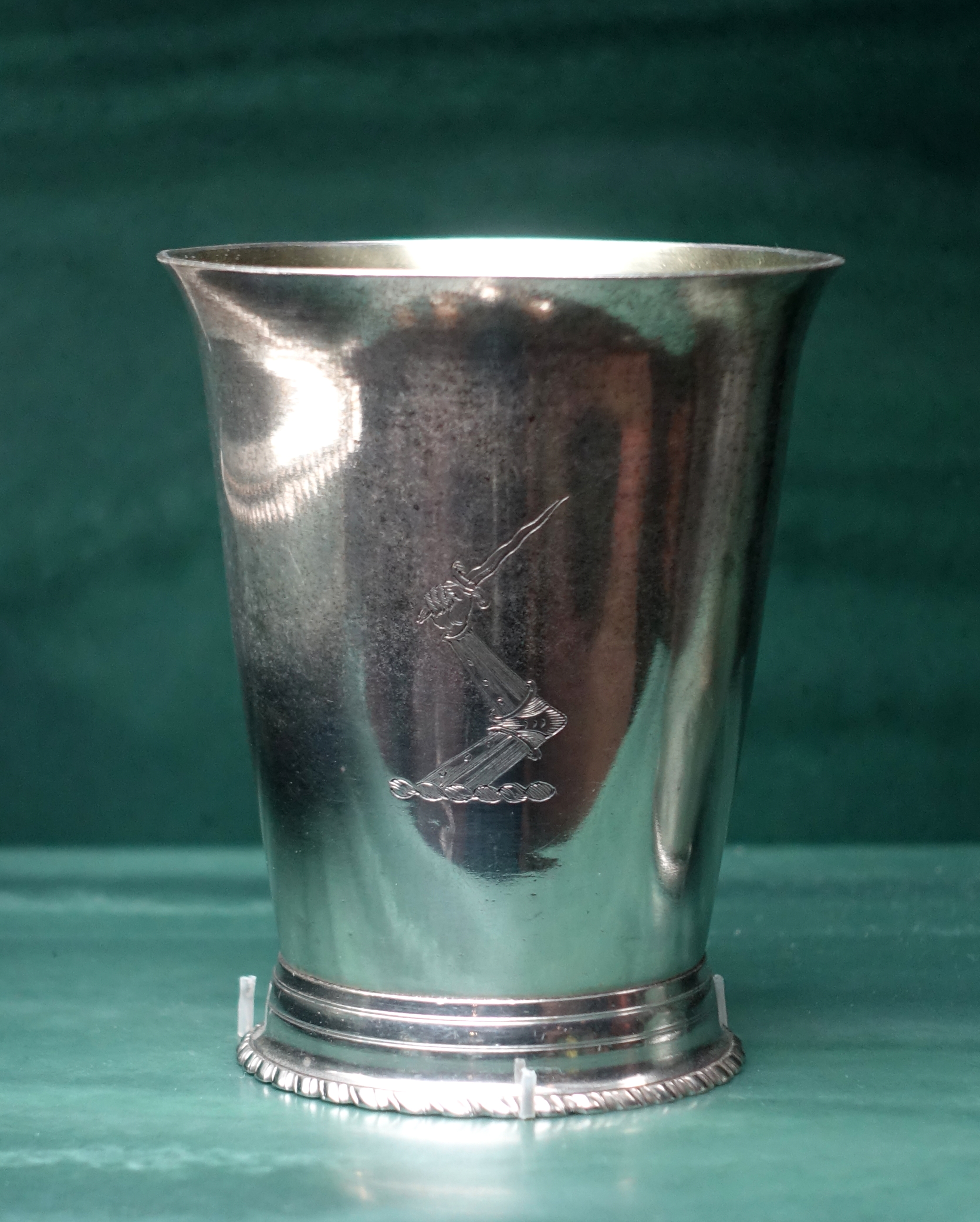
Beaker by David Vinton, c. 1800

He apprenticed about 1787 to David Tyler in Boston. At some point he moved to Providence, where on December 22, 1792, and January 24, 1793, he advertised in the Providence Gazette as:

"Goldsmith and Jeweller, From Boston, Informs the Ladies and Gentlemen of Providence, and its Vicinity, that he has for sale at his Shop, the North End Corner of Market Parade and Nearly opposite, His Excellency, Governor Fenner's a complete assortment of Goldsmith's Wares . . . also Silver buckles . . . Table, Tea, Salt and Desert Spoons . . . Bracelets, etc., etc. . . . All kinds of Gold and Silverware made and repaired in the neatest manner and on the shortest notice."

The same paper carried similar notices in 1795, but by 1796 he had become a general merchant continuing to sell spoons, bracelets, etc., and from 1799 to 1818 he advertised the sale of bonnets, wigs, butter, sheet music and miscellaneous musical instruments, as well as the Washington funeral medals made by Jacob Perkins of Newburyport.

His silver is collected in the Metropolitan Museum of Art and Fowler Museum at UCLA.

=== Freemasonry ===
He was prominent in Freemasonry as a member of Providence's Mount Vernon Lodge No. 4. In 1816 he compiled and published a volume called "The Masonic Minstrel," of which the full title was "The Masonic Minstrel, a Selection of Masonic, Sentimental, and Amorous Songs. Duets, Glees, Canons, Rounds and Canzonets, Respectfully Dedicated to the Most Ancient and Honorable Fraternity of Free and Accepted Masons," with an appendix containing a short historical sketch of Masonry and a list of all the Lodges in the United States. It was printed for the author by H. Mann and Company and sold more than twelve thousand copies.

In the last years of his life, he travelled as an itinerant teacher and lecturer of Masonic rituals, and in particular the York Rite degree work. This led to much controversy, however, and in 1821 he was expelled from the Grand Lodge of North Carolina for un-Masonic conduct. Although his home lodge exonerated him in 1822, his reputation was darkened.

== Personal life ==
On May 17, 1797 in Providence, Vinton was married Mary Atwell, a daughter of Col. Amos Atwell and Betsey (née Searle) Atwell. Together, they had seven children, six of whom lived to adulthood, including:

- Amos Maine Vinton (1798–1837), who married Frances Jones Dyer, sister of Gov. Elisha Dyer.
- John Rogers Vinton (1801–1847), a Major of the Third Artillery who was killed at the Siege of Veracruz during the Mexican–American War; he married Lucretia Dutton Parker, a daughter of Ebenezer Parker, in 1829.
- David Hammond Vinton (1803–1873), a brevet major general who married Pamela Brown, a daughter of Major General Jacob Jennings Brown, in 1829. After her death in 1845, he married Eliza Arethusa Arnold, a daughter of Daniel Hinckley Arnold, in 1848.
- Elizabeth Vinton (1805–1832), who married Gen. George Sears Greene, a son of Caleb Greene.
- Rev. Alexander Hamilton Vinton (1807–1881), who married Eleanor Stockbridge Thompson, a daughter of Ebenezer Thompson and Ruth Otis (née Stockbridge) Thompson in 1835.
- Rev. Francis Vinton (1809–1872), who married Maria Bowen Whipple, a daughter of John Whipple of Providence in 1838. After her death during childbirth in 1840, he married Elizabeth Mason Perry, a daughter of Commodore Oliver Hazard Perry, in 1841.
- Ruth Paget Olney Vinton (1812–1812), who died young.

Vinton died in July 1833 while visiting Kentucky on Masonic business, and was buried in Shakertown, Kentucky.

=== Descendants ===
Through his son Amos, he was a grandfather of Frances Jones Vinton, who married John Farnum Chapin (grandparents of Vinton Chapin, the U.S. Ambassador to Luxembourg); and Elizabeth Vinton, who married Horatio Nelson Slater Jr.

Through his son John, he was a grandfather of Brig.-Gen. Francis Laurens Vinton, who badly wounded while fighting in the Battle of Fredericksburg during the American Civil War; and Louise Claire Vinton, who married Dr. Washington Hoppin (parents of Francis L. V. Hoppin, Howard Hoppin and Louise Claire Hoppin, a founder of the Red Cross).

Through his son David, he was a grandfather of The Right Rev. Alexander Hamilton Vinton, the Bishop of Western Massachusetts.

== See also ==
- History of Providence County, Rhode Island, Volume 1, Richard Mather Bayles, W. W. Preston, 1891, page 584.
