= Nathan W. Brown =

Nathan W. Brown (Paymaster General of the US Army)

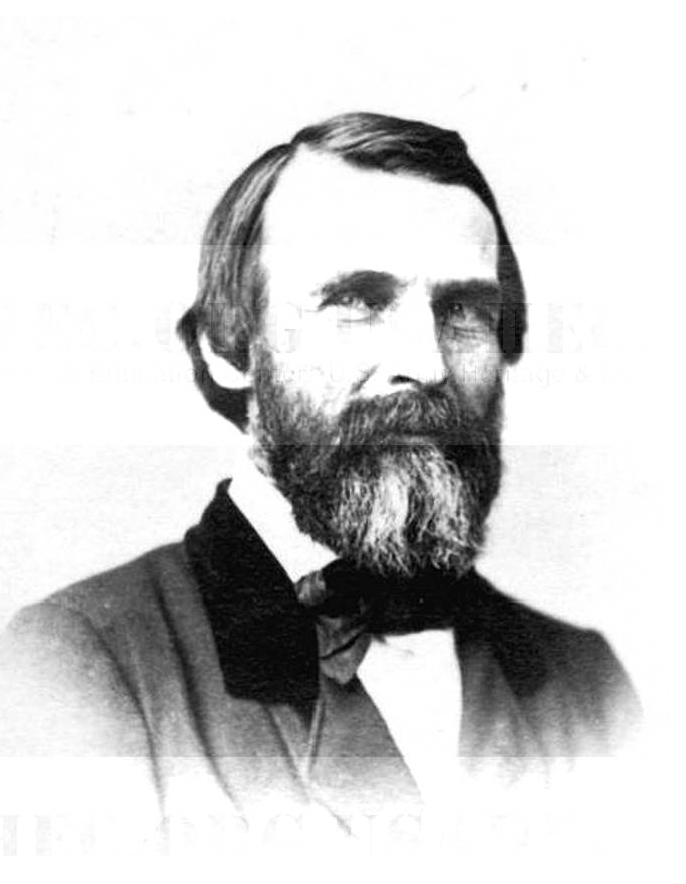
- From the George L. Febiger Photograph Collection. U.S. Army Heritage and Education Center.
- Born: January 15, 1819; Brownville, New York, US
- Died: March 4, 1893 (aged 74); Washington, D.C., US
- Burial place: Arlington National Cemetery
- Spouse: Virginia DuVal (m. 1859–1878)
- Children: 4
- Relatives: Jacob Brown (father); Edmund Kirby (nephew)
- Military career
- Allegiance: United States; Union (American Civil War)
- Service: United States Army; Union Army
- Service years: 1849‒1861, 1866‒1882 (U.S. Army); 1861‒1865 (Union Army)
- Rank: Brigadier General
- Unit: U.S. Army Pay Department
- Commands: Chief Paymaster, Pay District of Missouri; Chief Paymaster, New York City Pay Depot; Paymaster-General of the United States Army
- Wars: American Civil War

Signature
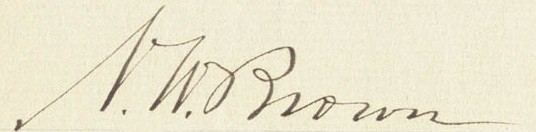

Nathan W. Brown (15 January 1819 ‒ 4 March 1893) was a career officer in the United States Army. A Union Army veteran of the American Civil War, Brown attained the rank of brigadier general. His service in the U.S. Army Pay Department culminated with appointment as Paymaster-General of the United States Army, a post in which he served from 1880 until his retirement in 1882.

== Biography ==
Nathan Williams Brown was born in Brownville, New York on 15 January 1819, a son of Major General Jacob Brown and Pamelia (Williams) Brown. He was raised and educated in Brownville and his siblings included Pamela, the wife of Army officer David Hammond Vinton. Another sister Eliza, was the wife of army paymaster Colonel Edmund Kirby (1794–1849) and mother of army officer Edmund Kirby (1840‒1863). Brown worked for his brother-in-law as a clerk; when Kirby died in July 1849, Brown successfully applied for appointment as a paymaster and in September he was commissioned as a major.

Brown served initially in Florida. In 1850, he was assigned to duty in California, where he remained until 1855. He performed duty in New York City from 1855 to 1857, then served again in Florida. In 1858, he was assigned to Fort Kearny, Nebraska, where he remained until 1860. He then served at Fort Smith, Arkansas; when the post was evacuated at the start of the American Civil War in April 1861, Brown was assigned to paymaster duties with the Department of the Missouri. Initially assigned to Fort Washita, Indian Territory, he was subsequently posted to Fort Leavenworth, Kansas.

In 1864, Brown was assigned as the army's deputy paymaster-general. After the war, he was assigned as chief paymaster of the Pay District of Missouri. In 1869, he was assigned as chief paymaster of the Pay Department's New York City depot. In 1880, he was promoted to brigadier general and appointed as Paymaster-General of the United States Army. He held this position until February 1882, when he retired.

In retirement, Brown was a resident of Washington, DC. He died in Washington on 4 March 1893. He was buried at Arlington National Cemetery.

== Family ==
In 1859, Brown married Virginia DuVal. They were the parents of four children, two of whom lived to adulthood.

== Dates of rank ==
Brown's effective dates of rank in the Pay Department were:

- Major, 5 September 1849
- Lieutenant Colonel, 4 April 1864
- Colonel (Brevet), 13 March 1865
- Colonel, 28 July 1866
- Brigadier General (Brevet), 15 October 1867
- Brigadier General, 8 June 1880
- Brigadier General (Retired), 6 February 1882
