= Grace Church (Brooklyn Heights) =

Episcopal church in Brooklyn, New York

Grace Church Brooklyn Heights
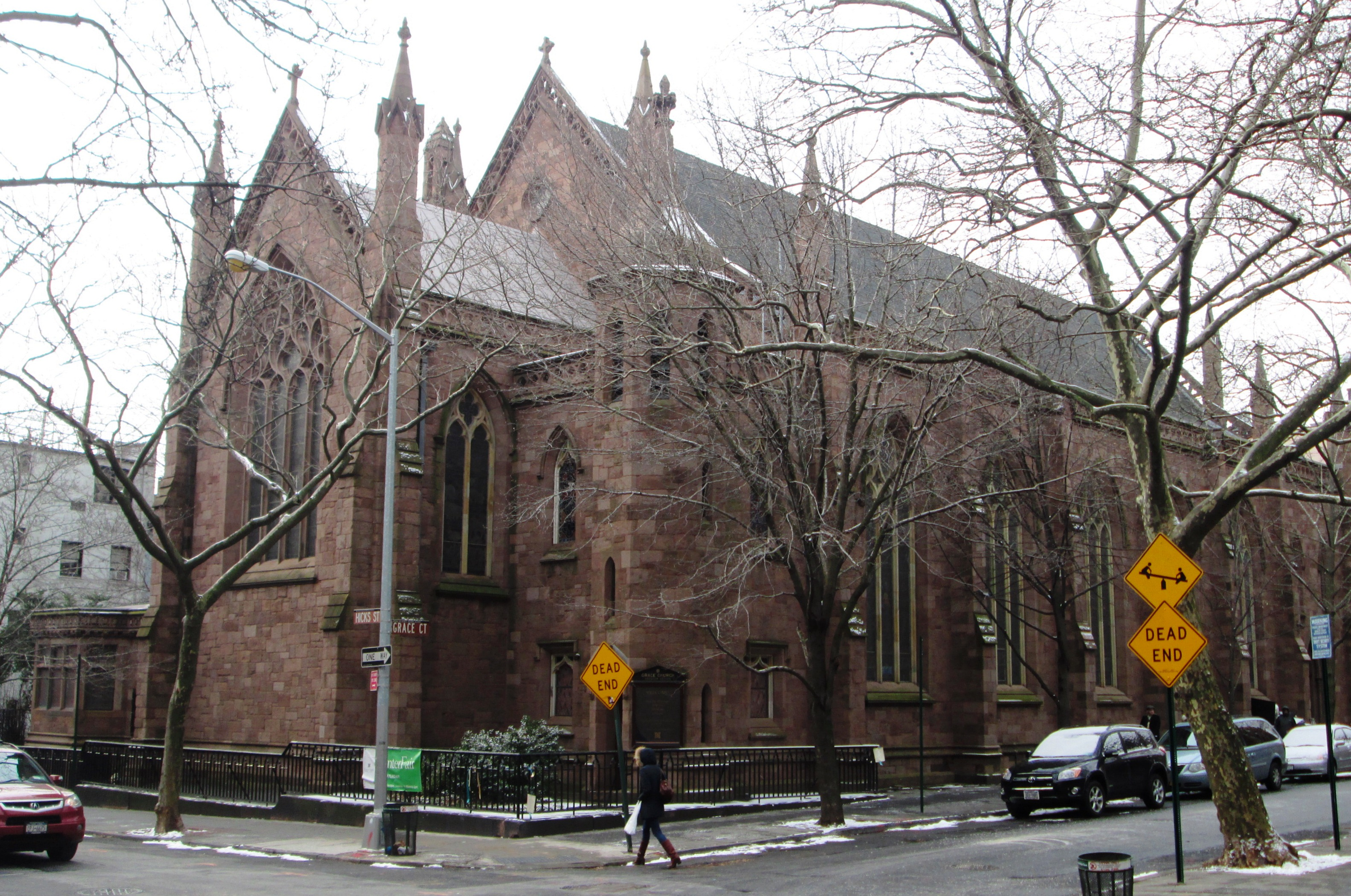
- Grace Church Brooklyn Heights
- 40°41′40.54″N 73°59′45.83″W
- Location: 254 Hicks Street; Brooklyn, New York City, New York
- Country: United States
- Denomination: Episcopal Church
- Churchmanship: Broad Church
- Website: gracebrooklyn.org

History
- Status: Parish church

Architecture
- Functional status: Active
- Architect: Richard Upjohn
- Style: Gothic Revival
- Years built: 1847–1848
- Groundbreaking: June 29, 1847
- Completed: December 10, 1848

Administration
- Province: Province II
- Diocese: Episcopal Diocese of Long Island

Clergy
- Rector: The Rev. Dr. Allen F. Robinson

Grace Church Brooklyn Heights is a historic parish church in Brooklyn Heights, New York which is part of the Episcopal Diocese of Long Island. The church and Grace Church School, the oldest preschool in Brooklyn, is located at 254 Hicks Street and Grace Court within the Brooklyn Heights Historic District. The Church and school buildings were designed by architect Richard Upjohn.

== History ==
Before the Church's founding, many Brooklyn Episcopalians crossed the East River into Lower Manhattan every Sunday to attend services at Grace Church, New York. In the early 1840s, a small group of Brooklyn Episcopalians established Emmanuel Church on Sydney Place. The parish quickly outgrew its space, and a new church was incorporated in 1847, taking the name Grace Church Brooklyn Heights.

The Reverend Francis Vinton, the combined parish's first rector, with a building committee headed by Henry Evelyn Pierrepont and Col. Tunis Craven, selected a site at the corner of Hicks Street and Grace Court which was acquired for $15,000. They hired well known architect Richard Upjohn, who had also designed Trinity Church in Manhattan, to design a building in Gothic Revival style. The cornerstone was laid on June 29, 1847, and on December 10, 1848 the doors were opened for its first service. The total cost for the structure was $46,737.52. In 1865, the congregation built a Sunday and parish school building, also designed by Richard Upjohn, next door to the church on Grace Court. In 1866, the ceiling was painted in a celestial motif.

During the early 1900s, decorative paint was gradually added to the walls and ceiling, and the original diamond-pane windows were replaced with stained glass from studios such as Tiffany, Cottier & Co., J&R Lamb Studios (Lamb Studios), Clayton and Bell, Franz Mayer of Munich, and Charles Booth of London and New York. In 1931, the Sunday and parish school building was replaced by the present-day Parish House, where Grace Church School is located.

The church continues to be a part of the Brooklyn Heights neighborhood today. The church reported 1,081 members in 2017 and 1,271 members in 2023; no membership statistics were reported nationally in 2024 parochial reports. Plate and pledge income reported for the congregation in 2024 was $1,282,234. Average Sunday attendance (ASA) in 2024 was 147 persons, down from a reported 449 in 2017.

=== Restoration ===
Between 2013 and 2014, Grace Church underwent an extensive $5 million restoration and renovation by EverGreene Architectural Arts. As part of the restoration, they installed a new copper roof, new insulation, new lighting, new wiring and cleaned the 3,200 organ pipes. Additionally, several prominent decorative elements in the nave and sanctuary were restored. The work revealed the church's open trusswork ceiling which features a swath of celestial eight-pointed stars in gold, yellow and red on a bright royal blue background.

For the restoration efforts, Grace received a 2015 Lucy G. Moses Preservation Award by the New York Landmarks Conservancy, an award for Excellence in Historic Preservation from the Brooklyn Heights Association and a 2014 Preservation Award from the Victorian Society New York.

== Notable people ==
=== Rectors ===
- Francis Vinton
- Jared Bradley Flagg
- Eugene Augustus Hoffman

=== Parishioners ===
- Henry Evelyn Pierrepont
- Tom Chapin
- Harry Chapin
- Steve Chapin
- "Big" John Wallace

== Architectural drawings ==
Architectural drawings of Grace Church but architect Richard Upjohn, 1847.

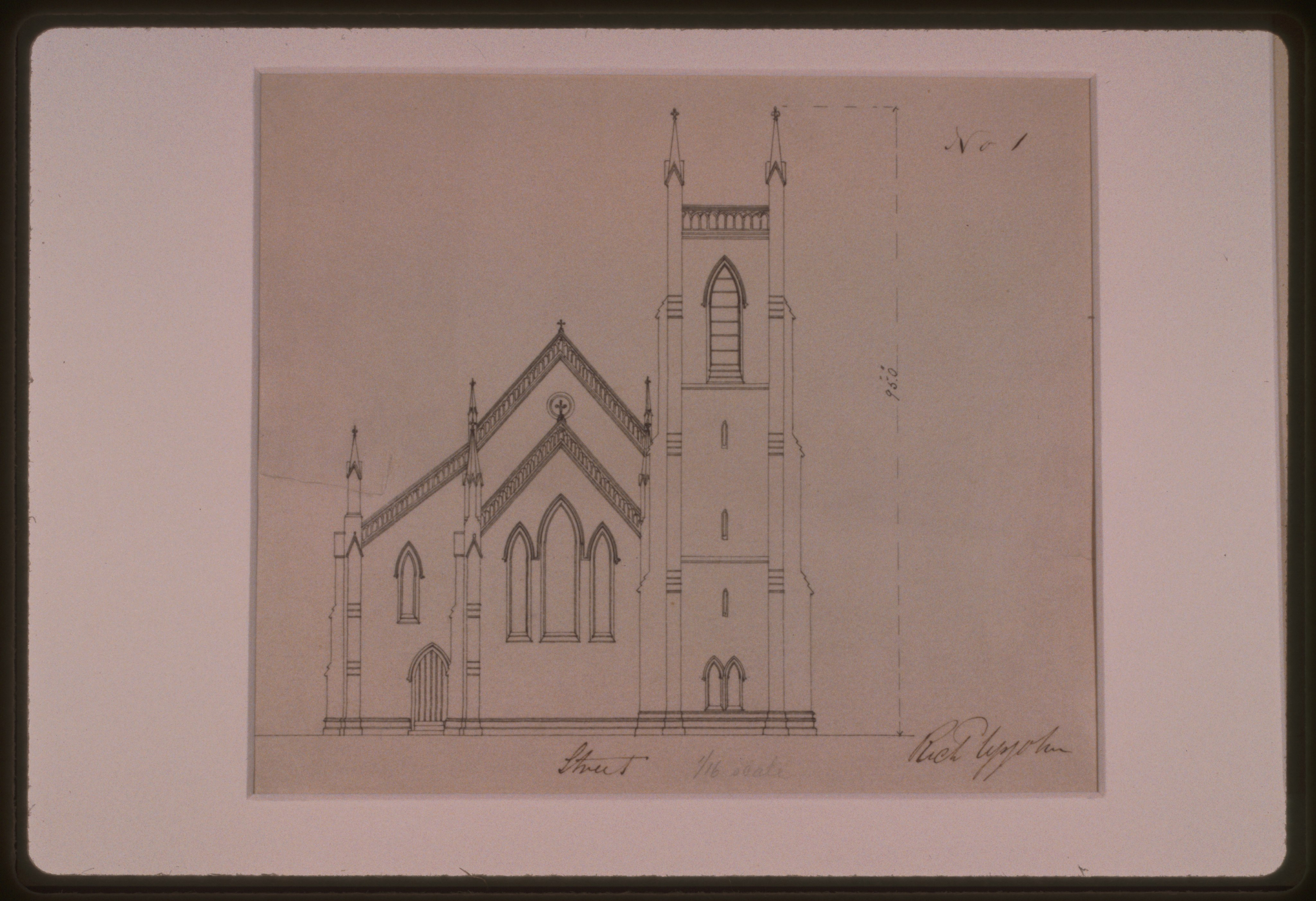
Front elevation

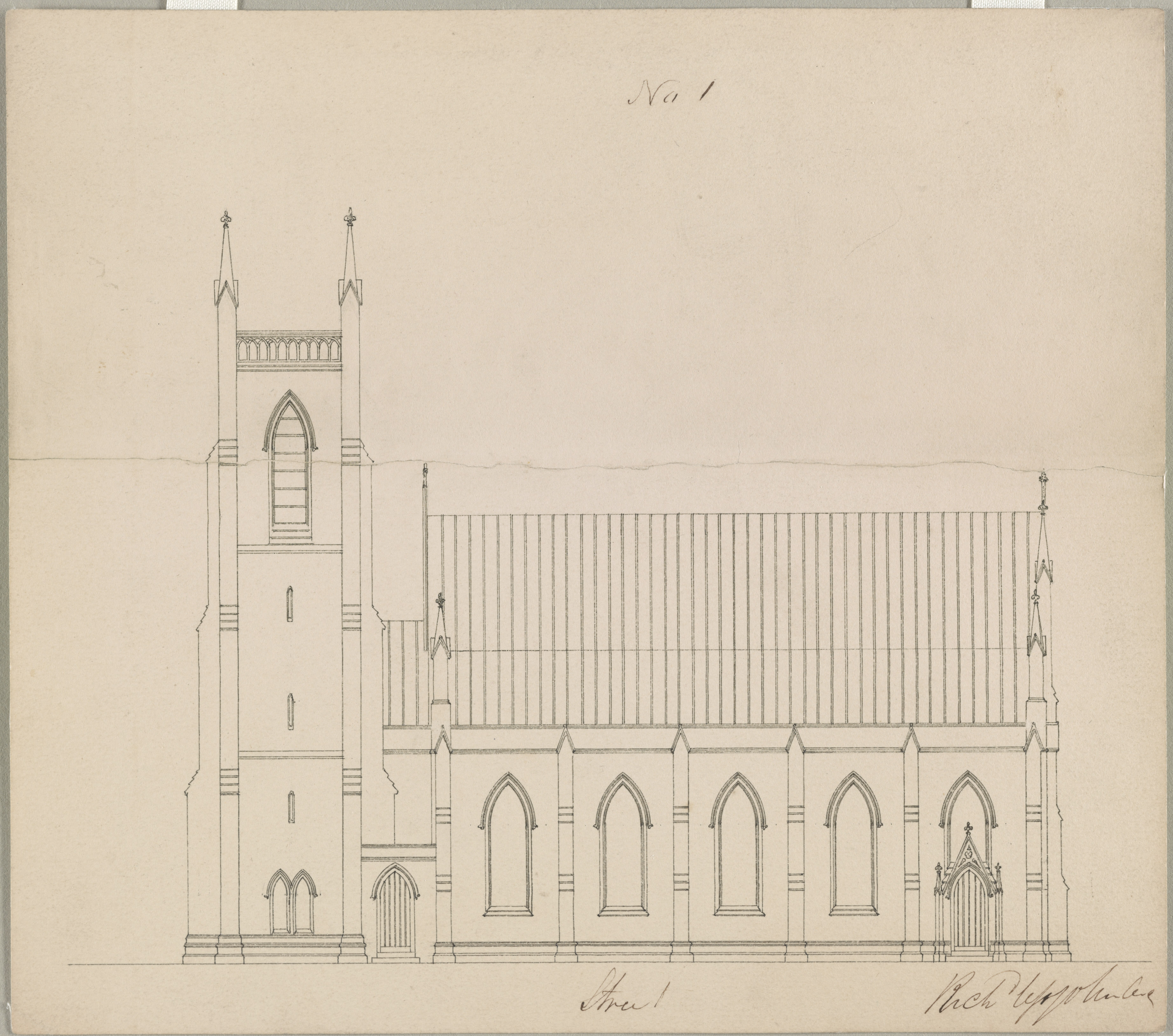
Side elevation

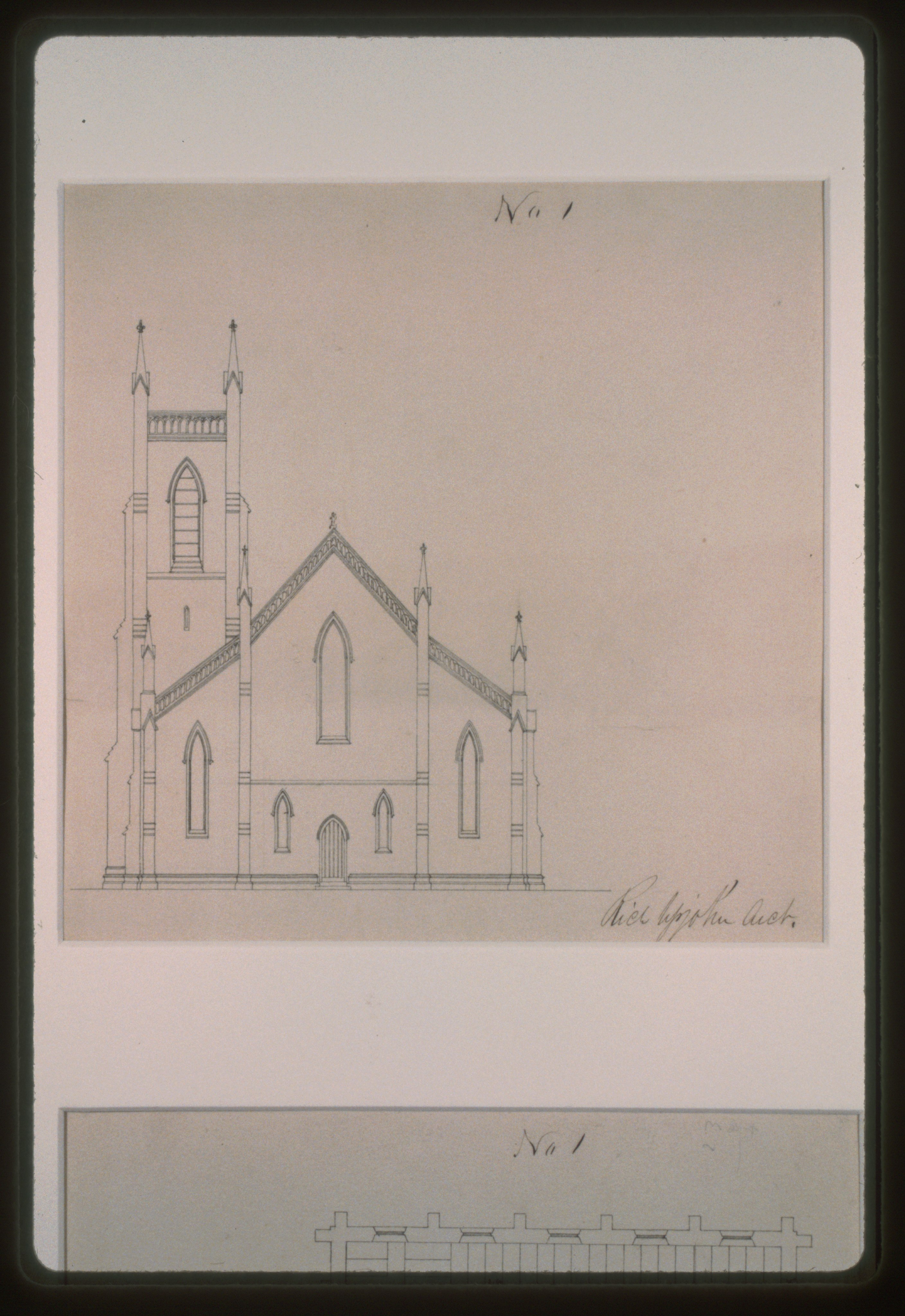
Rear elevation

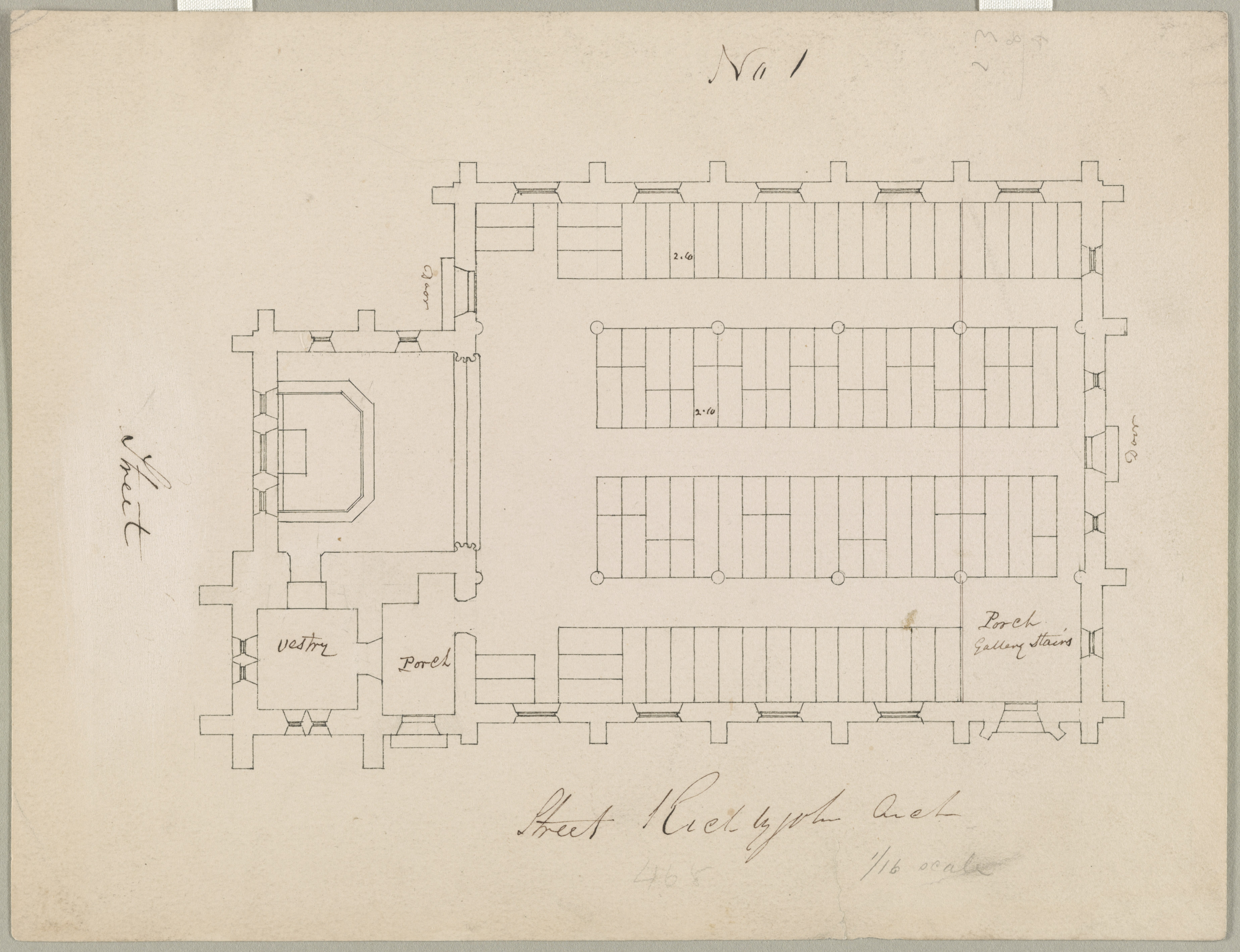
Interior layout
