= USS Greene =

Clemson-class destroyer in the United States Navy

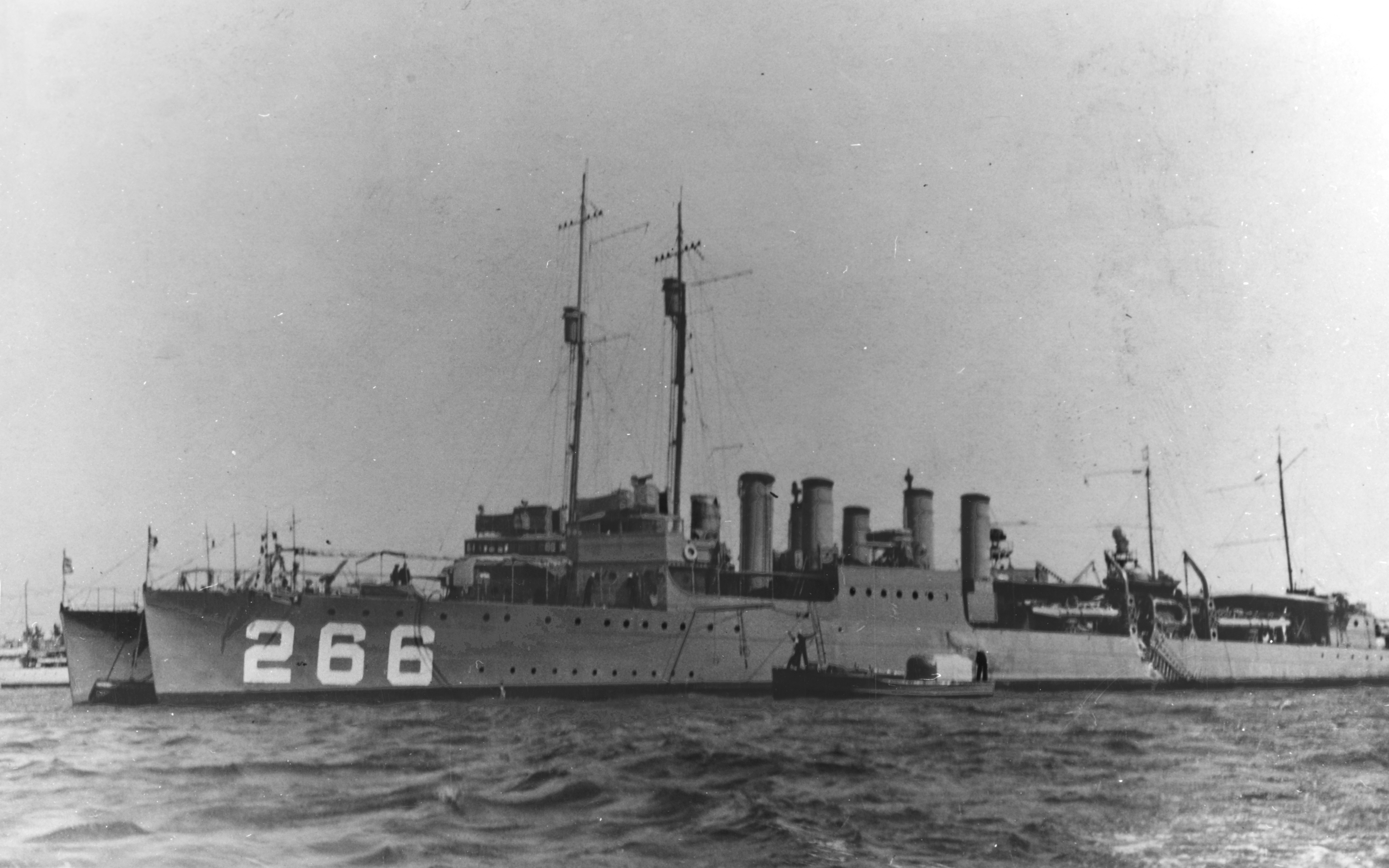
- USS Greene

History

United States
- Namesake: Samuel Greene
- Builder: Bethlehem Shipbuilding Corporation, Squantum Victory Yard
- Laid down: 3 June 1918
- Launched: 2 November 1918
- Commissioned: 9 May 1919
- Decommissioned: 23 November 1945
- Stricken: 5 December 1945
- Fate: Wrecked 9 October 1945; wreck destroyed 11 February 1946

General characteristics
- Class & type: Clemson-class destroyer
- Displacement: 1,215 tons
- Length: 314 feet 4 1/2 inches (95.822 m)
- Beam: 30 feet 11 1/2 inches (9.436 m)
- Draft: 9 feet 4 inches (2.84 m)
- Propulsion: 26,500 shp (20 MW); geared turbines, 2 screws
- Speed: 34 knots (63 km/h)
- Range: 4,900 nm @ 15 kn; (9,100 km @ 28 km/h)
- Complement: 122 officers and enlisted
- Armament: 4 × 4 in (100 mm) guns, 1 × 3 in (76 mm) gun, 12 × 21 inch (533 mm) torpedo tubes

USS Greene (DD-266/AVD-13/APD-36) was a Clemson-class destroyer in the United States Navy in service from 1919 to 1922. She was recommissioned in 1940 and wrecked in a storm in October 1945.

== History ==
Greene was named for Samuel Greene and launched 2 November 1918 by the Bethlehem Shipbuilding Corporation's Fore River Shipyard in Quincy, Massachusetts; sponsored by Mrs. John Stevens Conover, the namesake's daughter; and commissioned 9 May 1919.

=== Destroyer (1919-1922) ===
Greene sailed from Newport, Rhode Island 5 June 1919 for Brest via Plymouth, England, and returned to New York 27 July. Underway again 18 August, she put in at San Diego, California, 22 December and decommissioned there in March 1920. Remaining in the Reserve Destroyer Force until 10 September 1921, she sailed from San Diego that date for the Puget Sound Navy Yard. Greene returned shortly thereafter to San Francisco, California, arriving 2 December 1921, and decommissioned there 17 June 1922.

=== Seaplane tender (1940-1944) ===
Recommissioned 28 June 1940 at San Diego, Greene was towed to San Francisco and was redesignated AVD-13 6 April 1941 following conversion. She sailed 27 April for the Caribbean and conducted training and tended seaplanes off Puerto Rico and Bermuda.

One week after the Japanese attacked Pearl Harbor, Greene sailed for Brazil. Until the summer of 1942 she served as seaplane tender at Natal with one call at Rio de Janeiro for repairs in February 1942. She returned to Charleston, South Carolina 18 July 1942. She escorted a convoy from Norfolk, Virginia to Bermuda and operated in the South Atlantic for the next 6 months as a convoy escort, making two voyages to Rio de Janeiro.

Back at Norfolk 26 February 1943, she steamed from there to NS Argentia, Newfoundland, to operate with Bogue, one of the new escort carriers designed to hunt German submarines in the North Atlantic. Both warships sailed 23 April to escort a convoy to Londonderry Port, Northern Ireland, and made the eastward passage without incident. On the return leg of the voyage, however, one of the first major engagements between carrier-based aircraft and submarines attempting a rendezvous for mass attack occurred 21 May – 22 May, when Bogue's planes made six attacks on submarines and sank U-569 in 50-40 N., 35-21 W. Twenty-four Germans were captured. During a second antisubmarine patrol from 31 May to 20 June 1943, Bogue and her escorts, including Greene, sank further submarines: U-317 5 June in 30-18 N., 42-50 W., and U-118 in 30-49 N., 33-49 W. one week later. For these two successful antisubmarine operations Greene received the Presidential Unit Citation. The Bogue group was the first of a series of offensive antisubmarine warfare patrols in response to the U-boat assault in the Atlantic.

Subsequently, until the fall of 1943, Greene escorted a fast troop convoy from Norfolk to the United Kingdom and return, and operated off Bermuda. On 5 October she sailed as carrier escort for Core in company with Belknap and Goldsborough. On 20 October the group sank U-378 in 47-40 N., 28-27 W.

=== High-speed transport (1944-1945) ===
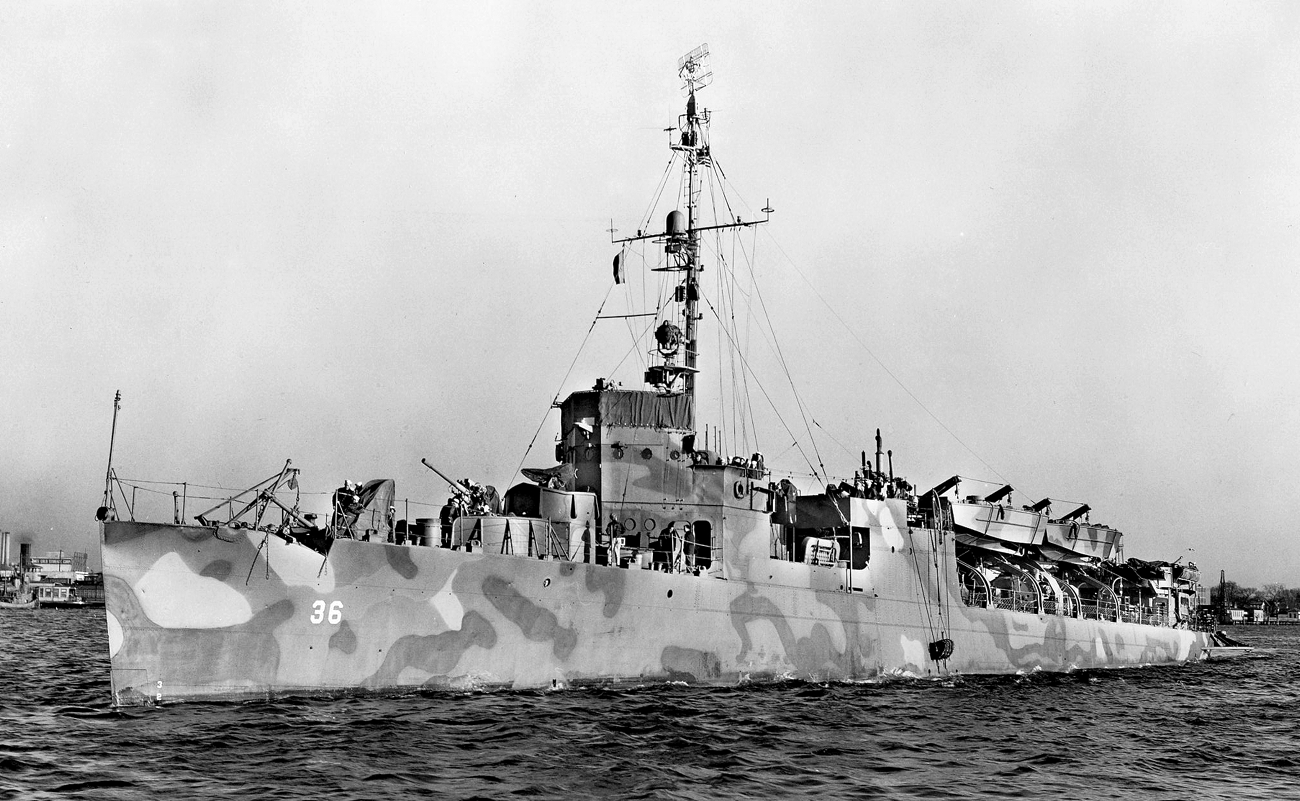
Greene in January 1945.

Greene returned to Charleston 19 January 1944 for conversion to high speed transport, and was designated APD-36 on 1 February 1944. After intensive training, she stood out 12 April for Oran, Algeria, to take part in Operation Dragoon, the invasion of Southern France. On 14 August, when she left the staging area at Propriano, Corsica, and landed American and Canadian troops on the Levant and Port-Cros islands off the coast of France between Toulon and Cannes. Greene's troops were assigned to the mission of seizing the strategic islands and silencing long range coastal batteries thought to be emplaced there. That day, the islands were secured - many of the German "guns" turned out to be stove pipes - and the stage was set for 15 August assault on the mainland.

With her tasks accomplished, Greene served on escort duty in the Mediterranean until departing Oran 6 December 1944 for Norfolk, where she put in 21 December. Underway once more 29 January 1945, the warship steamed via Panama to reach Ulithi 31 March and commenced escort duties. During April she escorted four carriers to Okinawa while the battle for that island was underway. She returned to Guam to meet another Okinawan convoy, and stood antisubmarine picket line duty off Okinawa. Until the fall of 1945, Greene continued escort duties between Okinawa, Saipan, and the Philippines. After the war's end, she evacuated ex-prisoners of war from Nagasaki after that port had been razed by the second atomic bomb dropped on Japan, and moored at Okinawa 24 September.

=== Fate ===
Greene's long career came to an end during Typhoon Louise on 9 October 1945 at Okinawa. Winds in excess of 100 knots drove her aground on the northwest coast of Kudaka, damaging her beyond economic repair. All useful material from the ship was salvaged. She decommissioned 23 November 1945. Greene was struck from the Navy List 5 December 1945. Her wreck was destroyed with explosives on 11 February 1946.

== Awards ==
Greene received three battle stars and the Presidential Unit Citation for World War II service.
