= Francis Vinton Greene =

United States Army officer (1850–1921)

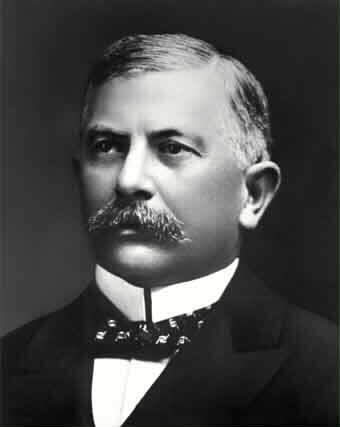
- Born: June 27, 1850; Providence, Rhode Island, U.S.
- Died: May 15, 1921 (aged 70); New York, New York, U.S.
- Education: U.S. Military Academy
- Relatives: George S. Greene (father); Samuel Dana Greene (brother)
- Military career
- Allegiance: United States
- Service years: 1870–1886, 1898–1899
- Rank: Major General
- Units: 2nd Brigade, 2nd Division, VIII Corps
- Conflicts: Spanish–American War; Battle of Manila
- Other work: War Department attaché, Professor of Artillery at West Point, New York City Police Commissioner

Francis Vinton Greene (June 27, 1850 – May 15, 1921) was a United States Army officer who fought in the Spanish–American War. He came from the Greene family of Rhode Island, noted for its long line of participants in American military history.

== Biography ==
Greene was born in Providence, Rhode Island, on June 27, 1850, a son of George S. Greene and Elizabeth (Vinton) Greene. Army officer David Hammond Vinton was his uncle. He attended the United States Military Academy at West Point and graduated in 1870, first in his class. He first served in the U.S. artillery and then transferred to the Corps of Engineers in 1872. He next served as an attaché from the War Department to the U.S. legation in St. Petersburg, Russia. While there he served in the Russian army during its war with Turkey. He was promoted to first lieutenant in 1874 and captain in 1883. He returned to the U.S. and was a civil engineer to the city of Washington, D.C., and was an instructor of practical military engineering at West Point before resigning from the Army on December 31, 1886. He published multiple articles on the development of modern warfare and U.S. military policy.

After leaving the Army, Greene became president of the Barber Asphalt Paving Company, joining the New York National Guard on December 18, 1889, as a major and serving as 1st Brigade engineer. He was elected colonel of the 71st New York Infantry Regiment on February 2, 1892.

When the Spanish–American War broke out he raised the 71st New York Volunteer Infantry and was commissioned as its colonel on May 2, 1898. He was quickly promoted to brigadier general of Volunteers on May 27, 1898. He commanded the second Philippine Expeditionary Force which became the 2nd Brigade, 2nd Division, VIII Corps. Greene took a prominent part in the Battle of Manila in 1898. He assisted in the surrender negotiations for Manila. In August 1898 he was promoted major general of Volunteers and resigned on February 28, 1899. During his service, he was put in charge of the finances of the preliminary Philippine administration. In September 1898, he briefed President McKinley on the Philippine situation and recommended the annexation of the entire archipelago. He wrote to William R. Day and William McKinley that he and Admiral Dewey agreed that the Philippines should not be divided, and it would be much better to hold the islands as one. He expected British agreement.

After the war, he pursued a variety of occupations. He was a delegate to the Republican National Convention in 1900. He served as the New York City Police Commissioner from 1903 to 1904. He was president of the Niagara-Lockport and Ontario Power Company, along with other business ventures with Buffalo businessman John J. Albright. Greene died on May 15, 1921, at his home on the Upper East Side of Manhattan, New York City. He was interred at Arlington National Cemetery.

== Legacy ==
Greene's family holds a distinguished place in American military history. His father was Civil War general, George Sears Greene, famous for his defense of Culp's Hill at the Battle of Gettysburg. His older brother, Samuel Dana Greene, was the executive officer of the USS Monitor during the Battle of Hampton Roads. All were from Rhode Island.

== Dates of rank ==
Insignia	Rank	Date	Component
No insignia	Cadet, USMA	September 1, 1866	Regular Army
	Second Lieutenant	June 15, 1870	Regular Army (Artillery)
	Second Lieutenant	June 10, 1872	Regular Army (Engineers)
	First Lieutenant	January 13, 1874	Regular Army (Engineers)
	Captain	February 20, 1883	Regular Army (Engineers)
	Major	December 18, 1889	New York; National Guard
	Colonel	February 2, 1892	New York; National Guard
	Colonel	May 2, 1898	Volunteers
	Brigadier General	May 27, 1898	Volunteers
	Major General	August 13, 1898	Volunteers

== Publications ==
His publications include a series of works on military campaigns, including:

- The Russian Army and its Campaigns in Turkey. New York: D. Appleton and Company. 1879 – via Internet Archive.
- Sketches of Army Life in Russia. London: W. H. Allen & Co. 1881 – via Internet Archive.
- The Mississippi (Campaigns of the Civil War). New York: Charles Scribner's Sons. 1882 – via Internet Archive.
- General Greene. New York: D. Appleton and Company. 1893 – via Internet Archive.
- The American Revolutionary War and the Military Policy of the United States. New York: Charles Scribners's Sons. 1911 – via Internet Archive.
- "Foreword and Epilogue". Why Europe is at War: The Question Considered From the Points of View of France, England, Germany, Japan and the United States. New York and London: G. P. Putnam's Sons. 1915. pp. v–xvi and 141–170 – via Internet Archive.
- Our First Year in the Great War. New York and London: G. P. Putnam's Sons. 1918 – via Internet Archive.
- Greene also wrote a biographical sketch in a collection of Theodore Roosevelt's political writings entitled, "American Ideals", originally published 1897 and subsequently republished for Roosevelt's presidential campaign in 1900.

== See also ==
- Battle of Manila (1898)

Police appointments
Preceded by John Nelson Partridge	NYPD Commissioner; 1903–1904	Succeeded by William McAdoo
