= Samuel Greene (naval officer) =

Samuel Dana Greene Sr.
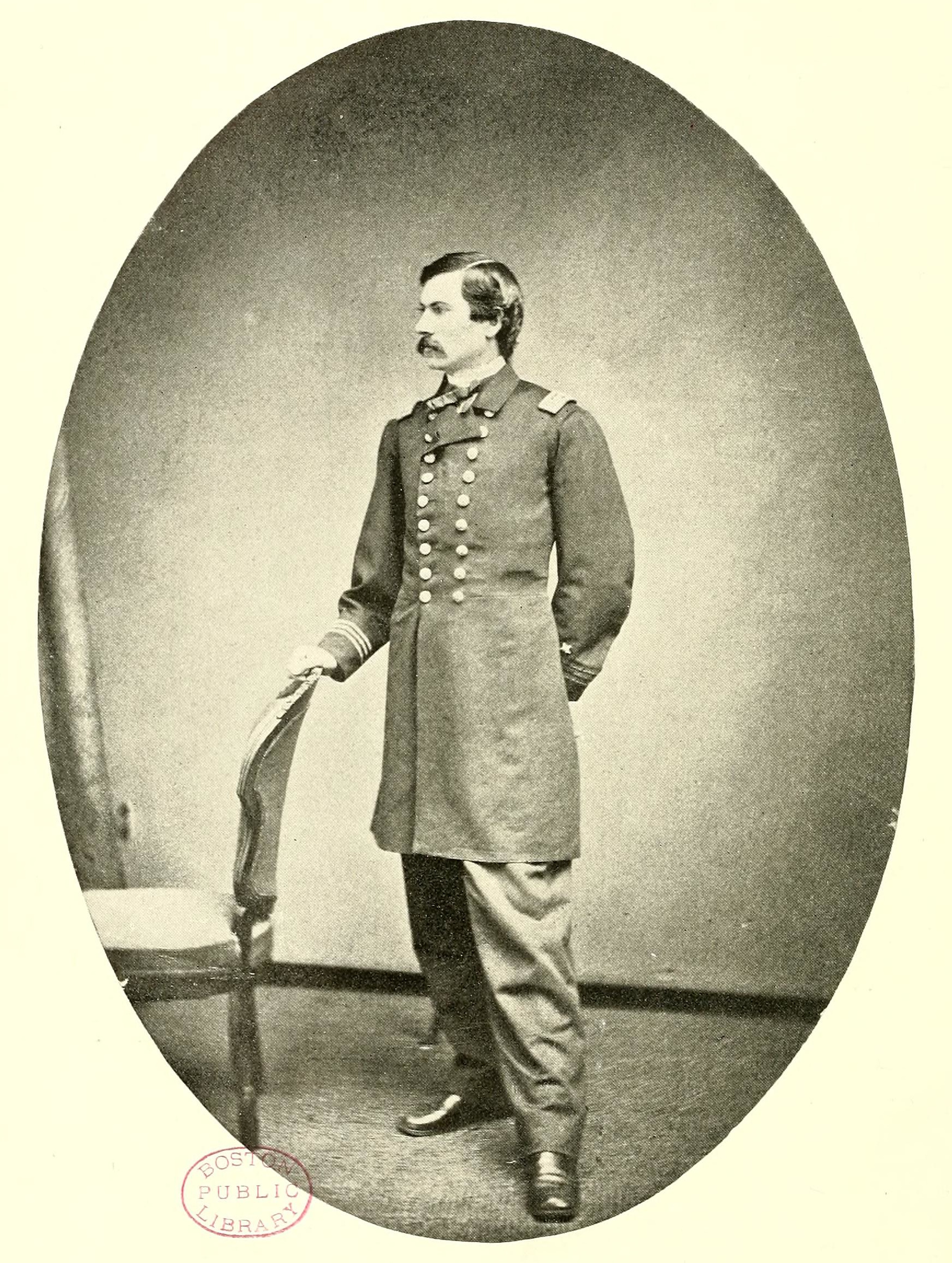
- Born: February 11, 1839; Cumberland, Maryland
- Died: December 11, 1884 (aged 45) Portsmouth, New Hampshire
- Allegiance: United States of America
- Branch: United States Navy
- Service years: 1855–1884
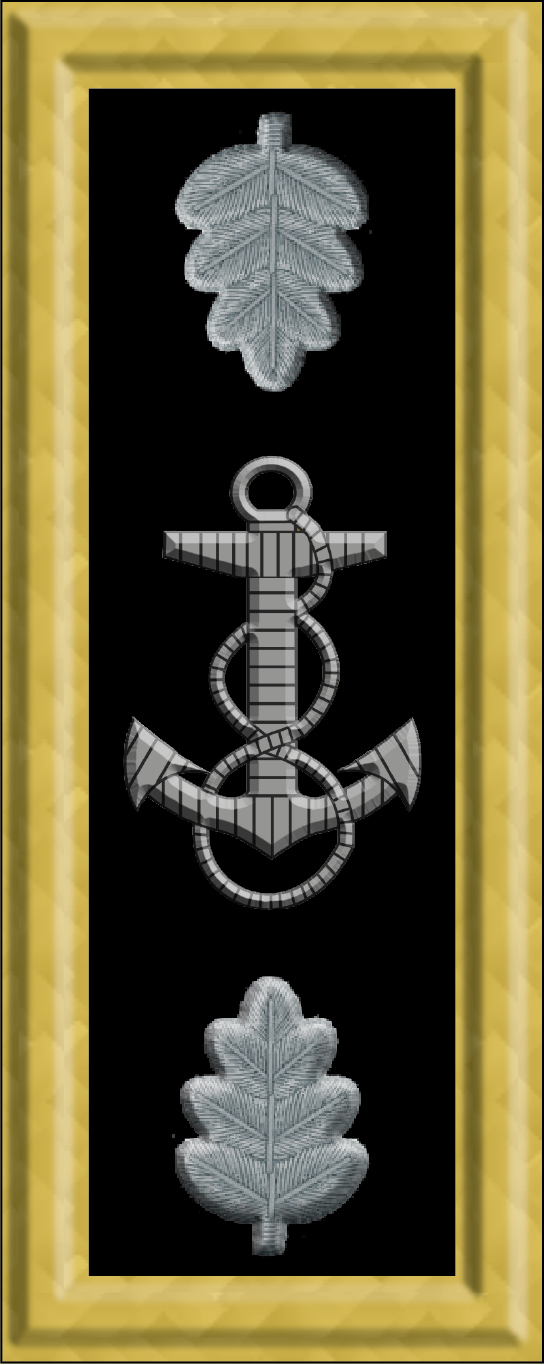
- Rank: Commander
- Commands: USS Monitor; USS Juniata; USS Monongahela; USS Despatch
- Conflicts: American Civil War

Samuel Dana Greene Sr. (February 11, 1839 – December 11, 1884) was an officer in the United States Navy during the American Civil War, mostly noted for his service aboard the USS Monitor during the Battle of Hampton Roads.

== Biography ==
=== Early life and career ===
Greene was born in Cumberland, Maryland, the son of future U.S. Army General George S. Greene and Elizabeth (Vinton) Greene. Army officer David Hammond Vinton was his uncle. He entered the United States Naval Academy on September 21, 1855, and graduated on June 9, 1859, with the rank of midshipman. He was stationed on the steam sloop Hartford, which transported John Elliott Ward, the American ambassador to various cities in China to settle American claims.

=== Civil War ===
When the Civil War broke out, the Hartford was ordered to return home. Greene, having been promoted to lieutenant on August 31, 1861, arrived in Philadelphia on December 2, 1861. After a short leave, he volunteered for duty on the Monitor. Greene was appointed executive officer, serving under Commander Lieutenant John L. Worden during its historic four-hour battle at Hampton Roads, Virginia, with the Confederate ironclad warship CSS Virginia on March 9, 1862. During the battle he assumed full command of Monitor when Worden was temporarily blinded by shell fragments from an explosion from one of Virginia's broadsides. After the subsequent retreat and assessment of all damage Greene ordered the return to battle and continued engaging the Virginia to a standoff. Greene continued to command the Monitor until Thomas O. Selfridge Jr. took command on March 10, 1862.

From April to May 1862 Greene continued to serve as executive officer on Monitor during the Battle of Drewry's Bluff on the James River, Virginia, and later provided naval support for General McClellan's forces on land along that river. Greene was aboard the ship when it foundered in a gale 20 miles off Cape Hatteras on December 31 – January 1, 1863, which Greene survived after being pulled into a lifeboat by the ship's surgeon, Dr. Grenville M. Weeks.

In 1863 Greene served aboard the gunboat Florida on the blockade of North Carolina, then in 1864–1865 aboard the sloop Iroquois, under the command of Christopher R. P. Rodgers, sailing around South America and across the Pacific to Singapore in search of the Confederate raider CSS Shenandoah.

=== Post-war career ===
Greene was promoted to Lieutenant Commander on August 11, 1865, and served as instructor of mathematics at the Naval Academy from 1866 to 1868. From 1868 to 1871 he served in the Pacific Squadron, aboard the sloops Ossipee and Saranac, and the screw steamer Pensacola. He served as the head of the department of astronomy, navigation and surveying at the Naval Academy from 1871 to 1875, receiving promotion to Commander on December 12, 1872. Greene commanded the Juniata and Monongahela between 1875 and 1878, was assistant superintendent of the academy from 1878 to 1882, then commanded the Despatch in 1883–1884.

Greene was serving as the executive officer of the Portsmouth Navy Yard when on December 11, 1884, at the age of 45, he committed suicide at Portsmouth, New Hampshire, and was buried in the Juniper Hill Cemetery in Bristol, Rhode Island.

== Personal life ==
Greene was married twice. First to Mary Willis Dearth (1839-1874) and second to Mary Abby Babbitt (1839-1926). Mary Abby Babbitt was the daughter of Major Jacob Babbitt (1809-1862) of the 7th Rhode Island Volunteer Infantry, who was killed in action at the Battle of Fredericksburg.

Greene had three children by his first wife - Samuel Dana Greene Jr. (1864-1900), who graduated from the United States Naval Academy in 1883, Mary Richmond (Greene) Conover (1867-?) and Charles de Boketon Greene (1871-?).

== Namesake ==
The destroyer USS Greene (DD-266) (1919–1945) was named for him.

== See also ==
- Union Navy

== Bibliography ==
- Baxter, James Phinney, 3rd (1968). The Introduction of the Ironclad Warship (reprint of the 1933 ed.). Hamden, Connecticut: Archon Books. p. 398. ISBN 9781557502186. OCLC 695838727.
- Davis, William C. (1981). Duel Between the First Ironclads. University Press, Baton Rouge: Louisiana State (First Published New York: Doubleday & Co., Inc., 1975). ISBN 0-8071-0868-5.
