= Francis Laurens Vinton =

American Civil War general for the Union

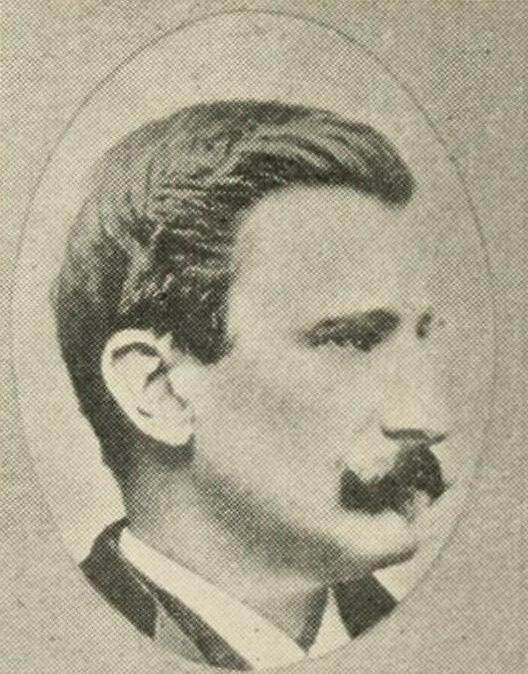
Francis L. Vinton

Francis Laurens Vinton (June 1, 1835 – October 6, 1879) served in the Union Army during the American Civil War. As colonel he commanded the 3rd Brigade of Howe's division at the Battle of Fredericksburg, and was very badly wounded. His parents were army officer John Rogers Vinton and Lucretia (Dutton) Parker; Vinton's uncle was David Hammond Vinton and his grandfather was David Vinton.

== Legacy ==
Vinton's likeness is featured on the northern side of the Soldiers' and Sailors' Monument in Portland, Maine.

== See also ==
- List of American Civil War generals (Union)

== Sources ==
- Warner, Ezra J. (1964). "Francis Laurens Vinton". Generals in Blue: Lives of the Union Commanders. Baton Rouge: Louisiana State University Press. pp. 528–529.
