= Alexander Hamilton Vinton =

American Anglican bishop (1852–1911)

The Right Reverend Alexander Hamilton Vinton D.D., LL.D.
- Bishop of Western Massachusetts
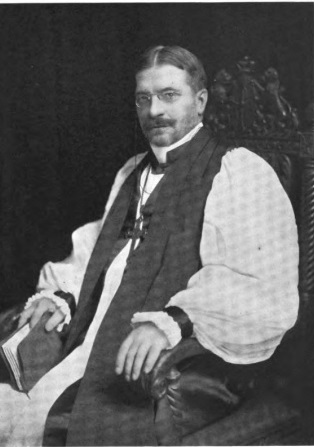
- Church: Episcopal Church
- Diocese: Western Massachusetts
- In office: 1902–1911
- Successor: Thomas Frederick Davies Jr.

Orders
- Ordination: September 29, 1878
- Consecration: April 22, 1902 by Thomas Frederick Davies

Personal details
- Born: March 30, 1852 Brooklyn, New York City, New York, United States
- Died: January 18, 1911 (aged 58) Springfield, Massachusetts, United States
- Buried: Swan Point Cemetery
- Denomination: Anglican
- Parents: David Hammond Vinton and Eliza Arnold

Alexander Hamilton Vinton (March 30, 1852 – January 18, 1911) was first bishop of the Episcopal Diocese of Western Massachusetts from 1902 to 1911.

== Education ==
Vinton was born on March 30, 1852, in Brooklyn, New York City, the son of David Hammond Vinton and Eliza Arnold. In 1873 he graduated from St Stephen's College in Annandale-on-Hudson, New York. He also studied at the General Theological Seminary and graduated with a Bachelor of Divinity in 1876. Between 1876 and 1877, he studied at Leipzig University, after which he became an ordained deacon on July 11, 1877, and an ordained priest on September 29, 1878.

== Priesthood ==
His uncle, Dr. Alexander H. Vinton (1807-1881), had served as the second rector of Emmanuel Episcopal Church, Boston from 1869 to 1877. His namesake was appointed rector of Holy Communion Church in Norwood, New Jersey, where he served between 1877 and 1878. He served at Memorial Church of the Holy Comforter in Philadelphia, Pennsylvania from 1879 and at All Saints Church in Worcester, Massachusetts in 1884.

== Episcopacy ==
In 1902, Vinton was elected the first Bishop of Western Massachusetts after the diocese had split from the Diocese of Massachusetts in 1901. He was consecrated in All Saints Church in Worcester, Massachusetts on April 22, 1902, by Bishop Thomas Frederick Davies of Michigan. Vinton was elected a member of the American Antiquarian Society in 1903.
