= George S. Greene =

Union United States Army general

George Sears Greene
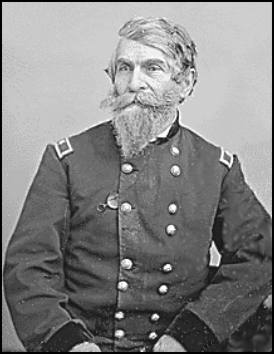
- Born: May 6, 1801; Apponaug, Rhode Island, US
- Died: January 28, 1899 (aged 97); Morristown, New Jersey, US
- Burial place: Greene Family Cemetery, Warwick, Rhode Island, US
- Military career
- Allegiance: United States; Union
- Branch: United States Army; Union Army
- Service years: 1823–1836; 1862–1866
- Rank: Brigadier General Brevet Major General
- Nicknames: Pap, Pappy, Old Man
- Commands: 60th New York Infantry Regiment; 3rd Brigade, 2nd Division, II Corps; 3rd Brigade, 3rd Division, XIV Corps
- Conflicts: American Civil War; Shenandoah Valley Campaign; First Battle of Winchester; Northern Virginia campaign; Battle of Cedar Mountain; First Battle of Rappahannock Station; Maryland campaign; Battle of Antietam; Battle of Chancellorsville; Gettysburg campaign; Battle of Gettysburg; Battle of Wauhatchie; Battle of Wyse Fork; The Capture of Raleigh

George Sears Greene (May 6, 1801 – January 28, 1899) was a civil engineer and a Union general during the American Civil War. He was part of the Greene family of Rhode Island, which had a record of distinguished military service to the United States. He first served in the Army from 1823 to 1836 after graduating second from his class at West Point. As a civilian, he was one of the founders of the American Society of Civil Engineers and Architects and was responsible for numerous railroads and aqueduct construction projects in the northeastern United States.

After 25 years as a civilian, he rejoined the Army to fight in the American Civil War. Despite his age, he quickly rose up the ranks and was appointed a brigadier general in early 1862. During the war, he took part in the Northern Virginia Campaign, the Battle of Antietam, and the Battle of Chancellorsville. His most notable contribution during the war was his defense of the Union right flank at Culp's Hill during the Battle of Gettysburg. He returned to engineering work after the war until his death in 1899.

== Early life ==
Greene was born in Apponaug, Rhode Island, one of nine children of Caleb and Sarah Robinson (Greene) Greene. His family had roots in the founding of Rhode Island and in the American Revolutionary War, including General Nathanael Greene, George's second cousin. Caleb was a financially shrewd ship owner and merchant, but the Embargo Act of 1807, which prohibited U.S. vessels from carrying goods to other countries, and the War of 1812 left his family in financial difficulties. Young George attended Wrentham Academy and then a Latin grammar school in Providence and hoped to attend Brown University there, but his impoverished father could not afford it, so he moved to New York City and found work in a dry goods store on Pearl Street.

In the New York store, Greene met Major Sylvanus Thayer, superintendent of the United States Military Academy, who recommended him to the Secretary of War for appointment to the academy. Greene entered West Point at age 18 and graduated second of 35 cadets in the class of 1823. Top graduates of the academy generally chose the Engineers as their branch, but Greene decided on the artillery and was commissioned a second lieutenant in the 3rd U.S. Artillery Regiment. However, due to his excellent academic performance, he stayed at the academy until 1827 as an assistant professor of mathematics and as a principal assistant professor of engineering. One of the students he taught during this period was Cadet Robert E. Lee.

In the summer of 1828 Greene married Mary Elizabeth Vinton, sister of his best friend at West Point, David Hammond Vinton. Elizabeth gave birth to three children over the next four years: Mary Vinton, George Sears, and Francis Vinton Greene. While assigned to Fort Sullivan in Eastport, Maine, in 1833, tragedy struck Greene's family: Elizabeth and all three of their children died within seven months, probably from tuberculosis. To ease the pain on his mind and to escape the isolation and loneliness of peacetime Army garrison duty, he immersed himself in study of both the law and medicine, coming close to professional certification in both by the time he resigned his commission in 1836 to become a civil engineer.

Greene built railroads in six states and designed municipal sewage and water systems for Washington, D.C., Detroit, and several other cities. In New York City, he designed the Croton Aqueduct reservoir in Central Park and the enlarged High Bridge over the Harlem River. He was one of twelve founders in New York City of the American Society of Civil Engineers and Architects. While on a trip to Maine for railroad surveying, he met Martha Barrett Dana, daughter of Samuel Dana, a prominent Massachusetts politician. They were married in Charlestown, Massachusetts, on February 21, 1837. They had six children together, including four sons (three of them later served in the military), one daughter, and one son who died in infancy.

== Civil War ==
Despite being over 60 years old and having been out of the Army for 25 years, the crisis of the Union compelled Greene to seek to rejoin the service. He was essentially apolitical and was not an abolitionist, but he was a firm believer in restoring the Union. He was appointed colonel of the 60th New York Volunteer Infantry on January 18, 1862. The regiment of upstate New Yorkers had been dissatisfied with their colonel and the company commanders had petitioned for his removal. Governor Edwin D. Morgan, although initially reluctant to appoint Greene because of his age, saw his 13 years of regular army experience as a solution to his political/military problem. During this period, Governor John A. Andrew of Massachusetts was also prepared to offer Greene a regiment, but Greene chose to serve New York. The officers of the 60th were dismayed when the elderly, gray-haired man reported for duty. They had requested that their lieutenant colonel be promoted, which would have raised many of them in rank themselves.

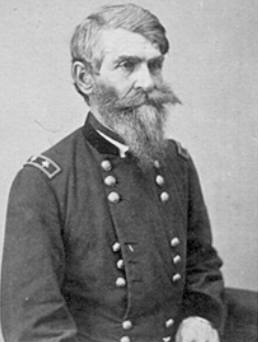
George S. Greene as a Brevet Major General

On April 28, 1862, Greene was appointed brigadier general of volunteers and served on the staff of Maj. Gen. Nathaniel Banks in the Shenandoah Valley campaign against Stonewall Jackson. At age 61, Greene was one of the oldest generals in the Union army and his troops took to calling him "Old Man" or "Pap" Greene. (There were actually 17 general officers in the Civil War older than Greene.) However, his age did not keep him from being one of the most aggressive commanders in the army. He commanded the 3rd Brigade, 2nd Division, II Corps, of the Army of Virginia at the Battle of Cedar Mountain during the Northern Virginia Campaign. Attacked by a Confederate force three times the size of his own, Greene and his men refused to give ground, holding out until the neighboring Union units were forced to withdraw. His division commander, Brig. Gen. John W. Geary, received a severe wound during the action and Greene took command of the division temporarily.

Greene was again temporarily elevated to command of his division, now designated part of the XII Corps of the Army of the Potomac, at the Battle of Antietam. His division's three brigades were led by junior officers who had survived Cedar Mountain. Even though XII Corps commander Brig. Gen. Joseph K. Mansfield was killed shortly after the fighting began, Greene led a crushing attack against the Confederates near the Dunker Church, achieving the farthest penetration of Maj. Gen. Stonewall Jackson's lines of any Union unit. Under immense pressure, Greene held his small division (only 1,727 men engaged at the start of the day) in advance of the rest of the army for four hours, but eventually withdrew after suffering heavy losses. While the division was posted to Harpers Ferry, Greene took a three-week sick leave. Maj. Gen. Oliver O. Howard speculated that Greene, like many of his fellow officers, was sickened by the stench of dead and wounded at Antietam. When he returned, there was a new division commander, Brig. Gen. Geary. Greene was disgruntled that Geary, with only a few days seniority over him, was selected for the post; Geary had been wounded at Cedar Mountain and his combat record was not as good, but his political connections and a sentiment that a wounded officer should not be set back in his career unnecessarily, gave him the nod.

Greene resumed command of the 3rd Brigade, which was involved in minor skirmishes in northern Virginia and not engaged at the Battle of Fredericksburg in December. At the Battle of Chancellorsville in May 1863, his brigade was in the center of the line. When the Union right—the XI Corps—collapsed, Greene's brigade was subjected to enfilade artillery fire and then infantry assaults. He had ordered his men to fortify their positions 200 yards (180 m) to their front using abatis and trenches and they were able to hold out against several Confederate assaults, although losing 528 men of 2,032 engaged. During part of the battle, Greene once again assumed temporary command of the division when Geary was wounded again.

=== Gettysburg ===
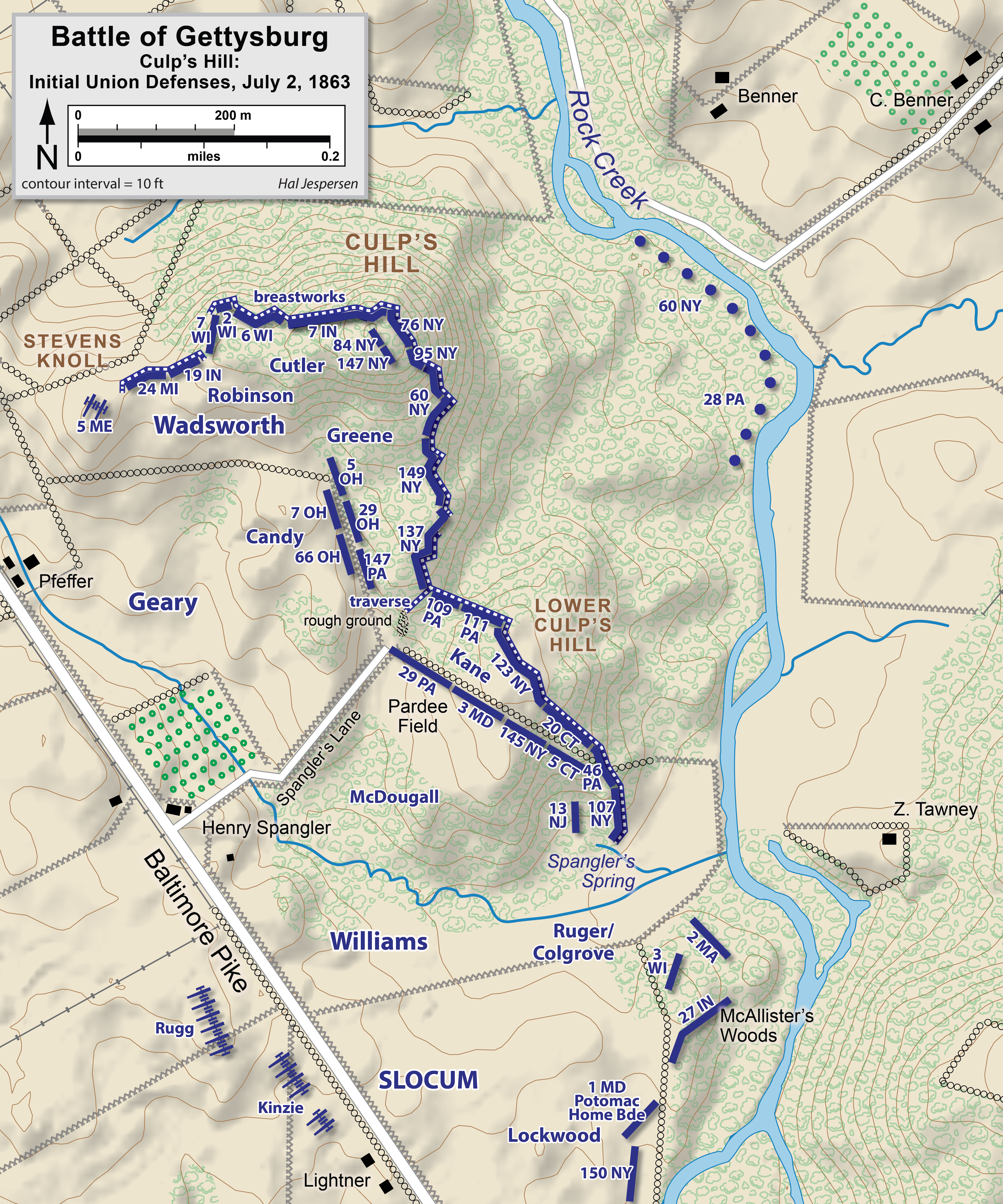
Culp's Hill defenses, afternoon, July 2

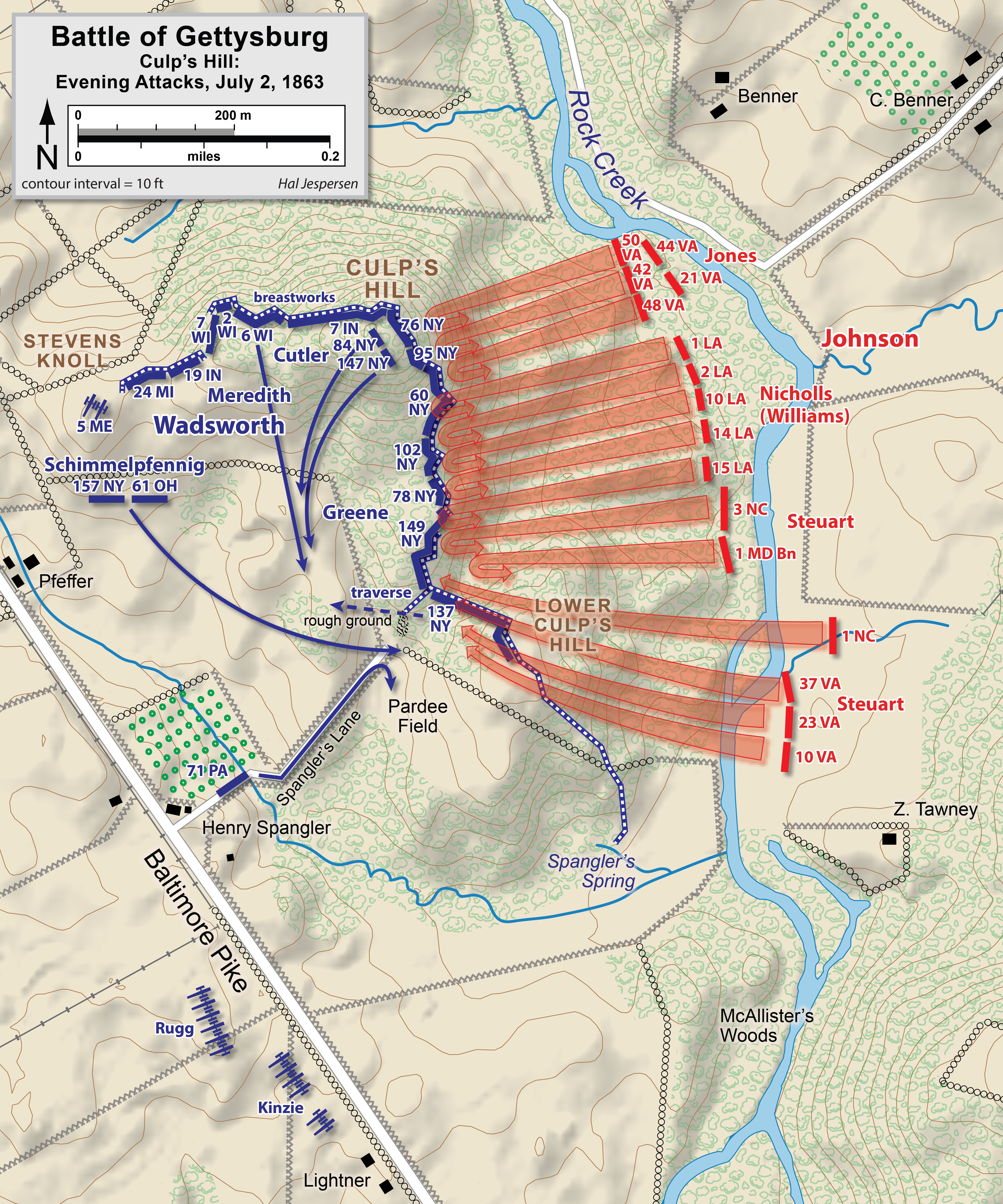
CSA Maj. General E. Johnson's attack, evening, July 2 Union Confederacy

The Battle of Gettysburg was the highlight of Greene's military career. On July 2, 1863, Maj. Gen. George G. Meade shifted almost the entire XII Corps from the Union right to strengthen the left flank, which was under heavy attack. Greene's lone brigade of 1,350 New Yorkers (five regiments) was left to defend a one-half-mile line on Culp's Hill when an entire Confederate division attacked. Fortunately, Greene had previously demonstrated good sense (as befits a civil engineer) by insisting that his troops construct strong field fortifications, despite a lack of interest in doing so from his division commander, Geary, and corps commander, Maj. Gen. Henry W. Slocum. In Greene's finest moment of the war, his preparations proved decisive and his brigade held off multiple attacks for hours. He was active throughout the engagement, rallying his men to defend their positions in the darkness. Brig. Gen. Alpheus Williams, acting corps commander on July 2, commended Greene for his "skill and judgment" in this defense, especially in his using the "advantages" of his position. Late at night, the rest of the XII Corps returned to Culp's Hill. The fighting resumed the next morning and raged for over seven hours, but the Union troops held Culp's Hill. They regained some of the lost ground and thwarted renewed Confederate attacks. The battle for Culp's Hill included the two oldest generals in each army, Greene at 62 and Brig. Gen. William "Extra Billy" Smith at 65.

The desperate fighting on the Union right flank was as important as the more famous defense of the Union left flank on July 2, by Col. Strong Vincent's brigade on Little Round Top. In fact, given that the Union line was only 400 yards (370 m) from the vital Union supply line on the Baltimore Pike, it can be argued that it was more important. However, Greene's contributions to this critical battle have never been widely heralded, principally because of a dispute between Meade and Slocum over the filing of their official reports. But a member of Greene's brigade wrote:

Had the breastworks not been built, and had there only been the thin line of our unprotected brigade, that line must have been swept away like leaves before the wind, by the oncoming of so heavy a mass of troops, and the [Baltimore] pike would have been reached by the enemy.

=== Western Theater ===
In the fall of 1863, the XII Corps was transferred to the West to reinforce the Union forces besieged at Chattanooga. At the Battle of Wauhatchie, during a surprise night attack by the Confederate forces, Greene was wounded in the face, with his jaw crushed and some teeth carried away. Subsequent surgery was not able to correct his condition and he suffered from the effects of his wound for the rest of his life. After six weeks of medical leave, he was assigned to light court-martial duty until January 1865, when he was sent to join Maj. Gen. William T. Sherman's army in North Carolina. Initially Greene voluntarily served on the staff of Maj. Gen. Jacob D. Cox participating in the battle at Kinston, where he had his horse shot out from under him. At the very end of the war Greene was in command of the 3rd Brigade in Absalom Baird's 3rd Division, XIV Corps, and participated in the capture of Raleigh and the pursuit of Gen. Joseph E. Johnston's army until its surrender.

== Postbellum career ==
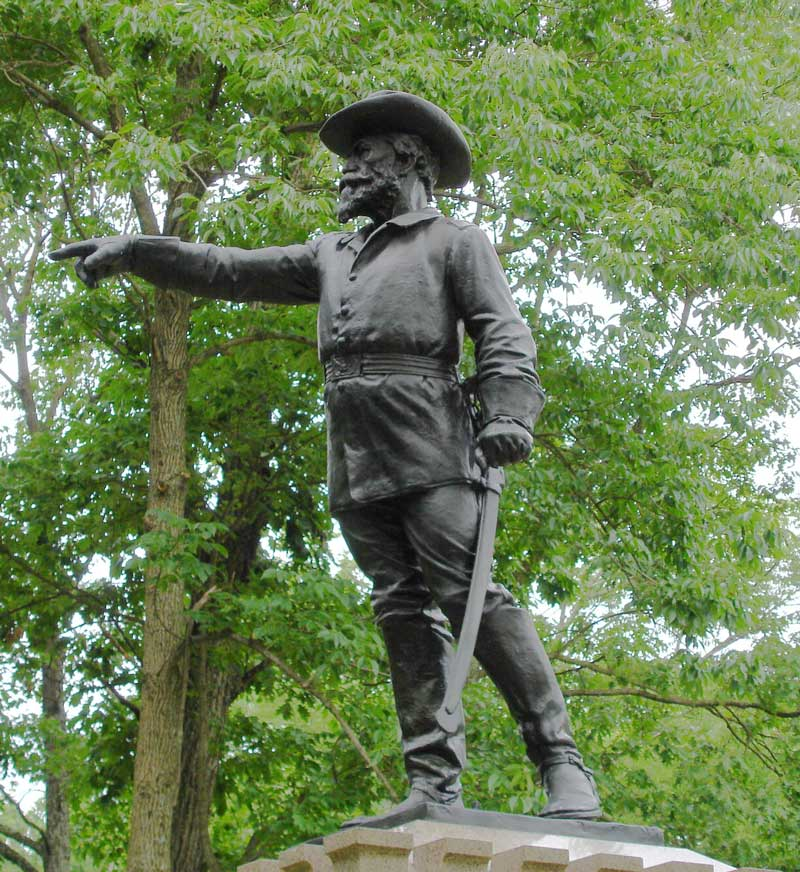
Monument to Greene on Culp's Hill at Gettysburg National Military Park

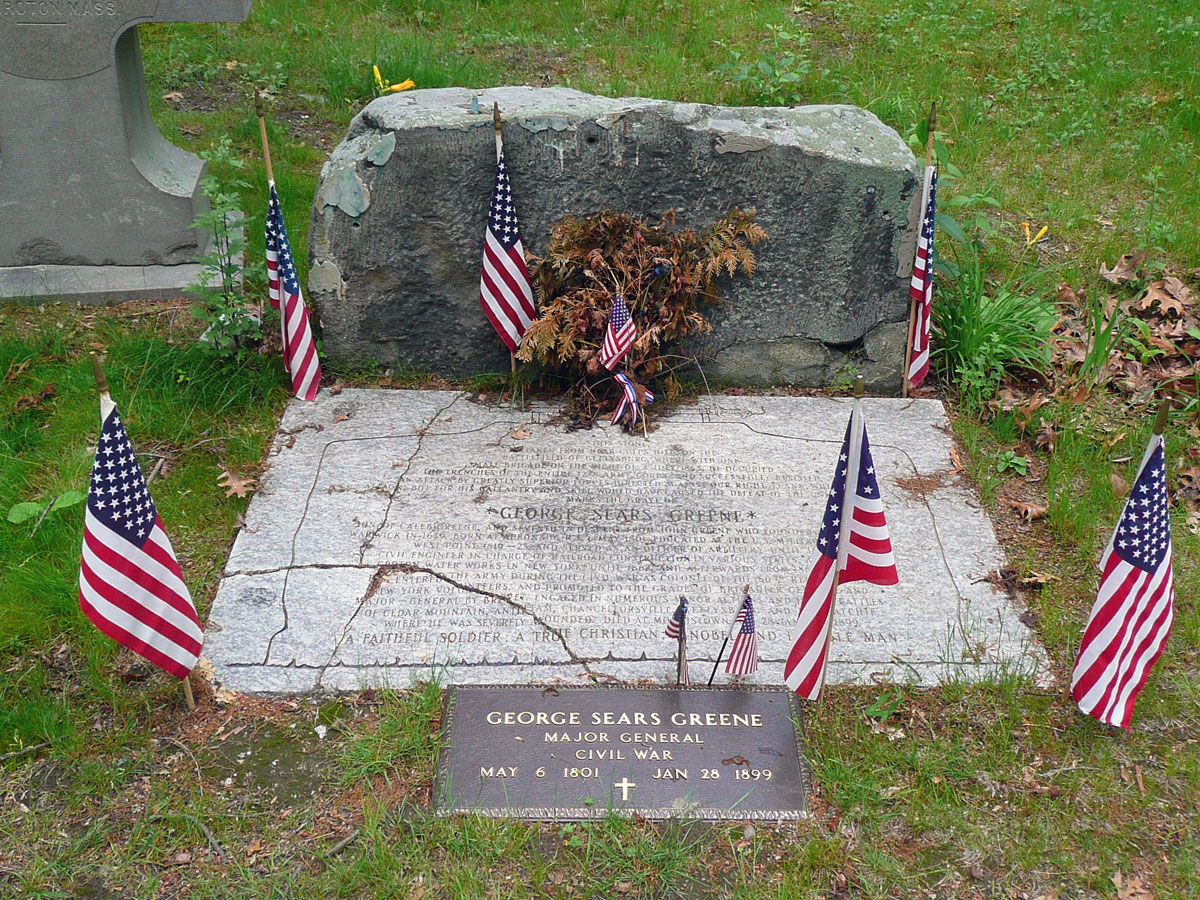
Greene's gravesite

After the war, Greene served on court-martial duty for a year and then returned to civil engineering in New York and Washington, D.C. From 1867 to 1871 he was the chief engineer commissioner of the Croton Aqueduct Department in New York. At the age of 86, he inspected the entire 30-mile Croton Aqueduct structure on foot. He served as president of the American Society of Civil Engineers from 1875 to 1877 and president of the New York Genealogical and Biographical Society. He was appointed to West Point's Board of Visitors in 1881.

By 1892, Greene was the oldest surviving Union general and the oldest living graduate of West Point. He petitioned the United States Congress for an engineer captain's pension that would be of help to his family after his death. The best that Congress was willing to do was arranged by Congressman and Gettysburg veteran Daniel E. Sickles of New York, a first lieutenant's pension, based on the highest rank Greene had achieved in the regular army. On August 18, 1894, Greene took the oath of office as a first lieutenant of artillery and became, at 93, the oldest lieutenant in the U.S. Army for 48 hours. Veterans in the Military Order of the Loyal Legion of the United States (MOLLUS) declared that he was the oldest lieutenant in world history.

== Legacy ==
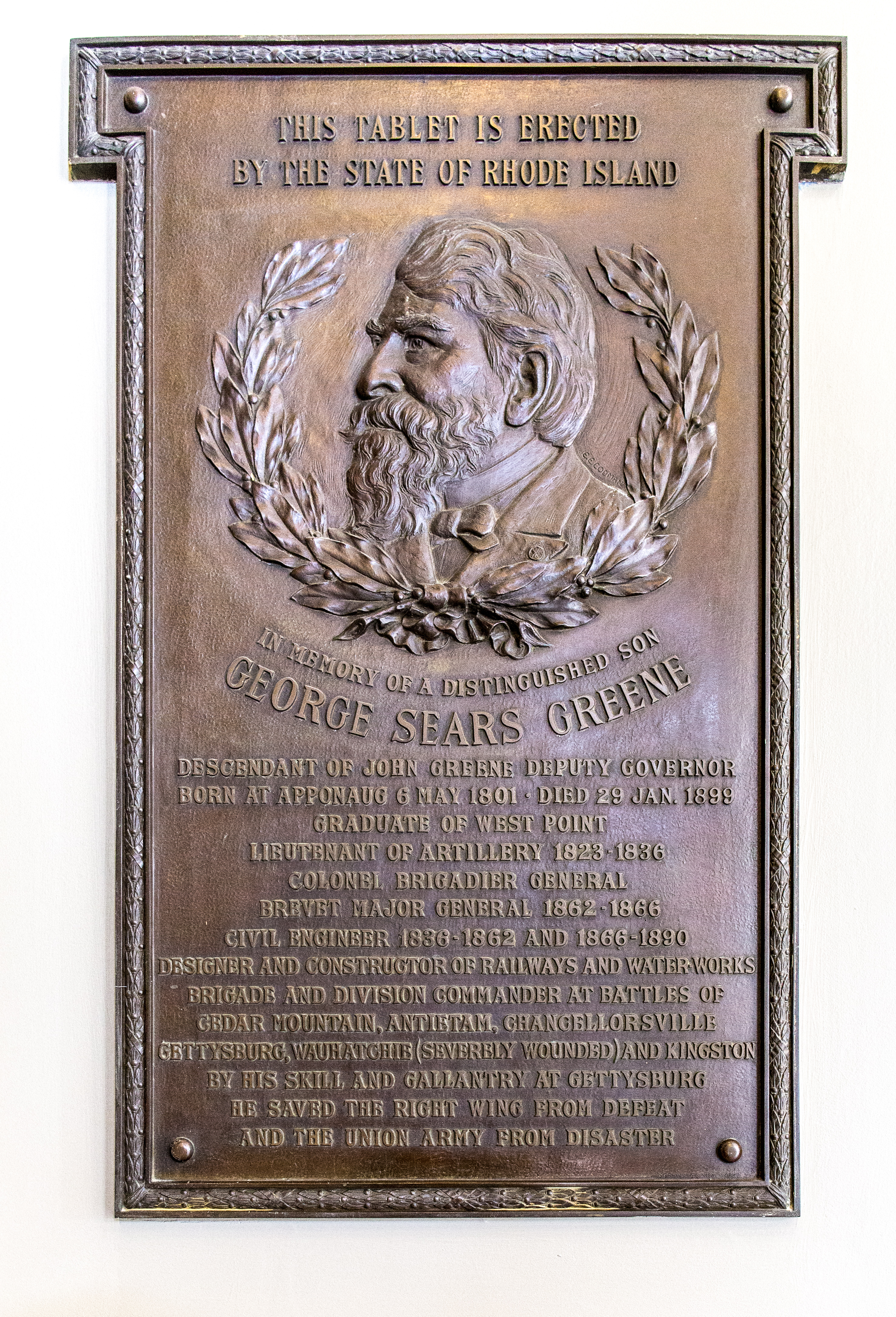
Memorial plaque in the Rhode Island State House

Greene died at age 97 in Morristown, New Jersey, and was buried in the Greene family cemetery in Warwick, Rhode Island, with a two-ton boulder from Culp's Hill placed above his grave. He is memorialized with a statue erected in 1906 by the State of New York on Culp's Hill in Gettysburg National Military Park.

Greene's wife Martha died in 1883 at an age of 74. Their oldest son, Lieutenant Samuel Dana Greene, was the executive officer on the ironclad ship USS Monitor during the Battle of Hampton Roads. Another of their sons, Francis V. Greene, commanded a brigade at the Battle of Manila during the Spanish–American War. A third, Charles Thurston Greene, was a lieutenant on his father's staff at Culp's Hill. Later in 1863, Charles was wounded by an artillery shell and his leg was amputated, but he remained on active service until 1870. George Sears Greene, Jr., volunteered to serve but was not allowed to do so by his father so he could survive and carry on the family name.

A memorial tablet honoring Greene was approved by the Rhode Island General Assembly in 1910 at a sum of 460 dollars. The bronze plaque hangs inside the south entrance of the Rhode Island State House.

A description of George Sears Greene from Lt. George K. Collins of the 149th New York Infantry sums up the general:

He was a West Point graduate, about 60 years old, thick set, five feet ten inches high, dark complexioned, iron gray hair, full gray beard and mustache, gruff in manner and stern in appearance, but with all an excellent officer and under a rough exterior possessing a kind heart. In the end the men learned to love and respect him as much as in the beginning they feared him, and this was saying a good deal on the subject. He knew how to drill, how to command, and in the hour of peril how to care for his command, and the men respected him accordingly.

— Lt. George K. Collins

== See also ==
- List of American Civil War generals (Union)
- Caleb Greene House
