= USS Monitor =

First ironclad of the US Navy, 1861–1862

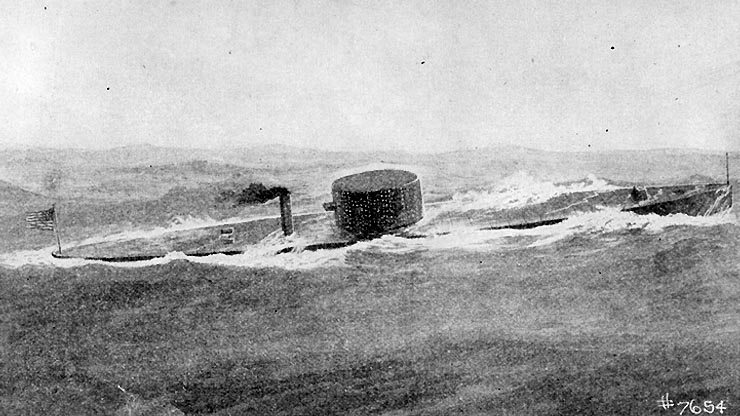
- A drawing of Monitor at sea

History

United States
- Name: Monitor
- Ordered: 4 October 1861
- Builder: Continental Iron Works, Greenpoint, Brooklyn
- Cost: $275,000
- Laid down: 25 October 1861
- Launched: 30 January 1862
- Commissioned: 25 February 1862
- Fate: Lost at sea during a storm, 31 December 1862 (off Cape Hatteras, North Carolina)
- Status: Wreck located 27 August 1973, partially salvaged

General characteristics
- Type: Monitor
- Displacement: 987 long tons (1,003 t)
- Tons burthen: 776 tons (bm)
- Length: 179 ft (54.6 m)
- Beam: 41 ft 6 in (12.6 m)
- Draft: 10 ft 6 in (3.2 m)
- Installed power: 2 × fire-tube boilers; 320 ihp (240 kW)
- Propulsion: 1 × vibrating-lever steam engine; 1 × propeller shaft
- Speed: 6 knots (11 km/h; 6.9 mph)
- Complement: 49 officers and enlisted men
- Armament: 2 × 11 in (280 mm) smoothbore Dahlgren guns
- Armor: Gun turret: 8 in (203 mm); Waterline belt: 3–5 in (76–127 mm); Deck: 1 in (25 mm); Pilot house: 9 in (229 mm)
- USS Monitor
- U.S. National Register of Historic Places
- U.S. National Historic Landmark
- Location within North Carolina Location within the United States
- Nearest city: Cape Hatteras, North Carolina
- Area: 9.9 acres (4.0 ha)
- Built: 1861–1862
- Architect: John Ericsson
- Architectural style: Ironclad warship
- NRHP reference No.: 74002299

Significant dates
- Added to NRHP: 11 October 1974
- Designated NHL: 23 June 1986

USS Monitor was an ironclad warship built for the United States Navy during the American Civil War and completed in early 1862, becoming the first such ship commissioned by the Navy. (Note: The first ironclad warship commissioned by the United States was the wooden-hulled City-class ironclad USS Carondelet commissioned on 15 January 1862. She was manned by Union Navy officers and enlisted personnel and supervised by the United States Department of the Navy, but the construction of the Western Gunboat Flotilla in the Western Theater was funded by the U.S. War Department, and at her commissioning the Carondelet was Union Army (United States Army) owned, rather than U.S. Navy property.) Monitor played a central role in the Battle of Hampton Roads on 9 March under the command of Lieutenant John L. Worden, where she fought the casemate ironclad CSS Virginia, built on the hull of the scuttled steam frigate USS Merrimack, to a stalemate. The design of the ship was distinguished by its revolving turret, which was designed by American inventor Theodore Timby; it was quickly duplicated and established the monitor class and type of armored warship built for the American Navy over the next several decades.

The remainder of the ship was designed by Swedish-born engineer and inventor John Ericsson, and built in 101 days in Brooklyn, New York, on the East River beginning in late 1861. Monitor presented a new concept in ship design and employed a variety of new inventions and innovations in ship building that caught the attention of the world. The impetus to build Monitor was prompted by the news that the Confederates had raised the scuttled Merrimack and were building an iron-plated armored vessel named the Virginia on her hull in the old Federal naval shipyard at Gosport, near Norfolk, that could effectively engage the Union ships blockading Hampton Roads harbor and the James River leading northwest to Richmond, capital of the Confederacy.

They could ultimately advance unchallenged on Washington, D.C., up the Potomac River and other seacoast cities. Before Monitor could reach Hampton Roads, the Confederate ironclad had already destroyed the sail frigates USS Cumberland and USS Congress and had run the steam frigate USS Minnesota aground. That night, Monitor arrived and, just as Virginia set to finish off Minnesota and St. Lawrence on the second day, the new Union ironclad confronted the Confederate ship, preventing her from wreaking further destruction on the wooden Union ships. A four-hour battle ensued, each ship pounding the other with close-range cannon fire, although neither ship could destroy or seriously damage the other. This was the first battle fought between armored warships and marked a turning point in naval warfare.

The Confederates were forced to scuttle and destroy Virginia as they withdrew in early May 1862 from Norfolk and its naval shipyard, while Monitor sailed up the James River to support the Union Army during the Peninsula Campaign under General-in-Chief George B. McClellan. The ship participated in the Battle of Drewry's Bluff later that month, and remained in the area giving support to General McClellan's forces on land until she was ordered to join the Union Navy blockaders off North Carolina in December. On her way there, she foundered while under tow during a storm off Cape Hatteras on the last day of the year. Monitor's wreck was discovered in 1973 and has been partially salvaged. Her guns, gun turret, engine, and other relics are on display at the Mariners' Museum in Newport News, Virginia, a few miles from the site of her most important military action.

== Conception ==
While the concept of ships protected by armor existed before the advent of the ironclad Monitor, the need for iron plating on ship arose only after the explosive shell-firing Paixhans gun was introduced to naval warfare in the 1820s. The use of heavy iron plating on the sides of warships was not practical until steam propulsion matured enough to carry its great weight. Developments in gun technology had progressed by the 1840s so that no practical thickness of wood could withstand the power of a shell.

In response, the United States began construction in 1854 of a steam-powered ironclad warship, Stevens Battery, but work was delayed and the designer, Robert Stevens, died in 1856, stalling further work. Since there was no pressing need for such a ship at the time, there was little demand to continue work on the unfinished vessel. It was France that introduced the first operational armored ships as well as the first shell guns and rifled cannons.

Experience during the Crimean War of 1854–1855 showed that armored ships could withstand repeated hits without significant damage when French ironclad floating batteries defeated Russian coastal fortifications during the Battle of Kinburn. Ericsson claimed to have sent the French Emperor Napoléon III a proposal for a monitor-type design, with a gun turret, in September 1854, but no record of any such submission could be found in the archives of the French Ministry of the Navy (Ministre de la Marine) when they were searched by naval historian James Phinney Baxter III. The French followed those ships with the first ocean-going ironclad, the armored frigate Gloire in 1859, and the British responded with HMS Warrior.

The Union Navy's attitude towards ironclads changed quickly when it was learned that the Confederates were converting the captured USS Merrimack to an ironclad at the naval shipyard in Norfolk, Virginia. Subsequently, the urgency of Monitor's completion and deployment to Hampton Roads was driven by fears of what the Confederate ironclad, now renamed Virginia, would be capable of doing, not only to Union ships but to cities along the coast and riverfronts. Northern newspapers published daily accounts of the Confederates' progress in converting the Merrimack to an ironclad; this prompted the Union Navy to complete and deploy Monitor as soon as possible.

Word of Merrimack's reconstruction and conversion was confirmed in the North in late February 1862 when Mary Louvestre of Norfolk, a free African-American woman who worked as a housekeeper for one of the Confederate engineers working on Merrimack, made her way through Confederate lines with news that the Confederates were building an ironclad warship. Concealed in her dress was a message from a Union sympathizer who worked in the Navy Yard warning that the former Merrimack, renamed Virginia by the Confederates, was nearing completion. (Note: Accounts vary. Some sources claim she stole and was carrying the ship's plans, rather than a letter from a third party.) Upon her arrival in Washington Louvestre managed to meet with Secretary of the Navy Gideon Welles and informed him that the Confederates were nearing the completion of their ironclad, which surprised Welles. Convinced by the papers Louvestre was carrying, he had production of Monitor sped up. Welles later recorded in his memoirs that "Mrs. Louvestre encountered no small risk in bringing this information ...".

== Approval ==
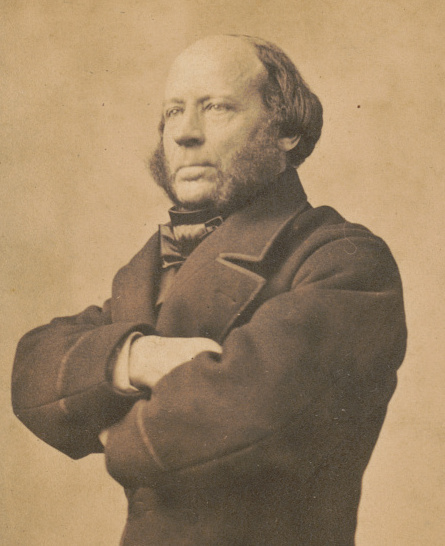
John Ericsson designed Monitor.

After the United States received word of the construction of Virginia, Congress appropriated $1.5 million on 3 August 1861 to build one or more armored steamships. It also ordered the creation of a board to inquire into the various designs proposed for armored ships. The Union Navy advertised for proposals for "iron-clad steam vessels of war" on 7 August and Welles appointed three senior officers as the Ironclad Board the following day. Their task was to "examine plans for the completion of iron-clad vessels" and consider its costs. (Note: Members of the Ironclad board included Commodores Joseph Smith, Hiram Paulding and Charles H. Davis. The board lacked experienced shipbuilders but was compensated by the fact that two of the members had years of shipyard experience.)

Ericsson originally made no submission to the board, but became involved when Cornelius Bushnell, the sponsor of the proposal that became the armored sloop USS Galena, needed to have his design reviewed by a naval constructor. The board required a guarantee from Bushnell that his ship would float despite the weight of its armor and Cornelius H. DeLamater of New York City recommended that Bushnell consult with his friend Ericsson. The two first met on 9 September and again on the following day, after Ericsson had time to evaluate Galena's design.

During this second meeting, Ericsson showed Bushnell a model of his own design, the future Monitor, derived from his 1854 design. Bushnell got Ericsson's permission to show the model to Welles, who told Bushnell to show it to the board. Upon review of Ericsson's unusual design, the board was skeptical, concerned that such a vessel would not float, especially in rough seas, and rejected the proposal of a completely iron laden ship.

President Lincoln, who had also examined the design, overruled them. Ericsson assured the board his ship would float exclaiming, "The sea shall ride over her and she shall live in it like a duck". On 15 September, after further deliberations, the board accepted Ericsson's proposal. The Ironclad Board evaluated 17 different designs, but recommended only three for procurement on 16 September, including Ericsson's Monitor design.

The three ironclad ships selected differed substantially in design and degree of risk. Monitor was the most innovative design by virtue of its low freeboard, shallow-draft iron hull, and total dependence on steam power. The riskiest element of its design was its rotating gun turret, something that had not previously been tested by any navy. (Note: British trials of a turret designed by Captain Cowper Coles on board the floating battery HMS Trusty began the same month.) Ericsson's guarantee of delivery in 100 days proved to be decisive in choosing his design despite the risk involved.

== Design and description ==
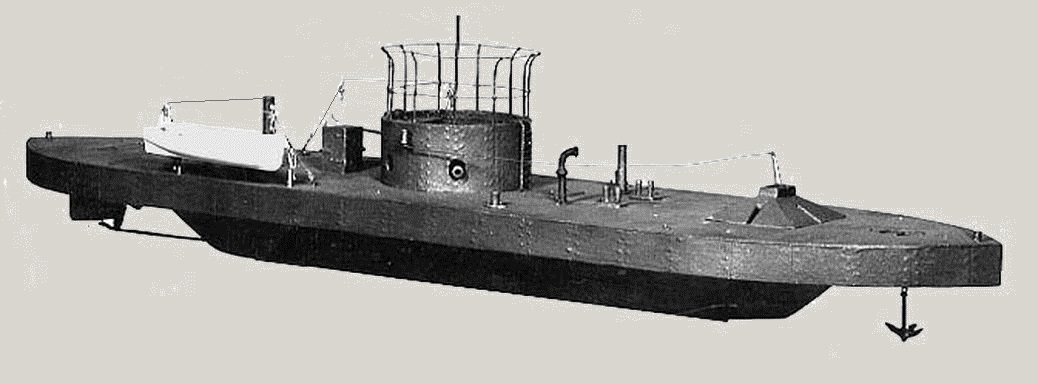
A model of Monitor

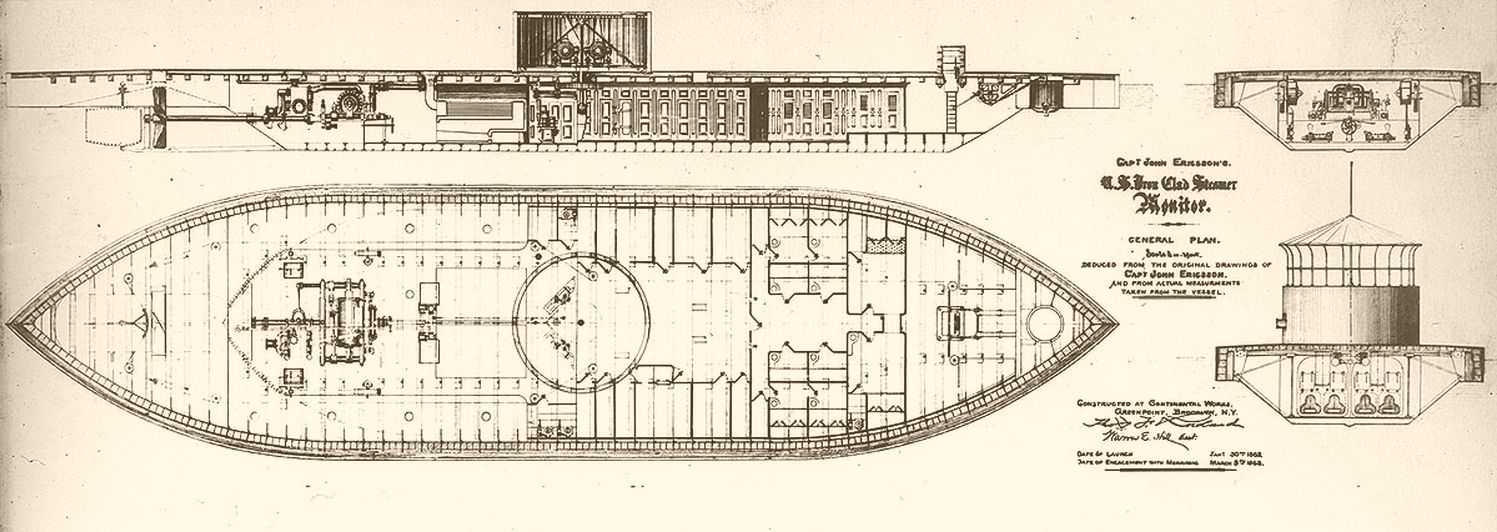
Inboard plans of Monitor

Monitor was an unusual vessel in almost every respect and was sometimes sarcastically described by the press and other critics as "Ericsson's folly", "cheesebox on a raft" and the "Yankee cheesebox". The most prominent feature on the vessel was a large cylindrical gun turret mounted amidships above the low-freeboard upper hull, also called the "raft". This extended well past the sides of the lower, more traditionally shaped hull. A small armored pilot house was fitted on the upper deck towards the bow. Its position prevented Monitor from firing her guns straight forward. (Note: Ericsson later admitted that this was a serious flaw in the ship's design and that the pilot house should have been placed atop the turret.)

One of Ericsson's prime goals in designing the ship was to present the smallest possible target to enemy gunfire. The ship was 179 feet (54.6 m) long overall, had a beam of 41 feet 6 inches (12.6 m) and had a maximum draft of 10 feet 6 inches (3.2 m). Monitor had a tonnage of 776 tons burthen and displaced 987 long tons (1,003 t). Her crew consisted of 49 officers and enlisted men.

External videos
- Working model of vibrating-lever engine of USS Monitor

The ship was powered by a two-cylinder horizontal vibrating-lever steam engine, also designed by Ericsson, which drove a 9-foot (2.7 m) propeller, whose shaft was nine inches in diameter. The engine used steam generated by two horizontal fire-tube boilers at a maximum pressure of 40 psi (276 kPa; 3 kgf/cm^{2}). The 320-indicated-horsepower (240 kW) engine was designed to give the ship a top speed of 8 knots (15 km/h; 9.2 mph), but Monitor was 1–2 knots (1.9–3.7 km/h; 1.2–2.3 mph) slower in service. The engine had a bore of 36 inches (914 mm) and a stroke of 22 inches (559 mm). The ship carried 100 long tons (100 t) of coal. Ventilation for the vessel was supplied by two centrifugal blowers near the stern, each of which was powered by a 6-horsepower (4.5 kW) steam engine. One fan circulated air throughout the ship, but the other one forced air through the boilers, which depended on this forced draught. Leather belts connected the blowers to their engines and they would stretch when wet, often disabling the fans and boilers. The ship's pumps were steam operated and water would accumulate in the ship if the pumps could not get enough steam to work.

Monitor's turret measured 20 ft (6.1 m) in diameter and 9 ft (2.7 m) high, constructed with 8 inches (20 cm) of armor (11 inches in front at the gun ports) rendering the overall vessel somewhat top heavy. Recent research has proposed that the additional three inches of armor in front of the gun ports resulted from an armored shield attached to the front of the turret during the Battle of Hampton Roads. Its rounded shape helped to deflect cannon shot. A pair of steam-powered donkey engines rotated the turret through a set of gears; a full rotation was made in 22.5 seconds during testing on 9 February 1862. Fine control of the turret proved to be difficult; as there was no brake the steam engines would have to be placed in reverse if the turret overshot its mark, or another full rotation would have to be made. The only way to see out of the turret was through the gun ports; when the guns were not in use, or withdrawn for reloading during battle, heavy iron port stoppers would swing down into place to close the gunports. Including the guns, the turret weighed approximately 160 long tons (163 t); the entire weight rested on an iron spindle that had to be jacked up using a wedge before the turret could rotate. The spindle was 9 inches (23 cm) in diameter which gave it ten times the strength needed in preventing the turret from sliding sideways. When not in use, the turret rested on a brass ring on the deck that was intended to form a watertight seal. In service, however, this proved to leak heavily, despite caulking by the crew. The gap between the turret and the deck proved to be a problem as debris and shell fragments entered the gap and jammed the turrets of several Passaic-class monitors, which used the same turret design, during the First Battle of Charleston Harbor in April 1863. Direct hits on the turret with heavy shot could bend the spindle, which could also jam the turret. To gain access to the turret from below, or to hoist up powder and shot during battle, the turret had to rotate to face starboard, which would line up the entry hatch in the floor of the turret with an opening in the deck below. The roof of the turret was lightly built to facilitate any needed exchange of the ship's guns and to improve ventilation, with only gravity holding the roof plates in place.

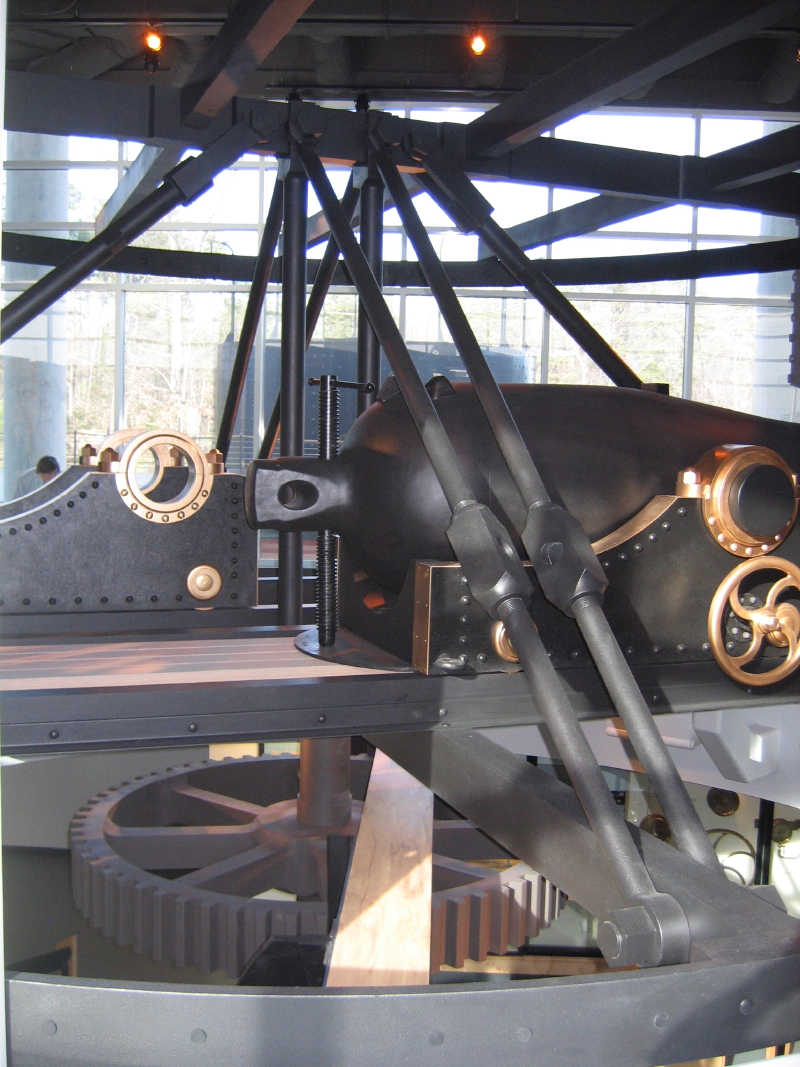
A side view of the cutaway replica of the turret in the Mariners' Museum, with only one 11-inch (280 mm) Dahlgren gun mounted

The turret was intended to mount a pair of 15-inch (380 mm) smoothbore Dahlgren guns, but they were not ready in time and 11-inch (280 mm) guns were substituted, weighing approximately 16,000 pounds (7,300 kg) each. Monitor's guns used the standard propellant charge of 15 pounds (6.8 kg) specified by the 1860 ordnance for targets "distant", "near", and "ordinary", established by the gun's designer Dahlgren himself. They could fire a 136-pound (61.7 kg) round shot or shell up to a range of 3,650 yards (3,340 m) at an elevation of +15°.

The top of the armored deck was only about 18 inches (460 mm) above the waterline. It was protected by two layers of 1/2-inch (13 mm) wrought iron armor. The sides of the "raft" consisted of three to five layers of 1-inch (25 mm) iron plates, backed by about 30 inches (762 mm) of pine and oak. Three of the plates extended the full 60-inch (1,524 mm) height of the side, but the two innermost plates did not extend all the way down. Ericsson originally intended to use either six 1-inch plates or a single outer 4-inch (100 mm) plate backed by three 3/4-inch (19 mm) plates, but the thicker plate required too much time to roll. The two innermost plates were riveted together while the outer plates were bolted to the inner ones. A ninth plate, only 3/4 inch (19 mm) thick and 15 inches (381 mm) wide, was bolted over the butt joints of the innermost layer of armor. Glass portholes in the deck provided natural light for the interior of the ship; in action these were covered by iron plates.

After the duel between the two ironclads at Hampton Roads there was concern by some Navy officials who witnessed the battle that Monitor's design might allow for easy boarding by the Confederates. In a letter dated 27 April 1862 Lieutenant Commander O.C. Badger wrote to Lieutenant H. A. Wise, Assistant Inspector of Ordnance, advising the use of "liquid fire", scalding water from the boiler through hoses and pipes, sprayed out via the vents and pilothouse window, to repel enemy boarders.

Wise was aboard and inspected Monitor after the battle, responded in a letter of 30 April 1862: "With reference to the Monitor, the moment I jumped on board of her after the fight I saw that a steam tug with twenty men could have taken the upper part of her in as many seconds ... I hear that hot water pipes are arranged so as to scald the assailants when they may dare to set foot on her." The chance to employ such a tactic never arose. There are conflicting accounts as to whether such an anti-personnel provision was installed.

== Construction ==
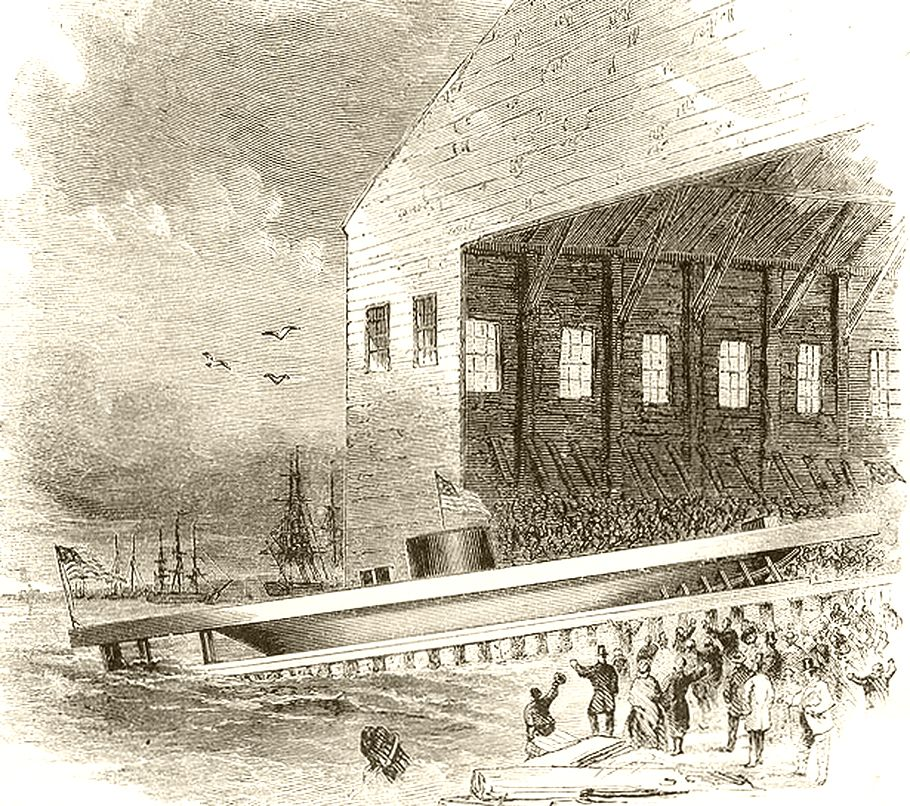
The launch of Monitor, 1862

Commodore Joseph Smith, Chief of the Bureau of Yards and Docks, sent Ericsson formal notice of the acceptance of his proposal on 21 September 1861. Six days later, Ericsson signed a contract with Bushnell, John F. Winslow and John A. Griswold which stated that the four partners would equally share in the profits or the losses incurred by the construction of the ironclad. There was one major delay over the signing of the actual contract with the government. Welles insisted that if Monitor did not prove to be a "complete success", the builders would have to refund every cent to the government. Winslow balked at this draconian provision and had to be persuaded by his partners to sign after the Navy rejected his attempt to amend the contract. The contract was finally signed on 4 October for a price of $275,000 to be paid in installments as work progressed.

Preliminary work had begun well before that date, and Ericsson's consortium contracted with Thomas F. Rowland of the Continental Iron Works at Bushwick Inlet, in modern-day Greenpoint, Brooklyn, on 25 October for construction of Monitor's hull. Her keel was laid the same day. The turret was built and assembled at the Novelty Iron Works in Manhattan, disassembled and shipped to Bushwick Inlet where it was reassembled. The ship's steam engines and machinery were constructed at the DeLamater Iron Works, also in Manhattan. Chief Engineer Alban C. Stimers, who once served aboard Merrimack, was appointed Superintendent of the ship while she was undergoing construction. Although never formally assigned to the crew, he remained aboard her as an inspector during her maiden voyage and battle.

Construction progressed in fits and starts, plagued by a number of short delays in the delivery of iron and occasional shortages of cash, but they did not delay the ship's progress by more than a few weeks. The hundred days allotted for her construction passed on 12 January, but the Navy chose not to penalize the consortium. The name "Monitor", meaning "one who admonishes and corrects wrongdoers", was proposed by Ericsson on 20 January 1862 and approved by Assistant Secretary of the Navy Gustavus Fox. While Ericsson stood on its deck in defiance of all his critics who thought she would never float, Monitor was launched on 30 January 1862 to the cheers of the watching crowd, even those who had bet that the ship would sink straight to the bottom. She was commissioned on 25 February.

Even before Monitor was commissioned, she ran an unsuccessful set of sea trials on 19 February. Valve problems with the main engine and one of the fan engines prevented her from reaching the Brooklyn Navy Yard from Bushwick Inlet and she had to be towed there the next day. These issues were easily fixed and Monitor was ordered to sail for Hampton Roads on 26 February, but her departure had to be delayed one day to load ammunition. On the morning of 27 February the ship entered the East River preparatory to leaving New York, but proved to be all but unsteerable and had to be towed back to the navy yard. Upon examination, the steering gear controlling the rudder had been improperly installed and Rowland offered to realign the rudder, which he estimated to take only a day. Ericsson, however, preferred to revise the steering gear by adding an extra set of pulleys as he believed it would take less time. His modification proved to be successful during trials on 4 March.

Gunnery trials were successfully performed the previous day, although Stimers twice nearly caused disasters as he did not understand how the recoil mechanism worked on Ericsson's carriage for the 11-inch guns. Instead of tightening them to reduce the recoil upon firing, he loosened them so that both guns struck the back of the turret, fortunately without hurting anybody or damaging the guns.

Monitor employed over forty patented inventions and marked a significant departure from the dominant naval vessels of the time. Ericsson's innovative turret design, although not without flaws, facilitated the widespread adoption of rotating guns on warships in navies worldwide. Because Monitor was an experimental craft, urgently needed, hurriedly constructed, and almost immediately put to sea, a number of problems were discovered during her maiden voyage to Hampton Roads and during the battle there. Yet she was still able to challenge Virginia and prevent her from further destroying the remaining ships in the Union flotilla blockading Hampton Roads.

During the "boom time" of the Civil War, Ericsson could have made a fortune with his inventions used in Monitor, but instead gave the U.S. government all his Monitor patent rights saying it was his "contribution to the glorious Union cause".

== Crew ==
The officers at the time of Monitor's commissioning were:

Officers of USS Monitor at commissioning (25 February 1862)
Lieutenant John Lorimer Worden, Commanding Officer
Lieutenant Samuel Greene, Executive Officer	Third Assistant Engineer, Robinson W. Hands
Acting Master, Louis N. Stodder	Fourth Assistant Engineer, Mark T. Sunstrom
Acting Master, J.N. Webber	Acting Assistant Paymaster, William F. Keeler
First Assistant Engineer, Isaac Newton Jr.	Acting Assistant Surgeon, Daniel C. Logue
Second Assistant Engineer, Albert B. Campbell

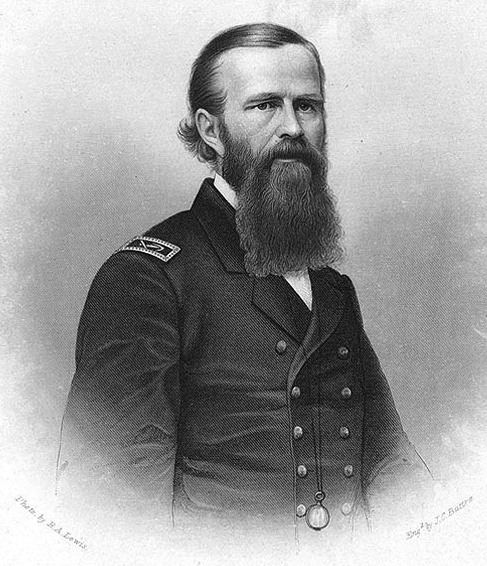
Commander Worden in 1862

Monitor's crew were all volunteers and totaled 49 officers and enlisted men. The ship required ten officers: a commander, an executive officer, four engineers, one medical officer, two masters and a paymaster. Before Worden was allowed to select, assemble, and commit a crew to Monitor, the vessel had to be completed.

Four of the officers were line officers and responsible for the handling of the vessel and operation of guns during battle, while the engineering officers were considered a class unto themselves. In Monitor's turret, Greene and Stodder supervised loading and firing of the two eleven-inch (280 mm) Dahlgrens. Each gun was crewed by eight men. In Worden's report of 27 January 1862 to Welles, he stated he believed 17 men and 2 officers would be the maximum number in the turret that allowed the crew to work without getting in each other's way.

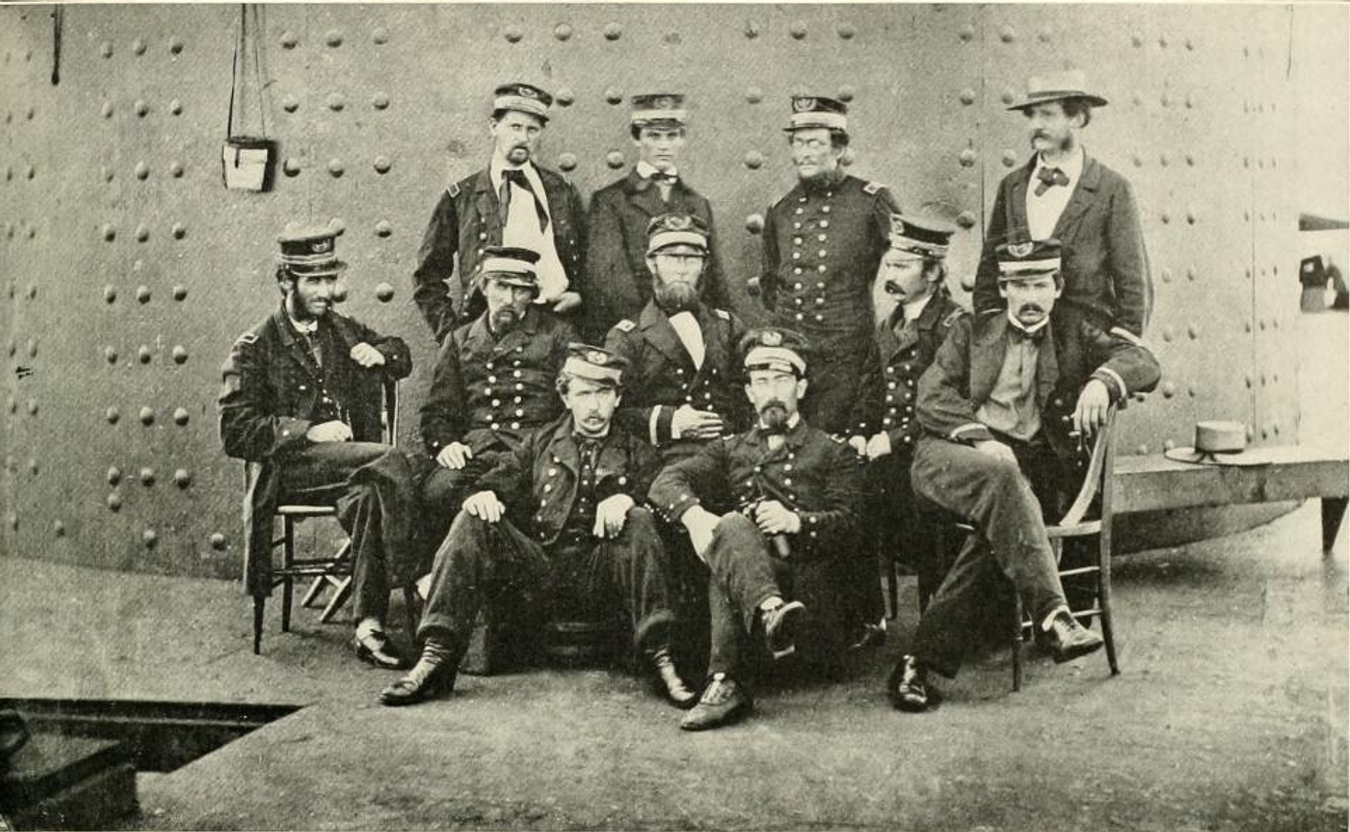
USS Monitor officers on deck, posed by her armored gun turret, while the ship was in the James River, Virginia, 9 July 1862. The US Navy Library identifies them as: Top row, left to right: Second Assistant Engineer Albert B. Campbell · Third Assistant Engineer Mark Trueman Sunstrom · Acting Assistant Paymaster William F. Keeler · Lieutenant L. Howard Newman (Executive Officer of USS Galena) Middle row, left to right: Acting Master Louis N. Stodder · Master's Mate George Frederickson · Acting Volunteer Lieutenant William Flye · Acting Assistant Surgeon Daniel C. Logue · Lieutenant Samuel Greene. Seated on deck in front, left to right: Third Assistant Engineer Robinson W. Hands · Acting Master E.V. Gager. A similar photograph shows Monitor officer First Assistant Engineer Isaac Newton.

Monitor also required petty officers: among them was Daniel Toffey, Worden's nephew. Worden had selected Toffey to serve as his captain's clerk. Two black Americans were also among the enlisted men in the crew.

Living quarters for the senior officers consisted of eight separate well-furnished cabins, each provided with a small oak table and chair, an oil lamp, shelves and drawers and a canvas floor covering covered with a rug. The entire crew were given goat-skin mats to sleep on. Lighting for each living area was provided by small skylights in the deck above, which were covered by an iron hatch during battle. The officer's wardroom was located forward of the berth deck where officers would eat their meals, hold meetings or socialize during what little spare time they had. It was well furnished with an oriental rug, a large oak table and other such items. Ericsson had personally paid for the costs of all the officer's furnishings.

Many details of Monitor's history and insights of everyday crew life have been discovered from correspondence sent from the various crew members to family and friends while serving aboard the ironclad. In particular the correspondence of George S. Geer, who sent more than 80 letters, often referred to as The Monitor Chronicles, (Note: See Bibliography: Marvel, William, ed. (2000). The Monitor Chronicles: One Sailor's Account ...) to his wife Martha during the entire time of Monitor's service provide many details and insights into every chapter of the ironclad's short-lived history, offering a rare perspective of a sailor's experience on the naval front during the Civil War. The letters of Acting Paymaster William F. Keeler to his wife Anna also corroborate many of the accounts of affairs that took place aboard Monitor. The letters of Geer and Keeler are available for viewing and are housed at the Mariners' Museum in Virginia. Other crew members were interviewed later in life, like Louis N. Stodder, one of the last crew members to abandon Monitor minutes before she sank in a storm at sea, who was the last surviving crew member of Monitor and lived well into the 20th century.

== Service ==
On 6 March 1862, the ship departed New York bound for Fort Monroe, Virginia, towed by the ocean-going tug Seth Low and accompanied by the gunboats Currituck and Sachem. Worden, not trusting the seal between the turret and the hull, and ignoring Ericsson's advice, wedged the former in the up position and stuffed oakum and sail cloth in the gap. Rising seas that night washed the oakum away and water poured underneath the turret, as well as through the hawsepipe, various hatches, ventilation pipes, and the two funnels, so that the belts for the ventilation and boiler fans loosened and fell off and the fires in the boilers were nearly extinguished over the course of the next day; this created a toxic atmosphere in the engine room that knocked out most of the engine-room crew. First Assistant Engineer Isaac Newton ordered the engine room abandoned and had the able-bodied crew drag the afflicted engine room hands to the top of the turret where the fresh air could revive them. Both Newton and Stimers worked desperately to get the blowers to work, but they too succumbed to the noxious fumes and were taken above. One fireman was able to punch a hole in the fan box, drain the water, and restart the fan. Later that night, the wheel ropes controlling the ship's rudder jammed, making it nearly impossible to control the ship's heading in the rough seas. Monitor was now in danger of foundering, so Worden signaled Seth Low for help and had Monitor towed to calmer waters closer to shore so she was able to restart her engines later that evening. She rounded Cape Charles around 3:00 pm on 8 March and entered Chesapeake Bay, reaching Hampton Roads at 9:00 pm, well after the first day's fighting in the Battle of Hampton Roads had concluded.

=== Battle of Hampton Roads ===
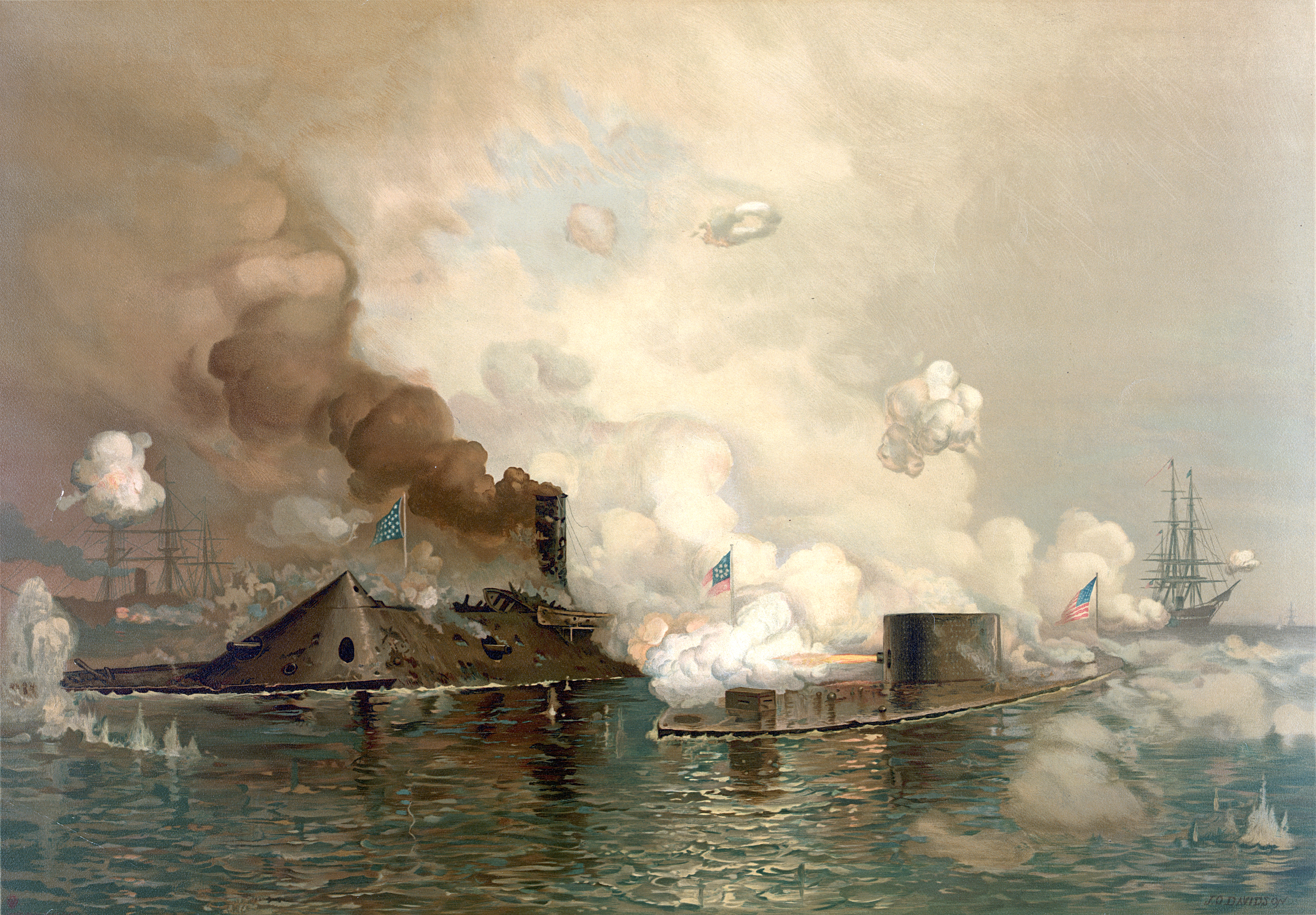
USS Monitor engaging CSS Virginia, 9 March 1862

On 8 March 1862, Virginia, commanded by Commander Franklin Buchanan, was ready to engage the Union flotilla blockading the James River. (Note: Buchanan was commander of the Washington Navy Yard when the war broke out.) Virginia was powered by Merrimack's original engines, which had been condemned by the US Navy before her capture. The ship's chief engineer, H. Ashton Ramsay, served in Merrimack before the Civil War broke out and knew of the engines' unreliability, but Buchanan pushed forward undaunted. (Note: Before setting out to engage the Union blockade Buchanan had quizzed Ramsay and learned of the history of their questionable reliability.)

The slow-moving Virginia attacked the Union blockading squadron in Hampton Roads, Virginia, destroying the sail frigates Cumberland and Congress. (Note: Serving aboard Congress was Buchanan's brother, McKean Buchanan.) Early in the battle, the steam frigate USS Minnesota ran aground while attempting to engage Virginia, and remained stranded throughout the battle. Virginia, however, was unable to attack Minnesota before daylight faded. That day Buchanan was severely wounded in the leg and was relieved of command by Catesby ap Roger Jones.

Days before the battle a telegraph cable was laid between Fortress Monroe, which overlooked Hampton Roads, and Washington. Washington was immediately informed of the dire situation after the initial battle. Many were now concerned Virginia would put to sea and begin bombarding cities such as New York while others feared she would ascend the Potomac River and attack Washington. In an emergency meeting among President Lincoln, Secretary of War Edwin M. Stanton, Secretary Welles and other senior naval officers, inquiries were made about Monitor's ability to stop Virginia's prospect of further destruction. When the temperamental Stanton learned that Monitor had only two guns, he expressed contempt and rage as he paced back and forth, further increasing the anxiety and despair among attendees of the meeting. Assurances from Admiral Dahlgren and other officers that Virginia was too massive to effectively approach Washington and that Monitor was capable of meeting the challenge gave him no consolation. After further deliberation, Lincoln was finally assured, but Stanton remained almost in a state of terror and sent telegrams to various governors and mayors of the coastal states warning them of the danger. Subsequently, Stanton approved a plan to load some sixty canal boats with stone and gravel and sink them in the Potomac, but Welles was able to convince Lincoln at the last moment that such a plan would only prevent Monitor and other Union ships from reaching Washington and that the barges should only be sunk if Virginia was able to make her way up the Potomac.

About 9:00 pm, Monitor finally arrived on the scene, only to discover the destruction that Virginia had already wrought on the Union fleet. Worden was ordered upon reaching Hampton Roads to anchor alongside USS Roanoke and report to Captain John Marston; Worden was briefed on the situation and received further orders to protect the grounded Minnesota. By midnight, under the cover of darkness, Monitor quietly pulled up alongside and behind the Minnesota and waited.

==== Duel of the ironclads ====
The next morning at about 6:00 am Virginia, accompanied by Jamestown, Patrick Henry and Teaser, got underway from Sewell's Point to finish off Minnesota and the rest of the blockaders, but were delayed from reaching Hampton Roads because of heavy fog until about 8:00 am. In Monitor Worden was already at his station in the pilot house while Greene took command of the turret. Samuel Howard, Acting Master of Minnesota, who was familiar with Hampton Roads with its varying depths and shallow areas, had volunteered to be the pilot the night before and thus was accepted, while Quarter Master Peter Williams steered the vessel throughout the battle (Williams was later awarded the Medal of Honor for this act). The speaking tube used to communicate between the pilothouse and the turret broke early in the action, so Keeler and Toffey had to relay commands from Worden to Greene. As Virginia approached, she began firing at Minnesota from more than a mile away, a few of her shells hitting the vessel. When the firing was heard in the distance, Greene sent Keeler to the pilot house for permission to open fire as soon as possible; Worden ordered, "Tell Mr. Greene not to fire till I give the word, to be cool and deliberate, to take sure aim and not waste a shot."

Monitor, to the surprise of Virginia's crew, emerged from behind Minnesota and positioned herself between her and the grounded ship, preventing the Confederate ironclad from further engaging the vulnerable wooden ship at close range. At 8:45 am Worden gave the order to fire; Greene fired the first shots of the battle between the two ironclads, which harmlessly deflected off the Confederate ironclad. During the battle Monitor fired solid shot, about once every eight minutes, while Virginia fired shell exclusively. The ironclads fought, generally at close range, for about four hours, ending at 12:15 pm, (Note: Accounts vary, some claim the battle lasted no more than three and a half hours, while some claim as many as five hours.) ranging from a few yards to more than a hundred. Both ships were constantly in motion, maintaining a circular pattern. Because of Virginia's weak engines, great size and weight, and a draft of 22 ft (6.7 m), she was slow and difficult to maneuver, taking her half an hour to complete a 180-degree turn.

During the engagement, the controls of the machinery driving Monitor's turret spindle began to malfunction, making it extremely difficult to turn and stop the turret itself at a given position, so the crew simply let the turret continuously turn and fired their guns "on the fly" as they bore on Virginia. Monitor received several direct hits on the turret, causing some bolts to violently shear off and ricochet around inside. The deafening sound of the impact stunned some of the crew, causing bleeding from noses and ears. However, neither vessel was able to sink or seriously damage the other. At one point, Virginia attempted to ram, but only struck Monitor a glancing blow and did no damage. The collision did, however, aggravate the damage to Virginia's bow from when she had previously rammed Cumberland. Monitor was also unable to do significant damage to Virginia, possibly because her guns were firing with reduced charges, on advice from Commander John Dahlgren, the gun's designer, who lacked the "preliminary information" needed to determine what amount of charge was needed to "pierce, dislocate or dislodge iron plates" of various thicknesses and configurations. (Note: In a letter of 19 March 1862, to Captain A. A. Harwood, Chief of Bureau of Ordnance and hydrography, Dahlgren emphasized "A subject so important cannot be perfected without much reflection and extensive experiment. But we lack almost the preliminary information indispensable to commence with.") During the battle Stodder was stationed at the wheel that controlled the turning of the turret, but at one point when he was leaning against its side the turret received a direct hit directly opposite to him which knocked him clear across the inside, rendering him unconscious. He was taken below to recover and relieved by Stimers.

The two vessels were at such close range that they collided five times. By 11:00 am Monitor's supply of shot in the turret had been exhausted. With one of the gun port covers jammed shut, she hauled off to shallow waters to resupply the turret and repair the damaged hatch, which could not be fixed. During the lull in the battle, Worden climbed through the gun port out onto the deck to get a better view of the overall situation. Virginia, seeing Monitor turn away, turned her attention to Minnesota and fired shots that set the wooden vessel ablaze, also destroying the nearby tugboat Dragon. When the turret was resupplied with ammunition, Worden returned to battle with only one gun able to fire.

Towards the end of the engagement, Worden directed Williams to steer Monitor around the stern of the Confederate ironclad; Lieutenant Wood fired Virginia's 7-inch Brooke gun at Monitor's pilothouse, striking the forward side directly beneath the sight hold, cracking the structural "iron log" along the base of the narrow opening just as Worden was peering out. Worden was heard to cry out, My eyes—I am blind! Others in the pilothouse had also been hit with fragments and were also bleeding. Temporarily blinded by shell fragments and gunpowder residue from the explosion, and believing the pilothouse to be severely damaged, Worden ordered Williams to sheer off into shallow water, where Virginia with her deep draft could not follow. There Monitor drifted idly for about twenty minutes. At the time the pilothouse was struck, Worden's injury was only known to those in the pilothouse and immediately nearby. With Worden severely wounded, command passed to the executive officer, Samuel Greene. Taken by surprise, he was briefly undecided as to what action to take next, but after assessing the damage, soon ordered Monitor to return to the battle.

Shortly after Monitor withdrew, Virginia ran aground, at which time Jones came down from the spar deck to find the gun crews not returning fire. Jones demanded to know why and was briefed by Lieutenant Eggleston that powder was low and precious, and given Monitor's resistance to shot after two hours of battle, maintained that continued firing at that point would be a waste of ammunition. Virginia soon managed to break away and headed back towards Norfolk for needed repairs, believing that Monitor had withdrawn from battle. Greene did not pursue; like Worden, he was under orders to stay with and protect Minnesota, an action for which he was later criticized.

As a result of the duel between the two ironclads, Monitor was struck 22 times, including nine hits to the turret and two to the pilothouse. She had managed to fire 41 shots from her pair of Dahlgren guns. Virginia sustained 97 indentations to her armor from the fire of Monitor and other ships. Neither ship sustained any significant damage. In the opinion of Virginia's commander Jones and her other officers, Monitor could have sunk their ship had she hit the vessel at the waterline.

Strategically, the battle between these two ships was considered the most definitive naval battle of the Civil War. The battle itself was largely considered a draw, though it could be argued Virginia did slightly more damage. Monitor did successfully defend Minnesota and the rest of the Union blockading force, while Virginia was unable to complete the destruction she started the previous day. The battle marked a turning point in the way naval warfare would be fought in the future. Strategically, nothing had changed: the Union still controlled Hampton Roads and the Confederates still held several rivers and Norfolk, making it a strategic victory for the North. The battle of the ironclads led to what was referred to as "Monitor fever" in the North. During the course of the war, improved designs based on Monitor emerged; 60 ironclads were built.

==== Events after the battle ====
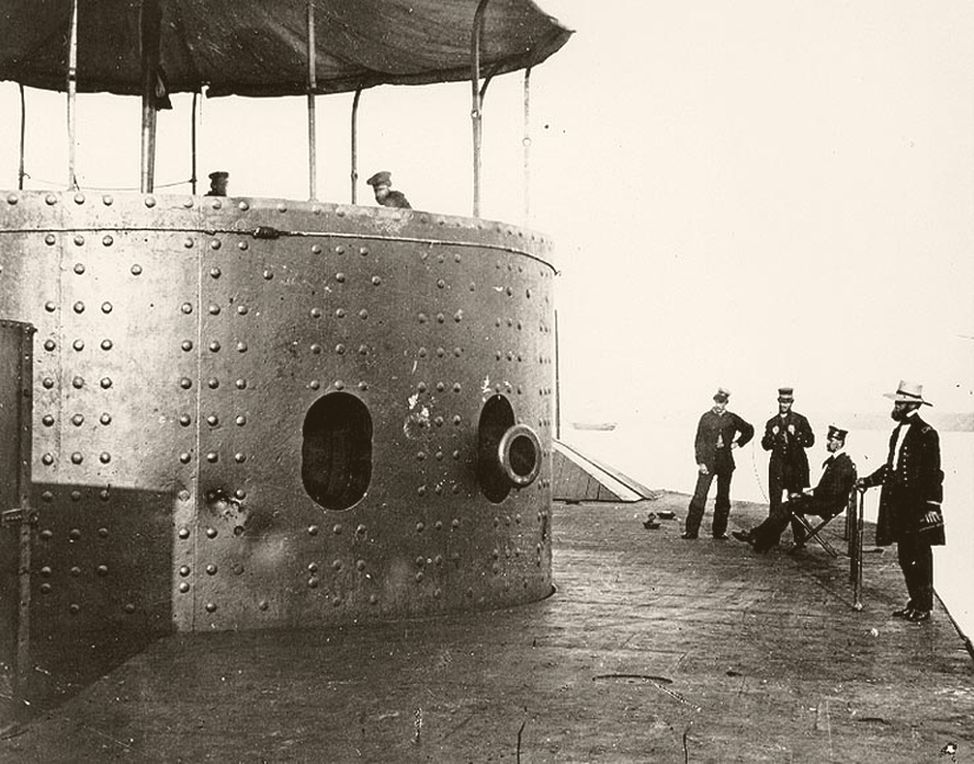
Officers at right are (left to right): Third Assistant Engineer Robinson W. Hands, Acting Master Louis N. Stodder, Second Assistant Engineer Albert B. Campbell and Acting Volunteer Lieutenant William Flye (with binoculars). Monitor on the James River, Virginia, 9 July 1862.

Immediately following the battle Stimers telegraphed Ericsson, congratulating and thanking him for making it possible to confront the Confederate ironclad and for "saving the day". No sooner than Monitor had weighed anchor, numerous small boats and spectators on shore flocked around the ship to congratulate the crew for what they regarded as their victory over Virginia. Assistant Secretary Fox, who observed the entire battle from aboard Minnesota, came aboard Monitor and jokingly told her officers, "Well gentlemen, you don't look as though you just went through one of the greatest naval conflicts on record". A small tug soon came alongside and the blinded Worden was brought up from his cabin while crew members and spectators cheered. He was taken to Fort Monroe for preliminary treatment, then to a hospital in Washington.

Stimers and Newton soon began repairing the damage to the pilot house, and reconfigured the sides from an upright position to a slope of thirty degrees to deflect shot. During this time, Mrs. Worden personally brought news of her husband's progress and recovery and was optimistic, informing the crew his eyesight would soon return but he would be laid up for some time. She also informed them President Lincoln had personally paid Worden a visit extending his gratitude. Worden was later taken to his summer home in New York and remained unconscious for three months. He returned to Naval service in 1862 as captain of USS Montauk, another Monitor-type ironclad.

The Confederates were also celebrating what they considered a victory, as crowds of spectators gathered along the banks of the Elizabeth River, cheering and waving flags, handkerchiefs and hats as Virginia, displaying the captured ensign of Congress, passed along up the river. The Confederate government was ecstatic and immediately promoted Buchanan to Admiral.

Both the Union and Confederacy soon came up with plans for defeating the other's ironclad. Oddly, these did not depend on their own ironclads. The Union Navy chartered a large ship (the sidewheeler USS Vanderbilt) and reinforced her bow with steel specifically to be used as a naval ram, provided Virginia steamed far enough out into Hampton Roads.

On 11 April, Virginia, accompanied by a number of gunboats, steamed into Hampton Roads to Sewell's Point at the southeast edge, almost over to Newport News, in a challenge to lure Monitor into battle. Virginia fired a few shots ineffectively at very long range while Monitor returned fire, remaining near Fort Monroe, ready to fight if Virginia came to attack the Federal force congregated there. Furthermore, Vanderbilt was in position to ram Virginia if she approached the fort, but Virginia did not take the bait. In a further attempt to entice Monitor closer to the Confederate side so she could be boarded, the James River Squadron moved in and captured three merchant ships, the brigs Marcus and Sabout, and the schooner Catherine T. Dix. These had been grounded and abandoned when they sighted Virginia entering the Roads. Their flags were then hoisted "Union-side down" to taunt Monitor into a fight as they were towed back to Norfolk. In the end, both sides had failed to provoke a fight on their terms.

The Confederate Navy originally had devised a plan by which the James River Squadron would swarm Monitor with a party of men to board and capture the vessel, and disable her by using heavy hammers to drive iron wedges under and disable the turret, and by covering the pilothouse with a wet sail effectively blinding the pilot. Others would throw combustibles down the ventilation openings and smoke holes. At one point Jones made such an attempt to board the vessel, but she managed to slip away around the stern of Virginia in time.

There was a second confrontation on 8 May, when Virginia came out while Monitor and four other Federal ships bombarded Confederate batteries at Sewell's Point. The Federal ships retired slowly to Fort Monroe, hoping to lure Virginia into the Roads. She did not follow, however, and after firing a gun to windward as a sign of contempt, anchored off Sewell's Point. Later, when Confederate forces abandoned Norfolk on 11 May 1862, they were forced to destroy Virginia.

=== Battle of Drewry's Bluff ===
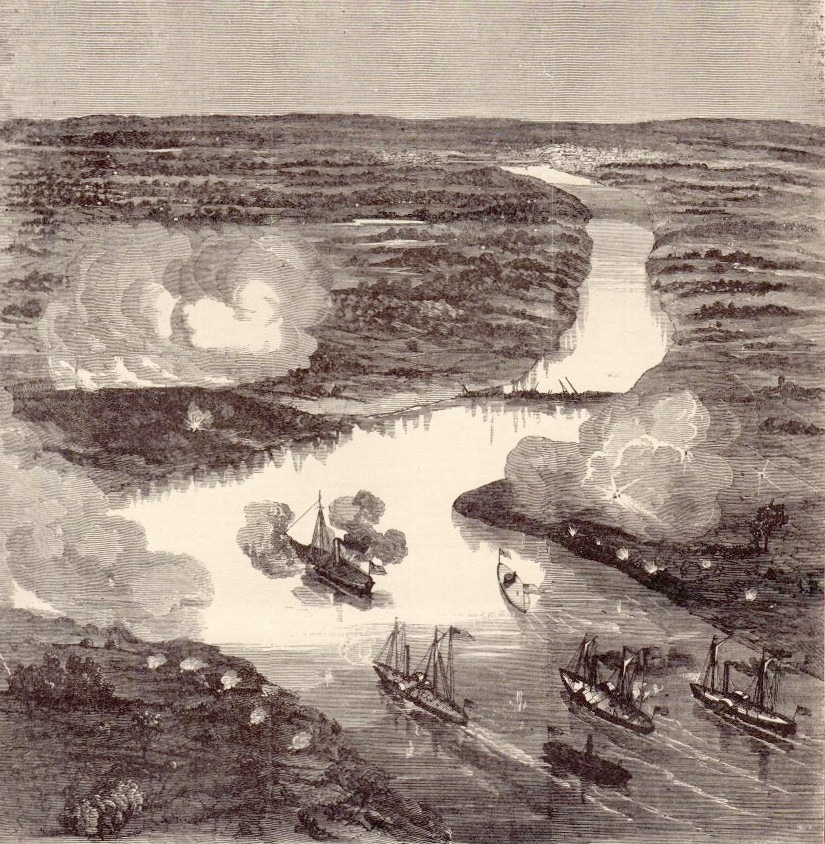
An engraving of Battle of Drewry's Bluff

After the destruction of Virginia, Monitor was free to assist the Union Army and General McClellan's campaign against Richmond. As the Navy always gave command to officers based on seniority, Greene was replaced with Lieutenant Thomas O. Selfridge the day after the battle. Two days later, Selfridge was in turn relieved by Lieutenant William Nicholson Jeffers on 15 May 1862. Monitor was now part of a flotilla under the command of Admiral John Rodgers aboard Galena, and, along with three other gunboats, steamed up the James River and engaged the Confederate batteries at Drewry's Bluff. The force had instructions to coordinate their efforts with McClellan's forces on land and push on towards Richmond to bombard the city into surrender if possible. Without any assistance, the task force got within 8 mi (13 km) of the Confederate capital but could not proceed further because of sunken vessels and debris placed in the river that blocked further passage. There were also artillery batteries at Fort Darling overlooking and guarding the approach, along with other heavy guns and sharpshooters positioned along the river banks. The fort was strategically situated on the west bank of the James River atop of a bluff some 200 ft (61 m) above and overlooking the bend in the river. Monitor was of little help in the assault because the confinement and small gun ports of her turret would not allow her to elevate her guns sufficiently to engage the Confederate batteries at close range, so she had to fall back and fire at a greater distance, while the other gunboats were unable to overcome the fortifications on their own. After Monitor received only a few hits, without incurring any damage, the Confederates, many of whom were former crew members of Virginia well aware of her ability to withstand cannon shot even at close range, concentrated their guns on the other ships, especially Galena, which sustained considerable damage and moderate casualties. After a near four-hour artillery duel and sustaining numerous hits overall, the flotilla was unable to neutralize the fortification and had to turn back. Not a single Union ship reached Richmond until near the end of the war, when the city was finally evacuated by the Confederates.

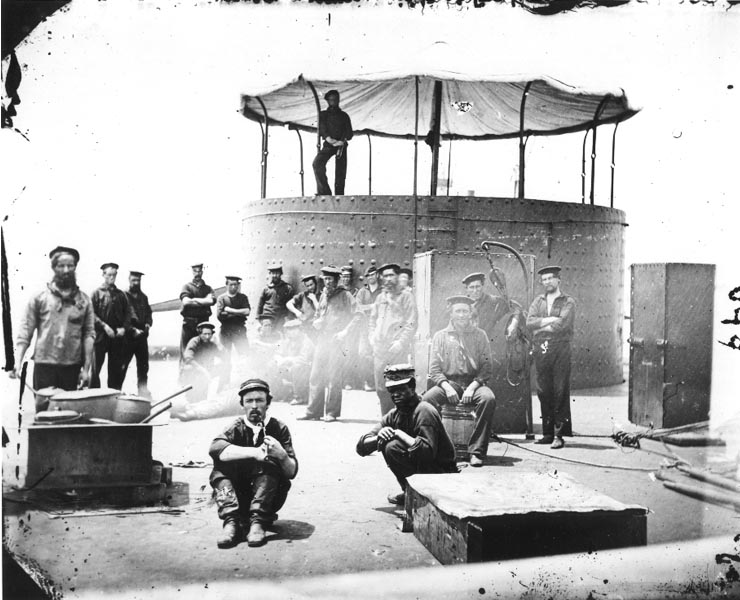
An 1862 picture of USS Monitor crew. The African American crewman in the right foreground is Siah Carter.

After the battle at Drewry's Bluff Monitor remained on the James River providing support, along with the Galena and other gunboats, to McClellan's troops at various points along the river including Harrison's Landing which ended in August. However most of the time spent on the river was marked with inactivity and hot weather which had a negative effect on the morale of Monitor's crew. During the long, hot, summer, several crew members became sick and were transferred to Hampton Roads while various officers were replaced including Newton, while Jeffers was replaced by Commander Thomas H. Stevens, Jr. (Note: Stevens previously served as commander of USS Maratanza.) on 15 August. By the end of August, Monitor was ordered back to Hampton Roads and dropped anchor nearby the sunken Cumberland at Newport News Point on 30 August, much to the approval of the crew. Monitor's sole purpose now was to blockade the James River from any advances made by the newly constructed Virginia II, an ironclad ram.

=== Repairs and refit ===
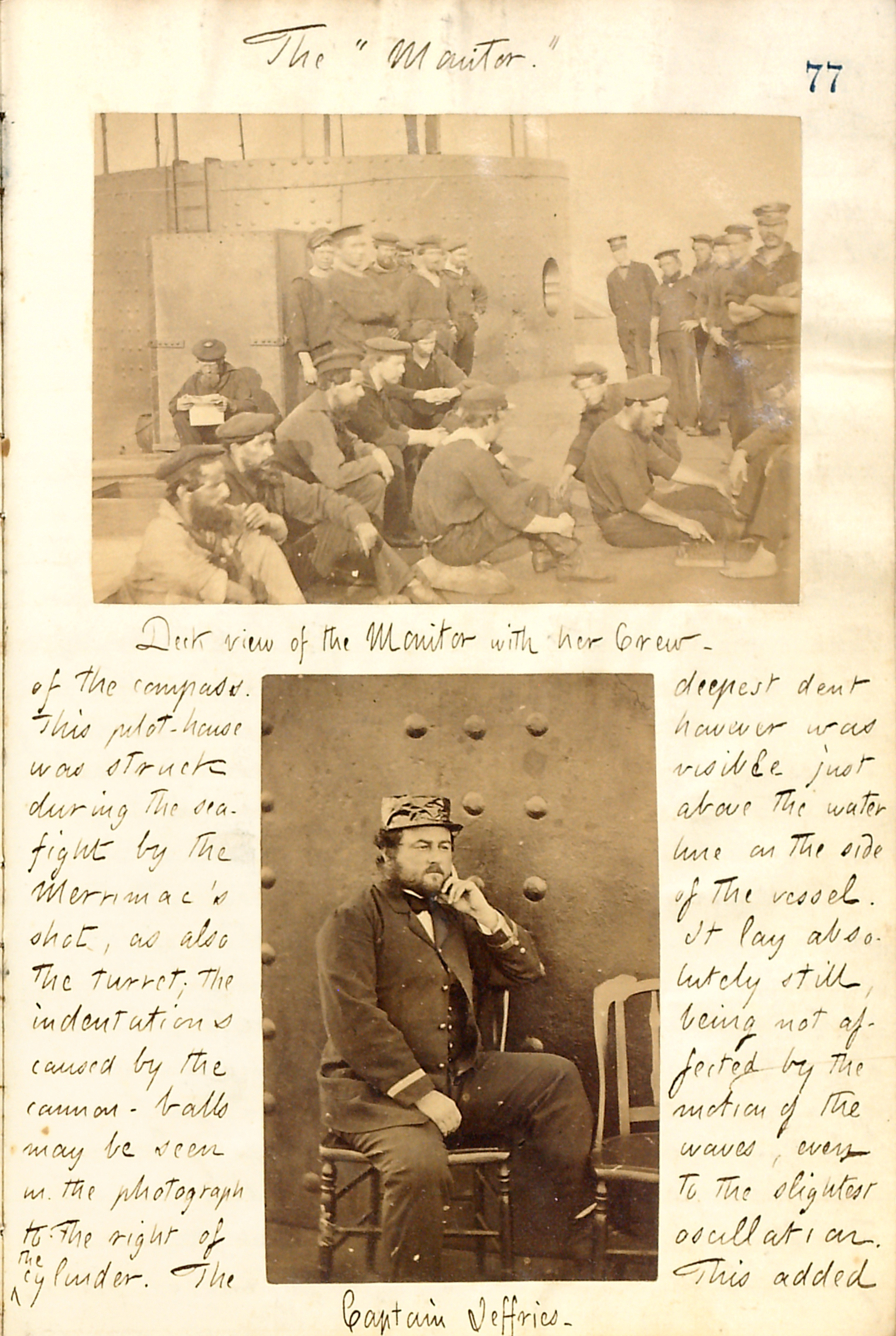
[Top photo] picture of the Monitor's crew; [Bottom Picture] Lieutenant Jeffers, second commander of the Monitor four months after the fight at Hampton Roads in 1862

In September Captain John P. Bankhead received orders to take command of Monitor, relieving Stevens, and was sent to Hampton Roads to take charge of the vessel. Shortly after Bankhead assumed command, Monitor's engines and boilers were condemned by a board of survey which recommended that they be overhauled completely. On 30 September the ironclad was sent to the Washington Navy Yard for repairs arriving there on 3 October.

Upon arrival at Washington Monitor and her crew were greeted by a crowd of thousands of cheering admirers who came to see the ship that "saved the nation". Monitor was now a premier tourist attraction and the crowd was soon allowed on board to tour the vessel. During this time the vessel was picked clean of artifacts for souvenirs by the touring civilians that came aboard. When Stodder and others came to close up the dock and ship one evening Stodder noted, "When we came up to clean that night there was not a key, doorknob, escutcheon – there wasn't a thing that hadn't been carried away."

Before Monitor was put into dry dock for repairs, Lincoln, Fox, various officials and a few of Worden's close friends arrived to ceremoniously review the vessel and pay respect to the crew and former commander Worden, who after a long and partial recovery arrived for the occasion. Entire army regiments were also directed to come by the navy yard and review the ship and honor the crew. Monitor's crew assembled on deck in formation with their officers in front, while Lincoln, Fox and other guests stood near the turret. When Worden, with part of his face blackened from the wounds he received at Hampton Roads, came aboard, the heavy guns in the navy yard were fired in salute. Lincoln came forward and greeted Worden and then introduced him to some of the others. After his formal greeting the crew swarmed around Worden and embraced and shook hands with their former commander and thanked God for his recovery and return. Worden called each of them by name and spoke friendly to and complimented each of them personally. When order was restored the President gave a short speech about Worden's career. At Fox's request, Worden gave a speech to the gathering about his voyage from New York to Hampton Roads, the trials they were faced with along the way and of the great battle between Monitor and Virginia, while paying tribute to many of the officers and men involved. In closing he gave special thanks to Ericsson, Lincoln, Welles and all who made construction of Monitor possible.

While Monitor was undergoing repairs her crew was put aboard USS King Philip and were eventually granted a furlough by Bankhead who himself went on leave. For approximately six weeks the vessel remained in dry dock while her bottom was scraped clean, the engines and boilers were overhauled, the entire vessel was cleaned and painted, and a number of improvements made, including an iron shield around the top of the turret. To make the vessel more seaworthy, a 30-foot (9 m) funnel-shaped smokestack was placed over the smoke outlet while taller fresh air vents were installed. The berth deck below was also enlarged and raised by removing some of the side storerooms and placing them below, thus reducing the height of the interior which now barely allowed the crew to stand upright. Several cranes were also added while interior improvements were made making the confining environment more livable. A large blower that operated with its own engine was installed which drew fresh air down through the pilothouse. During this time the two Dahlgren guns were each engraved with large letters, MONITOR & MERRIMAC – WORDEN and MONITOR & MERRIMAC – ERICSSON, respectively. (Note: In the actual engravings the men's names are inscribed below those of the ships' names. e.g. MONITOR & MERRIMAC WORDEN) Additional iron plates were installed covering the dents from the previous battles. Each plate was inscribed with the name of the source from where the shell causing the dent was made. i.e. Merrimack, Fort Darling, etc. Stanchions were also installed around the perimeter of the freeboard with a rope strung through each making it safer to walk about the deck amid stormy weather and rough seas. Monitor was finally taken out of dry dock on 26 October. By November the ship was fully repaired and ready to return to service.

=== Final voyage ===
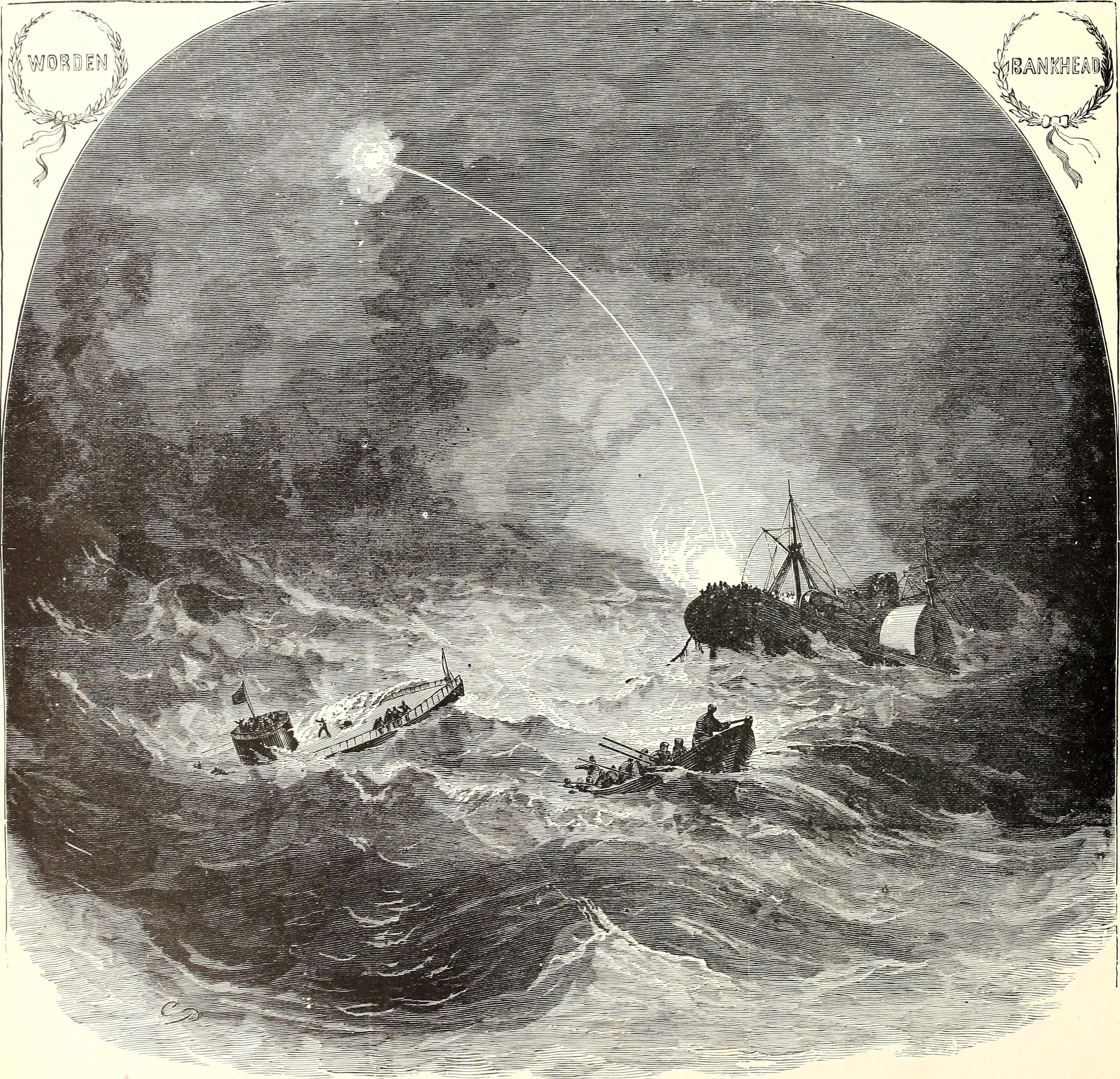
An engraving of USS Monitor sinking, with USS Rhode Island in the background

On 24 December 1862, orders were issued directing Monitor to Beaufort, North Carolina to join USS Passaic and USS Montauk for a joint Army-Navy expedition against Wilmington, North Carolina, where she would join the blockade off Charleston. The orders were received by the crew on Christmas Day, some of whom had been aboard Monitor on her harrowing journey from New York to Hampton Roads in March and were not pleased with the prospect of taking to the high seas once again. Dana Greene remarked, "I do not consider this steamer a sea going vessel".

The crew celebrated Christmas aboard Monitor while berthed at Hampton Roads in what was described as a most merry fashion, while many other celebrations were occurring along the shore. The ship's cook was paid one dollar to prepare a meal for the crew befitting the day; it was received with mixed opinion. That day, Monitor was made ready for sea, her crew under strict orders not to discuss the impending voyage with anyone, but bad weather delayed her departure until 29 December.

While the design of Monitor was well-suited for river combat, her low freeboard and heavy turret made her highly unseaworthy in rough waters. Under the command of John P. Bankhead, Monitor put to sea on 31 December, under tow from the steamship USS Rhode Island, as a heavy storm developed off Cape Hatteras, North Carolina. Using chalk and a blackboard, Bankhead wrote messages alerting Rhode Island that if Monitor needed help she would signal with a red lantern.

Monitor was soon in trouble as the storm increased in ferocity. Large waves were splashing over and completely covering the deck and pilot house, so the crew temporarily rigged the wheel atop the turret, which was manned by helmsman Francis Butts. Water continued flooding into the vents and ports and the ship began rolling uncontrollably in the high seas. Sometimes she would drop into a wave with such force that the entire hull would tremble. Leaks were beginning to appear everywhere. Bankhead ordered the engineers to start the Worthington pumps, which temporarily stemmed the rising waters.

Soon Monitor was hit by a squall and a series of violent waves and water continued to work its way into the vessel. Right when the Worthington pump could no longer keep pace with the flooding, a call came from the engine room that water was gaining there. Realizing the ship was in serious trouble, Bankhead signaled Rhode Island for help and hoisted the red lantern next to Monitor's white running light atop the turret. He then ordered the anchor dropped to stop the ship's rolling and pitching with little effect, making it no easier for the rescue boats to get close enough to receive her crew. He then ordered the towline cut and called for volunteers, Stodder, along with crewmates John Stocking, and James Fenwick volunteered and climbed down from the turret, but eyewitnesses said that as soon as they were on the deck Fenwick and Stocking were quickly swept overboard and drowned. Stodder managed to hang onto the safety lines around the deck and finally cut through the 13 in (33 cm) towline with a hatchet. At 11:30 pm. Bankhead ordered the engineers to stop engines and divert all available steam to the large Adams centrifugal steam pump; but with reduced steam output from a boiler being fed wet coal, it too was unable to stem the rapidly rising water. After all of the steam pumps had failed, Bankhead ordered some of the crew to man the hand pumps and organized a bucket brigade, but to no avail.

Greene and Stodder were among the last men to abandon ship and remained with Bankhead who was the last surviving man to abandon the sinking Monitor. In his official report of Monitor to the Navy Department, Bankhead praised Greene and Stodder for their heroic efforts and wrote, "I would beg leave to call the attention of the Admiral and of the Department of the particularly good conduct of Lieutenant Greene and Acting Master Louis N. Stodder, who remained with me until the last, and by their example did much toward inspiring confidence and obedience on the part of the others."

After a frantic rescue effort, Monitor finally capsized and sank, stern first, approximately 16 miles (26 km) southeast off Cape Hatteras, with the loss of sixteen men, including four officers, some of whom remained in the turret, which detached as the ship capsized. Forty-seven men were rescued by the life boats from Rhode Island. (Note: William Keeler in Annual Report of the Secretary of the Navy, (Washington: D.C.: Government Printing Office, 1863)) Bankhead, Greene and Stodder barely managed to get clear of the sinking vessel and survived the ordeal, but suffered from exposure from the icy winter sea. After his initial recovery, Bankhead filed his official report, as did the commanding officers of the Rhode Island, stating officers and men of both Monitor and Rhode Island did everything within their ability to keep Monitor from sinking. The Navy did not find it necessary to commission a board of inquiry to investigate the affair and took no action against Bankhead or any of his officers.

Some time later a controversy emerged over why Monitor sank. In the Army and Navy Journal, Ericsson accused the crew of drunkenness during the storm, being consequently unable to prevent the vessel from sinking. Stodder vigorously defended the crew and rebuked Ericsson's characterization of the crew and events and wrote to Pierce that Ericsson "covers up defects by blaming those that are now dead", pointing out that there were a number of unavoidable events and circumstances that led to the ship's sinking, foremost being the overhang between the upper and lower hulls which came loose and partially separated during the storm from slamming into the violent waves. Stodder's account was corroborated by other shipmates.

== Rediscovery ==
The Navy tested an "underwater locator" in August 1949 by searching an area south of the Cape Hatteras Lighthouse for the wreck of Monitor. It found a 140-foot (42.7 m) long object bulky enough to be a shipwreck, in 310 feet (94.5 m) of water that was thought to be Monitor, but powerful currents negated attempts by divers to investigate. Retired Rear Admiral Edward Ellsberg proposed using external pontoons to raise the wreck in 1951, the same method of marine salvage he had used on the sunken submarine S-51, for the cost of $250,000. Four years later, Robert F. Marx claimed to have discovered the wreck based on the idea she had drifted into shallow water north of the lighthouse before sinking. Marx said he had dived on the wreck and placed a Coke bottle with his name on it in one of the gun barrels, although he never provided any proof of his story.

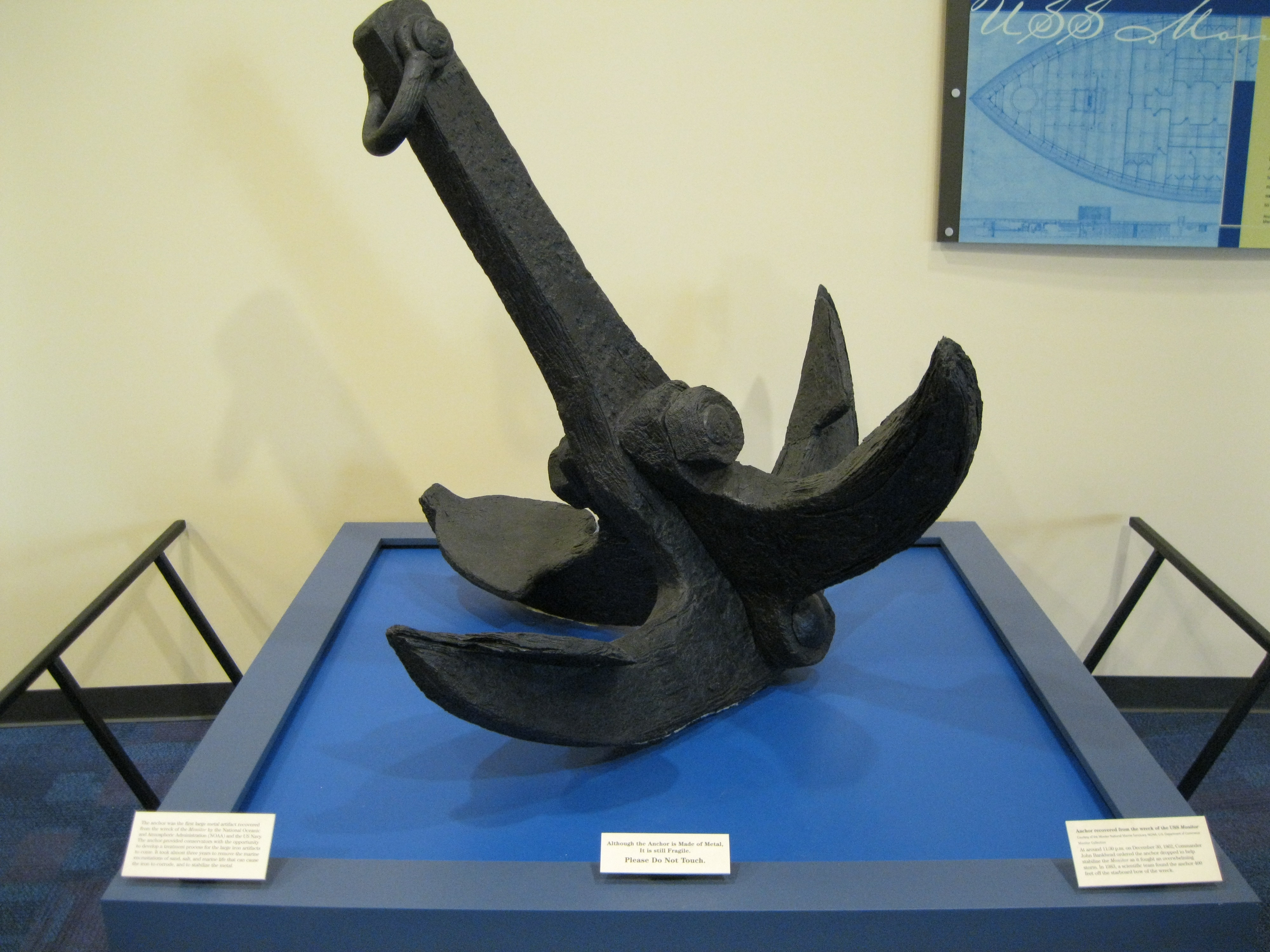
Monitor's anchor at the Mariners' Museum

Interest in locating the ship revived in the early 1970s and Duke University, the National Geographic Society and the National Science Foundation sponsored an expedition in August 1973 to search for the wreck using a towed sonar system. The Duke team was led by John G. Newton, no known relation to the Isaac Newton that served on the Monitor. On 27 August, Monitor was discovered almost 111 years after sinking, near Cape Hatteras at 230 feet (70 m) depth at coordinates 35°0′6″N 75°24′23″W.

They sent a camera down to photograph the wreck, but the pictures were so fuzzy as to be useless. On a second attempt the camera snagged something on the wreck and was lost. The sonar images did not match what they expected the wreck to look like until they realized that the sinking vessel had turned over while descending and was resting at the bottom upside down. The team announced their discovery on 8 March 1974. Another expedition was mounted that same month to confirm the discovery and the research submersible Alcoa Sea Probe was able to take still photos and video of the wreck that confirmed it was Monitor.

These photos revealed that the wreck was disintegrating and the discovery raised another issue. Since the Navy had formally abandoned the wreck in 1953, it could be exploited by divers and private salvage companies as it lay outside North Carolina's territorial limits. (Note: "Research and case law in the 1970s and 1980s determined that the U.S. Navy abandonment of the USS Monitor consisted only of striking the vessel from the Navy List, an action more accurately described as a decision to 'surplus' ships, not a legal abandonment of the warship as an item of federal property. In fact, aside from express authority from Congress, the act of abandonment is outside the authority of any agency, including the Navy. The Navy can decommission a ship, but must follow 'surplus property' procedures administered by the General Services Administration to actually dispose of the ship.") To preserve the ship, the wreck and the area around it in a .5-nautical-mile (0.93 km; 0.58 mi) radius was designated as the Monitor National Marine Sanctuary, the first U.S. marine sanctuary, on 30 January 1975. Monitor was also designated a National Historic Landmark on 23 June 1986.

In 1977, scientists were finally able to view the wreckage in person as the submersible Johnson Sea Link was used to inspect it. The Sea Link was able to ferry divers down to the sunken vessel and retrieve small artifacts. U.S. Navy interest in raising the entire ship ended in 1978 when Captain Willard F. Searle Jr. calculated the cost and possible damage expected from the operation: $20 million to stabilize the vessel in place, or as much as $50 million to bring all of it to the surface. Research continued and artifacts continued to be recovered, including the ship's 1,500-pound (680 kg) anchor in 1983. The growing number of relics required conservation and a proper home so the U.S. National Oceanic and Atmospheric Administration (NOAA), in charge of all U.S. marine sanctuaries, selected the Mariners' Museum on 9 March 1987 after considering proposals from several other institutions.

=== Recovery ===
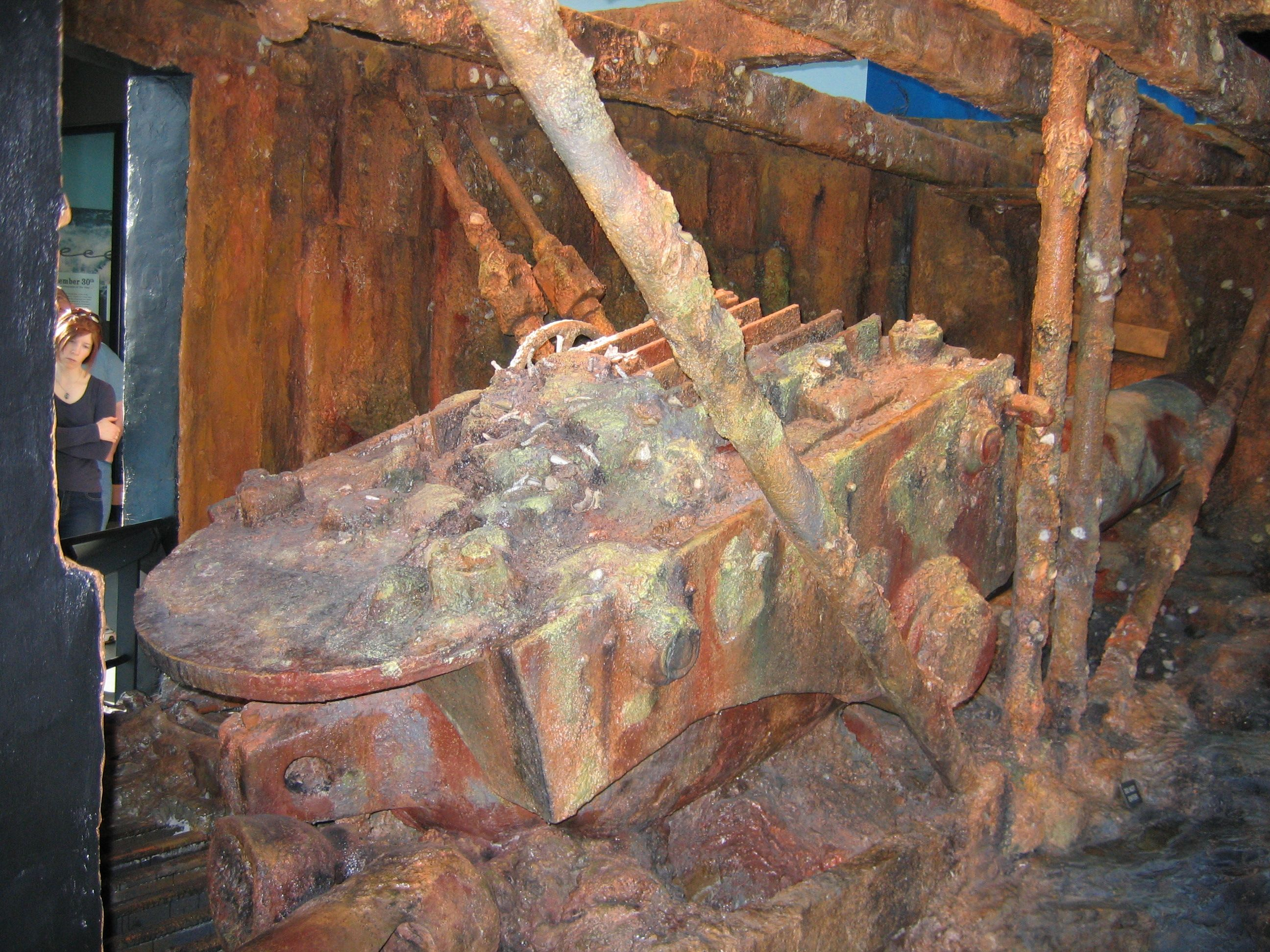
Replica of Monitor's turret in the Mariners' Museum as it was recovered

Initial efforts in 1995 by Navy and NOAA divers to raise the warship's propeller were foiled by an abnormally stormy season off Cape Hatteras. Realizing that raising the whole wreck was impractical for financial reasons as well as the inability to bring up the wreck intact, NOAA developed a comprehensive plan to recover the most significant parts of the ship, namely her engine, propeller, guns, and turret. It estimated that the plan would cost over 20 million dollars to implement over four years. The Department of Defense Legacy Resource Management Program contributed $14.5 million. The Navy divers, mainly from its two Mobile Diving and Salvage Units, would perform the bulk of the work necessary in order to train in deep sea conditions and evaluate new equipment.

Another effort to raise Monitor's propeller was successful on 8 June 1998, although the amount of effort required to work in the difficult conditions off Cape Hatteras was underestimated and the fewer than 30 divers used were nearly overwhelmed. The 1999 dive season was mostly research oriented as divers investigated the wreck in detail, planning how to recover the engine and determining if they could stabilize the hull so that it would not collapse onto the turret. In 2000, the divers shored up the port side of the hull with bags of grout, installed the engine recovery system, an external framework to which the engine would be attached, in preparation for the next season, and made over five times as many dives as they had the previous season.

The 2001 dive season concentrated on raising the ship's steam engine and condenser. Hull plates had to be removed to access the engine compartment and both the engine and the condenser had to be separated from the ship, the surrounding wreckage and each other. A Mini Rover ROV was used to provide visibility of the wreck and divers to the support staff above water. The engine was raised on 16 July and the condenser three days later by the crane barge Wotan. Saturation diving was evaluated by the Navy that dive season on Monitor and proved to be very successful, allowing divers to maximize their time on the bottom. The surface-supplied divers evaluated the use of heliox due to the depth of the wreck. It also proved to be successful once the dive tables were adjusted.

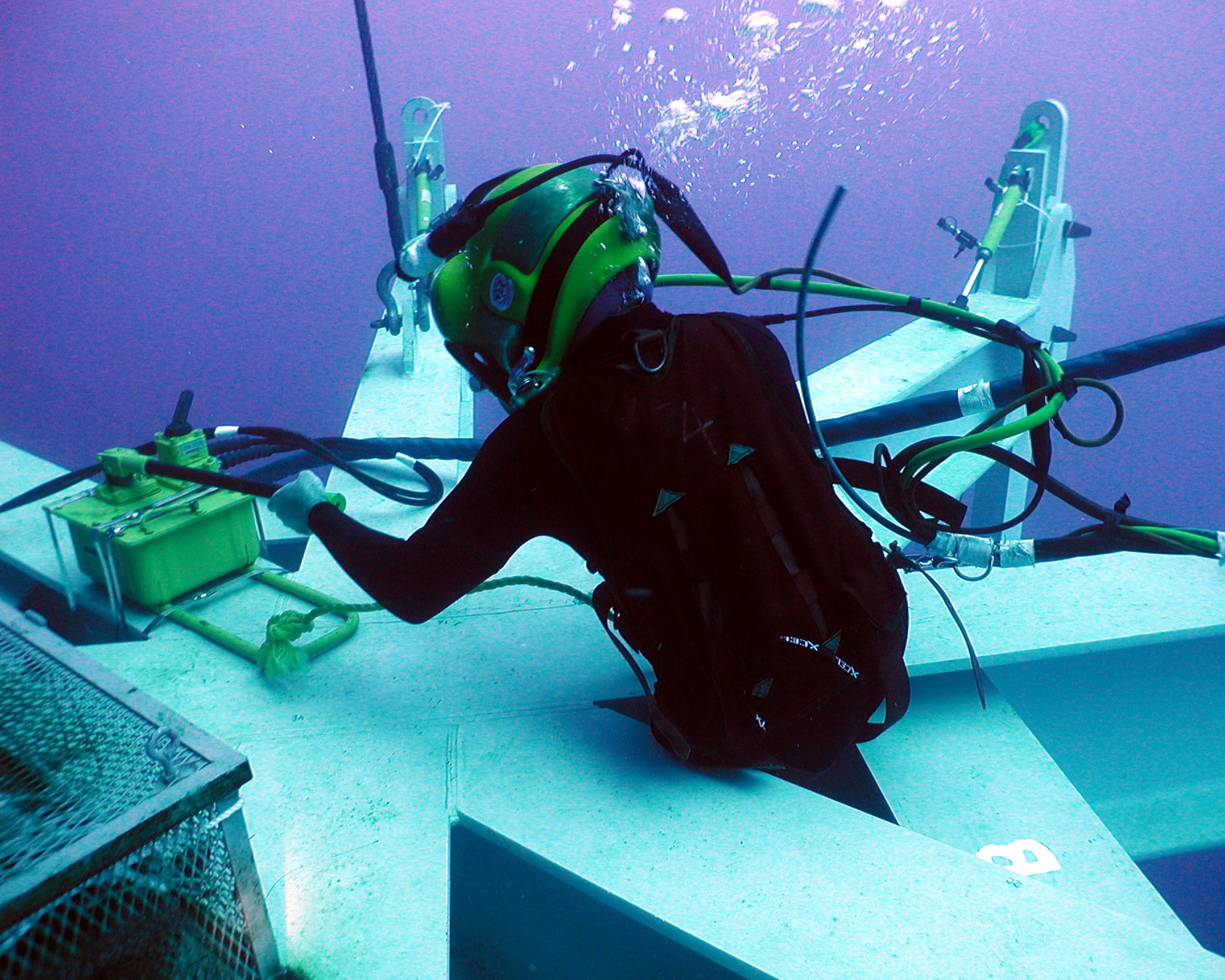
A Navy diver prepares "the spider."

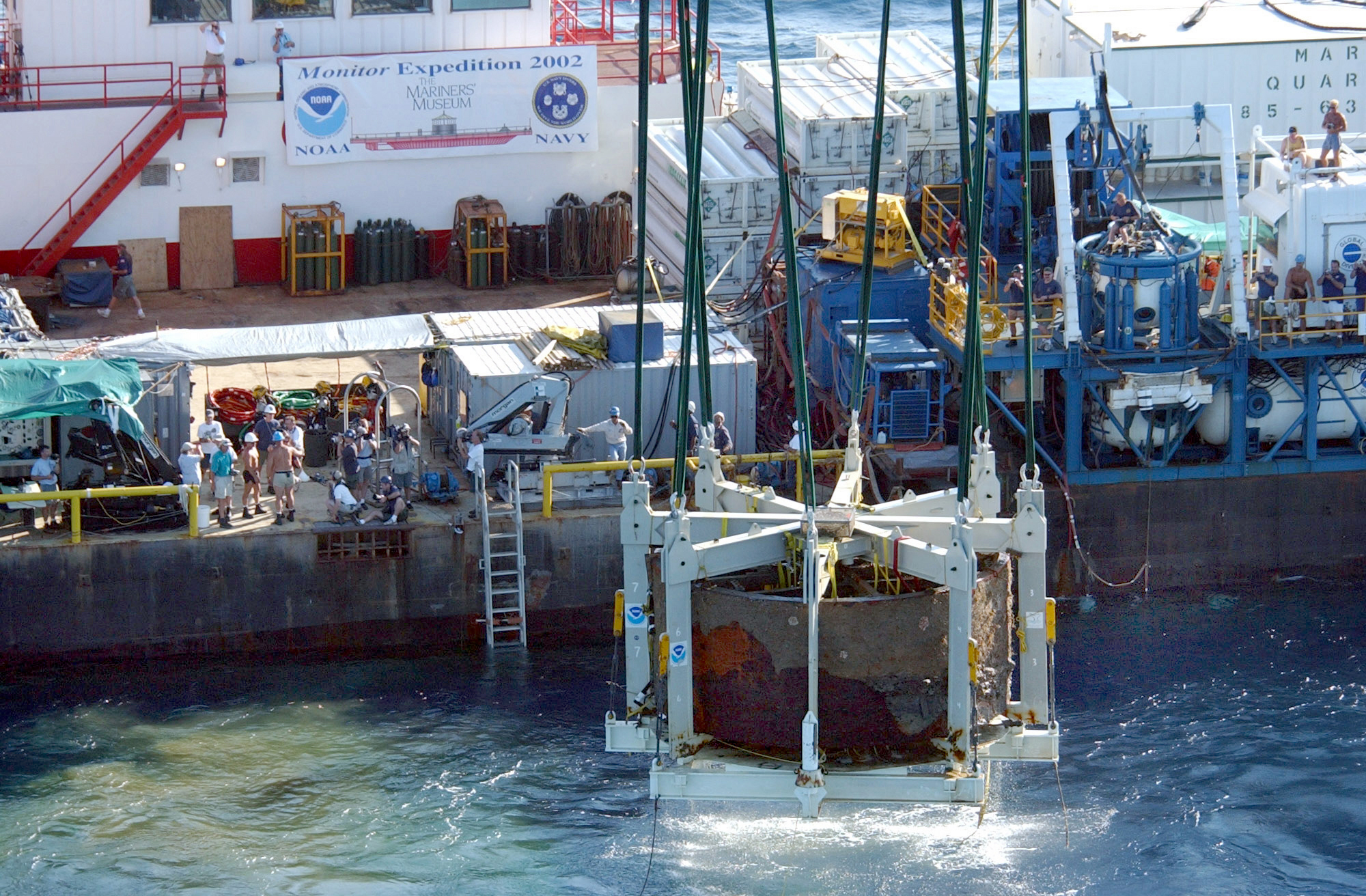
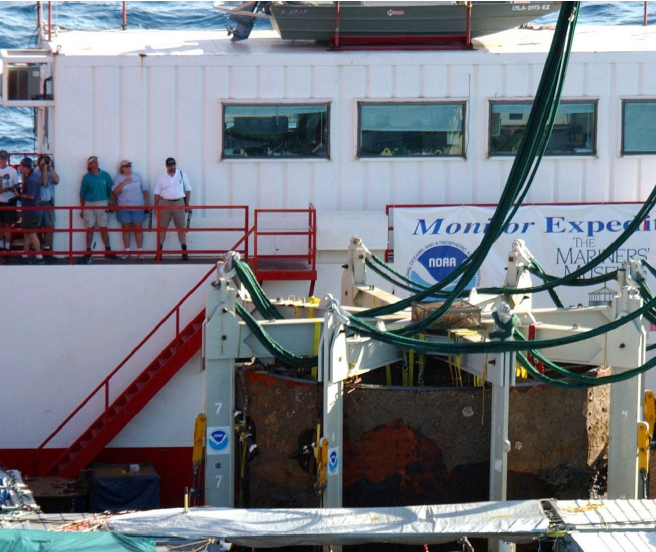
LEFT: The turret, moments after it reached the surface, secure in the "spider" lifting frame. RIGHT: The turret is loaded onto the crane barge Wotan.

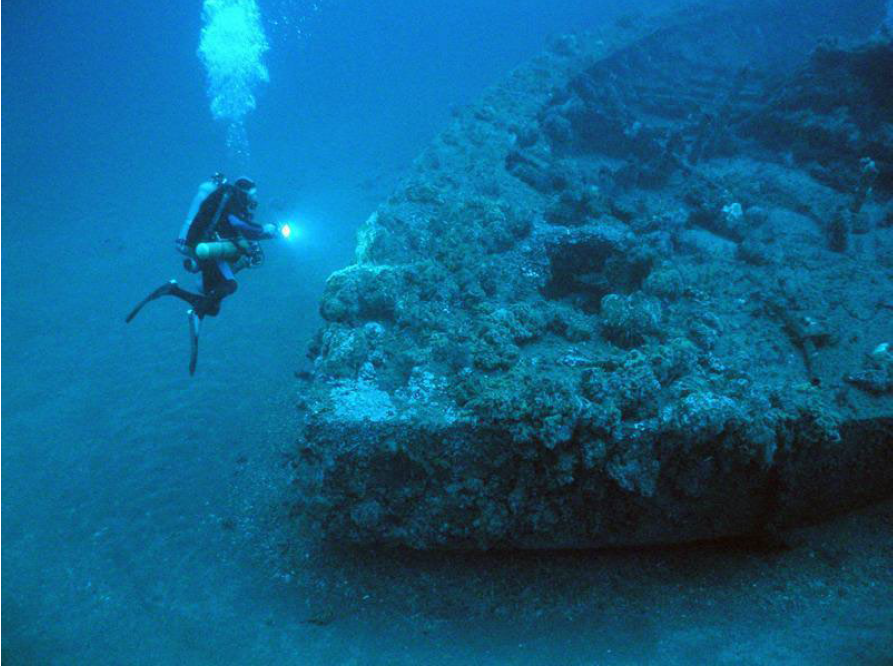
A diver examines the wreck in 2016.

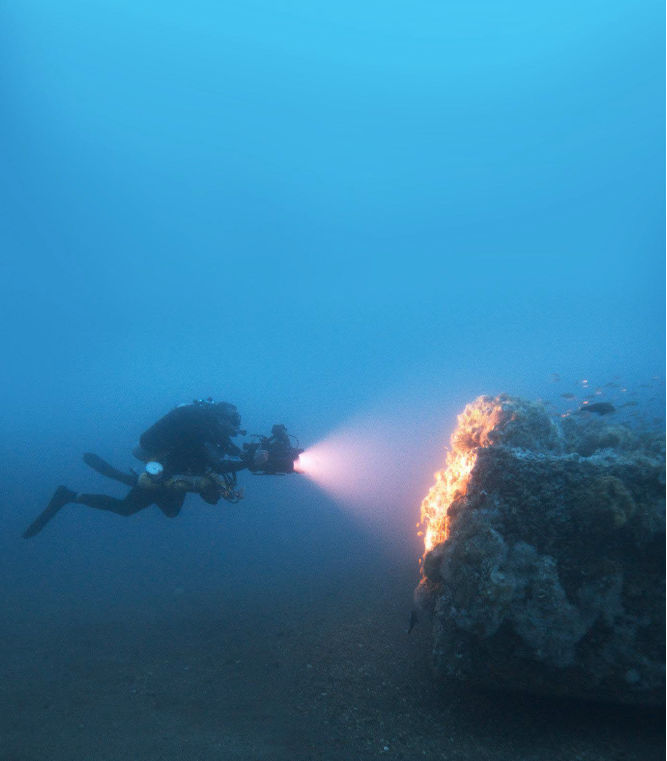
A diver shines a light at the wreck.

Much like the previous year, the 2002 dive season was dedicated to lifting the 120-long-ton (120 t) turret to the surface. Around 160 divers were assigned to remove the parts of the hull, including the armor belt, that lay on top of the turret using chisels, exothermic cutting torches and 20,000 psi (140 MPa; 1,410 kg/cm^{2}) hydroblasters. They removed as much of the debris from inside the turret as possible to reduce the weight to be lifted. This was usually concreted coal as one of the ship's coal bunkers had ruptured and dumped most of its contents into the turret.

The divers prepared the turret roof for the first stage of the lift by excavating underneath the turret and placed steel beams and angle irons to reinforce it for its move onto a lifting platform for the second stage. A large, eight-legged lifting frame, nicknamed the "spider", was carefully positioned over the turret to move it onto the platform and the entire affair would be lifted by the crane mounted on the Wotan. The divers discovered one skeleton in the turret on 26 July before the lift and spent a week carefully chipping about half of it free of the concreted debris; the other half was inaccessible underneath the rear of one of the guns.

With Tropical Storm Cristobal bearing down on the recovery team, and time and money running out, the team made the decision to raise the turret on 5 August 2002, after 41 days of work, and the gun turret broke the surface at 5:30 pm to the cheers of everyone aboard Wotan and other recovery ships nearby. As archaeologists examined the contents of the turret after it had been landed aboard Wotan, they discovered a second skeleton, but removing it did not begin until the turret arrived at the Mariners' Museum for conservation. The remains of these sailors were transferred to the Joint POW/MIA Accounting Command (JPAC) at Hickam Air Force Base, Hawaii, in the hope that they could be identified.

Only 16 of the crew were not rescued by Rhode Island before Monitor sank and the forensic anthropologists at JPAC were able to rule out the three missing black crewmen based on the shape of the femurs and skulls. Among the most promising of the 16 candidates were crew members Jacob Nicklis, Robert Williams and William Bryan, but a decade passed without their identities being discovered. On 8 March 2013 their remains were buried at Arlington National Cemetery with full military honors.

In 2003 NOAA divers and volunteers returned to the Monitor with the goal of obtaining overall video of the site to create a permanent record of the current conditions on the wreck after the turret recovery. Jeff Johnston of the Monitor National Marine Sanctuary (MNMS) also wanted a definitive image of the vessel's pilothouse. During the dives, Monitor's iron pilothouse was located near the bow of the vessel and documented for the first time by videographer Rick Allen, of Nautilus Productions, in its inverted position.

Conservation of the propeller was completed nearly three years after its recovery, and it is on display in the Monitor Center at the Mariners' Museum. As of 2013, conservation of the engine, its components, the turret and the guns continues. The Dahlgren guns were removed from the turret in September 2004 and placed in their own conservation tanks. Among some of the artifacts recovered from the sunken vessel was a red signal lantern, possibly the one used to send a distress signal to Rhode Island and the last thing to be seen before Monitor sank in 1862 – it was the first object recovered from the site in 1977. A gold wedding band was also recovered from the hand of the skeletal remains of one of Monitor's crew members found in the turret.

Northrop Grumman Shipyard in Newport News constructed a full-scale non-seaworthy static replica of Monitor. The replica was laid down in February 2005 and completed just two months later on the grounds of the Mariners' Museum. The Monitor National Marine Sanctuary conducts occasional dives on the wreck to monitor and record any changes in its condition and its environment.

== Memorials ==
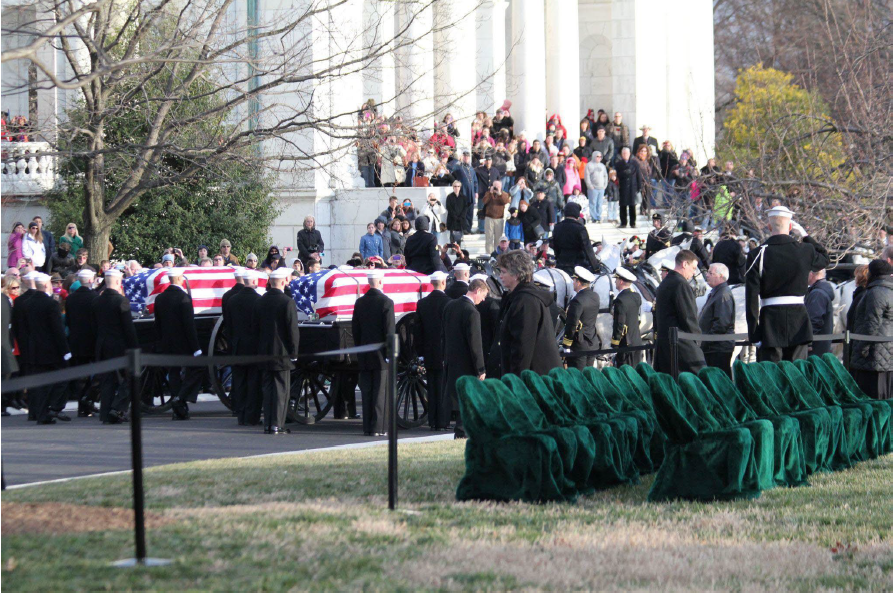
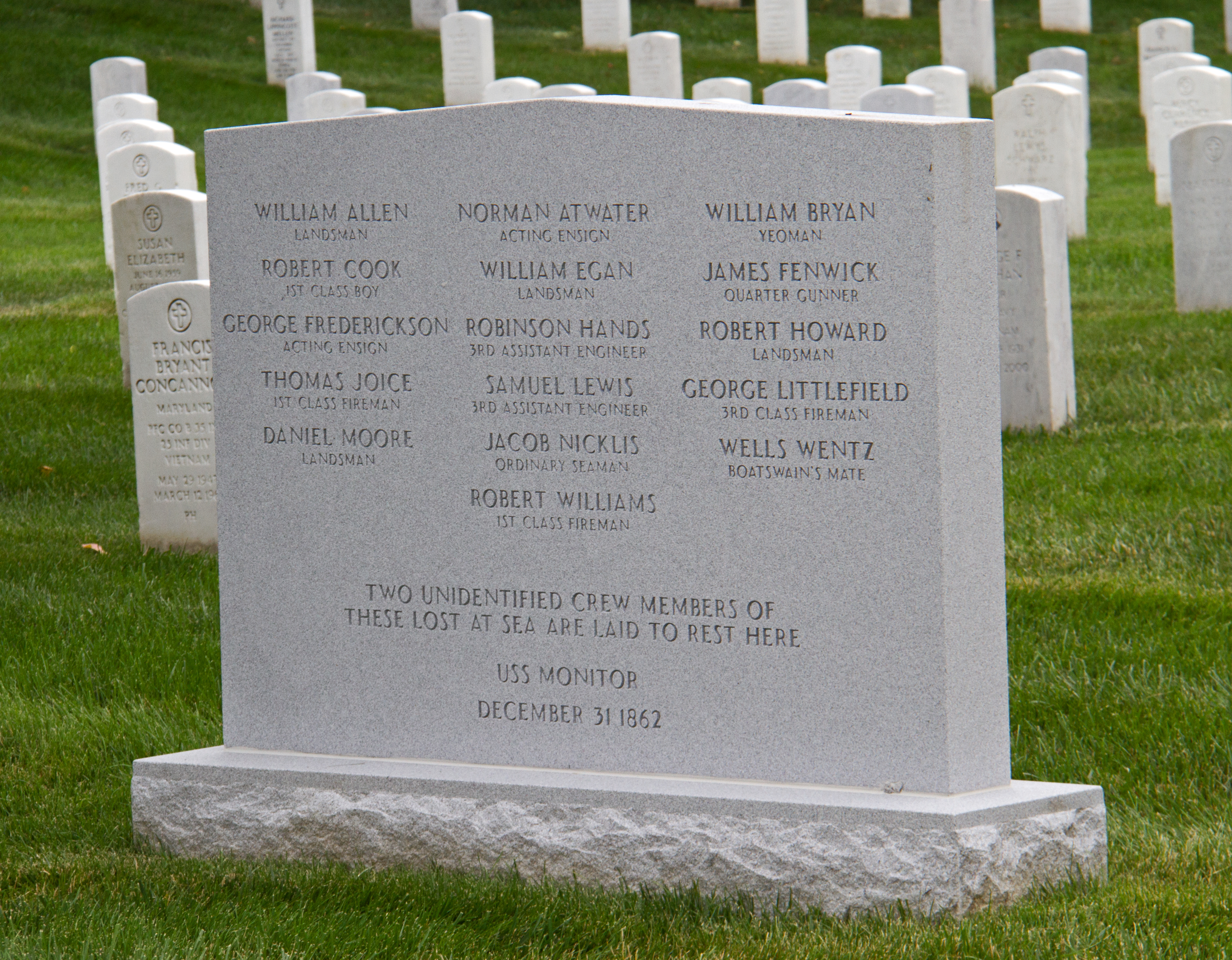
LEFT: The funeral procession for the two unidentified Monitor sailors at Arlington National Cemetery in Arlington County, Virginia, on March 8, 2013. RIGHT: The USS Monitor Memorial at Arlington National Cemetery marks the grave of the two unknowns.

The Greenpoint Monitor Monument in McGolrick Park, Brooklyn, depicts a sailor from Monitor pulling on a capstan. The sculptor Antonio de Filippo was commissioned by the State of New York in the 1930s for a bronze statue to commemorate the Battle of Hampton Roads, John Ericsson, and the crew of the ship. It was dedicated on 6 November 1938. A vandal doused it with white paint on 7 January 2013.

In 1995 the U.S. Postal Service issued a stamp commemorating USS Monitor and CSS Virginia depicting the two ships while engaged in their famous battle at Hampton Roads. For an image of the stamp, see footnote link.

The 150th anniversary of the ship's loss prompted several events in commemoration. A memorial to Monitor and her lost crew members was erected in the Civil War section of Hampton National Cemetery by NOAA's Office of National Marine Sanctuaries, together with the U.S. Navy and the U.S. Department of Veterans Affairs, and dedicated on 29 December 2012. The Greenpoint Monitor Museum commemorated the ship and her crew with an event on 12 January 2013 at the grave sites of those Monitor crew members buried in Green-Wood Cemetery in Brooklyn, followed by a service in the cemetery's chapel.

New Jersey–based indie rock band Titus Andronicus named their critically acclaimed second album, 2010's The Monitor, for the ship. Featured on the album's sleeve are the crewmen of Monitor, taken from a tintype portrait. The album's interwoven references to the Civil War include speeches and writings from the period, as well as the side-long closing track "The Battle of Hampton Roads". The latter refers to the Monitor's encounter with CSS Virginia in prominent detail. Singer/guitarist Patrick Stickles commented while making the album that he was inspired by Ken Burns's The Civil War and the ship itself so much that he decided to name Titus Andronicus's second album in its honor.

== Legacy ==
Monitor gave her name to a new type of mastless, low-freeboard warship that mounted its armament in turrets. Many more were built, including river monitors, and they played key roles in Civil War battles on the Mississippi and James Rivers. The breastwork monitor was developed during the 1860s by Sir Edward Reed, Chief Constructor of the Royal Navy, as an improvement of the basic Monitor design. Reed gave these ships a superstructure to increase seaworthiness and raise the freeboard of the gun turrets so they could be worked in all weathers.

The superstructure was armored to protect the bases of the turrets, the funnels and the ventilator ducts in what he termed a breastwork. The ships were conceived as harbor defense ships with little need to leave port. Reed took advantage of the lack of masts and designed the ships with one twin-gun turret at each end of the superstructure, each able to turn and fire in a 270° arc. These ships were described by Admiral George Alexander Ballard as being like "full-armoured knights riding on donkeys, easy to avoid but bad to close with". Reed later developed the design into the Devastation class, the first ocean-going turret ships without masts, the direct ancestors of the pre-dreadnought battleships and the dreadnoughts.

== In popular culture ==
The Monitor is mentioned in the poem Le Bateau ivre by Arthur Rimbaud ('Moi dont les Monitors...'), written in 1871.

The battle between the Monitor and the Confederate ironclad CSS Virginia was reenacted using scale models in the 1936 film Hearts in Bondage from Republic Pictures. The battle was also dramatized in the 1991 made-for-television movie Ironclads, produced by Ted Turner.

== See also ==
- Bibliography of American Civil War naval history
- Bibliography of early United States naval history
- List of monitors of the United States Navy
- List of National Historic Landmarks in North Carolina
- National Register of Historic Places listings in Dare County, North Carolina

== Bibliography ==
- Allen, Thomas B. (2008). Harriet Tubman, Secret Agent: How Daring Slaves and Free Blacks Spied for the Union During the Civil War. National Geographic Books. ISBN 978-1-4263-0401-9.
- Anderson, Bern (1989). By Sea and by River: The Naval History of the Civil War. Da Capo Press. ISBN 978-0-306-80367-3.
- Ballard, G. A. (1980). The Black Battlefleet. Annapolis, Maryland: Naval Institute Press. ISBN 978-0-87021-924-5.
- Baxter, James Phinney, 3rd (1968) [1933]. The Introduction of the Ironclad Warship. Hamden, Connecticut: Archon Books. OCLC 695838727.
- Bennett, Lieutenant, U.S. Navy, Frank M. (1900). The Monitor and the Navy under Steam. Boston and New York: Houghton, Mifflin and Company.
- Broadwater, John D. (2012). USS Monitor: A Historic Ship Completes Its Final Voyage. Texas A&M University Press. ISBN 978-1-60344-473-6.
- Brown, David K. (2003). Warrior to Dreadnought: Warship Development 1860–1905 (reprint of the 1997 ed.). London: Caxton Editions. ISBN 978-1-84067-529-0.
- Campbell, N. J. M. (1979). "United States of America — 'The Old Navy' 1860–1882". In Chesneau, Roger & Kolesnik, Eugene M. (eds.). Conway's All the World's Fighting Ships 1860–1905. Greenwich: Conway Maritime Press. pp. 114–136. ISBN 0-8317-0302-4.
- Canney, Donald L. (1993). The Old Steam Navy. Vol. 2: The Ironclads, 1842–1885. Annapolis, Maryland: Naval Institute Press. ISBN 978-0-87021-586-5.
- Clancy, Paul (2013). Ironclad; The Epic Battle, Calamitous Loss, and Historic Recovery of the USS Monitor. New York: Koehler Books. ISBN 978-1-938467-11-0.
- "Black Dispatches: Black American Contributions to Union Intelligence During the Civil War". Central Intelligence Agency. 7 July 2008. Archived from the original on 2 September 2016.
- Davis, Kenneth C. (1996). Don't Know Much About the Civil War. New York: William Morrow and Co. ISBN 978-0-688-11814-3.
- Davis, William C. (1975). Duel Between the First Ironclads (Book club ed.). Garden City, New York: Doubleday. OCLC 1551282.
- "'USS Monitor Can Be Raised,' Says Top Underwater Salvaging Expert". The Harvard Crimson. 16 April 1951.
- Dinsmore, David A.; Broadwater, John D. (1999). "1998 NOAA Research Expedition to the Monitor National Marine Sanctuary". In Hamilton, RW; Pence, DF; Kesling, DE (eds.). Assessment and Feasibility of Technical Diving Operations for Scientific Exploration. Archived from the original on 28 September 2012.
- DuCoin, Francis J. (April 2024). "A New Look for an Old Icon". Naval History. Vol. 38, no. 2. pp. 14–19.
- Erickson, Mark St. John (4 January 1998). "Sands of time: Part 5 of 5". Orlando Sentinel. Archived from the original on 4 June 2011.
- Field, Ron (2011). Confederate Ironclad vs Union Ironclad: Hampton Roads. Osprey Publishing. ISBN 978-1-78096-141-5.
- Fuller, Howard J (2008). Clad in Iron: The American Civil War and the Challenge of British Naval Power. Annapolis, Maryland: Naval Institute Press. ISBN 978-1-59114-297-3.
- Gardiner, Robert, ed. (1992). Steam, Steel and Shellfire: the Steam Warship 1815–1905. Conway's History of the Ship. London: Conway Maritime Press. ISBN 978-1-55750-774-7.
- Garrison, Webb (1994). Civil War Curiosities: Strange Stories, Oddities, Events and Coincidents. Nashville, Tennessee: Rutledge Hill Press. ISBN 978-1-56865-527-7.
- Gentile, Gary (1993). Ironclad Legacy: Battles of the USS Monitor. Gary Gentile Productions. ISBN 978-0-9621453-8-4.
- Holloway, Anna (2013). The Last Voyage of the USS Monitor (PDF). Newport News, VA: The Mariner's Museum. Archived from the original (PDF) on 4 December 2013.
- Holzer, Harold; Mulligan, Tim (2006). The Battle of Hampton Roads: New Perspectives on the USS Monitor and CSS Virginia. New York: Fordham University Press. ISBN 978-0-8232-2481-4.
- Konstam, Angus (2002). Hampton Roads 1862: First Clash of the Ironclads. Osprey Publishing. ISBN 978-1-84176-410-8. 96 pages.
- Konstam, Angus (25 January 2002). Union Monitor 1861–65. Osprey Publishing. ISBN 978-1-84176-306-4.
- Leckie, Robert (1990). None Died in Vain: The Saga of the American Civil War. New York: Harper-Collins. ISBN 978-0-06-016280-1.
- Maclay, Edgar Stanton (1894). A history of the United States Navy, from 1775 to 1893. New York: D. Appleton & Company.
- Mariners' Museum. "The Naming of the Monitor". Newport News, Virginia: The Mariner's Museum.
- Mariners' Museum. "John Payne Bankhead". Newport News, Virginia: The Mariner's Museum. Archived from the original on 1 June 2013.
- Mariners' Museum. "Last Voyage of the Monitor: December 24th – Forward". Newport News, Virginia: The Mariner's Museum. Archived from the original on 4 September 2013.
- Geer, George S. "George S. Geer Papers, 1862–1866" (PDF). The Mariner's Museum, Newport News, Virginia. Archived from the original (PDF) on 21 July 2013.
- Marvel, William, ed. (2000). The Monitor Chronicles: One Sailor's Account: Today's Campaign to Recover the Civil War Wreck. New York: Simon & Schuster. ISBN 978-0-684-86997-1.
- McCordock, Robert Stanley (1938). The Yankee Cheese Box. Dorrance.
- Mindell, David A. (2000). War, Technology, and Experience Aboard the USS Monitor. Johns Hopkins University Press. ISBN 978-0-8018-6250-2.
- McPherson, James M. (1988). Battle Cry of Freedom. New York: Oxford University Press. ISBN 978-0-19-503863-7.
- "Monitor". Dictionary of American Naval Fighting Ships (DANFS). Naval History & Heritage Command (NH&HC). Archived from the original on 3 July 2013.
- "Monitor's Artifacts". Newport News, Virginia: National Oceanic & Atmospheric Administration, National Marine Sanctuary.
- Nelson, James L. (2009). Reign of Iron: The Story of the First Battling Ironclads, the Monitor and the Merrimack. New York: HarperCollins. ISBN 978-0-06-052404-3.
- Olmstead, Edwin; Stark, Wayne E.; Tucker, Spencer C. (1997). The Big Guns: Civil War Siege, Seacoast, and Naval Cannon. Alexandria Bay, New York: Museum Restoration Service. ISBN 978-0-88855-012-5.
- Park, Carl D. (2007). Ironclad Down: The USS Merrimack-CSS Virginia from Construction to Destruction. Annapolis, Maryland: Naval Institute Press. ISBN 978-1-59114-659-9.
- Parkes, Oscar (1990) [1957]. British Battleships. Annapolis, Maryland: Naval Institute Press. ISBN 978-1-55750-075-5.
- Quarstein, John V. (1999). The Battle of the Ironclads. Arcadia Publishing. ISBN 978-0-7385-0113-0.
- Quarstein, John V. (2006). A History of Ironclads: The Power of Iron Over Wood. The History Press. ISBN 978-1-59629-118-8.
- Quarstein, John V. (2010). The Monitor Boys: The Crew of the Union's First Ironclad. The History Press. ISBN 978-1-59629-455-4.
- Quarstein, John V. (2012). The CSS Virginia: Sink Before Surrender. The History Press. ISBN 978-1-60949-580-0.
- Rawson, Edward K.; Woods, Robert H. (1897). Official Records of the Union and Confederate Navies in the War of the Rebellion. Washington: Government Printing Office.
- Reed, Sir Edward James (1869). Our Iron-Clad Ships: Their Qualities, Performances, and Cost. With Chapters on Turret Ships, Iron-Clad Rams &c. London: J. Murray.
- Rhodes, James Ford (1917). History of the Civil War. New York, Boston, London: Macmillan & Co.
- Roberts, William H. (1999). USS New Ironsides in the Civil War. Annapolis, Maryland: Naval Institute Press. ISBN 978-1-55750-695-5.
- Roberts, William H. (2002). Civil War Ironclads: The U.S. Navy and Industrial Mobilization. Baltimore, Maryland: Johns Hopkins University Press. ISBN 978-0-8018-8751-2.
- Silverstone, Paul H. (2006). Civil War Navies 1855–1883. The U.S. Navy Warship Series. New York: Routledge. ISBN 978-0-415-97870-5.
- "American Civil War Issue". Smithsonian National Postal Museum. Archived from the original on 27 September 2012.
- Southerland, DG; Davidson, DL (2002). "Electronic diving data collection during Monitor expedition 2001". Oceans 2002. Vol. 2. doi:10.1109/OCEANS.2002.1192089. ISBN 978-0-7803-7534-5. S2CID 107060334.
- Stern, Philip Van Doren (1962). The Confederate Navy. New York: Doubleday & Company. LCCN 62-15914.
- Still Jr., William N. (1988). Hill, Dina B. (ed.). Ironclad Captains: The Commanding Officers of the U. S. S. Monitor. Washington, D.C.: National Oceanic and Atmospheric Administration, U.S. Government Printing Office. ISBN 978-0-16-003560-9. 83 pages.
- Sutherland, Jonathan (2004). African Americans at War: An Encyclopedia, Volume 1. ABC-CLIO. ISBN 978-1-57607-746-7.
- Thompson, Stephen C. (1990). "The Design and Construction of the USS Monitor". Warship International. XXVII (3). ISSN 0043-0374.
- Thulesius, Olav (2007). The Man who Made the Monitor: A Biography of John Ericsson, Naval Engineer. Jefferson, North Carolina: McFarland & Company. ISBN 978-0-7864-2766-6.
- Tomblin, Barbara (2009). Bluejackets and Contrabands: African Americans and the Union Navy. University Press of Kentucky. ISBN 978-0-8131-7348-1.
- Tucker, Spencer (2006). Blue & Gray Navies: the Civil War Afloat. Maryland: Naval Institute Press. ISBN 978-1-59114-882-1.
- Varhola, Michael J (1999). Everyday Life During the Civil War. Writer's Digest Books. ISBN 978-1-58297-337-1. 292 pages.
- Wagner, Margaret E.; Gallagher, Gary W.; Finkelman, Paul (2002). The Library of Congress Civil War Desk Reference. New York: Simon & Schuster. ISBN 978-0-684-86350-4.
- Ward, Geoffrey; Burns, Ric; Burns, Ken (1990). The Civil War: An Illustrated History. New York: Alfred A. Knopf. ISBN 978-0-394-56285-8.
- Wilson, H. W. (1896). Ironclads in Action: A Sketch of Naval Warfare From 1855 to 1895. Vol. 1. Boston: Little, Brown.

=== Primary sources ===
- Brooke, John Mercer (2002). Ironclads and Big Guns of the Confederacy: The Journal and Letters of John M. Brooke. Univ of South Carolina Press. ISBN 978-1-57003-418-3.
- Bushnell, Cornelius Scranton; Ericsson, John; Welles, Gideon (1899). The original United States warship "Monitor". New Haven, Connecticut: National Memorial Association.
- Dahlgren, Madeleine Vinton (1882). Memoir of John A. Dahlgren, Rear-Admiral United States Navy. J. R. Osgood.
- Green (USN), Lieutenant Samuel Dana (1862). "Eye-witness Account of the Battle between the U.S.S. Monitor and the C.S.S. Virginia". U.S. Navy, Naval Historical Foundation, Washington, DC. Archived from the original on 8 December 2013.
- Rawson, Edward K., Superintendent Naval War Records; Woods, Robert H. (1898). OFFICIAL RECORDS of the UNION AND CONFEDERATE NAVIES in the WAR OF THE REBELLION. Washington D. C.: Government Printing Office.
- Welles, Gideon (1911). Diary of Gideon Welles, Secretary of the Navy Under Lincoln and Johnson. Vol. 1. Boston and New York: Houghton Mifflin Company.
- Worden, John Lorimer; Greene, Samuel Dana; Ramsay, H. Ashton; Watson, Eugene Winslow (1912). The Monitor and the Merrimac: Both Sides of the Story. New York, London: Harper and Brothers.
