= Louis N. Stodder =

American U.S. Navy officer

Louis N. Stodder

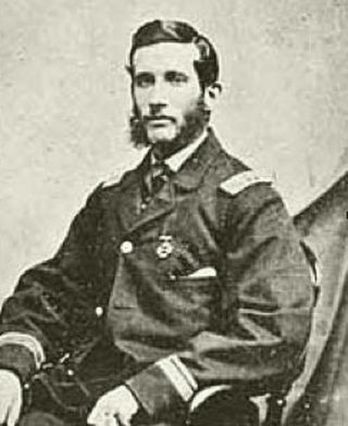
1865 photo of Acting Master Stodder
(unknown photographer)

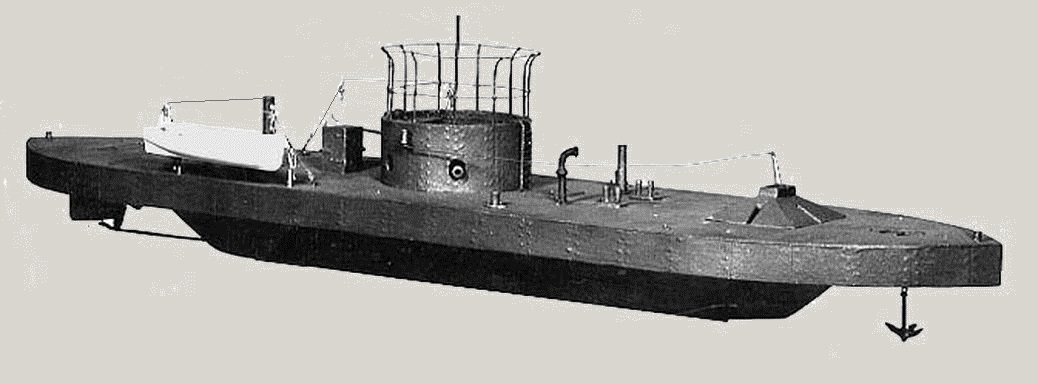
USS Monitor (replica)

Louis Napoleon Stodder (February 12, 1837 – October 8, 1911) was a U.S. Navy officer who served in the American Civil War as acting master on the famous USS Monitor when it fought the Merrimack (Note: Merrimack was abandoned by retreating Union forces at Norfolk, Virginia, later salvaged by Confederate forces and converted to an ironclad and renamed CSS Virginia) at Hampton Roads on March 8–9, 1862. He is also noted for his heroic efforts in the final hours before Monitor sank in a violent storm at sea off Cape Hatteras that same year. He later commanded USS Adela and served in the East Gulf Blockading Squadron. After the Civil War, he was promoted to captain and served with distinction, commanding other vessels and served in other capacities. He continued serving in the Navy until 1902. When he retired, Stodder lived out the remainder of his years in New York.

== Early life ==
Stodder was born on February 12, 1837, in Boston, Massachusetts. He was married to Watie Howland Aldrich, daughter of Alton Aldrich and Mary Earle, of Franconia, New Hampshire on November 15, 1861, shortly after the Civil War began. Little is known about his childhood and early life.

== Civil War service ==
Stodder volunteered for service aboard USS Monitor and served as Acting Master for the entire time she was in service (February 25 through December 31, 1862) and was officially assigned to the vessel on January 31, 1862. He was turret (Note: The turret was the round chamber situated on top of the vessel that contained the ship's two guns) officer and, along with officers Samuel Greene and Chief Engineer, Stimers, commanded and coordinated a sixteen-man gun-crew inside the turret of the Monitor. Designed by John Ericsson, the ship was unusual in its design, being almost completely made of iron and set mostly below the waterline. Stodder, who was present at the Continental Iron Works while the ship was being built, was subsequently skeptical as to whether Ericsson's hulky ironclad vessel would actually float, as were some of the other officers. He was also present when the ship was launched on January 30, 1862 into New York's East River at Greenpoint Brooklyn. Just before the launching, Stodder remarked:

She was rather a hasty job, was the Monitor. – You had better get a good look at her now as you won't see her after she strikes water. She's bound to go to the bottom of the East River and stick there, sure.

To his amazement the vessel slipped into the water and floated, while Ericsson stood on its deck in defiance of all his critics.

=== First battle of the ironclads ===
On the evening of March 8, after a perilous journey at sea, the Monitor finally arrived at Hampton Roads, only to find that the Virginia had already destroyed several ships of the Union's blockading squadron. When daylight came the following morning, the Monitor, to the surprise of the Confederate crew, emerged from behind the Minnesota and engaged the Virginia directly. During the first epic battle of the ironclads, Stodder operated the burdensome control wheel that turned the turret into position, allowing her guns to bear on the Confederate ironclad. The ironclads battled for four hours. Each ship ineffectually pounded the other at close range with cannon fire, changing the way most naval battles would be fought in the future. During the battle, Stodder and officers Stimers and Truscott were inside the gun turret, talking over matters and positioned such that they were leaning against the turret's inside side when it took a direct hit. Knocked unconscious, Stodder, who was replaced by Stimers, was taken below, where it took him an hour to regain consciousness. He thus became the first man injured at the Battle of Hampton Roads. He was replaced by Chief Engineer Stimers for the duration. After regaining consciousness, Stodder recalled, "I was flung by the concussion clean over the guns to the floor of the turret."

=== Service on the James River ===
Stodder also served aboard the Monitor at the Battle of Drewry's Bluff. The ironclad tried to make her way up the James River and past the blockade in the river, but it was too heavily guarded by the guns of Fort Darling and other shore batteries. Stodder later claimed, "If we had a regiment of men we could have taken that fort."

During the last week of June, the Monitor provided naval support for General McClellan's forces along the banks of the James River during the Peninsula Campaign by covering McClellan's withdrawal from the area. While stationed there, at Harrison's Landing, the heat was so intense that Stodder later wrote, "It was hell, being 170 degrees in the fireroom, and on the berth deck it was 95 degrees".

After her service on the James River, the Monitor was put into drydock for repairs in Washington's navy yard in September. Upon completion in November, a notice was placed in the newspaper which stated that the ship would be put on display. Tourists, who turned out by the thousands, were allowed to board and tour the vessel. Stodder and other officers were assigned to oversee the event. When it was over, Stodder noted:

[tourists]...went through the ship, like a flock of magpies, prying loose as souvenirs anything removable. When we came up to clean that night there was not a key, doorknob, escutcheon – there wasn't a thing that hadn't been carried away.

=== The Monitors's final voyage ===
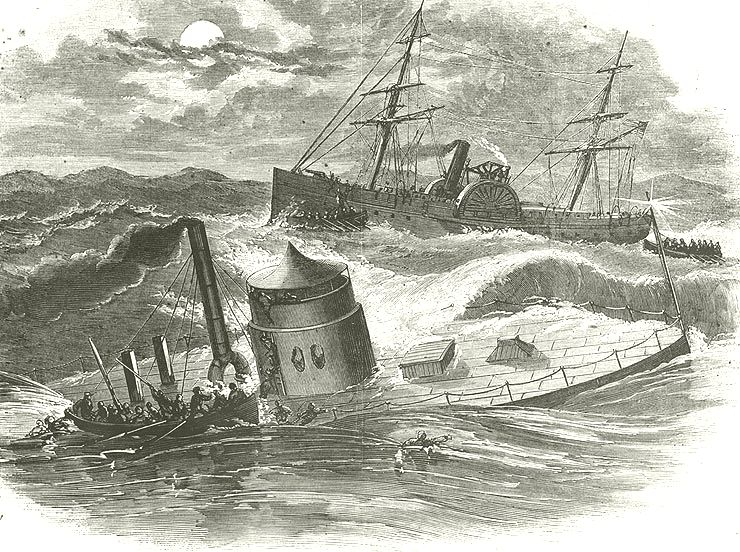
Engraving of Monitor sinking

On December 30, 1862, while serving under Commander John P. Bankhead, Stodder played a fundamental role in the prolonged attempts to save the Monitor from sinking while being towed to North Carolina by USS Rhode Island during a violent storm some sixteen 16 miles (26 km) off the coast of Cape Hatteras. As the storm grew in intensity, the connecting tow line threatened the safety of both ships as they heaved to and fro in the turbulent sea. At 10:30 p.m., Bankhead gave the order for the red distress lantern to be hoisted atop the turret. The engines were slowed to preserve steam for the pumps. However, the reduced speed made the towline very taut, causing the Monitor to become unstable and almost impossible to control. Bankhead ordered the towline cut and called for volunteers to go out onto the deck to carry out the task. Stodder and two other volunteers came forward. As they climbed down the turret onto the low freeboard deck, the other two men were quickly swept overboard and drowned. He later wrote that "it was not an easy job" and was himself almost washed overboard by the large waves splashing over the low freeboard (deck), but he managed to hang onto the safety lines around the deck and continued making his way to the tow line. He managed to cut through a tow line, 13 inches (330 mm) in diameter, using a hatchet. In the final minutes before the Monitor sank, Stodder made several attempts to go below deck in complete darkness to aid any crew members needing assistance. He found the wounded engineer Lewis, still bedded, who refused to be moved. Stodder later reported about his unfortunate encounter with Lewis:

I told him the ship was sinking, and that he had better take his chances in the open. He refused however, to do so and, not being strong enough to carry him, I had to leave him to his fate.

Stodder survived the sinking, and he and other rescued officers and crew were transferred to the Rhode Island. Stodder was one of two officers who remained with Bankhead, who was the last surviving man to abandon the sinking Monitor. In his official report of the Monitor's sinking to the Navy Department, Bankhead praised Stodder for his heroic efforts and wrote, "I would beg leave to call the attention of the Admiral and of the Department of the particularly good conduct of Lieutenant Greene and Acting Master Louis N. Stodder, who remained with me until the last, and by their example did much toward inspiring confidence and obedience on the part of the others."

Some time after the sinking, a controversy emerged over why the Monitor sank. In the Army and Navy Journal, Ericsson accused the crew of drunkenness during the storm and consequently being unable to prevent the vessel from sinking. Stodder vigorously defended the crew and rebuked Ericsson's characterization of the crew and events and wrote to Pierce that Ericsson "cover's up defects by blaming those that are now dead," pointing out that there were several technical problems that led to the ship's sinking, foremost being the overhang between the upper and lower hulls which came loose and partially separated during the storm from slamming into the violent waves. Stodder's account was corroborated by his shipmates.

=== Other Civil War service ===
In 1863, Stodder was commander of USS Adela, a former blockade runner which was attached to the East Gulf Blockading Squadron. Before departing to join the squadron, the Adela was in need of coal and arrived on August 4, 1863, at Port Royal, South Carolina, to resupply the ship. After waiting ten days, Stodder soon realized that the coal supplies were exhausted. During his wait, another ship, the bark Faith, laden with coal, struck the nearby shoals and bilged. Stodder requested and received permission from her senior officer to salvage the Faith's coal. For three days, the crew of the Adela were up to their necks in water salvaging about 25 tons. During this time, another supply vessel arrived, carrying 1400 tons of coal. His crew exhausted, Stodder ordered the salvaging operation to stop, hoping to obtain a supply from the arriving vessel.

Stodder also served aboard USS Ohio when it was outfitted as a receiving ship.

== Post-Civil War service ==
Stodder's post-Civil War service was very distinguished. He joined the U.S. Revenue Cutter Service as a third lieutenant. He was honorably discharged as an Acting Volunteer Lieutenant on January 10, 1863. The following February, for his heroic role aboard the Monitor, he was awarded a sword on which were engraved the words: "Presented to Lieut. Louis N. Stodder By his Boston Friends February 9, 1863 "Monitor" on guard." In 1999, the sword was auctioned by a prominent New York auction firm and realized more than $43,000.

In 1879, he was promoted to captain and was given command of USS Oliver Wolcott. On January 11, 1883, while still captain of this vessel, he subdued an Indian uprising at Fort Simpson, British Columbia.

In 1892, Stodder was named supervisor of anchorages at the Port of New York, remaining in that position until 1901. He retired from service the following year.

== Later life ==
When Ericsson died in 1889, his body was sent to Sweden for burial on August 23, 1890, at the request of the Swedish government. It was loaded aboard a Navy warship with a full ceremony attended by Stodder, along with the Secretary of the Navy and former Monitor crew members.

In 1906, Albert Stevens Crockett, a young reporter for the New York Herald, interviewed Stodder, who was retired and living in New York, the last surviving officer of the Monitor. Stodder was initially reluctant to talk about himself, so it took some persuading by Crockett to get Stodder to provide a first-hand account of the Monitor's history. Stodder's hair and mustache were now white, but Crockett noted that the former officer was still "erect of figure and had the air and voice of a strict disciplinarian, though with a keen sense of humor and an enjoyment of life." Stodder's account helped historians piece together the story of the short-lived Monitor.

Louis Stodder was the last surviving crew member of the Monitor, living well into the 20th century.

Following a nervous breakdown, Stodder died of cerebral apoplexy and pulmonary edema in Brooklyn, New York, October 8, 1911, at the age of 74. He is buried at Green-Wood Cemetery in Brooklyn.

== See also ==
- Union Navy
- Confederate Navy
- Ships of the Union navy
- List of ships of the Confederate States Navy

== Bibliography ==
- Church, William Conant (1911). The Life of John Ericsson. Charles Scribner, New York. p. 660., eBook
- "Aboard the U.S.S. 'Monitor' by Capt. Louis N. Stodder (as told to Albert Stevens Crockett)". Civil War Times Illustrated. 1963.
- Criswell, Robert L. (2013). "USS MONITOR/Aldrich connection". National Aldrich Assoc.
- Davis, William C. (1975). Duel Between the First Ironclads (Book club ed.). Garden City, New York: Doubleday. p. 201. OCLC 1551282.
- Daniels, Secretary of the Navy, Josephus; Marsh, Captain, U.S.Navy, C.C. (1921). 'Official records of the Union and Confederate navies in the War of the Rebellion. Government Printing Office, United States; Naval War Records Office, Office of Naval Records and Library. p. 980., eBook
- "150th Anniversary of the Sinking of the USS Monitor". The Greenpoint Monitor Museum.
- Fuller, Howard J (2008). Clad in Iron – The American Civil War and the Challenge of British Naval Power. Annapolis, Maryland: Naval Institute Press. p. 409. ISBN 978-1-59114-297-3.
- Hoehling, Adolph A. (1993). Thunder at Hampton Roads. Da Capo Press. p. 231. ISBN 9780306805233., Book (par view)
- Holzer, Harold (2013). The Battle of Hampton Roads: New Perspectives on the Uss Monitor And the Css Virginia. New York: Penguin Books: New York Historical Society. p. 416., Book
- Maclay, Edgar Stanton (1894). A history of the United States Navy, from 1775 to 1893. D. Appleton & Company, New York. p. 647. eBook
- Mariners' Museum. "Timeline: Last Voyage of the Monitor: December 24th - Forward". Newport News, Virginia: The Mariner's Museum.
- ——. "The Last Voyage of the USS Monitor". Newport News, Virginia: The Mariner's Museum.
- Mindell, David A. (2000). War, Technology, and Experience Aboard the USS Monitor. JHU Press. p. 187. ISBN 9780801862502., Book (par view)
- Lieutenant Samuel Dana Green, U.S.N. (1862). "An Eye-Witness Account of the Battle Between the U.S.S. Monitor and the C.S.S. Virginia". Naval Historical Foundation, Washington, DC. Archived from the original on July 2, 2013.
- Quarstein, John V. (1999). The Battle of the Ironclads. Arcadia Publishing. p. 128. ISBN 9780738501130., Book
- —— (2006). A History of Ironclads: The Power of Iron Over Wood. The History Press. p. 284. ISBN 9781596291188., Book
- —— (2010). The Monitor Boys: The Crew of the Union's First Ironclad. The History Press. p. 349. ISBN 9781596294554., Book
- Still, William N. (1988). Hill, Dina B. (ed.). Ironclad Captains: The Commanding Officers of the U. S. S. Monitor. Washington, D.C.: National Oceanic and Atmospheric Administration, U.S. Government Printing Office. p. 83. ISBN 9780160035609., Book (no preview)
- Thulesius, Olav (2007). The Man who Made the Monitor: A Biography of John Ericsson, Naval Engineer. Jefferson, North Carolina: McFarland & Company. p. 255. ISBN 978-0-7864-2766-6., Book (par view)
- White, William Chapman; White, Ruth Morris (1957). Tin can on a shingle. Dutton Publishers. pp. 176 pages. Book (snippet view)
