= Hallelujah the Hills =

- Origin: Boston, Massachusetts, U.S.
- Genres: Indie rock Alternative rock Lo-fi music Folk rock
- Years active: 2005–present
- Labels: Misra, Discrete Pageantry Records, Jealous Butcher Records, Re-Vinyl Records
- Members: Ryan H. Walsh; Ryan Connelly; Brian Rutledge; Joseph Marrett; Nicholas Ward; David Michael Curry
- Past members: Eric Meyer; David Bentley; Elio DeLuca; Matt Brown; Dave Bryson; Peter Negroponte; Matthew Glover
- Website: Official website

Hallelujah the Hills is an American indie rock band from Boston, Massachusetts, formed in late 2005 by Ryan H. Walsh. They have been described by The Boston Globe as "the sound of music without limits", "criminally underappreciated" by Spin magazine, and have been praised by Pitchfork Media for their "vivid lyrics", "knack for crafting fist-pumping anthems" and “shambolic, maximalist barroom aura”. They've been hailed as an “indie rock institution in Boston" and Aquarium Drunkard has declared that “few do it with the style and imagination of Hallelujah the Hills.”

== Career ==
The band formed just weeks after the final show from Walsh and drummer Eric Meyer's former band, the Stairs. Initial buzz around Hallelujah the Hills' early live shows and demo recordings led to signing with Misra Records in 2006. The band released their first two albums on Misra Records, Collective Psychosis Begone and Colonial Drones, while frequently touring the U.S. The band has a penchant for unusual collaborations; they've co-written a song with Triumph the Insult Comic Dog, collaborated with author Jonathan Lethem, and often solicited and incorporated recordings of their fans speaking written passages into their songs.

In 2009, the band helped arrange and record the Titus Andronicus album The Monitor. All trumpet, cello, keyboards, and piano parts for the album were recorded with Hallelujah the Hills in Boston in August 2009, including Walsh's backing vocals on "A More Perfect Union" and "Titus Andronicus Forever". After the album's release, the two bands toured together with Hallelujah the Hills opening, and then joining Titus Andronicus halfway through their set to form a large band that recreated the album's arrangements. During the Titus Andronicus after-party show for 2010's Pitchfork Festival, Hallelujah the Hills singer Ryan Walsh took on Jenn Wasner's vocal part to perform the Titus duet "To Old Friends And New".

Pitchfork wrote that the band's sophomore album, Colonial Drones, found the band jumping "to the accelerated class" while Blurt magazine called it "a rough-hewn classic." In support of the release, the band toured with The Silver Jews which led to the collaboration on the song "Classic Tapes" in which Jews' bassist Cassie Berman sings with Hills singer Ryan Walsh. After their third drummer Peter Negroponte quit on-stage during a live concert, the band began working with longtime Son Volt drummer Dave Bryson on new songs. During this time, Misra Records changed ownership, and the band's contract was not renewed.

Hallelujah The Hills' third full-length album No One Knows What Happens Next was funded by a successful Kickstarter project and was declared "a daring move" by Prefix Magazine for its stripped down arrangements and lack of distortion. It was called a "gorgeous start-to-finish listen" by Dig Boston. Shortly after recording sessions for No One Knows What Happens Next ended, Walsh wrote a large feature for The Boston Phoenix in which he admitted to being the ringleader behind the 2008 file-sharing hoax, "The Overdub Tampering Committee". The band also performed at the site of the Boston Occupy movement around this time, later learning they were surveilled by BRIC (Boston Regional Intelligence Center) for the performance.

In May 2013, the band released a collection of B-sides, non-album tracks, and rarities entitled Portrait Of The Artist As A Young Trashcan. In a Boston Herald profile published around that same time, the band was singled out for their recent turn of writing about writing, posing the question "It takes genius to write a great song about writing a song. So how is it Hallelujah The Hills has done it twice in two years?"

Recorded at 1809 Studios in Macedon, New York, the band finished the fourth album in five days in early 2014. In a blog entry posted during the sessions, Walsh hinted that the album had some connection to The Fox Sisters who are regularly credited as being the accidental inventors of the Spiritualist movement in America in the late-1800s. Have You Ever Done Something Evil? was released on May 13, 2014. The album was a critical success, earning the band high praise from SPIN, Stereogum, Noisey, Blurt magazine and more. Popmatters declared the album the "#1 Overlooked Album of the Year," calling it the band's "masterstroke." Evil's first single "Pick Up An Old Phone" was subsequently BBC Radio6's song of the day in April 2014. The band won two Boston Music Awards for Evil including Best Rock Act and Best Video.

Following the album's release, the band toured California performing a week of live dates and an appearance on the Improv4Humans podcast, wherein comedians Matt Besser, Lauren Lapkus, and others created comedic scenes based on live performances of the band's songs. This podcast recording happened just hours after the band was robbed in Oakland, California where all of the band's personal items and merchandise was stolen while they were on stage at The New Parish. Taking part in a live-streamed interview series called "Behind The Album," songwriter Ryan Walsh likened the odds of their fourth album coming together the way it did to "pulling off a heist."

On April 12, 2016, Hallelujah The Hills returned with A Band Is Something To Figure Out, their fifth full-length album, recorded almost ten years to the day of their first rehearsal. The making of the album was documented by UK author M. Jonathan Lee for an in-progress book about the band. Punk News called the album "an extensive look inside the human psyche, all set to a gorgeous soundtrack." Metro Boston wrote, "These 11 songs, loaded with gritty determination, dramatic dynamic swells and gang vocal shouts, might just make you believe again in whatever it was you stopped believing in" while DigBoston noted the band's staying power: "In Boston, a city ripe with remarkable rock acts…local treasure Hallelujah The Hills sits at the top of that throne."

The band toured less than usual following that release due to Walsh working on his debut book, Astral Weeks: A Secret History of 1968, published by Penguin Press in March 2018. The band, joined by new member David Michael Curry, recorded new original instrumental music to augment the book's audiobook format, later deciding to release the tracks as an album titled Against Electricity. Music blog If It's Too Loud explained, "There are two things Boston's Hallelujah the Hills do incredibly well: Catchy roots based rock songs and experimental instrumental noise rock. Their sixth album, Against Electricity, was just released yesterday and it fits squarely in the latter category."

Hallelujah the Hills’ 2019's album, entitled I’m You, was declared “Album of the Year” by Glorious Noise, “a lyrical masterpiece” by Metro U.S., and earned a 9/10 rating from The Line of Best Fit. WBUR wrote that the album was a” Ginsberg-esque telling of present-day America backed by a band with a similar chaotic synchronicity as the band from Ziggy Stardust.” I'm You also features a guest appearance by Astral Weeks' musician John Payne and features the first released song that Walsh co-wrote with his wife, Marissa Nadler. Walsh candidly spoke about the difficult period he went through leading up to the release of I’m You on the RIYL podcast in August of 2020. The band’s first ever European tour, scheduled for the summer of 2020, was canceled due to COVID-19. They released one new song in 2020 entitled “Popular Anti-Depressants of the 21st Century,” which was described by music critic Alex Wisgard as “exactly as devastating and incisive as I'm You, if not more so.” Walsh's hyper-detailed stop-motion animation video for “The Memory Tree” was released in October 2020 in which a lonely ghost finds a way to reverse the order of things and become human again.

== Members ==
- Ryan Walsh – guitar, lead vocals, samples
- Nicholas Ward – bass, guitar, piano, vocals
- Brian Rutledge – trumpet, trombone, keyboards, vocals
- Joseph Marrett – guitar, bass, banjo, cuatro, tambo, percussion, vocals
- Ryan Connelly – drums, vocals
- David Michael Curry – viola

== Discography ==
=== Albums ===
- Collective Psychosis Begone (2007, Misra)
- Colonial Drones (2009, Misra)
- No One Knows What Happens Next (2012, Discrete Pageantry)
- Portrait Of The Artist As A Young Trashcan (2013, Discrete Pageantry)
- Have You Ever Done Something Evil? (2014, Discrete Pageantry & Re-Vinyl Records)
- A Band Is Something To Figure Out (2016, Discrete Pageantry & Re-Vinyl Records)
- Against Electricity (2018, Discrete Pageantry & Jealous Butcher Records)
- I'm You (2019, Discrete Pageantry Records)
- Deck (2025, a four-album series following I'm You)
  - Clubs
  - Diamonds
  - Hearts
  - Spades

=== EPs ===
- Prepare to Qualify EP (2008, Misra Records)
- Juvenile Oratorios (2015, Discrete Pageantry)
- Movement Scorekeepers (2016, Discrete Pageantry, Jealous Butcher Records)

=== Singles, mixtapes, and live albums ===
- Popular Anti-Depressants of the 21st Century (2020 single)
- The World Is Most Certainly Haunted And I Am One Of Its Best Ghosts (2020 mix tape)
- Folk Music Is Insane (The I'm You Demos, 2020)
- BOOTLEG: The Oldest Recorded Song In Music History (Live 1/21/20)
- BOOTLEG: Rock N Roll Improved My Chemistry (Live 3/13/20)
- BOOTLEG: LIVE at the Cake Shop (Live 7/29/2016)
- BOOTLEG: Collective Psychosis Begone (Live 1/4/2008)
- BOOTLEG: LIVE Improvised Set (Live 2/3/2018)
