= The Monitor (album) =

Studio album by Titus Andronicus
- Released: March 9, 2010
- Recorded: August 2009
- Genre: Indie rock
- Length: 65:24
- Label: XL
- Producer: Kevin McMahon

Titus Andronicus chronology
The Airing of Grievances (2008)	The Monitor (2010)	Local Business (2012)

The Monitor is the second studio album by American indie rock band Titus Andronicus, released in March 2010 through XL Recordings. It is a concept album loosely based on themes relating to the American Civil War.

The album title is a reference to the USS Monitor, the first ironclad warship commissioned by the United States Navy, and the closing track, "The Battle of Hampton Roads", refers to the battle between the Monitor and the CSS Virginia, which took place on March 8–9, 1862; according to the band, "Releasing this record is our way of celebrating the 148th anniversary of this historic event." There are numerous references to early Billy Bragg songs such as some lyrics in "A More Perfect Union" and the song "Richard II". "A More Perfect Union" also includes references to the band's New Jersey roots as well as riffs on the lyrics of Bruce Springsteen, another New Jersey native. The Monitor features guest appearances by members of Ponytail, Wye Oak, Hallelujah The Hills, Felice Brothers, Spider Bags, Vivian Girls and the Hold Steady.

== Reception ==
Professional ratings
Aggregate scores
Source	Rating
AnyDecentMusic?	7.6/10
Metacritic	82/100
Review scores
Source	Rating
AllMusic	4.5/5 stars
The A.V. Club	B+
The Guardian	4/5 stars
Los Angeles Times	3.5/4 stars
Mojo	4/5 stars
MSN Music (Consumer Guide)	A−
NME	7/10
Pitchfork	8.7/10
Rolling Stone	3.5/5 stars
Spin	8/10

The Monitor received a Metacritic score of 82 out of 100, signaling universal acclaim. Pitchfork included the album in their list of top albums of 2010, at No. 10 while Spectrum Culture gave the album its No. 1 position. "The Monitor" was named Exclaim!'s No. 20 Pop & Rock Album of 2010.

The album was recognized as No. 30 of The 100 Best Albums of the Decade So Far by Pitchfork Media in August 2014.

== Track listing ==
All tracks written by Patrick Stickles.

2010 release

1. "A More Perfect Union" – 7:09
2. "Titus Andronicus Forever" – 1:55
3. "No Future Part Three: Escape From No Future" – 5:16
4. "Richard II or Extraordinary Popular Dimensions and the Madness of Crowds (Responsible Hate Anthem)" – 5:06
5. "A Pot in Which to Piss" – 8:53
6. "Four Score and Seven" – 8:38
7. "Theme from Cheers" – 5:01
8. "To Old Friends and New" – 7:00
9. "...And Ever" – 2:24
10. "The Battle of Hampton Roads" – 14:02

Vinyl 2 LP version

- Side A: 1–4
- Side B: 5–6
- Side C: 7–9
- Side D: 10

2021 remaster

Note: The timings of tracks 4, 5, 6, 9 & 10 differ on the remaster, primarily due to index changes. Tracks 4 & 5 no longer segue, and a longer, pre-vocal drone is moved to the beginning of track 5. On the remaster, track 4 is (4:10) and 5 is (10:06). Track 6 includes a slightly longer fadeout, and additional silence, now totaling (8:46). Lincoln's speech is moved from the end of track 9 to the beginning of 10; the result is track 9 is (1:31) and 10 is (14:57). The remaster is 23 seconds longer overall.

== Personnel ==
Per the album liner notes:

=== Titus Andronicus ===
- Patrick Stickles – lead vocals, guitar, synthesizer, piano, electronics, harmonica
- Liam Betson – guitar, vocals
- Ian Graetzer – bass guitar
- Eric Harm – drums, percussion, vocals

=== Additional musicians ===
- Julian Veronesi – vocals
- Dan McGee – vocals
- Matt Miller – vocals
- Brendan Stickles – vocals
- Ryan Walsh – vocals
- Andrew Cedermark – guitar
- Pete Feigenbaum – guitar
- Kevin McMahon – guitar, percussion, vocals
- Ian O'Neil – guitar, vocals
- Jenn Wasner – guitar, vocals
- Dustin Wong – guitar
- David Bentley – cello
- Greg Farley – fiddle
- Brett Bondar – Highland bagpipes, Scottish small pipes
- Peter Buettner – tenor saxophone
- Dean Jones – trombone
- Brian Rutledge – trumpet
- Elio DeLuca – piano, electric piano, organ, vocals
- Ian Dykstra – bass drums, sleigh bells, tambourine
- Alex Tretiak – snare drums, vocals

The Monitor Players

- Okey Canfield Chenoweth III – as Abraham Lincoln
- Cassie Ramone – as Jefferson Davis
- Craig Finn – as Walt Whitman, quoting "Vigil Strange I Kept on the Field One Night"

=== Production ===
- Kevin McMahon – producer, recording, mixing
- Elio DeLuca – additional recording
- Andy Stack – additional recording
- Patrick Stickles – incidental four-track recording, tape operator
- Dustin Miller – vocal recording
- Craig Calbi – mastering
- Nolen Strals – layout
- Alex Tretiak – research assistant
