= Battle of Hampton Roads =

1862 battle of the American Civil War

- Part of the American Civil War
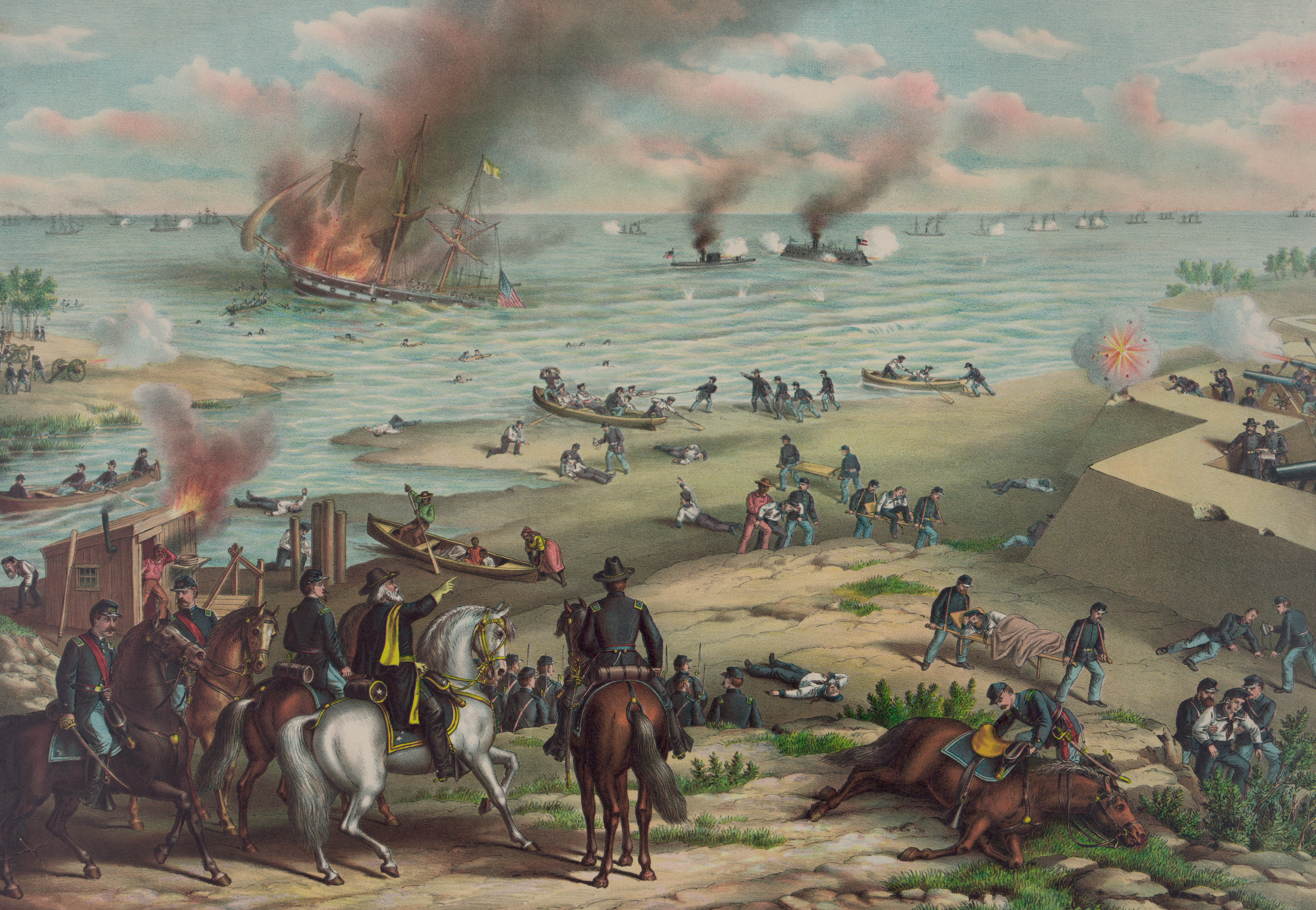
- 1889 illustration of the battle
Date	March 8, 1862 – March 9, 1862
Location	Off Sewell's Point, Hampton Roads 36°59′0″N 76°19′11″W
Result	Inconclusive

Belligerents
United States (Union)	Confederate States

Commanders and leaders
John Marston; John Worden (WIA)	Franklin Buchanan (WIA); Catesby Jones

Strength
1 ironclad (Monitor); 5 frigates 6 auxiliary boats 2 forts 1 shore battery	1 ironclad (Virginia); 2 wooden warships 1 gunboat 2 tenders 1 shore battery

Casualties and losses
261 killed 108 wounded 2 frigates sunk 2 frigates damaged 1 ironclad damaged 3 auxiliary boats damaged	7 killed 17 wounded 1 ironclad damaged 1 gunboat damaged

The Battle of Hampton Roads, also referred to as the Battle of the Monitor and Merrimack or the Battle of Ironclads, was a naval battle during the American Civil War.

The battle was fought over two days, March 8 and 9, 1862, in Hampton Roads, a roadstead in Virginia where the Elizabeth and Nansemond rivers meet the James River just before it flows into Chesapeake Bay by the city of Norfolk. The battle was a part of the effort of the Confederacy to break the Union blockade, which had cut off Virginia's largest cities and major industrial centers, Norfolk and Richmond, from international trade. This battle was significant in that it was the first combat between ironclad warships, the USS Monitor and CSS Virginia. The Confederate fleet consisted of the ironclad ram Virginia (built from remnants of the burned steam frigate USS Merrimack) and several supporting vessels. On the first day of battle, they were opposed by several conventional, wooden-hulled ships of the Union Navy.

On that day, the Virginia was able to destroy two ships of the Union flotilla, USS Congress and USS Cumberland, and was about to attack a third, USS Minnesota, which had run aground. However, the action was halted by darkness and falling tide, so Virginia retired to take care of her few wounded—which included her captain, Flag Officer Franklin Buchanan—and repair her minimal battle damage.

Determined to complete the destruction of Minnesota, Catesby ap Roger Jones, acting as captain in Buchanan's absence, returned the ship to the fray the next morning, March 9. During the night, however, the ironclad Monitor had arrived and had taken a position to defend Minnesota. When Virginia approached, Monitor intercepted her. The two ironclads fought for about three hours, with neither able to inflict significant damage on the other. The duel ended indecisively, Virginia returning to her home at the Gosport Navy Yard for repairs and strengthening, and Monitor to her station defending Minnesota. The ships did not fight again, and the blockade remained in place.

The battle received worldwide attention, having immediate effects on navies around the world. The preeminent naval powers, Great Britain and France, halted further construction of wooden-hulled ships, and others followed suit. Although Britain and France had been engaged in an iron-clad arms race since the 1830s, the Battle of Hampton Roads signaled a new age of naval warfare had arrived for the whole world. A new type of warship, monitor, was produced on the principle of the original. The use of a small number of very heavy guns, mounted so that they could fire in all directions, was first demonstrated by Monitor but soon became standard in warships of all types. Shipbuilders also incorporated rams into the designs of warship hulls for the rest of the century.

== Background ==
=== The blockade at Norfolk ===
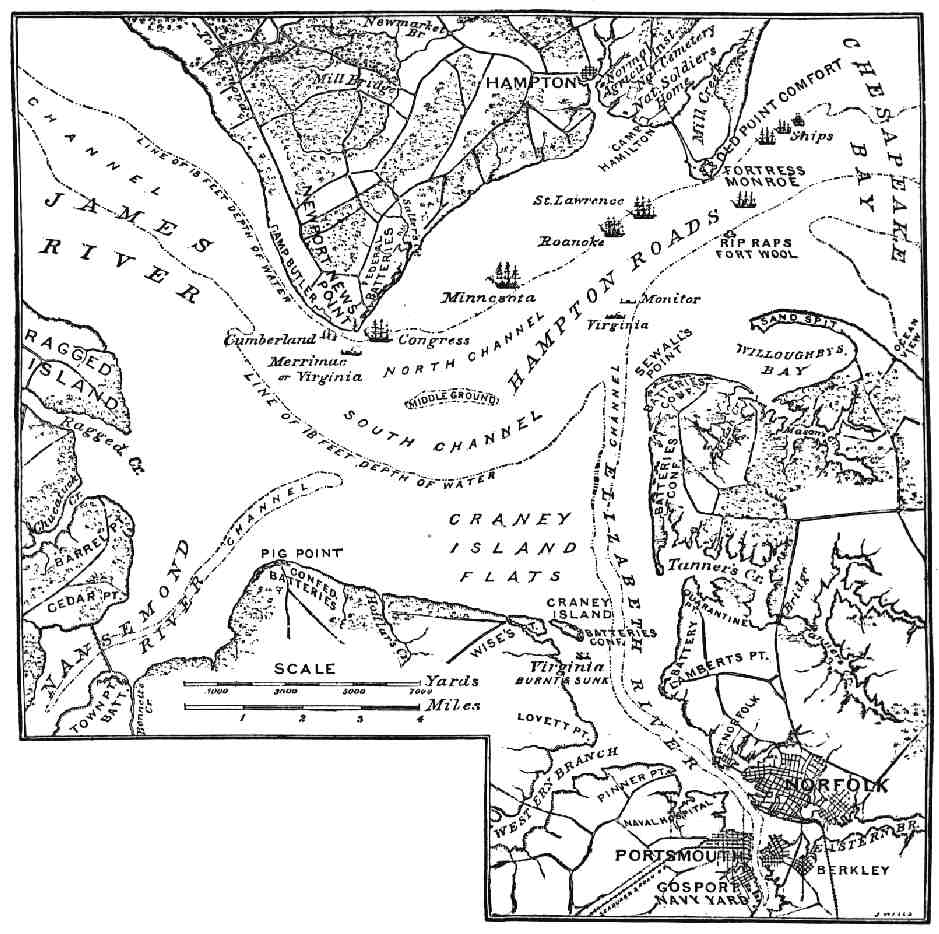
Map of events of the Battle of Hampton Roads

On April 19, 1861, shortly after the outbreak of hostilities at Charleston Harbor, US President Abraham Lincoln proclaimed a blockade of ports in the seceded states. On April 27, after Virginia and North Carolina had also passed ordinances of secession, the blockade was extended to include their ports also. Even before the extension, local troops had seized the Norfolk area and threatened the Gosport Navy Yard in Portsmouth. The commandant there, Captain Charles S. McCauley, though loyal to the Union, was immobilized by advice he received from his subordinate officers, most of whom were in favor of secession. Although he had orders from (Union) Secretary of the Navy Gideon Welles to move his ships to Northern ports, he refused to act until April 20, when he gave orders to scuttle the ships in the yard and destroy its facilities.

At least nine ships were burned, among them the screw frigate USS Merrimack. Merrimack burned only to the waterline, however, and her engines were more or less intact. The destruction of the navy yard was mostly ineffective; in particular, the large drydock there was relatively undamaged and soon could be restored. Without firing a shot, the advocates of secession had gained for the South its largest navy yard, as well as the hull and engines of what would be in time its most famous warship. They had also seized more than a thousand heavy guns, plus gun carriages and large quantities of gunpowder.

With Norfolk and its navy yard in Portsmouth, the Confederacy controlled the southern side of Hampton Roads. To prevent Union warships from attacking the yard, the Confederates set up batteries at Sewell's Point and Craney Island, at the juncture of the Elizabeth River with the James. (See map.) The Union retained possession of Fort Monroe, at Old Point Comfort on the Virginia Peninsula. They also held a small man-made island known as the Rip Raps, on the far side of the channel opposite Fort Monroe, and on this island they completed another fort, named Fort Wool. With Fort Monroe went control of the lower Peninsula as far as Newport News.

Forts Monroe and Wool gave the Union forces control of the entrance to Hampton Roads. The blockade, initiated on April 30, 1861, cut off Norfolk and Richmond from the sea almost completely. To further the blockade, the Union Navy stationed some of its most powerful warships in the roadstead. There, they were under the shelter of the shore-based guns of Fort Monroe and the batteries at Hampton and Newport News and out of the range of the guns at Sewell's Point and Craney Island. For most of the first year of the war, the Confederacy could do little to oppose or dislodge them.

=== Birth of the ironclads ===
When steam propulsion began to be applied to warships, naval constructors renewed their interest in armor for their vessels. Experiments had been tried with armor during the Crimean War (1853–1856), just prior to the American Civil War, and the British and French navies had each built armored ships and were planning to build others. In 1860 the French Navy commissioned La Gloire, the world's first ocean-going ironclad warship. Great Britain followed a year later with HMS Warrior, the world's first armor-plated iron-hulled warship. The use of armor remained controversial, however, and the United States Navy was generally reluctant to embrace the new technology.

==== CSS Virginia ====
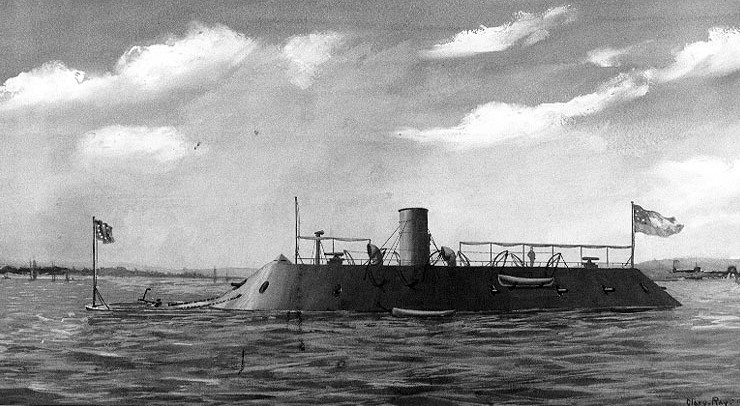
CSS Virginia (ex-USS Merrimack)

When the Civil War broke out in 1861, Confederate Secretary of the Navy Stephen R. Mallory was an early enthusiast for the advantages of armor. As he looked upon it, the Confederacy could not match the industrial North in numbers of ships at sea, so they would have to compete by building vessels that individually outclassed those of the Union. Armor would provide the edge. Mallory gathered about himself a group of men who could put his vision into practice, among them John M. Brooke, John L. Porter, and William P. Williamson.

When Mallory's men searched the South for factories that could build engines to drive the heavy ships that he wanted, they found no place to do it immediately. At the best facility, the Tredegar Iron Works in Richmond, building engines from scratch would take at least a year. Upon learning this, Williamson suggested taking the engines from the hulk of Merrimack, recently raised from the bed of the Elizabeth River. His colleagues promptly accepted his suggestion and expanded it, proposing that the design of their projected ironclad be adapted to the hull. Porter produced the revised plans, which were submitted to Mallory for approval.

On July 11, 1861, the new design was accepted, and work began almost immediately. The burned-out hull was towed into a graving dock that the Union Navy had failed to destroy. During the subsequent conversion process, the plans developed further, incorporating an iron ram fitted to the prow. The remodeled ship's weaponry, in addition to the ram, consisted of 10 guns: six 9 in (230 mm) smooth-bore Dahlgrens, two 6.4 in (160 mm) and two 7 in (180 mm) Brooke rifles. Trials showed that these rifles firing solid shot would pierce up to eight inches of armor plating.

The Tredegar Iron works could produce both solid shot and shell, and since it was believed that Virginia would face only wooden ships, she was given only the explosive shell. The armor plating, originally meant to be 1 in (25 mm) thick, was replaced by double plates, each 2 in (51 mm) thick, backed by 24 in (61 cm) of iron and pine. The armor was pierced for 14 gunports: four on each broadside, three forward, and three aft. The revisions, together with the usual problems associated with the transportation system of the South, resulted in delays that pushed out the launch date until February 3, 1862, and she was not commissioned until February 17, bearing the name CSS Virginia.

==== USS Monitor ====
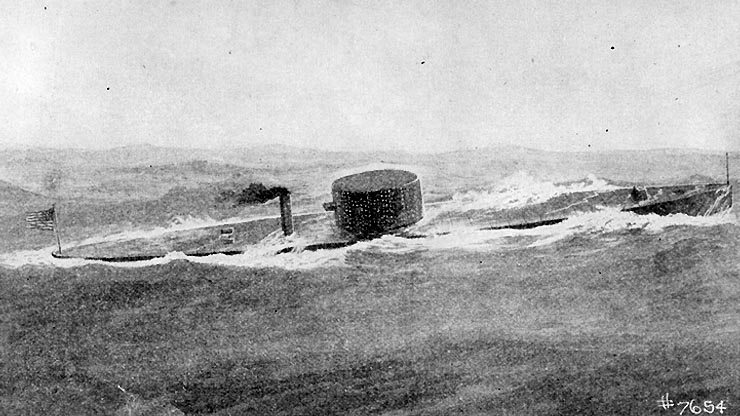
USS Monitor

Intelligence that the Confederates were working to develop an ironclad caused consternation for the Union, but Secretary of the Navy Gideon Welles waited for Congress to meet to request permission to consider building armored vessels; Congress gave this permission on August 3, 1861. Welles appointed a commission, which became known as the Ironclad Board, of three senior naval officers to choose among the designs that were submitted for consideration. The three men were Captains Joseph Smith, Hiram Paulding, and Commander Charles Henry Davis. The board considered seventeen designs, and chose to support three. The first of the three to be completed, even though she was by far the most radical in design, was Swedish engineer and inventor John Ericsson's USS Monitor.

Ericsson's Monitor, which was built at Ericsson's yard on the East River in Greenpoint, Brooklyn, incorporated new and striking design features, the most significant of which were her armor and armament. Instead of the large numbers of guns of rather small bore that had characterized warships in the past, Ericsson opted for only two guns of large caliber; he wanted to use 15 in (380 mm) guns, but had to settle for 11 in (280 mm) Dahlgren guns when the larger size were unavailable. These were mounted in a cylindrical turret, 20 ft (6.1 m) in diameter, 9 ft (2.7 m) high, covered with iron 8 in (200 mm) thick. The whole rotated on a central spindle, and was moved by a steam engine that could be controlled by one man. Ericsson was afraid that using the full 30 pounds of black powder to fire the huge cannon would raise the risk of an explosion in the turret. He demanded that a charge of 15 pounds be used to lessen this possibility.

As with Virginia, trials found that a full charge would pierce armor plate, a finding that would have affected the outcome of the battle. A serious flaw in the design was the pilot house from which the ship would be conned, a small structure forward of the turret on the main deck. Its presence meant that the guns could not fire directly forward, and it was isolated from other activities on the ship. Despite the late start and the novelty of construction, Monitor was actually completed a few days before her counterpart Virginia, but the Confederates activated Virginia first.

== Battle ==
=== Command ===
The Confederate chain of command was anomalous. Lieutenant Catesby ap Roger Jones had directed much of the conversion of Merrimack to Virginia, and he was disappointed when he was not named her captain. Jones was retained aboard Virginia, but only as her executive officer. Ordinarily, the ship would have been led by a captain of the Confederate States Navy, to be determined by the rigid seniority system that was in place. Secretary Mallory wanted the aggressive Franklin Buchanan, but at least two other captains had greater seniority and had applied for the post. Mallory evaded the issue by appointing Buchanan, head of the Office of Orders and Detail, flag officer in charge of the defenses of Norfolk and the James River. As such, he could control the movements of Virginia. Technically, therefore, the ship went into the battle without a captain.

On the Union side, command of the North Atlantic Blockading Squadron was held by Flag Officer Louis M. Goldsborough. He had devised a plan for his frigates to engage Virginia, hoping to trap her in their crossfire. In the event, his plan broke down completely when four of the ships ran aground (one of them intentionally) in the confined waters of the roadstead. On the day of battle, Goldsborough was absent with the ships cooperating with the Burnside Expedition in North Carolina. In his absence, leadership fell to his second in command, Captain John Marston of USS Roanoke. As Roanoke was one of the ships that ran aground, Marston was unable to materially influence the battle, and his participation is often disregarded. Most accounts emphasize the contribution of the captain of Monitor, John L. Worden, to the neglect of others. Marston did, however, disregard orders from Secretary of War Gideon Welles to send the Monitor back to Washington, D.C., ahead of the battle, ensuring that it would be present to confront the Merrimack.

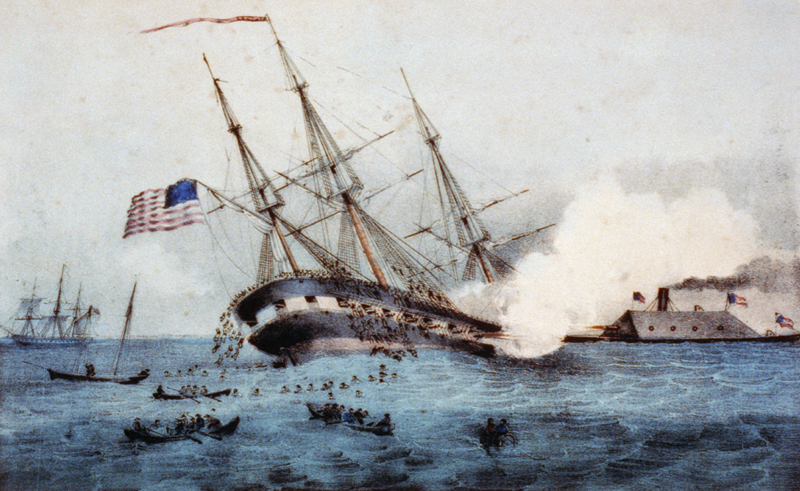
Sinking of Cumberland by the ironclad Virginia

=== March 8: Virginia wreaks havoc on wooden Union warships ===
The battle began when the large and unwieldy CSS Virginia steamed into Hampton Roads on the morning of March 8, 1862. Captain Buchanan intended to attack as soon as possible. Virginia was accompanied from her moorings on the Elizabeth River by Raleigh and Beaufort, and was joined at Hampton Roads by the James River Squadron, Patrick Henry, Jamestown, and Teaser. When they were passing the Union batteries at Newport News, Patrick Henry was temporarily disabled by a shot in her boiler that killed four of her crew. After repairs, she returned and rejoined the others.

At this time, the Union Navy had five warships in the roadstead, in addition to several support vessels. The sloop-of-war Cumberland and frigate Congress were anchored in the channel near Newport News. The sail frigate St. Lawrence and the steam frigates Roanoke and Minnesota were near Fort Monroe, along with the storeship Brandywine. The latter three got under way as soon as they saw Virginia approaching, but all soon ran aground. St. Lawrence and Roanoke took no further important part in the battle.

Virginia headed directly for the Union squadron. The battle opened when Union tug Zouave fired on the advancing enemy, and Beaufort replied. This preliminary skirmishing had no effect. Virginia did not open fire until she was within easy range of Cumberland. Return fire from Cumberland and Congress bounced off the iron plates without penetrating, although later some of Cumberland's gunfire lightly damaged Virginia.

Virginia rammed Cumberland below the waterline and she sank rapidly, "gallantly fighting her guns as long as they were above water," according to Buchanan. She took 121 seamen down with her; those wounded brought the casualty total to nearly 150.

Ramming Cumberland nearly resulted in the sinking of Virginia as well. Virginia's bow ram got stuck in the enemy ship's hull, and as Cumberland listed and began to go down, she almost pulled Virginia under with her. At the time the vessels were locked, one of Cumberland's anchors was hanging directly above the foredeck of Virginia. Had it come loose, the two ships might have gone down together. Virginia broke free, however, her ram breaking off as she backed away.

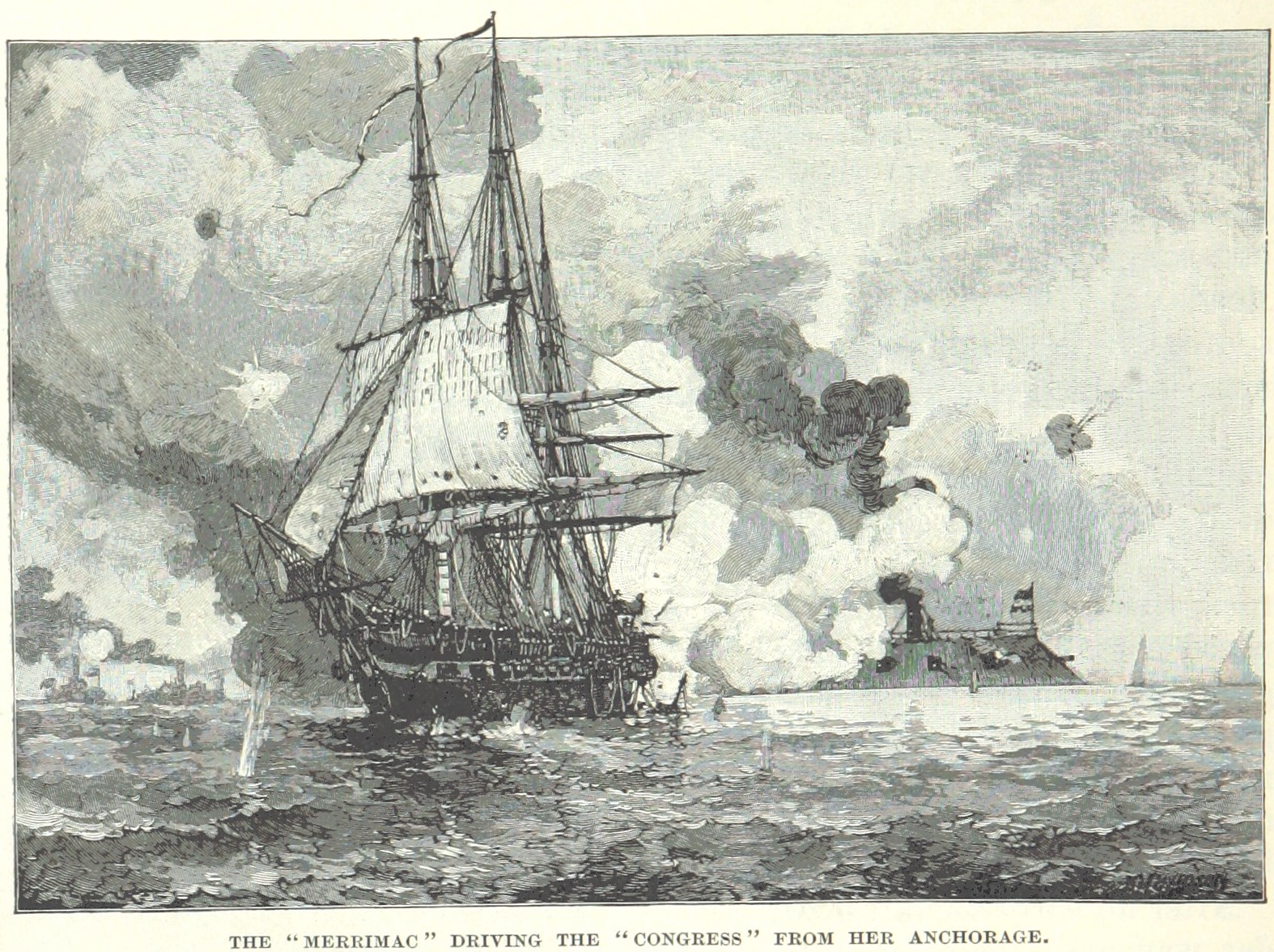
Virginia drives Congress away from her anchorage

Buchanan next turned Virginia on Congress. Seeing what had happened to Cumberland, Lieutenant Joseph B. Smith, captain of Congress, ordered his ship grounded in shallow water. By this time, the James River Squadron, commanded by John Randolph Tucker, had arrived and joined Virginia in the attack on Congress. After an hour of unequal combat, the badly damaged Congress surrendered. While the surviving crewmen of Congress were being ferried off the ship, a Union battery on the north shore opened fire on Virginia. In retaliation, Buchanan ordered Congress fired upon with hot shot, cannonballs heated red-hot. Congress caught fire and burned throughout the rest of the day. Near midnight, the flames reached her magazine and she exploded and sank, stern first. Personnel losses included 110 killed or missing and presumed drowned. Another 26 were wounded, of whom ten died within days.

Although she had not suffered anything like the damage she had inflicted, Virginia was not completely unscathed. Shots from Cumberland, Congress, and Union troops ashore had riddled her smokestack, reducing her already low speed. Two of her guns were disabled and several armor plates had been loosened. Two of her crew were killed, and more were wounded. One of the wounded was Captain Buchanan, who stood out into the open top of the Virginia, thinking it was perfectly safe, which led to him having his left thigh pierced by a rifle shot.

Meanwhile, the James River Squadron had turned its attention to Minnesota, which had left Fort Monroe to join in the battle and had run aground. After Virginia had dealt with the surrender of Congress, she joined the James River Squadron despite her damage. Because of her deep draft and the falling tide, however, Virginia was unable to get close enough to be effective, and darkness prevented the rest of the squadron from aiming their guns to any effect. The attack was therefore suspended. Virginia left with the expectation of returning the next day and completing the task. She retreated into the safety of Confederate-controlled waters off Sewell's Point for the night, but had killed 250 enemy sailors and had lost two. The Union had lost two ships and three were aground.

The United States Navy's greatest defeat (which would remain so until World War II) caused panic in Washington. As Lincoln's Cabinet met to discuss the disaster, the frightened Secretary of War Edwin Stanton told the others that Virginia might attack East coast cities, and even shell the White House before the meeting ended. Welles assured his colleagues that they were safe as the ship could not traverse the Potomac River. He added that the Union also had an ironclad, and that it was heading to meet Virginia.

=== March 9: Monitor engages Virginia ===
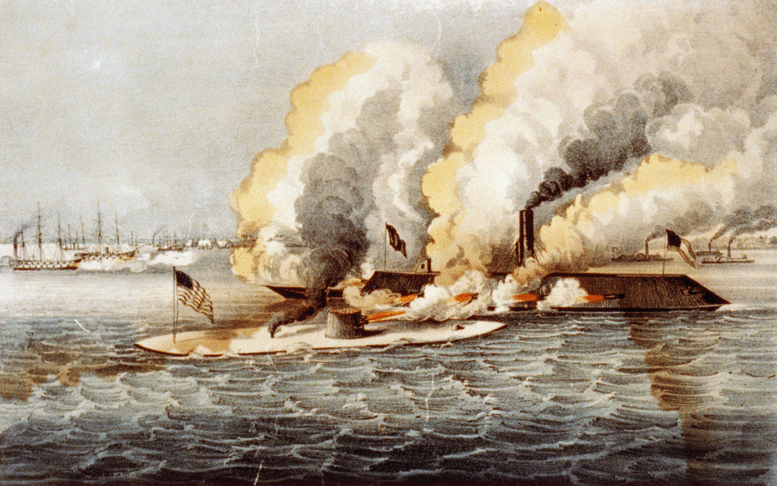
Ironclads engaged in terrific combat by Currier and Ives

Both sides used the respite to prepare for the next day. Virginia put her wounded ashore and underwent temporary repairs. Captain Buchanan was among the wounded, so command on the second day fell to his executive officer, Lieutenant Catesby ap Roger Jones. Jones proved to be no less aggressive than the man he replaced. While Virginia was being prepared for renewal of the battle, and while Congress was still ablaze, Monitor, commanded by Lieutenant John L. Worden, arrived in Hampton Roads. The Union ironclad had been rushed to Hampton Roads in hopes of protecting the Union fleet and preventing Virginia from threatening Union cities. Captain Worden was informed that his primary task was to protect Minnesota, so Monitor took up a position near the grounded Minnesota and waited. "All on board felt we had a friend that would stand by us in our hour of trial," wrote Captain Gershom Jacques Van Brunt, Minnesota's commander, in his official report the day after the engagement.

The next morning, at dawn on March 9, 1862, Virginia left her anchorage at Sewell's Point and moved to attack Minnesota, still aground. She was followed by the three ships of the James River Squadron. They found their course blocked, however, by the newly arrived Monitor. At first, Jones believed the strange craft—which one Confederate sailor mocked as "a cheese on a raft"—to be a boiler being towed from the Minnesota, not realizing the nature of his opponent. Soon, however, it was apparent that he had no choice but to fight her. The first shot of the engagement was fired at Monitor by Virginia. The shot flew past Monitor and struck Minnesota, which answered with a broadside; this began what would be a lengthy engagement. "Again, all hands were called to quarters, and when she approached within a mile of us I opened upon her with my stern guns and made a signal to the Monitor to attack the enemy," Van Brunt added.

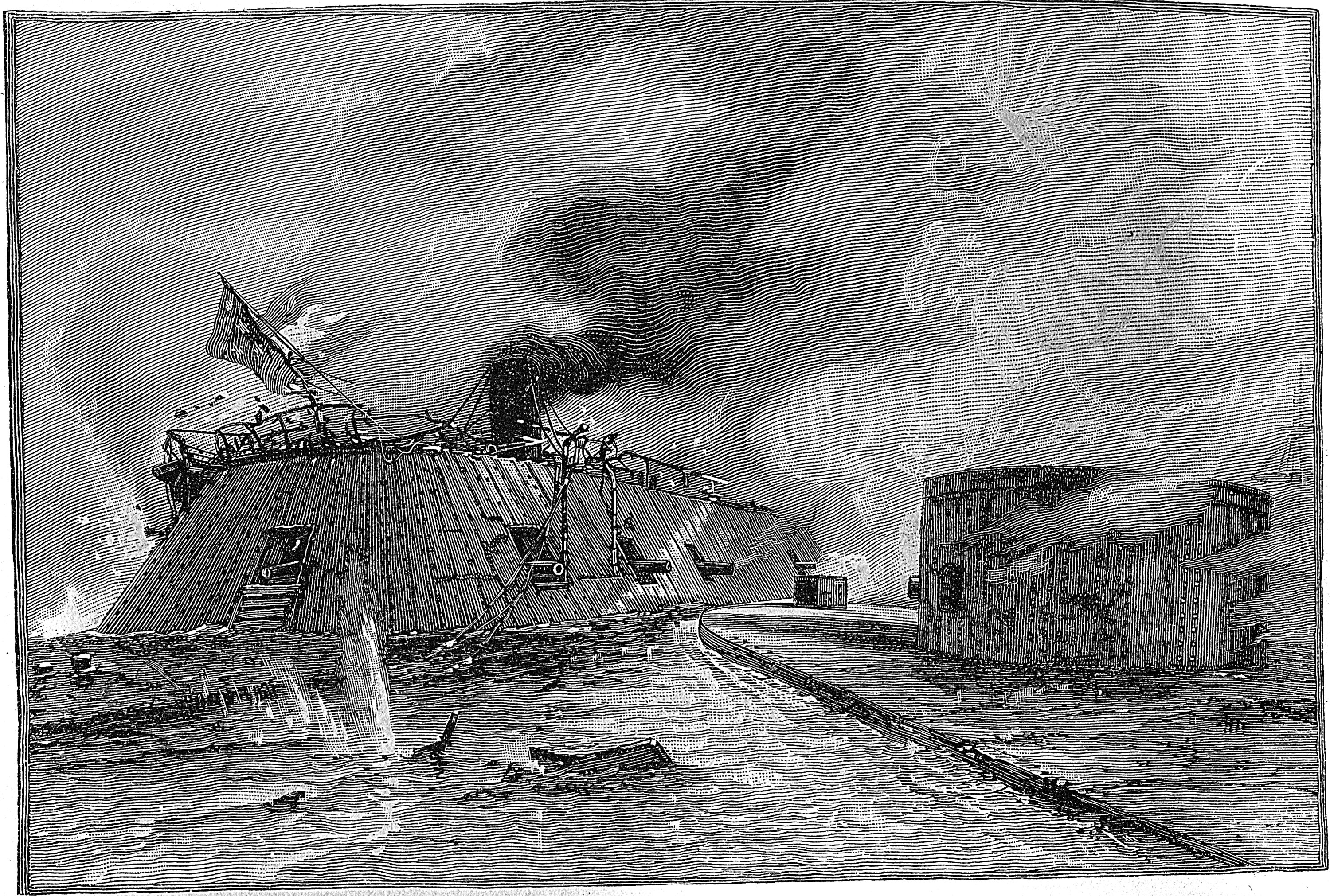
The heart of battle, from an 1871 wood engraving published by A.S. Barnes & Co.

After fighting for hours, mostly at close range, neither could overcome the other. The armor of both ships proved adequate. In part, this was because each was handicapped in her offensive capabilities. Buchanan, in Virginia, had not expected to fight another armored vessel, so his guns were supplied only with shell rather than armor-piercing shot. Monitor's guns were used with the standard service charge of only 15 lb (6.8 kg) of powder, which did not give the projectile sufficient momentum to penetrate her opponent's armor. Tests conducted after the battle showed that the Dahlgren guns could be operated safely and efficiently with charges of as much as 30 lb (14 kg). However, despite this, as the two ironclads circled each other during the fight, Monitor was about to penetrate Virginia's armor, but a misfiring of her weapons caused her to lose the advantage. At 10 AM that morning, Virginia grounded. Monitor opened fire on her vulnerable adversary, yet Virginia was able to scrape off the shore and rejoin the fight.

Later during the battle, Acting Master Louis N. Stodder and officers Stimers and Truscott were inside the gun turret, discussing the course of action. Stodder was leaning against the turret's inside wall when it took a direct hit. Stodder was knocked unconscious and taken below, where it took him an hour to regain consciousness. Stodder thus became the first man injured during the battle. He was replaced by Stimers.

The battle finally ceased when a shell from Virginia struck the pilot house of Monitor and exploded, driving fragments of paint and iron through the viewing slits into Worden's eyes and temporarily blinding him. As no one else could see to command the ship, Monitor was forced to draw off. The executive officer, Lieutenant Samuel Dana Greene, took over, and Monitor returned to the fight. In the period of command confusion, however, the crew of Virginia believed that their opponent had withdrawn. Although Minnesota was still aground, the falling tide meant that she was out of reach. Furthermore, Virginia had suffered enough damage to require extensive repair. Convinced that his ship had won the day, Jones ordered her back to Norfolk. At about this time, Monitor returned, only to discover her opponent apparently giving up the fight. Convinced that Virginia was quitting, with orders only to protect Minnesota and not to risk his ship unnecessarily, Greene did not pursue. Thus, each side misinterpreted the moves of the other, and as a result each claimed victory.

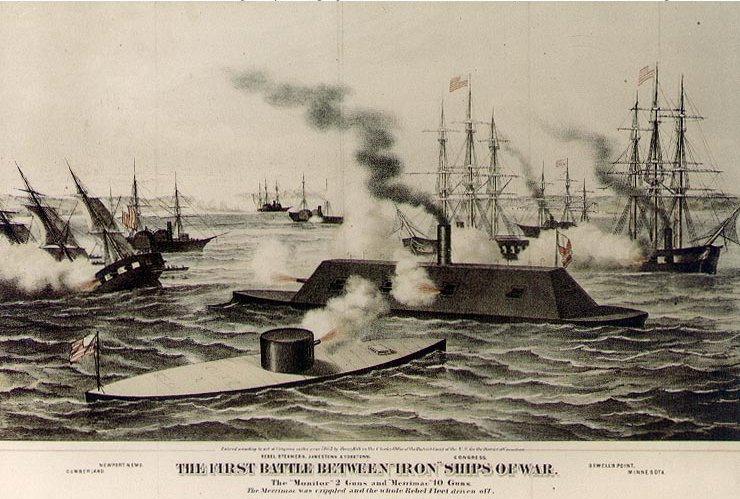
First Battle of Iron Ships of War by Henry Bill. Shown are USS Monitor, CSS Virginia, USS Cumberland, CSS Jamestown, USS Congress, and USS Minnesota

Confederate Secretary of the Navy Stephen Mallory wrote to Confederate President Davis of the action:

The conduct of the Officers and men of the squadron ... reflects unfading honor upon themselves and upon the Navy. The report will be read with deep interest, and its details will not fail to rouse the ardor and nerve the arms of our gallant seamen. It will be remembered that the Virginia was a novelty in naval architecture, wholly unlike any ship that ever floated; that her heaviest guns were equal novelties in ordnance; that her motive power and obedience to her helm were untried, and her officers and crew strangers, comparatively, to the ship and to each other; and yet, under all these disadvantages, the dashing courage and consummate professional ability of Flag Officer Buchanan and his associates achieved the most remarkable victory which naval annals record.

In Washington, belief that Monitor had vanquished Virginia was so strong that Worden and his men were awarded the thanks of Congress:

Resolved ... That the thanks of Congress and the American people are due and are hereby tendered to Lieutenant J. L. Worden, of the United States Navy, and to the officers and men of the ironclad gunboat Monitor, under his command, for the skill and gallantry exhibited by them in the remarkable battle between the Monitor and the rebel ironclad steamer Merrimack.

During the two-day engagement, USS Minnesota shot off 78 rounds of 10-inch solid shot; 67 rounds of 10-inch shells with 15-second fuse; 169 rounds of 9-inch solid shot; 180 9-inch shells with 15-second fuse; 35 8-inch shells with 15-second fuse and 5,567.5 pounds of service powder. Three crew members, Alexander Winslow, Henry Smith and Dennis Harrington were killed during the battle and 16 were wounded. One of Monitor's crew, Quartermaster Peter Williams, was awarded the Medal of Honor for his actions during the battle.

=== Spring 1862—a standoff at Hampton Roads ===
Virginia remained in drydock for almost a month, getting repairs for battle damage as well as minor modifications to improve her performance. On April 4, she was able to leave drydock. Buchanan, still recovering from his wound, had hoped that Catesby Jones would be picked to succeed him, and most observers believed that Jones's performance during the battle was outstanding. The seniority system for promotion in the Navy scuttled his chances, however, and the post went to the 67-year-old Commodore Josiah Tattnall III. Monitor, not severely damaged, remained on duty. Like his antagonist Jones, Greene was deemed too young to remain as captain; the day after the battle, he was replaced with Lieutenant Thomas Oliver Selfridge Jr. Two days later, Selfridge was in turn relieved by Lieutenant William Nicholson Jeffers.

By late March, the Union blockade fleet had been augmented by hastily refitted civilian ships, including the powerful SS Vanderbilt, SS Arago, SS Illinois, and SS Ericsson. These had been outfitted with rams and some iron plating. By late April, the new ironclads USRC E. A. Stevens and USS Galena had also joined the blockade.

Each side considered how best to eliminate the threat posed by its opponent, and after Virginia returned each side tried to goad the other into attacking under unfavorable circumstances. Both captains declined the opportunity to fight in waters not of their own choosing; Jeffers in particular was under positive orders not to risk his ship. Consequently, each vessel spent the next month in what amounted to posturing.

== Aftermath ==
=== Assessment ===
The victory claims that were made by both sides in the immediate aftermath of the Battle of Hampton Roads were based on misinterpretations of the opponent's behavior and have been dismissed by present-day historians. They agree that the result of the Monitor–Virginia encounter was not a victory for either side. As the combat between ironclads was the primary significance of the battle, the general verdict is that the overall result was a draw. All would acknowledge that the Southern fleet inflicted far more damage than it received, which would ordinarily imply that they had gained a tactical victory. Compared to other Civil War battles, the loss of men and ships for the Union Navy would be considered a clear defeat. On the other hand, the blockade was not seriously threatened, so the entire battle can be regarded as an assault that ultimately failed.

However, initially after the Battle of Hampton Roads, both the Confederate and Union media claimed victory for their own sides. A headline in a Boston newspaper the day after the battle read "The Merrimac Driven back by the Steamer!", implying a Union victory, while Confederate media focused on their original success against wooden Union ships. Despite the battle ending in a stalemate, it was seen by both sides as an opportunity to raise war-time morale, especially since the ironclad ships were an exciting naval innovation that intrigued citizens.

Evaluation of the strategic results is likewise disputed. The blockade was maintained, even strengthened, and Virginia was bottled up in Hampton Roads. Because a decisive Confederate weapon was negated, some have concluded that the Union could claim a strategic victory. Confederate advocates can counter, however, by arguing that Virginia had a military significance larger than the blockade, which was only a small part of the war in Tidewater Virginia. Her mere presence was sufficient to close the James River to Federal incursions. She also imposed other constraints on the Peninsula Campaign then being mounted by the Union Army under General George B. McClellan, who worried that she could interfere with his positions on the York River. Although his fears were baseless, they continued to affect the movements of his army until Virginia was destroyed.

=== Destruction of the combatants ===
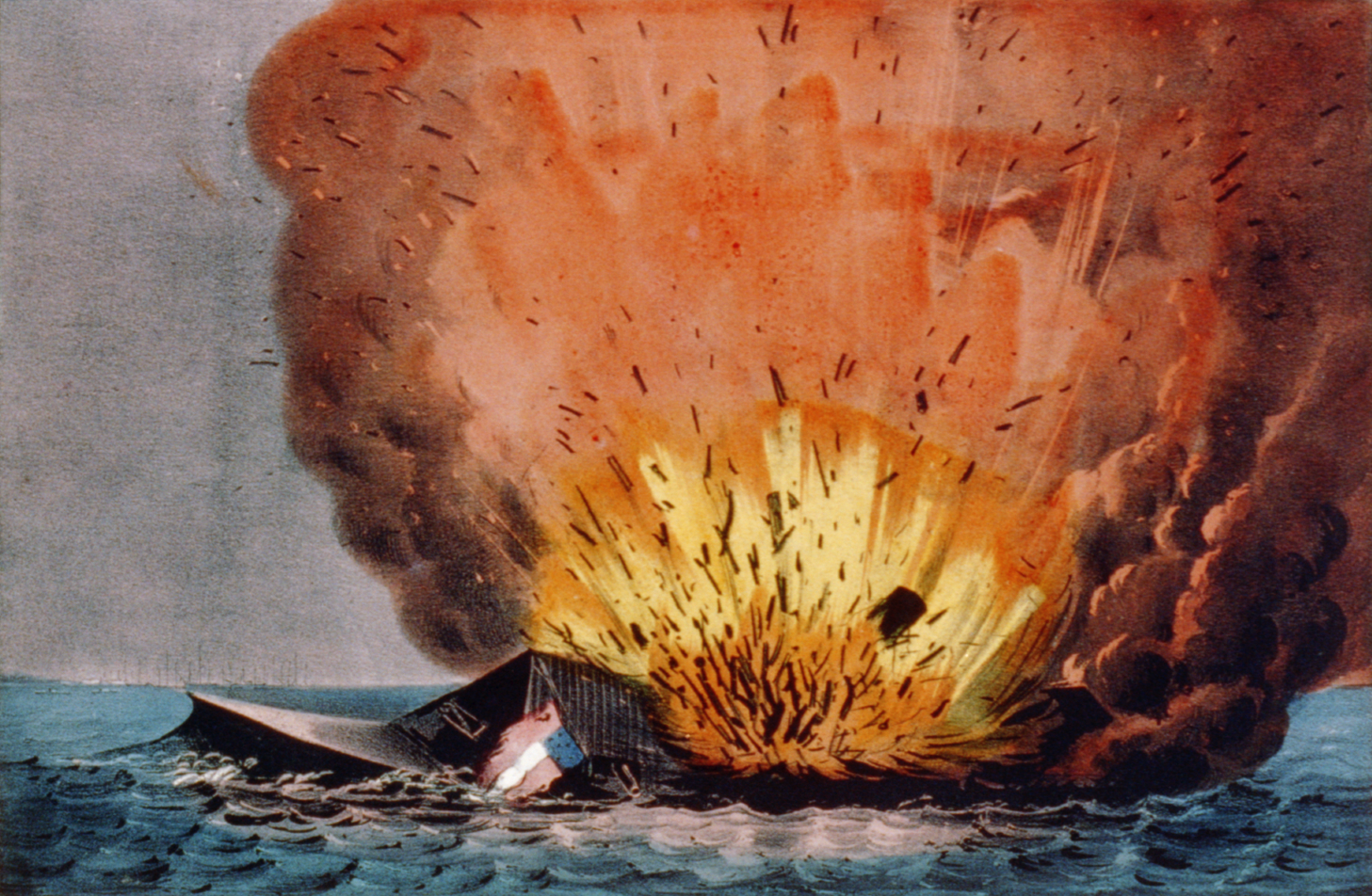
Destruction of the rebel monster Merrimac off Craney Island, May 11, 1862, by Currier and Ives

The end came first for Virginia. Because the blockade was unbroken, Norfolk was of little strategic use to the Confederacy, and preliminary plans were laid to move the ship up the James River to the vicinity of Richmond. Before adequate preparations could be made, the Confederate Army under Major General Benjamin Huger abandoned the city on May 9, without consulting anyone from the Navy. Virginia's draft was too great to permit her to pass up the river, which had a depth of only 18 ft (5.5 m), and then only under favorable circumstances. She was trapped and could only be captured or sunk by the Union Navy. Rather than allow either, Tattnall decided to destroy his own ship. He had her towed down to Craney Island in Portsmouth, where the gang were taken ashore, and then she was set afire. She burned through the rest of the day and most of the following night; shortly before dawn, the flames reached her magazine, and she blew up.

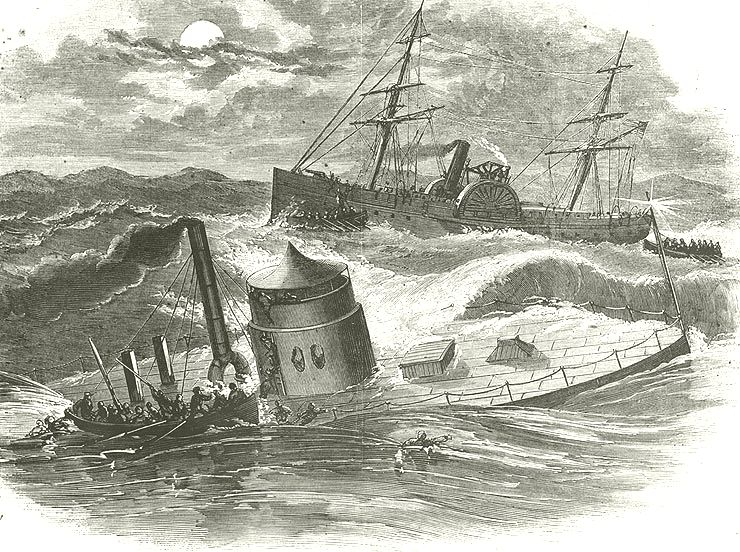
Engraving of Monitor sinking

Monitor likewise did not survive the year. She was ordered to Beaufort, North Carolina, on Christmas Day, to take part in the blockade there. While she was being towed down the coast (under command of her fourth captain, Commander John P. Bankhead), the wind increased and with it the waves; with no high sides, the Monitor took on water. Soon the water in the hold gained on the pumps, and then put out the fires in her engines. The order was given to abandon ship; most men aboard were rescued by USS Rhode Island, but 16 went down with her when she sank in the early hours of December 31, 1862.

== Impact upon naval warfare ==
Both days of the battle attracted attention from almost all the world's navies. USS Monitor became the prototype for the monitor warship type. She thus became the first of two ships whose names were applied to entire classes of their successors, the other being HMS Dreadnought. Many more were built, including river monitors, and they played key roles in Civil War battles on the Mississippi and James rivers.

The US immediately started the construction of ten more monitors based on Ericsson's original larger plan, known as the Passaic-class monitors. More than 20 additional monitors were built by the Union by the end of the war. However, while the design proved exceptionally well-suited for river combat, the low profile and heavy turret caused poor seaworthiness in rough waters. Russia, fearing that the American Civil War would spill into Russian Alaska, launched ten sister ships, as soon as Ericsson's plans reached St. Petersburg. What followed has been described as "Monitor mania". The revolving turret later inspired similar designs for future warships, which eventually became the modern battleship.

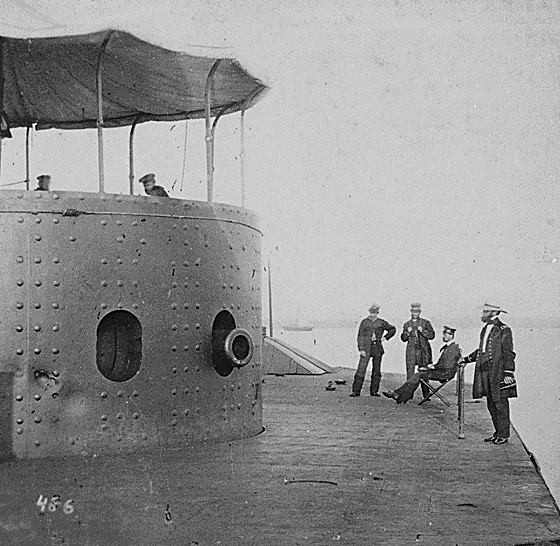
Stereograph of Monitor after the battle, July 1862

The vulnerability of wooden hulls to armored ships was noted particularly in Britain and France, where the wisdom of the planned conversion of the battle fleet to armor was given a powerful demonstration. Another feature that was emulated was not so successful. Impressed by the ease with which Virginia had sunk Cumberland, naval architects began to incorporate rams into their hull designs.

The first purpose-built ram in the modern era was the French armored ram Taureau, whose guns were said to have "the sole function of preparing the way for the ram." The inclusion of rams in warship hull design persisted almost to the outbreak of World War I.

== Commemorating the battle: Virginia ==
The name of the warship that served the Confederacy in the Battle of Hampton Roads has been a continuing source of confusion and some contention. She was originally a screw frigate in the United States Navy carrying the name USS Merrimack. All parties continued to use the name after her capture by secessionists while she was being rebuilt as an ironclad. When her conversion was almost complete, her name was officially changed to Virginia. Despite the official name change, Union accounts persisted in calling Merrimack by her original name, while Confederate sources used either Virginia or Merrimac(k). The alliteration of Monitor and Merrimack has persuaded most popular accounts to adopt the familiar name, even when it is acknowledged to be technically incorrect.

A CSS Merrimac did actually exist. She was a paddle wheel steamer named for the victor (as most Southerners saw it) at Hampton Roads. She was used for running the blockade until she was captured and taken into Federal service, still named Merrimac. Her name was a spelling variant of the river, namesake of USS Merrimack. Both spellings are still in use around the Hampton Roads area.

A small community in Montgomery County, Virginia, near the location where the iron for the Confederate ironclad was forged is now known as Merrimac. Some of the iron mined there and used in the plating on the Confederate ironclad is displayed at the Norfolk Naval Shipyard in Portsmouth. The anchor of Virginia sits on the lawn in front of the American Civil War Museum in Richmond.

== Commemorating the battle: Monitor ==
After resting undetected on the ocean floor for 111 years, the wreck of Monitor was located by a team of scientists in 1973. The remains of the ship were found upside down 16 mi (26 km) off Cape Hatteras, on a relatively flat, sandy bottom at a depth of about 240 ft (73 m). In 1987, the site was declared a National Marine Sanctuary, the first shipwreck to receive this distinction.

Because of Monitor's advanced state of deterioration, timely recovery of remaining significant artifacts and ship components became critical. Numerous fragile artifacts, including the innovative turret and its two Dahlgren guns, an anchor, steam engine, and propeller, have been recovered. They were transported back to Hampton Roads to the Mariners' Museum in Newport News, Virginia, where they were treated in special tanks to stabilize the metal. It was reported that it would take about ten years for the metal to completely stabilize. The new USS Monitor Center at the Mariners' Museum officially opened on March 9, 2007, and a full-scale copy of USS Monitor, the original recovered turret, and artifacts and related items are now on display.

== Commemorating the Battle of Hampton Roads ==
The Battle of Hampton Roads was a significant event in both Naval and Civil War history that has been detailed in many books, televised Civil War documentaries, and in film, to include TNT's 1991 Ironclads. In New York City, where the designer of the Monitor, John Ericsson, died in March 1889, a statue was commissioned by the state to commemorate the battle between the Ironclads. The statue features a stylized male nude allegorical figure on water between two iron cleats. It is located in Msgr McGolrick Park.

In Virginia, the state dedicated the Monitor-Merrimack Overlook at Anderson Park on a jetty that overlooks the site of the battle. The park contains several historical markers commemorating both ships. Also, in 1992, Virginia dedicated the $400 million, 4.6-mile-long Monitor-Merrimac Memorial Bridge-Tunnel, which is located less than 1 mile from the site of the battle.

== References in popular culture ==
- The film Hearts in Bondage (Republic Pictures, 1936), directed by Lew Ayres, tells the story of the building of USS Monitor and the following Battle of Hampton Roads.
- A 1991 made-for-television movie called Ironclads, produced by TNT, was made about the battle.
- The album The Monitor, the second studio album by New Jersey band Titus Andronicus, ends with a fourteen-minute track that references the battle.
- In Canyonlands National Park, Utah, there are two buttes named after Monitor and Merrimac. There is a viewpoint with a placard describing the significance of their names.
- Sleater-Kinney recorded an indie rock song referencing the battle, "Ironclad," on the album All Hands on the Bad One in 2000.
- The book The Virginia by Winston Brady, based on the Battle of Hampton Roads, depicts Captain(s) Franklin Buchanan and John Worden as tragic heroes who are injured during the battle as a punishment for their over-confidence created by the powerful, nigh-indestructible ships they commanded.
- In the novel The Claw of the Conciliator by Gene Wolfe, set in the Earth's future, the narrator tells a story from a book of myths that conflates the battle with the legend of Theseus and the Minotaur.
- In the film Sahara, CSS Texas, a later Columbia-class ironclad, is used as a plot device. Two recreations of Texas were constructed for the film: a scale shooting model and full-sized exterior and interior sets. Their outer appearances did not correspond with what is known about the historical ironclad; instead, Texas is represented on screen as an amalgam of the original CSS Virginia and Porter's original casemate ironclad (co-)design, which he based on his two 150 ft. and 180 ft. standard designs. The Columbia class was a variant of the latter and CSS Tennessee. Both were built with larger and differently shaped casemates.
- The album The Navy Blues (French: Les Bleus de la marine), published in 1975 in French and 2009 in English, of the Belgian series of comic books The Bluecoats (French: Les Tuniques Bleues), depicts the battle.

== See also ==
- List of United States Navy ships
- List of ships of the Confederate States Navy
- Bibliography of American Civil War naval history
- Union Navy
- Confederate States Navy

== Notes ==
Abbreviations used in these notes:

ORA (Official records, armies): War of the Rebellion: a compilation of the official records of the Union and Confederate Armies.
ORN (Official records, navies): Official records of the Union and Confederate Navies in the War of the Rebellion.
