= Someday Everything Will Be Fine =

Studio album by Spider Bags
- Released: August 3, 2018
- Recorded: June 2017 – January 2018
- Studio: Bunker Audio, Memphis, Tennessee
- Genre: Garage rock; indie rock
- Length: 38:35
- Label: Merge

Spider Bags chronology
Frozen Letter (2014)	Someday Everything Will Be Fine (2018)

Professional ratings
Aggregate scores
Source	Rating
AnyDecentMusic?	7.2/10
Metacritic	81/100
Review scores
Source	Rating
AllMusic	4/5 stars
Blurt	5/5 stars
Exclaim!	8/10
The Guardian	4/5 stars
Pitchfork	7/10

Someday Everything Will Be Fine is the fifth studio album by American alternative rock band Spider Bags. It was released on August 3, 2018, by Merge Records.

== Production ==
The album was recorded at Bunker Audio in Memphis, Tennessee, with producer Andrew McCalla, and features collaborations with Jack Oblivian, John Whittemore, Jana Misener, Krista Wroten-Combest, Patrick Stickles and Matthew Hoopengardner.

== Release ==
On June 20, 2018, Spider Bags announced the release of their fifth studio album, along with the single "Cop Dream/Black Eye".

On July 30, 2018, the music video to "Oxcart Blues" was released, with director Malachi Cull.

== Critical reception ==
Someday Everything Will Be Fine was met with "universal acclaim" reviews from critics. At Metacritic, which assigns a weighted average rating out of 100 to reviews from mainstream publications, this release received an average score of 81 based on 7 reviews. Aggregator Album of the Year gave the release a 75 out of 100 based on a critical consensus of 6 reviews.

Mark Deming of AllMusic noted how the band sounded a "little less punk and a bit more rock" on the release, while explaining the album "is an object lesson in how maturity and progress don't have to be the enemies of snarky, passionate rock & roll, and this is music that satisfies on several levels at once." Barry Vitus from Blurt gave the release five out of five stars, explaining that it "injected a new, creative energy into the band. The chemistry imbued by the helping hands and producer were significant to the end product." Writer Michael Hann of The Guardian gave the album four out of five stars, noting "their fifth album sound more of-the-moment than the previous four, not least because its opening track, Reckless, perfectly embodies that heavy, heavy slacker sound."

== Track listing ==
Someday Everything Will Be Fine track listing
No.	Title	Writer(s)	Length
1.	"Reckless"	Dan McGee	5:34
2.	"Oxcart Blues"	Dan McGee	2:44
3.	"Alligator"	Joseph Plunket	2:37
4.	"Burning Sand"	Dan McGee	4:30
5.	"Cop Dream/Black Eye (True Story)"	Dan McGee	0:59
6.	"My Heart Is a Flame in Reverse"	Dan McGee	6:26
7.	"Tonight, I Walk on the Water"	Dan McGee	1:23
8.	"Ninety Day Dog"		4:09
9.	"Apocalypso"	Dan McGee	4:50
10.	"Rollin' with the Flow"	Jerry Hayes	5:23

== Personnel ==
Band members

- Dan McGee – guitar, vocals
- Steve Oliva – bass, backing vocals
- Gregg Levy – guitar
- Rock Forbes – drums

Additional musicians

- Jerry Hayes – backing vocals
- Joseph Plunket – backing vocals
- Patrick Stickles – backing vocals, guitar
- Seth Moody – clavinet
- Jack Oblivian – guitar
- Tahr McGee – piano
- Jana Misener – backing vocals, cello
- Matt Hoopengardner – backing vocals, guitar
- Krista Wroten-Combest – violin, backing vocals

Production

- Andrew McCalla – engineer, mixing, producer
- Wesley Wolfe – mastering, mixing
