= Peter Williams (Medal of Honor) =

- Born: c. 1831; Norway
- Allegiance: United States
- Branch: United States Navy
- Service years: 1862–1867
- Rank: Acting ensign
- Commands: USS Clematis
- Conflicts: American Civil War • Battle of Hampton Roads
- Awards: Medal of Honor

Peter Williams (born c. 1831, date of death unknown) was a Union Navy sailor in the American Civil War who received the U.S. military's highest decoration, the Medal of Honor. He earned the award for steering USS Monitor throughout the Battle of Hampton Roads, the first combat between ironclad warships in history.

== Biography ==
Born in 1831 in Norway, Williams immigrated to the United States and lived in California. He worked as a civilian sailor for nine years before joining the U.S. Navy in New York on January 27, 1862, for a three-year term of service. His enlistment papers record him as being 5 feet 4 inches tall with blue eyes, brown hair, and a "florid" complexion. Following brief assignments to USS Norfolk Packet and the receiving ship USS North Carolina, Williams was transferred to the newly built USS Monitor, the first ironclad warship of the Union Navy, by March 6, 1862. He served on Monitor as a seaman and quartermaster, a position responsible for navigation of the ship.

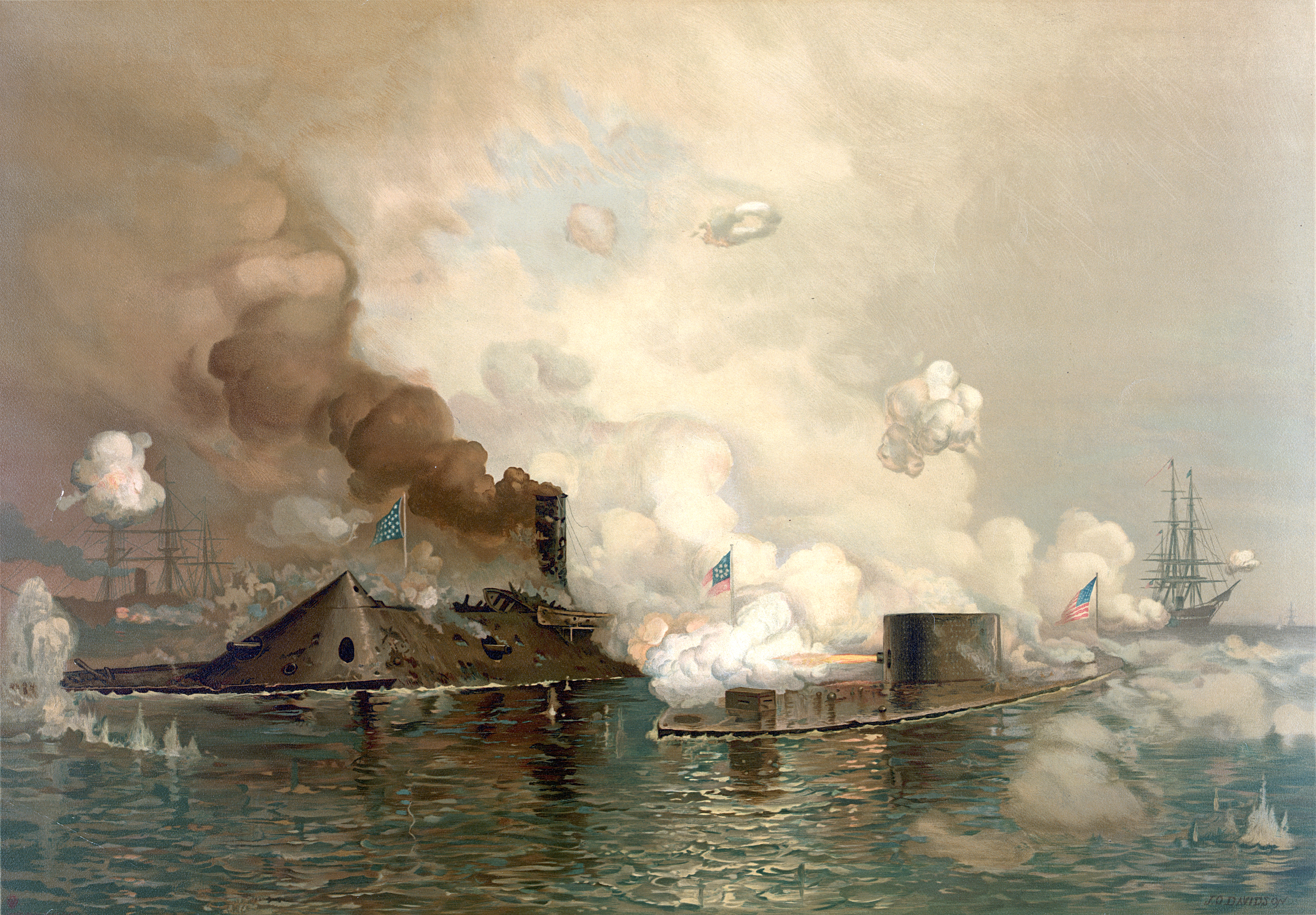
Depiction of the ironclads at the Battle of Hampton Roads, Monitor on the right

At the Battle of Hampton Roads on March 9, 1862, Williams stood at the ship's wheel and steered Monitor throughout an engagement with the Confederate ironclad CSS Virginia (formerly known as Merrimack). This battle represented the first meeting in combat of two ironclad warships. Williams was particularly noted for moving Monitor away from Virginia when the latter attempted to ram Monitor and again when Monitor's Captain John Lorimer Worden was wounded. Shipmate John Driscoll recalled of Williams: "Peter saw more of her [the Virginia] than anyone else. He say right into the bore of the gun ... Pete says, 'Captain, that is for us,' and rip! she came." For his actions during the battle, Williams was awarded the Medal of Honor a year later on April 3, 1863. He was the only person to receive the Medal of Honor for service on Monitor.

Weeks after the battle, Williams was promoted to mate (March 25) and then to master's mate (March 28) for his "heroic service" at Hampton Roads. On December 31, 1862, he survived the sinking of Monitor in rough seas. He and fellow quartermaster Richard Anjier were applauded by their captain, Commander John P. Bankhead, for showing "the highest quality of men and seamen" during the incident. Williams entered the commissioned officer ranks on January 10, 1863, with his assignment to USS Florida as an acting ensign, a position he held through the end of the war. In December 1865, he was placed in command of USS Clematis, a steam tugboat in the West Gulf Blockading Squadron. Williams was honorably discharged from the U.S. Navy on November 9, 1867, after nearly six years of service.

Williams is one of the hundreds of Medal of Honor recipients who are considered "lost to history", as his place of burial and other biographical details outside of his naval service are unknown.

== Medal of Honor citation ==
Williams's official Medal of Honor citation reads:

- Rank and organization: Seaman, U.S. Navy
- Accredited to: Pennsylvania
- G.O. No.: 11, 3 April 1863

Serving on board the U.S.S. Ironclad Steamer Monitor, Hampton Roads, 9 March 1862. During the engagement between the U.S.S. Monitor and the C.S.S. Merrimack, Williams gallantly served throughout the engagement as quartermaster, piloting the Monitor throughout the battle in which the Merrimack, after being damaged, retired from the scene of the battle.
