= John Marston (sailor) =

American naval officer (1795–1885)

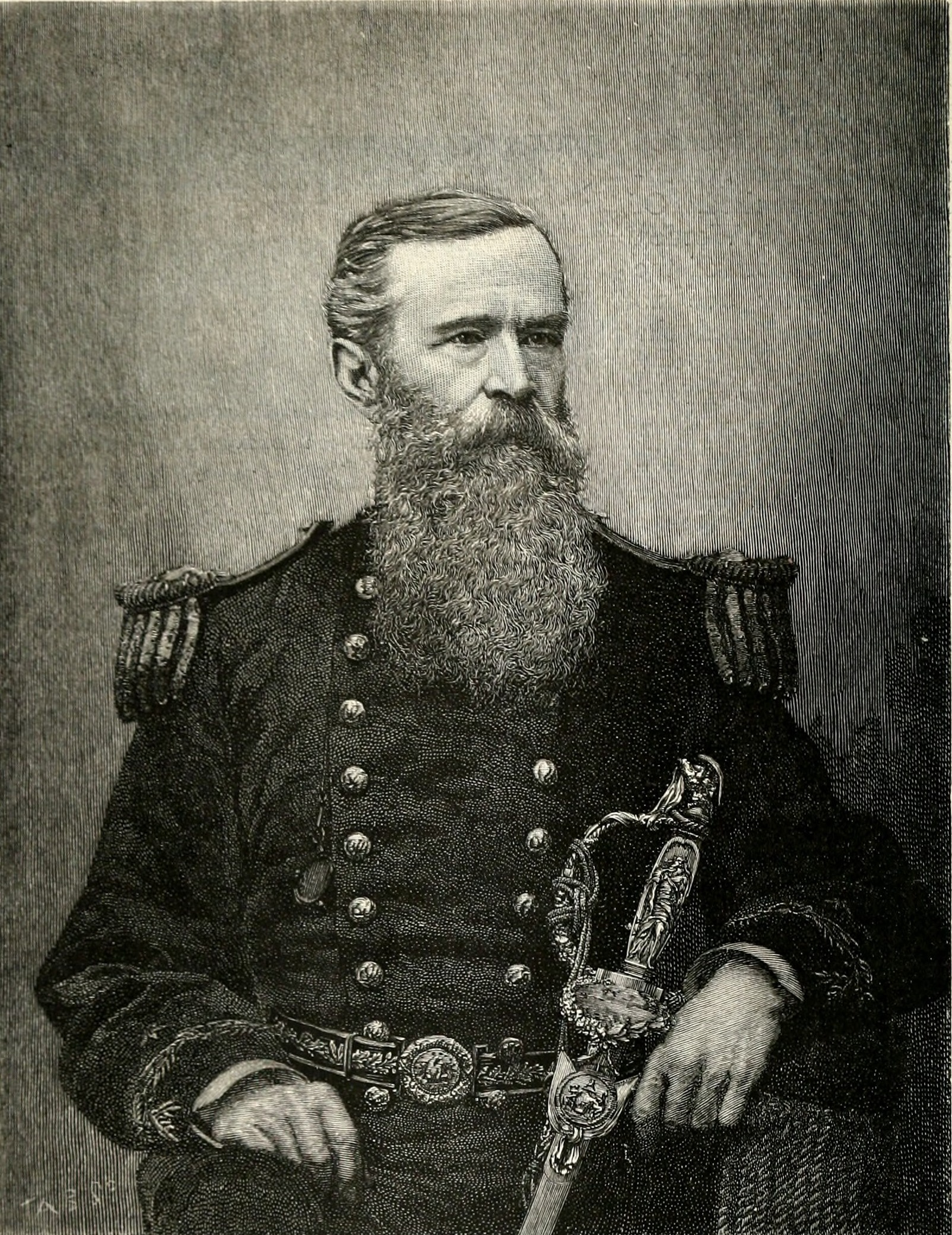
- Marston in 1875
- Born: June 12, 1795; Boston, Massachusetts
- Died: April 17, 1885 (aged 89); Philadelphia, Pennsylvania
- Military career
- Allegiance: United States of America; Union
- Branch: United States Navy; Union Navy
- Service years: 1813–1881
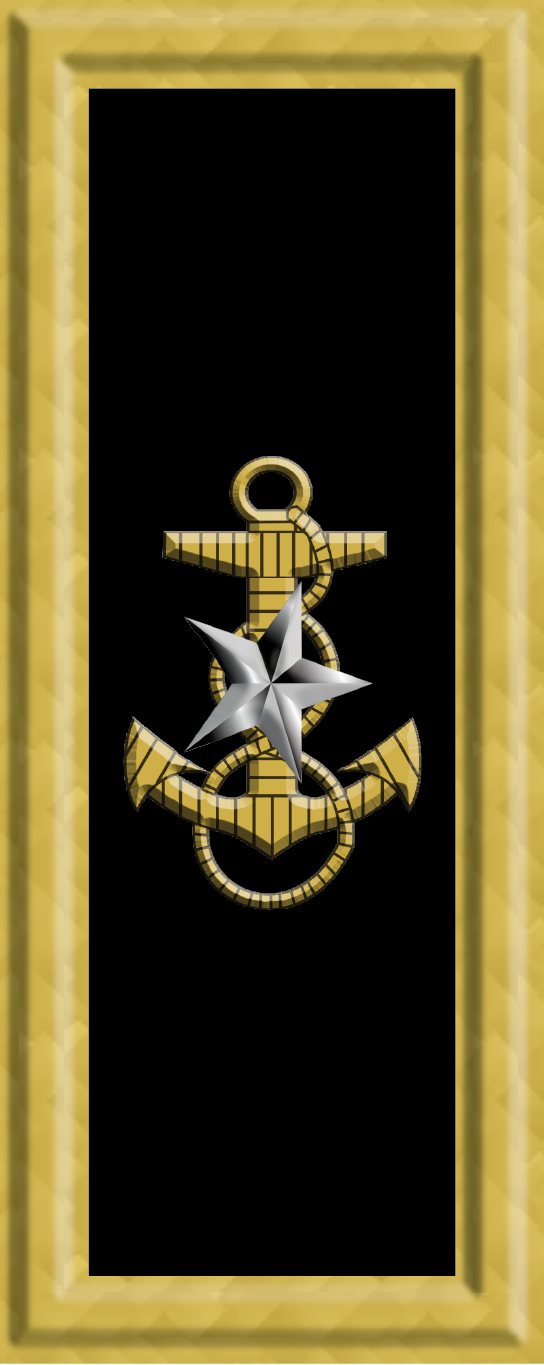
- Rank: Commodore
- Commands: USS Roanoke (1855)
- Conflicts: War of 1812; Mexican–American War American Civil War; Battle of Hampton Roads

Signature
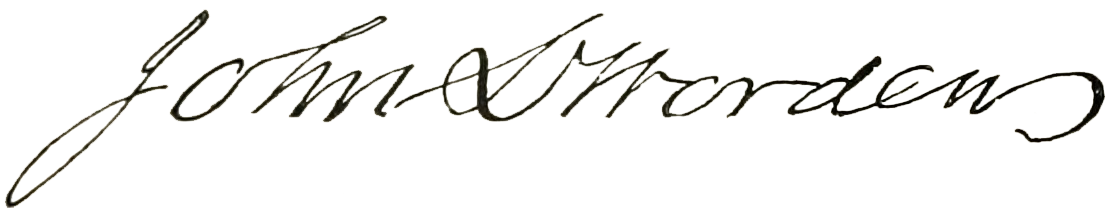

John Marston (June 12, 1795 – April 7, 1885) was an officer in the United States Navy, playing a small but pivotal role in the Battle of Hampton Roads, and eventually retiring as a rear admiral.

== Early career ==
Born in Boston, Massachusetts, he was the ninth child and eldest surviving son of Colonel John and Anna (Randall) Marston, and the third child of his parents to bear his father's name, two others dying in infancy. He was reared and educated in that city. During the War of 1812, Marston served as a messenger and carried the first news of Commander Isaac Hull's capture of HMS Guerriere to John Adams at Quincy, Massachusetts. The former president was impressed, and through his influence, Marston gained an appointment as midshipman, the warrant being dated April 15, 1813.

Marston saw some service during the War of 1812, and was later aboard USS Constitution when Lord Byron visited the famous frigate. In 1825 Marston was promoted to the grade of lieutenant, and was aboard USS Brandywine when she conveyed Marquis de Lafayette to France. From 1827 to 1829, Marston served in the Pacific squadron, and again in 1833 and 1834.

In 1840 he was assigned to the frigate USS United States, and in the following year was commissioned commander. In October 1850 he was assigned to the command USS Yorktown, on the coast of Africa, with the sailors under his command including a young William Harwar Parker. The ship ran aground in shallow waters later that year, and "Marston was tried by a court martial for the loss of his ship and honorably acquitted". Marston was in charge of the Philadelphia Naval Shipyard from 1853 until 1855, when he was promoted to captain.

== Civil War ==
Although placed on the retired list in December 1861, Marston was assigned to USS Cumberland, of the Brazil squadron, in which service he continued for a year, when he was commissioned commodore, July 16, 1862. Marston was in command of the frigate USS Roanoke at the Battle of Hampton Roads when CSS Merrimac destroyed USS Congress and USS Cumberland. Before the Monitor had arrived at Hampton Roads, Marston had received positive orders from Secretary of the War Department Gideon Welles to order that vessel to proceed at once to the defense of Washington, D.C., but "fearing the destruction of his entire fleet of wooden vessels by the terrible Merrimac, he disregarded his orders and ordered the Monitor to attack". He was described as "one of the most efficient officers of the United States navy during the Civil war".

== Later career ==
Marston was appointed inspector of lighthouses in the Boston district, from 1863 to 1866. For several years after the Civil War, he was in charge of the navy-yards at Portsmouth and Philadelphia, and of the naval station at Key West in 1867. In his many voyages, he served under Commodores John Rodgers, Isaac Hull, Matthew C. Perry, and Isaac Chauncey, of the old navy, and had seen altogether, before his retirement, half a century of active service. He was promoted to rear admiral while in retirement, in March 1881.

== Personal life ==
On November 2, 1830, Marston married Elizabeth (Bracket) Wilcox, widow of John Wilcox (1799-1827), of the well-known Wilcox family of Ivy Mills, Delaware county, Pennsylvania. They had five children.

Marston was a communicant of the Protestant Episcopal Church in the United States of America. His oldest son, Matthew R. Marston, entered the regular army, and was brevetted major for gallantry during the siege of Vicksburg.

Marston died at his home in Philadelphia on April 17, 1885, at the age of 89, after an illness of several weeks.
