= Spider Bags =

Alternative rock band from Chapel Hill, North Carolina

- Origin: Chapel Hill, North Carolina
- Genres: Alternative rock
- Years active: 2006–present
- Labels: Birdman; Odessa; Merge
- Members: Dan McGee; Gregg Levy; Rock Forbes; Steve Oliva
- Website: www.mergerecords.com/spider-bags

Spider Bags is an alternative rock band from Chapel Hill, North Carolina. The band was founded by Daniel McGee and Gregg Levy in 2006 after McGee's old band, the DC Snipers, broke up. Titus Andronicus frontman Patrick Stickles has described Spider Bags as "America’s most underrated band". Their debut album, A Celebration of Hunger, was recorded over a two-day period in February 2005 in Chapel Hill, and was released in 2007. The lineup on this album included not only McGee and Levy, but also a number of other musicians McGee knew from both North Carolina and New Jersey. Soon afterward, the New Jersey-born McGee moved to the Research Triangle area near Chapel Hill, and Levy followed suit shortly thereafter. The Spider Bags' lineup changed numerous times between the release of A Celebration of Hunger in 2007 and that its follow up, Goodbye Cruel World, Hello Crueler World, in 2009. Specifically, all the members other than McGee and Levy quit the band. For the band's third album, 2012's Shake My Head, the lineup included McGee and Levy, as well as Rock Forbes and Steve Oliva. Shortly after Shake My Head was released, Levy moved back to New Jersey, marking his departure from the band's lineup and reducing it to a trio. It was this trio that performed on the band's fourth album, Frozen Letter, which was released on Merge Records in 2014. Levy later rejoined the band for the recording of Someday Everything Will Be Fine, which was released in 2018.

== Discography ==
- A Celebration of Hunger (Birdman, 2007)
- Goodbye Cruel World, Hello Crueler World (Birdman, 2009)
- Shake My Head (Odessa, 2012)
- Frozen Letter (Merge, 2014)
- Someday Everything Will Be Fine (Merge, 2018)
