= The Will to Live =

The Will to Live may refer to:

- The Will to Live (Ben Harper album), 1997
- The Will to Live (Titus Andronicus album), 2022
