= A Productive Cough =

Studio album by Titus Andronicus
- Released: March 2, 2018
- Genres: Punk rock; Indie rock; Heartland rock
- Length: 46:43
- Label: Merge

Titus Andronicus chronology
The Most Lamentable Tragedy (2015)	A Productive Cough (2018)	An Obelisk (2019)

Singles from A Productive Cough
- 1. "Number One (In New York)" Released: January 4, 2018

Professional ratings
Aggregate scores
Source	Rating
AnyDecentMusic?	6.4/10
Metacritic	68/100
Review scores
Source	Rating
AllMusic	4/5 stars
The A.V. Club	B+
DIY	2/5 stars
Exclaim!	7/10
Paste	6.9/10
Pitchfork	5.9/10

A Productive Cough is the fifth studio album by New Jersey punk rock band Titus Andronicus, released on March 2, 2018, through Merge Records. The band's frontman, Patrick Stickles, indicated that the album is a departure from their earlier work insofar as it contains no "punk bangers" and offers "a mellower, more ballad-oriented approach" while also capturing the looseness of the band's live performances.

== Track listing ==
All tracks are written by Patrick Stickles, except "(I'm) Like a Rolling Stone" originally by Bob Dylan.

No.	Title	Length
1.	"Number One (In New York)"	8:13
2.	"Real Talk"	7:15
3.	"Above the Bodega (Local Business)"	4:46
4.	"Crass Tattoo"	4:21
5.	"(I'm) Like a Rolling Stone"	8:53
6.	"Home Alone"	8:17
7.	"Mass Transit Madness (Goin' Loco')"	4:58
Total length:		46:43

== Personnel ==
Titus Andronicus

- Patrick Stickles – lead vocals, electric guitar, harmonica, percussion, writer, director, editor
- Liam Betson – electric guitar
- Alexander Molini – piano, clavinet, CP-60 electric piano, Rhodes electric piano
- R.J. Gordon – bass guitar, vocals, additional engineer
- Chris Wilson – drums, bells, congas

Additional musicians

- Matt "Money" Miller – vocal on "Real Talk"
- Megg Farrell – lead vocals on "Crass Tattoo"
- Dan McGee – wah guitar
- Michael Gagliardi – alto saxophone
- Rhy Weisheit – tenor saxophone, bass saxophone, clarinet, bass clarinet
- Carter Yasutake – trumpet
- James Scarpantoni – cello
- Rick Steff – grand piano, Hammond B-3 organ, Wurlitzer electric piano
- Ian Dykstra – bells
- Kevin S. McMahon – vocals, percussion
- Cary Kehayan, Daniel Miller, Janelle Miller, Megg Farrell, Neve Parker, Sean Heaney, Stella McMahon – vocals

Production

- Kevin S. McMahon – producer, engineer, mixer
- Jeff Powell – additional engineer
- Wesley Graham – additional engineer
- Jamal Ruhe – mastering
- Daniel Murphy – design, layout
- Rosemary Miller – cover photographer
- Ray Concepcion – ethical advisor, interior photography

== Charts ==
Chart performance for A Productive Cough
Chart (2018)	Peak position
US Billboard 200	13
US Heatseekers Albums (Billboard)	2
US Independent Albums (Billboard)	13
US Top Album Sales (Billboard)	81
US Indie Store Album Sales (Billboard)	25
US Vinyl Albums (Billboard)	10
