= Local Business =

Studio album by Titus Andronicus
- Released: October 22, 2012
- Recorded: April – May 2012
- Genres: Punk rock; indie rock
- Length: 49:22
- Label: XL
- Producer: Kevin McMahon

Titus Andronicus chronology
The Monitor (2010)	Local Business (2012)	The Most Lamentable Tragedy (2015)

Professional ratings
Aggregate scores
Source	Rating
AnyDecentMusic?	7.3/10
Metacritic	78/100
Review scores
Source	Rating
AllMusic	4/5 stars
The Austin Chronicle	3.5/5 stars
The A.V. Club	B+
Consequence of Sound	4.0/5 stars
Paste	9.0/10
Pitchfork	7.0/10
PopMatters	6/10
Rolling Stone	4.0/5 stars
Slant Magazine	3/5 stars
Spin	7/10

Local Business is the third studio album by American punk/indie rock band Titus Andronicus. It was released on October 22, 2012, via XL. The first single, "In a Big City", was posted in the band's blog on September 19, 2012.

A more stripped down record than their previous efforts, Local Business was recorded live in the studio with almost no overdubs, creating an album that was "plug-in-and-play" ready, helping the band sound as close as possible to the album when playing live.

The album received positive reviews and was listed at #38 on Rolling Stone's list of the top 50 albums of 2012, saying "These Jersey boys might be America's most desperately ambitious, righteously exciting punk-rock flamethrowers."

== Track listing ==
All tracks are written by Patrick Stickles.

No.	Title	Length
1.	"Ecce Homo"	5:11
2.	"Still Life with Hot Deuce on Silver Platter"	5:30
3.	"Upon Viewing Oregon’s Landscape with the Flood of Detritus"	3:27
4.	"Food Fight!"	1:09
5.	"My Eating Disorder"	8:12
6.	"Titus Andronicus vs. The Absurd Universe (3rd Round KO)"	2:09
7.	"In a Big City"	3:35
8.	"In a Small Body"	6:11
9.	"(I Am the) Electric Man"	4:14
10.	"Tried to Quit Smoking"	9:44
Total length:		49:22

== Personnel ==
=== Titus Andronicus ===
- Patrick Stickles – lead vocals, guitar, glockenspiel
- Liam Betson – guitar
- Adam Reich – guitar, percussion, vocals, additional engineering, additional production
- Julian Veronesi – bass guitar, vocals
- Eric Harm – drums, percussion, vocals

=== Additional musicians ===
- Kevin McMahon – guitar, percussion, vocals
- Owen Pallett – violin
- Elio DeLuca – piano, electric piano
- Steve Harm – harmonica

=== Production ===
- Kevin McMahon – producer, recording, mixing
- Greg Calbi – mastering
- Nick Kita – live photo
- Nolen Strals – layout, all other photos
