= The Most Lamentable Tragedy =

Studio album by Titus Andronicus
- Released: July 28, 2015
- Recorded: Sept. 1, 2014 – Feb. 16, 2015
- Genre: Punk rock; indie rock
- Length: 92:36
- Label: Merge
- Producer: Kevin McMahon & Adam Reich

Titus Andronicus chronology
Local Business (2012)	The Most Lamentable Tragedy (2015)	A Productive Cough (2018)

The Most Lamentable Tragedy is the fourth studio album by New Jersey punk rock band Titus Andronicus, released on July 28, 2015, through Merge Records. It is a rock opera in five acts that follows "Our Hero", a man who is visited by his doppelganger and goes through considerable life experiences and dream sequences, all acting as a metaphor for bipolar disorder.

== Reception ==
Professional ratings
Aggregate scores
Source	Rating
AnyDecentMusic?	7.7/10
Metacritic	79/100
Review scores
Source	Rating
AllMusic	4/5 stars
Alternative Press	4/5 stars
The A.V. Club	B+
Exclaim!	9/10
The Guardian	3/5 stars
NME	7/10
Pitchfork	8.1/10
Rolling Stone	3.5/5 stars
Spin	8/10
Uncut	9/10

At Metacritic, which assigns a normalized rating out of 100 to reviews from music critics, TMLT has received an average score of 79, indicating "generally favorable reviews". Tiny Mix Tapes gave it a perfect 10/10, saying "TMLT feels like the Titus Andronicus record par excellence, it pushes and shoves at the boundaries of what such a record could or should conceivably sound like," while Pitchfork Media noted, "A 29-track, 93-minute rock opera that immediately restored their claims to outsized ambition, as only a 29-track, 93-minute rock opera might."

=== Accolades ===
Publication	Accolade	Year	Rank
Stereogum	The 50 Best Albums of 2015	2015	#17
American Songwriter	The 50 Best Albums of 2015	2015	#24
Consequence of Sound	The 50 Best Albums of 2015	2015	#9
Spin (magazine)	The 50 Best Albums of 2015	2015	#32

== Track listing ==
All tracks are written by Patrick Stickles and arranged by Titus Andronicus except "I Lost My Mind (DJ)" by Daniel Johnston, "A Pair of Brown Eyes" by Shane MacGowan, "Auld Lang Syne" (traditional), and "I'm Going Insane (Finish Him)" (traditional).

Disc One - Act I: Set Aside or Miserable and Water-Buried
No.	Title	Length
1.	"The Angry Hour"	1:42
2.	"No Future Part IV: No Future Triumphant"	4:53
3.	"Stranded (On My Own)"	4:24
4.	"Lonely Boy"	5:21
5.	"I Lost My Mind (+@ )"	4:18
6.	"Look Alive"	0:33

Disc One - Act II: Beside Himself
No.	Title	Length
7.	"The Magic Morning"	1:00
8.	"Lookalike"	0:48
9.	"I Lost My Mind (DJ)"	1:36
10.	"Mr. E. Mann"	3:49
11.	"Fired Up"	4:05
12.	"Dimed Out"	2:57
13.	"More Perfect Union"	9:39
14.	"[ intermission ]"	1:17

Disc Two - Act III: Down by the Seaside
No.	Title	Length
1.	"Sun Salutation"	0:55
2.	"(S)HE SAID / (S)HE SAID"	9:11
3.	"Funny Feeling"	3:24
4.	"Fatal Flaw"	3:27
5.	"Please"	1:14

Disc Two - Act IV: The Other Side or A Midsummer Night's Dream
No.	Title	Length
6.	"Come On, Siobhán"	3:43
7.	"A Pair of Brown Eyes"	3:16
8.	"Auld Lang Syne"	1:46
9.	"I'm Going Insane (Finish Him)"	1:58

Disc Two - Act V: Decide
No.	Title	Length
10.	"The Fall"	0:47
11.	"Into the Void (Filler)"	4:36
12.	"No Future Part V: In Endless Dreaming"	4:40
13.	"[ seven seconds ]"	0:07
14.	"Stable Boy"	6:52
15.	"A Moral"	0:30
Total length:		92:36

== Charts ==
Chart (2015)	Peak position
US Billboard 200	164

== Personnel ==
=== Titus Andronicus ===
- Patrick Stickles – lead vocals, guitar, electronics, chord organ, harmonica, glockenspiel
- Adam Reich – lead guitar, vocals, percussion, organ, mandolin, glockenspiel
- Jonah Maurer – guitar
- Julian Veronesi – bass guitar, vocals
- Eric Harm – drums, vocals

=== Additional musicians ===
- Ryan Weisheit – flute, clarinet, bass clarinet, tenor saxophone
- Owen Pallett – violin, viola
- Elio DeLuca – piano, organ, electric piano
- Yoni David – percussion
- Alex Levine, Carrie-Anne Murphy, Catherine Herrick, Matthew Miller, R.J. Gordon, Ryan Levine – vocals
