= The Will to Live (Titus Andronicus album) =

Studio album by Titus Andronicus
- Released: September 30, 2022
- Studio: Hotel2Tango, Montreal
- Length: 50:57
- Label: Merge
- Producer: Howard Bilerman and Patrick Stickles

Titus Andronicus chronology
An Obelisk (2019)	The Will to Live (2022)

Singles from The Will to Live
- 1. "(I’m) Screwed" Released: July 19, 2022; 2. "Give Me Grief" Released: August 10, 2022

Professional ratings
Aggregate scores
Source	Rating
Metacritic	75/100
Review scores
Source	Rating
Exclaim!	8/10
Pitchfork	7.5/10
Under the Radar	7/10 stars

The Will to Live is the seventh studio album by American indie rock band Titus Andronicus. It was released on September 30, 2022, by Merge Records.

The album is a dedication to former band member Matt Miller who had died in March 2021.

== Background ==
On July 19, 2022, Titus Andronicus announced the release of their seventh studio album, along with the first single "(I’m) Screwed". Speaking of the release of the album, lead singer Patrick Stickles said:

Certain recent challenges, some unique to myself and some we have all shared, but particularly the passing of my dearest friend, have forced me to recognise not only the precious and fragile nature of life, but also the interconnectivity of all life.

The second single "Give Me Grief" was released on August 10, 2022.

== Critical reception ==
The Will to Live was met with "generally favorable" reviews from critics. At Metacritic, which assigns a weighted average rating out of 100 to reviews from mainstream publications, this release received an average score of 75, based on 6 reviews.

== Track listing ==
No.	Title	Length
1.	"My Mother Is Going to Kill Me"	3:19
2.	"(I’m) Screwed"	4:18
3.	"I Can Not Be Satisfied"	5:14
4.	"Bridge and Tunnel"	7:10
5.	"Grey Goo"	1:30
6.	"Dead Meat"	3:21
7.	"An Anomaly"	7:02
8.	"Give Me Grief"	4:13
9.	"Baby Crazy"	4:15
10.	"All Through the Night"	4:38
11.	"We’re Coming Back"	3:13
12.	"69 Stones"	2:44

== Personnel ==
Titus Andronicus

- Patrick Stickles – lead vocals, electric guitar, synthesizer, sampler, harmonica, percussion, producer, additional engineering, field recordings
- Liam Betson – electric guitar, vocals; lead vocals (1)
- R.J. Gordon – bass guitar, vocals, additional engineering
- Chris Wilson – drums, percussion

Additional musicians

- Josée Caron – lead vocals (4), lead guitar (7)
- Eric Harm – vocals; lead vocals (8)
- Alex Jones, Danny Miller, Tim Kingsbury – vocals
- Tad Kubler – electric guitar (1, 10)
- Michael Carson – piano
- Jake Clemons – piano (12)
- Ryan Weisheit – saxophone
- Howard Bilerman – drum machine, brushed snare

Production

- Howard Bilerman – producer, mixing, interior photography
- Shae Brossard – engineer
- Matthew Barnhart – mastering
- Nicole Rifkin – artwork
- Daniel Murphy – interior layout
