= An Obelisk =

Studio album by Titus Andronicus
- Released: June 21, 2019
- Genre: Punk rock
- Length: 38:04
- Label: Merge
- Producer: Bob Mould

Titus Andronicus chronology
A Productive Cough (2018)	An Obelisk (2019)	The Will to Live (2022)

An Obelisk is the sixth studio album by Titus Andronicus, released on June 21, 2019, through Merge Records. The album was produced by Bob Mould and recorded at Steve Albini’s Electrical Audio studio, and it is also the band’s shortest album. The album's "louder, more aggressive style" received mostly positive reviews, including Consequence of Sound calling it "easily their most digestible and contained album yet".

== Track listing ==
No.	Title	Length
1.	"Just Like Ringing A Bell"	3:31
2.	"Troubleman Unlimited"	4:28
3.	"(I Blame) Society"	3:20
4.	"My Body and Me"	3:50
5.	"Hey Ma"	5:30
6.	"Beneath the Boot"	1:27
7.	"On the Street"	1:08
8.	"Within the Gravitron"	5:35
9.	"The Lion Inside"	4:27
10.	"Tumult Around the World"	5:08
Total length:		38:04

== Personnel ==
Titus Andronicus

- Patrick Stickles – lead vocals, electric guitar, additional engineering
- Liam Betson – electric guitar, vocals, additional engineering
- R.J. Gordon – bass guitar, vocals
- Chris Wilson – drum set, percussion

Additional musician

- Ralph Darden – vocals

Production

- Bob Mould – producer, mixing
- Beau Sorenson – engineer, mixing
- Jon San Paolo – studio assistant
- Matthew Barnhart – mastering
- Nolen Strals – artwork, design
