= The Airing of Grievances =

Studio album by Titus Andronicus
- Released: April 14, 2008
- Recorded: August – December 2007
- Studio: Marcata Recording (New Paltz, New York)
- Genre: Punk rock; indie rock; lo-fi; shoegazing; emo
- Length: 45:05
- Label: Troubleman Unlimited
- Producer: Kevin McMahon

Titus Andronicus chronology
The Airing of Grievances (2008)	The Monitor (2010)

Professional ratings
Aggregate scores
Source	Rating
Metacritic	85/100
Review scores
Source	Rating
AllMusic	3.5/5 stars
Alternative Press	4.5/5 stars
The A.V. Club	A−
Entertainment Weekly	A
The Guardian	4/5 stars
The Irish Times	4/5 stars
Pitchfork	8.5/10
Rolling Stone	3.5/5 stars
Spin	3.5/5 stars
Uncut	4/5 stars

The Airing of Grievances is the debut studio album by American punk rock band Titus Andronicus, released on the Troubleman Unlimited record label on April 14, 2008. The album combines elements of punk rock, shoegaze, and lo-fi music. It was reissued on January 20, 2009, on XL Recordings.

The album title is a reference to the Seinfeld episode "The Strike", where the "Airing of Grievances" is a practice observed during the fictional holiday of "Festivus".

== Track listing ==
All tracks are written by Patrick Stickles.

No.	Title	Length
1.	"Fear and Loathing in Mahwah, NJ"	5:56
2.	"My Time Outside the Womb"	2:55
3.	"Joset of Nazareth's Blues"	2:30
4.	"Arms Against Atrophy"	5:16
5.	"Upon Viewing Bruegel's "Landscape with the Fall of Icarus""	4:25
6.	"Titus Andronicus"	3:31
7.	"No Future Part I"	7:39
8.	"No Future Part II: The Day After No Future"	6:54
9.	"Albert Camus"	6:25

Notes

- "Fear and Loathing in Mahwah, NJ" contains a reading from The Most Lamentable Romaine Tragedy of Titus Andronicus by William Shakespeare.
- "Titus Andronicus" contains an interpolation of "You Can't Quit, You're Fired" by Roger Klotz.
- "No Future Part II: The Day After No Future" contains a reading from The Stranger by Albert Camus, translated from the French by Stuart Gilbert.

== Personnel ==
=== Titus Andronicus ===
- Patrick Stickles – lead vocals, guitar, synthesizer, piano, glockenspiel, tambourine
- Liam Betson – guitar, vocals, percussion
- Daniel Tews – guitar, vocals, percussion
- Ian Graetzer – bass guitar
- Ian Dykstra – drums

=== Additional musicians ===
- Kevin Kearns – vocals
- Sean Neafsey – vocals
- Andrew Cedermark – guitar
- Kevin McMahon – guitar, vocals
- Eliane Labate – saxophone
- Brian Nowakowski – trumpet
- Ava Tews – clarinet
- David Bently – cello
- Amy Klein – violin
- Elio Deluca – electric piano
- Susan Putnins – vocals, piano
- Sarim Al-Rawi – vocals, percussion
- Eric Harm – vocals, percussion
- Megan Stickles – baby noises

=== Production ===
- Kevin McMahon – producer, recording engineer
- Guy Davie – mastering
- Patrick Stickles – cover photo
- Dan Tews – photo
- Ian Graetzer – layout
- Ian O'Neil – typography
