= A More Perfect Union (song) =

Song by Titus Andronicus

from the album The Monitor
- Genre: Punk rock, indie rock
- Length: 7:10
- Label: XL Recordings
- Songwriter(s): Patrick Stickles
- Producer(s): Kevin McMahon

"A More Perfect Union" is a 2010 song by New Jersey–based punk rock band Titus Andronicus, the lead track from their second album, The Monitor. The song is 7 minutes and 10 seconds long, and begins with a recording of Abraham Lincoln's Lyceum address. The song ends with another spoken-word segment, taken from an article written by William Lloyd Garrison in the first issue of The Liberator, published in 1831.

== Music video ==
On March 29, 2010, three weeks after The Monitor was released, Titus Andronicus premiered their music video for A More Perfect Union on their MySpace page. The video features the band playing outdoors in the snow, and was directed by Claire Carré. The video is, at 3 minutes and 35 seconds long, exactly half as long as the actual song, and ends after the recording of Garrison's speech, leaving out what Tom Breihan called "the raging second half" of the song.
