= USS Merrimac (1864) =

Sidewheel steamer

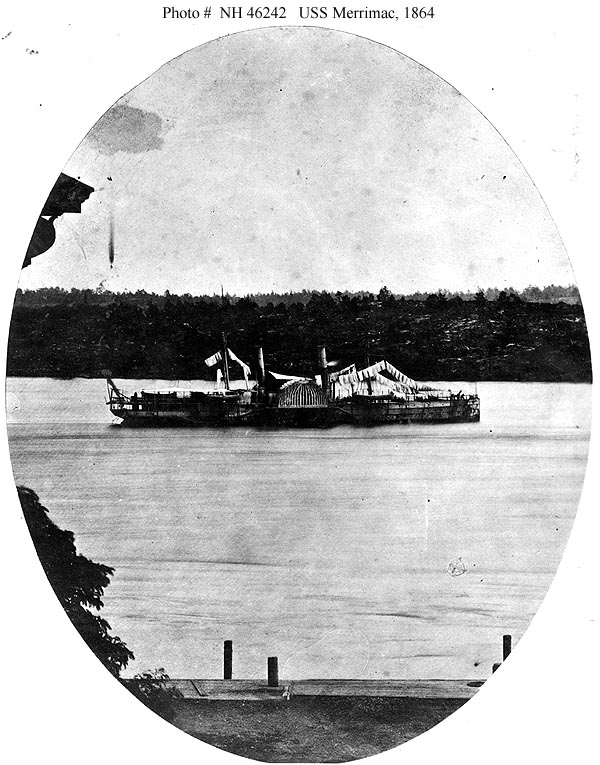
- USS Merrimac circa 1864

History

- Acquired: 10 March 1862
- Commissioned: 1 May 1862
- Captured: 24 July 1863
- Fate: Sunk, 15 February 1865

General characteristics
- Displacement: 635 tons
- Length: 230 ft (70 m)
- Beam: 30 ft (9.1 m)
- Draught: 8 ft 6 in (2.59 m)
- Propulsion: Steam
- Speed: 11.5 kts
- Complement: 116
- Armament: 2 30‑pdr. P.r., 4 24-pdrs, 2 12‑pdrs.

USS Merrimac was a sidewheel steamer first used in the Confederate States Navy that was captured and used in the United States Navy during the American Civil War.

Merrimac was purchased in England for the Confederate government in 1862. After a successful career as a blockade runner, she was captured by USS Iroquois off the coast of Cape Fear River, North Carolina, 24 July 1863. Purchased by the Navy from New York Prize Court 10 March 1864, Merrimac commissioned at New York 1 May 1864, Acting Master William P. Rogers in command.

After joining the East Gulf Blockading Squadron in June 1864, she was ordered to cruise in the Gulf of Mexico. She captured Cuban sloop Henretta sailing from Bayport, Florida, with cotton for Havana. However, late in July, yellow fever broke out among Merrimac's crew and she sailed north to allow her crew to recover. Upon arriving New York, she debarked her sick sailors at quarantine, and got underway for a cruise in the northwest Atlantic as far as St. John's, Newfoundland.

Early in 1865 Merrimac was reassigned to the East Gulf Blockading Squadron. She got underway for the gulf early in February, but encountered extremely bad weather which forced her to stop at Beaufort, North Carolina, on the 7th and at Charleston, South Carolina on the 12th. Underway for Key West the next day, Merrimac ran into still worse weather which she fought until turning north on the 14th to seek the first port. On the afternoon of 15 February 1865, Acting Master William Earle ordered the crew to abandon ship after its tiller had broken, two boilers given out and the pumps failed to slow the rising water. That night, when the crew had been rescued by mail steamer Morning Star, Merrimac was settling rapidly as she disappeared from sight. However, according to the Department of the Navy - Naval Historical Center, the ship sank on 15 January 1865.
