= USS Roanoke (1855) =

Merrimack-class screw frigate

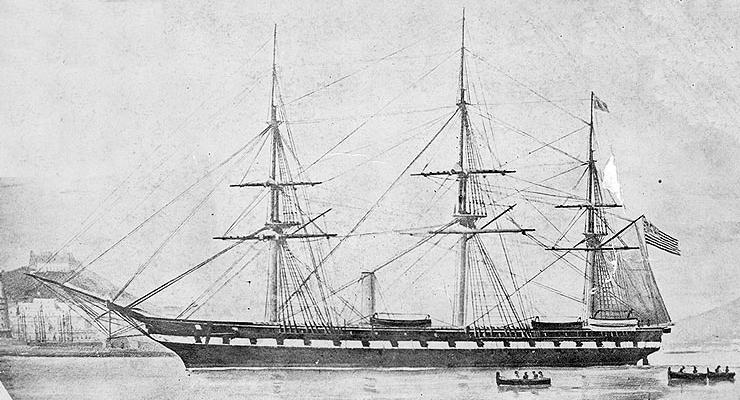
- USS Roanoke as a steam frigate

History

United States
- Name: USS Roanoke
- Namesake: Roanoke River
- Builder: Norfolk Navy Yard
- Laid down: May 1854
- Launched: 13 December 1855
- Commissioned: 4 May 1857
- Decommissioned: 24 September 1857
- Recommissioned: 18 August 1858
- Decommissioned: 1860
- Recommissioned: 20 June 1861
- Decommissioned: 25 March 1863
- Refit: 25 March 1862
- Recommissioned: 29 June 1863 as a monitor
- Decommissioned: 20 June 1865
- Recommissioned: 13 January 1874
- Decommissioned: 12 June 1875
- Stricken: 5 August 1882
- Fate: Sold for scrap, 27 September 1883

General characteristics (as built)
- Class & type: Merrimack-class screw frigate
- Displacement: 4,472 long tons (4,544 t)
- Tons burthen: 3,400 bm
- Length: 263 ft 8 in (80.4 m) (p/p)
- Beam: 51 ft 4 in (15.6 m)
- Draft: 23 ft 9 in (7.2 m)
- Depth of hold: 26 ft 2 in (8.0 m)
- Installed power: 996 ihp (743 kW); 4 Martin boilers
- Propulsion: 1 shaft; 1 Trunk steam engine
- Sail plan: Ship rig
- Speed: 8.8 knots (16.3 km/h; 10.1 mph)
- Complement: 674
- Armament: 1 × 10 in (254 mm) smoothbore Dahlgren gun; 28 × 9 in (229 mm) Dahlgren guns; 14 × 8 in (203 mm) Dahlgren guns

General characteristics (after reconstruction)
- Type: Monitor
- Displacement: 6,300 long tons (6,400 t)
- Beam: 53 ft 3 in (16.2 m)
- Speed: 8.5 knots (15.7 km/h; 9.8 mph)
- Complement: 347
- Armament: 2 × 15 in (381 mm) Dahlgren guns; 2 × 150-pounder Parrott rifle; 2 × 11 in (279 mm) Dahlgren guns
- Armor: Waterline belt: 3.5–4.5 in (89–114 mm); Deck: 1.5 in (38 mm); Gun turrets: 11 in (279 mm); Pilothouses: 9 in (229 mm)

USS Roanoke was a wooden-hulled Merrimack-class screw frigate built for the United States Navy in the mid-1850s. She served as flagship of the Home Squadron in the late 1850s and captured several Confederate ships after the start of the American Civil War in 1861. The ship was converted into an ironclad monitor during 1862–63; the first ship with more than two gun turrets in history. Her conversion was not very successful as she rolled excessively, and the weight of her armor and turrets strained her hull. Her deep draft meant that she could not operate off shallow Confederate ports and she was relegated to harbor defense at Hampton Roads, Virginia for the duration of the war. Roanoke was placed in reserve after the war and sold for scrap in 1883.

== Description ==
Roanoke was 263 feet 8 inches (80.4 m) long between perpendiculars and had a beam of 51 feet 4 inches (15.6 m). The ship had a draft of 23 feet 9 inches (7.2 m) and a depth of hold of 26 ft 2 in (8.0 m). She displaced 4,472 long tons (4,544 t) and had a burthen of 3,400 tons. Roanoke's hull was strongly reinforced by wrought iron straps. Her crew numbered 674 officers and enlisted men.

The ship had one horizontal two-cylinder trunk steam engine driving a single propeller using steam provided by four Martin boilers. The engine produced a total of 996 indicated horsepower (743 kW) and the ship had a maximum speed of 8.8 knots (16.3 km/h; 10.1 mph) under steam alone. The propeller could be hoisted and the single funnel lowered to increase speed under sail alone. Roanoke was ship rigged and had a sail area of 28,008 square feet (2,602 m^{2}). In 1861, the ship's armament consisted of one 10-inch (254 mm) smoothbore Dahlgren pivot gun, twenty-eight 9-inch (229 mm) Dahlgren guns and fourteen 8-inch (203 mm) Dahlgren guns. The 10-inch Dahlgren weighed 12,500 pounds (5,700 kg) and could fire a 103-pound (46.7 kg) shell up to a range of 3,000 yards (2,700 m) at +19° elevation. The nine-inch gun weighed 9,200 pounds (4,200 kg) and could fire a 72.5-pound (32.9 kg) shell to a range of 3,357 yards (3,070 m) at an elevation of +15°. The eight-inch Dahlgren had a range of 2,300 yards (2,100 m) at an elevation of +10° with a 51.5-pound (23.4 kg) shell. It weighed 6,500 pounds (2,900 kg).

=== Steam frigate service ===
Roanoke, named after the Roanoke River, was laid down at the Norfolk Navy Yard in May 1854 and launched on 13 December 1855. The ship sank when launched and had to be refloated before she could be completed. She was commissioned on 4 May 1857 with Captain John B. Montgomery in command.

Assigned to the Home Squadron as flagship, Roanoke transported the American filibuster and former President of Nicaragua, William Walker, and his men back to the United States from Aspinwall, Colombia, (now called Colón, Panamá). Roanoke arrived on 4 August and the ship was decommissioned at the Boston Navy Yard on 24 September 1857. Recommissioned on almost a year later on 18 August 1858, Roanoke resumed her duties as flagship of the Home Squadron. For over a year, she was stationed at Aspinwall awaiting the arrival of the first Japanese embassy to the United States to ratify the 1858 Treaty of Amity and Commerce. They reached Aspinwall on 25 April 1860 and Roanoke reached Hampton Roads on 12 May 1860 with the delegation and was again decommissioned.

After the start of the Civil War, Roanoke recommissioned on 20 June 1861 and was assigned to the North Atlantic Blockading Squadron. She destroyed the schooner Mary off Lockwood Folly Inlet, North Carolina, on 13 July 1861. The ship subsequently helped to capture the schooners Albion and Alert and the ship Thomas Watson off Charleston, South Carolina, on 15 October 1861.

Roanoke's deep draft prevented her from engaging the Confederate casemate ironclad CSS Virginia (her former sister USS Merrimack) during the Battle of Hampton Roads on 8–9 March 1862. The ship ferried north survivors from the sailing frigates USS Congress and USS Cumberland which Virginia had sunk. She arrived at New York City on 25 March, and decommissioned the same day to begin reconstruction as a monitor.

=== Ironclad reconstruction ===
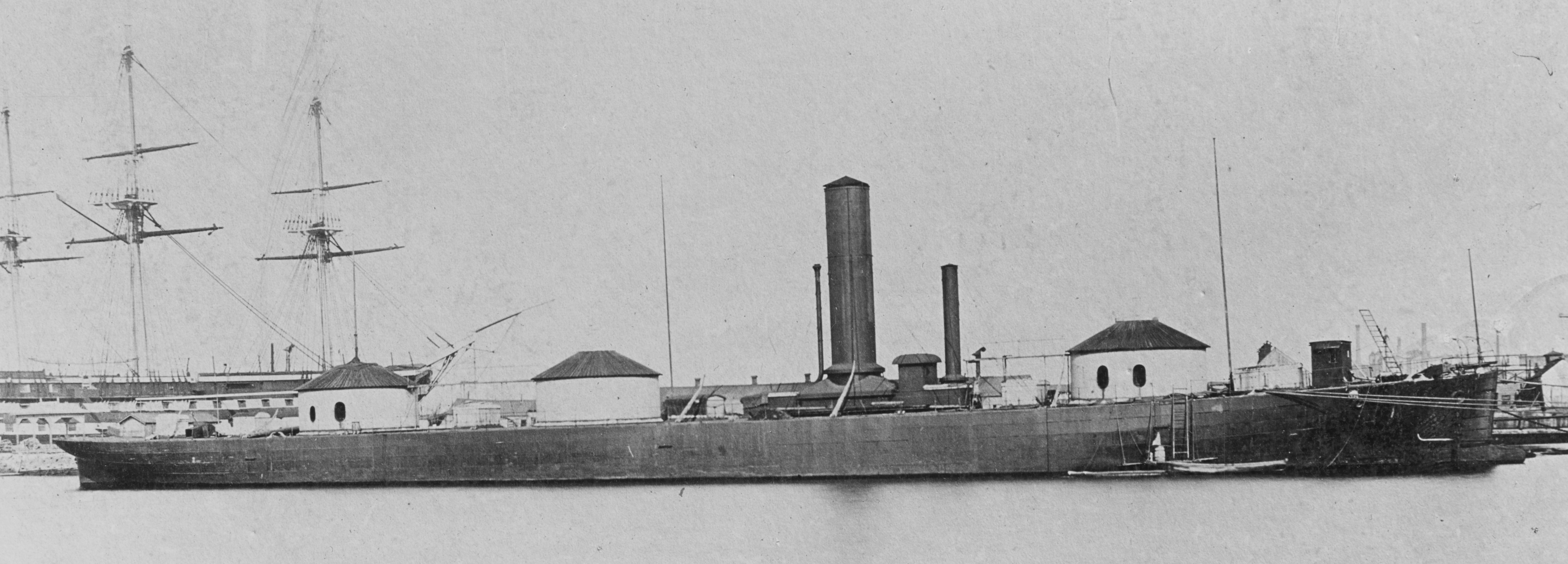
Roanoke after her conversion into a monitor

On 19 March 1862, 10 days after the Battle of Hampton Roads where the Monitor fought the Confederate ironclad Virginia to a standstill, John Lenthall, Chief of the Bureau of Construction and Repair, and the Chief of Steam Engineering, Benjamin F. Isherwood, wrote a letter to Gideon Welles, the Secretary of the Navy recommending that Roanoke be converted into a seagoing ironclad as that would be cheaper and faster than new construction. They suggested that the ship be cut down to the top of her gun deck, armoring her sides and deck and mounting four revolving Ericsson gun turrets, each mounting two 12-inch (305 mm) or 15-inch (381 mm) guns. This scheme would give her an ample 6 feet (1.8 m) of freeboard. Aside from reinforcing her hull to carry the weight of the turrets, the only other changes that they recommended were the elimination of the hoisting screw, replacement by a propeller smaller in diameter, and the addition of a ram. The wrought iron side armor would be a maximum of 6 inches (152 mm) in thickness with a taper down to 4.5 inches (114 mm) at its bottom edge, about 4 feet (1.2 m) below the waterline. The deck armor was to be 2.5-inch (64 mm) thick and an additional steam engine would be necessary to rotate the turrets and run the ventilation fans. They estimated that this conversion would take three and a half months and cost $495,000.

Welles accepted their recommendation and Roanoke began her reconstruction at the Brooklyn Navy Yard when she arrived in New York City on 25 March. The navy yard removed her masts, rigging and everything above the upper deck except her funnel while the Novelty Iron Works located at 12th street, New York, received a contract in early April to shape and mount all of her metal work. To save weight the number of turrets was reduced to three and her deck armor to 1.5 inches (38 mm). Each turret was virtually identical to those of the Passaic-class monitors and consisted of eleven layers of 1-inch (25 mm) plates. The forward two turrets were surmounted by a stationary pilothouse with armor nine inches thick. Novelty was given a choice in protecting Roanoke's sides, it could either with six layers of 1-inch (25 mm) plates or a single plate 4.5 inches (114 mm) thick that reduced to 3.5 inches (89 mm) inches below the waterline. It chose the latter and delays in their delivery were largely responsible for drawing out the reconstruction time to around a year. The plates were manufactured by the "Franklin Forge" of Tugnot, Dally & Co.

An auxiliary boiler was added to provide steam for the engines that powered the turrets, fans and steering and little to nothing was done to reinforce the hull to withstand the weight of her armor and turrets. The deck beneath each 125-long-ton (127 t) turret was reinforced by a series of stanchions that transferred their weight to the ship's bottom, which was not reinforced to handle their weight. The stress caused Roanoke to leak around 1.5 feet (0.5 m) per day by the end of the war. In her new configuration, her crew numbered 347 officers and men.

Roanoke was armed with two muzzle-loading smoothbore 15-inch Dahlgren guns, two 11 in (279 mm) Dahlgren guns and a pair of eight-inch, 150-pounder Parrott rifles. The forward turret mounted one 15-inch Dahlgren and a 150-pounder Parrot rifle, the middle turret was fitted with 15- and 11-inch Dahlgrens and the aft turret with one 11-inch Dahlgren and a 150-pounder rifle. Shortages of the 15-inch Dahlgren forced the substitution of two 11-inch Dahlgrens. Each of the former guns weighed approximately 43,000 pounds (20,000 kg). They could fire a 350-pound (158.8 kg) shell up to a range of 2,100 yards (1,900 m) at an elevation of +7°. The 11-inch Dahlgren weighed 16,000 pounds (7,300 kg) and could fire a 136-pound (61.7 kg) shell up to a range of 1,710 yards (1,560 m) at +5° elevation. The 150-pounder Parrot rifle weighed 16,300 pounds (7,400 kg) and fired eight-inch shells that weighed 132 to 175 pounds (60 to 79 kg).

Roanoke was also fitted with an ax-shaped ram. It was formed from two 4.5-inch plates that projected past her bow and presumably was the height of a single plate, 24 inches (0.6 m).

=== Ironclad service ===
The ship was accepted by the Navy on 16 April 1863 although she was not recommissioned until 29 June, the first warship with more than two turrets in history. Ignoring pressure by local politicians to keep Roanoke in New York, the Navy ordered her to Hampton Roads, Virginia, to join the blockading squadron there. On the voyage south, the ship reached a maximum speed of 8.5 knots (15.7 km/h; 9.8 mph) and averaged 7 knots (13 km/h; 8.1 mph). Captain Benjamin F. Sands reported that the ship's roll was so great that it would "preclude the possibility of fighting her guns at sea, and I was obliged to secure them with pieces of timber to prevent them fetching away". Roanoke was assigned as harbor defense ship at Hampton Roads where she remained through the end of the war. On 14 July, Sands test-fired his guns for the first time and both of the 15-inch Dahlgrens and one 150-pounder Parrott rifle dismounted themselves by their violent recoil. Her rear turret required nearly 5 minutes to make a full rotation. Captain Guert Gansevoort replaced Sands in command of the ship later in 1863. He was succeeded by Captain Augustus Kilty.

Roanoke arrived back in New York on 27 April 1865. She was decommissioned and placed in reserve on 20 June at New York Navy Yard. The ship's only postwar service was as ceremonial flagship of Vice Admiral Stephen Rowan, the Port Admiral at New York. She was recommissioned on 13 January 1874 and hosted a delegation from the Senate Committee on Naval Affairs on 11 August. Roanoke was reduced to reserve again on 12 June 1875; an assessment of her condition in 1876 noted that "this ship requires rebuilding with iron frame and plating". On 5 August 1882, the ship was struck from the Navy List and subsequently sold for scrap on 27 September 1883.

== See also ==
- List of steam frigates of the United States Navy
- Bibliography of early American naval history
- Union Navy
