= USS Clematis =

Tugboat of the United States Navy

History

United States
- Laid down: date unknown
- Launched: 1863
- Acquired: 2 August 1864
- Commissioned: 14 September 1864
- Decommissioned: 6 June 1866
- Stricken: 1866 (est.)
- Fate: Sold, 26 November 1866

General characteristics
- Displacement: 297 tons
- Length: 127 ft (39 m)
- Beam: 22 ft (6.7 m)
- Draught: 10 ft (3.0 m)
- Propulsion: steam engine
- Speed: 12 knots
- Complement: 46
- Armament: one 30-pounder rifle; two 12-pounder smoothbore guns

USS Clematis was a steamer acquired by the Union Navy during the American Civil War. She was used by the Union Navy to patrol navigable waterways of the Confederacy to prevent the South from trading with other countries.

Clematis, a steam tugboat, was built in 1863 at Cleveland, Ohio, and purchased by the Navy 2 August 1864. She was taken to New York Navy Yard to be outfitted, and placed in commission there 14 September 1864.

== North Atlantic Blockade operations ==
Departing New York 4 October 1864 with the monitor Mahopac in tow, Clematis arrived at Fort Monroe, Virginia, 6 October. She operated as a tug in the James and Elizabeth Rivers and at Norfolk Navy Yard until 5 November when she sailed for duty on the blockade off Wilmington, North Carolina.

== Gulf Coast Blockade operations ==
After repairs in Norfolk, Virginia, from 13 December 1864, Clematis again served up the James River in March and April 1865. On 27 April she cleared Fort Monroe, Virginia, for Mobile, Alabama, arriving 21 May 1865. Retained in service at the close of the Civil War, she served the Gulf Squadron until 23 May 1866 when she sailed for Philadelphia Navy Yard, arriving 31 May.

== Final decommissioning and sale ==
She was placed out of commission 6 June 1866 and sold 26 November 1866.
