= Titus Andronicus (band) =

American punk/indie rock band

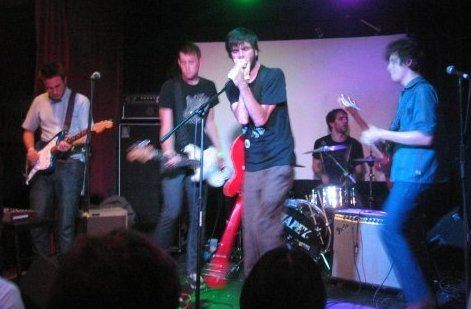
- Performing in 2008

Background information
- Origin: Glen Rock, New Jersey, U.S.
- Genres: Punk rock; indie rock; art punk; heartland rock
- Years active: 2005–present
- Labels: Merge; XL; Troubleman Unlimited
- Members: Patrick Stickles; Liam Betson; R.J. Gordon; Chris Wilson
- Past members: Matt Miller; Martin Courtney; See members section for others
- Website: www.titusandronicus.net

Titus Andronicus is an American indie rock band formed in Glen Rock, New Jersey, in 2005. The band is composed of singer-lyricist-guitarist Patrick Stickles, guitarist Liam Betson, bassist R.J. Gordon, keyboardist Mike Carson, and drummer Chris Wilson. The group takes its name from the Shakespeare play Titus Andronicus, and has cited musical and stylistic influences such as Neutral Milk Hotel and Pulp.

== Career ==
Titus Andronicus's first album, The Airing of Grievances, was released in April 2008 and was described as the sound of a "violent, overblown and irreverent" indie band in a positive review by Pitchfork. The band went on extensive tours of North America and Europe to promote the album through 2009, including a "Bring On The Dudes Tour" with friends the So So Glos and tours opening for Ted Leo and the Pharmacists and Lucero.

In 2010 the band released their second album, The Monitor, through XL Recordings. A sprawling concept album loosely based on themes relating to the American Civil War, it was critically well received, and debuted at No. 7 on the Billboard Heatseekers chart. That month, Rolling Stone named the band one of the seven best new bands of 2010. The band continued their extensive touring that included a tour of record stores, tours opening for the Pogues, Bright Eyes, and Okkervil River, plus appearances at Coachella Valley Music and Arts Festival, Lollapalooza, and Roskilde Festival. Titus Andronicus recorded a version of Nirvana's "Breed" for the tribute album Newermind at this time as well.

Their third album, Local Business, was released in 2012. A more stripped down record, Local Business was recorded live in the studio with almost no overdubs, creating an album that was "plug-in-and-play" ready, helping the band sound as close as possible to the album when playing live. It was listed at number 38 on Rolling Stone's 50 Best Albums of 2012, reached number 105 on the Billboard Top 200 chart, and gained positive reviews as well as a 7.0 from Pitchfork. Touring for the album included an expansive headlining tour with opener Ceremony, a co-headlining trek of the United Kingdom with Fucked Up, and another tour with the So So Glos dubbed the "Bring Back The Dudes Tour."

The band released their fourth album, The Most Lamentable Tragedy, on 2015 via Merge Records. Taking the form of a 93-minute, 29-song, five-act rock opera (including covers of Daniel Johnston and the Pogues), Stickles described the record as a "complicated metaphor about manic depression, melding elements of philosophy, psychology, and science fiction through the plight of one troubled protagonist’s inner demons." The band also disclosed a film element to the album and thus far released a 15-minute music video covering Act Two. The Most Lamentable Tragedy was released to positive reviews, and the group announced a "TMLT Around the World Tour" covering the United States and Europe.

Their fifth LP, A Productive Cough, was released in 2018 via Merge Records. It featured a "ballad oriented approach" not seen previously on Titus Andronicus albums, and was followed by a stripped down two piece tour featuring Stickles and keyboardist Alexander Molini. Their sixth album, An Obelisk, was released in 2019 via Merge Records.

Titus Andronicus has performed live on Late Night with Jimmy Fallon and Last Call with Carson Daly twice. Their song "Titus Andronicus" was used in an episode of the TV show Elementary entitled "The Adventure of the Nutmeg Concoction". "Titus Andronicus Forever" was featured in the TV show Bored to Death and the film Premium Rush, while "Dimed Out" was used to close out the first season of the Showtime show Billions.

Original keyboardist Matt Miller died in March 2021 at the age of 34.

Their seventh studio album The Will to Live was released on September 30, 2022.

== Band members ==
Current members

- Patrick Stickles – lead vocals, guitar, keyboards (2005–present)
- Liam Betson – guitar, percussion, backing vocals (2006–2008, 2009, 2011–2013, 2016–present)
- R.J. Gordon – bass, backing vocals (2016–present)
- Chris Wilson – drums (2016–present)
- Michael Carson – keyboards (2022-present)

Former members

- Sarim Al-Rawi – drums (2005–2006)
- Alexi Crawford – guitar (2005–2006)
- Matt Miller † – keyboard (2005–2006; died 2021)
- Dan Tews – guitar, percussion, backing vocals (2005–2008)
- Ian Graetzer – bass (2005–2011)
- Martin Courtney – keyboard (2006)
- Ian Dykstra – drums (2006–2007)
- Alex Tretiak – drums (2007)
- Eric Harm – drums, percussion, backing vocals (2007–2015)
- Andrew Cedermark – guitar (2007, 2008–2009)
- Ian O'Neill – guitar (2008–2009)
- Pete Feigenbaum – guitar (2009)
- Amy Klein – guitar, violin (2010–2011)
- Dave Robbins – keyboard, guitar (2010–2011)
- Julian Veronesi – bass, backing vocals (2011–2015)
- Adam Reich – guitar, keyboards, percussion, backing vocals (2012–2016)
- Jonah Maurer – guitar (2013–2016)
- Elio DeLuca – piano, keyboards (2015–2016; 2008–2015 session)
- Alex Molini — piano, keyboards (2017-2018)

== Discography ==
=== Studio albums ===
Year	Album details	Peak chart positions						
Year	Album details	US	US Top Albums	US Heat	US Rock	US Alt	US Indie	US Taste
2008	The Airing of Grievances: Released: April 14, 2008; Labels: Troubleman Unlimited (original), XL (reissue)	—	—	—	—	—	—	—
2010	The Monitor: Released: March 9, 2010; Labels: XL	—	—	7	—	—	28	—
2012	Local Business: Released: October 22, 2012; Label: XL	105	105	3	35	20	21	10
2015	The Most Lamentable Tragedy: Released: July 28, 2015; Label: Merge	164	82	1	18	14	11	7
2018	A Productive Cough: Released: March 2, 2018; Label: Merge	—	81	2	—	—	13	25
2019	An Obelisk: Released: June 21, 2019; Label: Merge	—	73	6	—	—	17	—
2022	The Will to Live: Released: September 30, 2022; Label: Merge	—	—	—	—	—	—	—

=== Singles, EPs, and mixtapes ===
- Titus Andronicus EP (2005, Self-Released)
- "Titus Andronicus" b/w "Fear and Loathing in Mahwah, New Jersey" 7" (2007, Shake Appeal Recording Company)
- "Albert Camus" b/w "Upon Viewing Brueghel's 'Landscape with the Fall of Icarus'" 7" (2007, Troubleman Unlimited Records)
- "Titus Andronicus" b/w "Every Time I See the Light Parts 1 & 2" 7" (2008, Merok Records)
- "My Time Outside The Womb" b/w "To Old Friends & New" 7" (2009, Merok Records)
- The Innocents Abroad – Live in London 23/02/09 vinyl-only LP (2009, Rough Trade Shop Exclusive)
- "Four Score and Seven" 7" (2010, XL Recordings)
- Split 7" w/Free Energy "Anxiety Block" b/w "I'm Going Down" (2010, XL Recordings/DFA)
- Titus Andronicus LLC Mixtape Vol 1 (2012, Self-Released)
- Split 7" w/Ceremony "In a Big City" b/w "Everything Burns" (2012, XL Recordings/Matador Records)
- Record Store Day 12" "Still Life with Hot Deuce and Silver Platter" b/w "(I've Got A) Date Tonight," "The Dog" (2013, XL Recordings)
- Seven 7"s Series #1 & #2: 7-Year Anniversary 2x7” (2014, Self-Released)
- Seven 7"s Series #3: Split w/Wicked Kind "Stranded (On My Own)" b/w "Sport," "Piece of the Pie" (2014, Self-Released)
- Seven 7"s Series #4: Split w/Lost Boy? "Fatal Flaw" b/w "Dairy Queen" (2015, Self-Released)
- Titus Andronicus LLC Mixtape Vol 2: Sorry About the Delay (2015, Self-Released)
- Seven 7"s Series #5: Split w/Diarrhea Planet "Upon Viewing Oregon's Landscape With the Flood of Detritus" b/w "Enter The Great Gate," "Babyhead" (2015, Self-Released)
- Seven 7"s Series #6: Split w/Spider Bags "Dimed Out" b/w "Dishrag" (2015, Self-Released)
- Seven 7"s Series #7: "Mr. E Mann [Remix]" b/w "Fired Up [Remix]" (2016, Self-Released)
- Titus Andronicus Mixtape Volume III : A Reductive Scoff (2018, Self-Released)
- Home Alone On Halloween 12" EP (2018, Merge Records)
