= Patrick Stickles =

American musician (born 1985)

Patrick Stickles (born July 28, 1985) is an American musician and the lead singer, frontman, and songwriter of New Jersey–based punk rock band Titus Andronicus.

Stickles grew up in Glen Rock, New Jersey, and graduated from Glen Rock High School as part of the class of 2004.

== Musical career ==
Stickles started Titus Andronicus in 2005 when he was a student at Ramapo College. As of 2008, when Titus Andronicus was still relatively obscure, he lived with his parents in their suburban New Jersey home. In addition to performing in Titus Andronicus, he has worked at Brooklyn DIY concert venue Shea Stadium as a ticket-taker, where his band practiced until its closing in 2017.
