= Ironclads (film) =

- Poster
- Written by: Harold Gast
- Directed by: Delbert Mann
- Starring: Virginia Madsen; Alex Hyde-White; E. G. Marshall; Fritz Weaver; Philip Casnoff; Reed Diamond
- Music by: Allyn Ferguson
- Country of origin: United States
- Original language: English

Production
- Producers: David A. Rosemont; Norman Rosemont
- Cinematography: William Wages
- Editor: Millie Moore
- Running time: 94 minutes
- Production companies: Turner Pictures; Rosemont Productions

Original release
- Network: TNT
- Release: March 11, 1991

Ironclads is a 1991 made-for-television movie produced by Ted Turner's TNT company about the events behind the creation of CSS Virginia from the remains of USS Merrimack and the battle between Virginia and USS Monitor in the Battle of Hampton Roads, March 8, 1862 – March 9, 1862. Noel Taylor received an Emmy Award nomination for his costume designs for the production.

== Plot ==
Quartermaster's Mate Leslie Harmon is awaiting a court martial when he is brought to Commodore Joseph Smith (E.G. Marshall) and his son Lieutenant Joseph B. Smith Jr. (Kevin O'Rourke). He deliberately interfered with the militarily necessary demolition of the dry dock at Hampton Roads Naval Base to prevent collateral damage and civilian casualties, as Confederates overran the base.

Harmon is introduced to Miss Betty Stuart, a Virginia Southern belle educated in Baltimore who wishes to help Harmon spy on the Confederate States Navy at Gosport on the raised and refitted USS Merrimack, now the ironclad CSS Virginia. Once in the South, Harmon encounters many key naval officers and learns that the armor test on 3 inches (76 mm) of iron plate is staged to offer misinformation to any Union spies—like him. In reality, Virginia boasts 4 inches (100 mm) of armor and cannot be pierced by any Union guns. Harmon and Betty realize that this information must make it to Washington to improve firepower to sink Virginia.

However, Betty has a change of heart upon learning that her childhood friend and lover, Lieutenant Catesby ap Roger Jones, has been reassigned as the second-in-command of the Virginia and is now in danger of death due to the very intelligence she intended to send North. She tries to stop Harmon from going north with the intelligence, but he goes anyway. At the commissioning ceremony for Virginia, she confesses to her now-fiancé Lt. Jones that she had helped Leslie Harmon infiltrate the shipyard and spy for the Union, warning him of the possible increase in firepower. He is stunned and distraught at her betrayal, yet sails to war without turning her in as one final act of love for his traitorous fiancé. Virginia sails off to break the Union blockade at Hampton Roads. Betty is promptly arrested by Lt. Guilford (Philip Casnoff), an admiral's aide and spy hunter, on suspicion of espionage.

Virginia first approaches USS Congress as her skipper, Lt. Smith, rallies his men on board to do their duty. Captain Franklin Buchanan (Leon B. Stevens) of Virginia rallies his men similarly. Congress fires a full broadside into Virginia to no effect. In the ensuing action, Virginia bypasses Congress, promptly sinks USS Cumberland, and returns to sink Congress. Lt. Smith is killed; taking over command, executive officer Lt. Pendergrast orders the ship's surrender. Though Virginia's crew are jubilant, rifle fire from Union troops ashore enrages Captain Buchanan. He goes topside to return fire and is wounded, thereupon ordering Jones to assume command and set Congress ablaze.

That same night, Lt. Guilford interrogates Betty, who denies being a spy based on an intercepted letter to her from Lt. Smith. She is informed then of Smith's death aboard Congress. When informed that her fate is the gallows if she does not cooperate, she hopes for the courtesy and respect shown an executed spy the day before (whose hanging she witnessed). Lt. Guilford rebuffs her, showing his contempt for her treason when compared to the bravery of the hanged soldier who was honorably fighting for his side.

During the night, USS Monitor sails in between the burning Congress and Virginia to protect USS Minnesota, which has run aground and is defenseless until high tide returns the next day. Only the low tide has prevented Virginia from finishing off Minnesota immediately. Captain Van Brunt (Joel Abel) delivers orders to Captain John Worden (Andy Park) of Monitor, along with Leslie Harmon, who has volunteered his service as a pilot. Worden makes Harmon, familiar with Hampton Roads and Virginia, midshipman on the spot.

The morning of the second day of battle, Jones sights Monitor and describes her as "the test we face." Worden does his best to engage Virginia as far from Minnesota as he can, aided by Monitor's shallower draft, greater maneuverability, and the damage sustained by Virginia the previous day. As the two ships exchange fire, Virginia runs aground, but is able to pull free. Jones attempts to ram the Monitor but fails to do significant damage; Worden orders a return ramming attempt, but is blinded when a shell from Virginia strikes Monitor's pilot house. Monitor withdraws, having delayed Virginia from sinking Minnesota. In view of the damage to Virginia, the exhaustion of his crew, and the falling tide, Jones also decides to retire back to port.

Both sides claim victory, although the Monitor saved the rest of the blockade from destruction. Her designer, John Ericsson (Fritz Weaver), has an argument with Secretary of the Navy Gideon Welles (Conrad McLaren) over the use of insufficient powder in Monitor's guns to sink Virginia: Welles's officers respond that it was a calculated decision to prevent the guns from exploding and protect the lives of the crew.

Back at Gosport, Lt. Guilford is pleased to release Betty, informing her that she saved Virginia based on a report by Lt. Jones. Demonstrating Southern chivalry, he was pleased to not have to hang her. In reality, Lt. Jones used Betty's confession the day before to send false intelligence to the Union, which resulted in the lesser powder charges used by Monitor. Lt. Jones tells Betty that he could not bear to see her hang, but that he can never be with her again due to her treasonous actions. She is sent north, forever marked as a traitor to her family, friends, and fellow Virginians.

A voice-over narrative indicates that Virginia was scuttled two months later after Union troops took Norfolk, and that Monitor sank off Cape Hatteras at the end of the year.

== Cast ==
- Virginia Madsen - Betty Stuart, a double agent for the North and fiancée of Lt. Jones
- Alex Hyde-White - Lieutenant Catesby ap Roger Jones, Betty's Southern fiancée and executive officer of Virginia
- Reed Diamond - Quartermaster's Mate (later Midshipman) Leslie Harmon, a Union sailor and spy
- Philip Casnoff - Lieutenant Guilford, Southern navy officer and spy hunter
- E.G. Marshall - Commodore (later Rear Admiral) Joseph Smith
- Fritz Weaver - John Ericsson, designer of Monitor
- Leon B. Stevens - Captain Franklin Buchanan, commanding officer of Virginia until wounded by rifle fire
- Kevin O'Rourke - Lieutenant Joseph B. Smith, captain of Congress and Northern suitor of Betty
- Joanne Dorian - Blossom Stuart, Betty's mother
- Beatrice Bush - Opal, Blossom's maid and Betty's confidant
- Conrad McLaren - Gideon Welles, Secretary of the Union Navy
- Burt Edwards - Edwin M. Stanton, Secretary of War
- James Getty - President Abraham Lincoln
- Phil Whiteway - Commander Davis, Union Navy staff officer and member of the Ironclad Board
- Carl Jackson - Cletus, Opal's husband and Leslie Harmon's informant
- Marty Terry - Salome Coyt, Norfolk socialite
- Chris Northup - Spencer Brown, Union spy executed by Guilford
- Joan DeMarrais - Mrs. Fletcher, Norfolk socialite
- Michal Leamer - Ella Mae
- Roy Lind - Stephen Mallory, Secretary of the Confederate Navy
- Greg Baber - Sgt. Collins
- Michael Costello - Lt. Ramsey, chief engineer of Virginia
- J. Michael Hunter - Lt. Simms, gunnery officer of Virginia
- Michael Stanton Kennedy - Pilot Patten, harbor pilot of Virginia
- Gayle Turner - Quartermaster Williams, helmsman of Virginia
- Duke Lafoon - Seaman Yates
- Andy Park - John L. Worden, captain of Monitor
- George Kelly - Lt. Samuel Greene, executive officer of Monitor
- Ford Flannagan - Ensign William F. Keeler, paymaster and messenger of Monitor
- Mark Ransom Eis - Seaman Stodder
- Joel Abel - Captain Van Brunt of USS Minnesota
- Tom Width - Lt. Austin Pendergrast, executive officer of USS Congress
- Ernie Dunn - Ensign Stone

Alex Hyde-White later portrayed Union Major General Ambrose Burnside in the 2003 film Gods and Generals. Also, Philip Casnoff's character in this film is quite similar in accent and personality to his role in the 1985 miniseries North and South a few years prior, but with Southern chivalry and without the sociopathy.

In 2017, Hyde-White gave an interview to the "A Word on Westerns" YouTube channel, in which he recalled that most of the film's extras were Civil War reenactors using their own gear.

== Awards ==
This film was nominated for four Primetime Emmy Awards including Outstanding Achievement in Special Visual Effects, Outstanding Costume Design for a Miniseries or Special, Outstanding Sound Editing for a Miniseries or Special and Outstanding Sound Mixing for a Drama Miniseries or a Special. However, it did not win any of these awards.
