= USS Smith (DD-378) =

Mahan-class destroyer

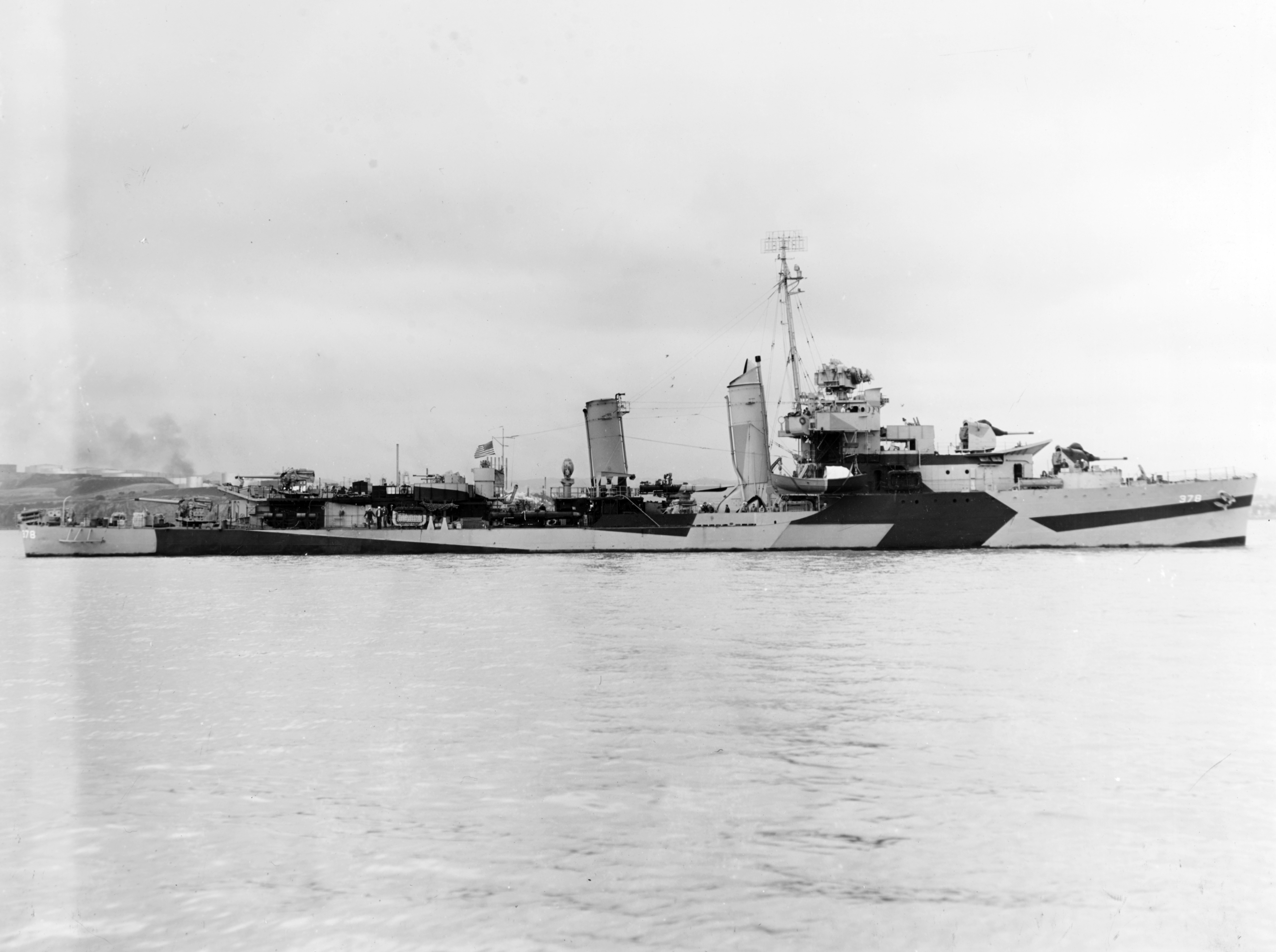
- USS Smith painted in a "Dazzle" camouflage variant known as Measure 31, Design 23d.

History

United States
- Name: Smith
- Namesake: Joseph B. Smith
- Builder: Mare Island Naval Shipyard
- Laid down: 27 October 1934
- Launched: 20 February 1936
- Commissioned: 19 September 1936
- Decommissioned: 28 June 1946
- Stricken: 25 February 1947
- Fate: Sold for scrapping, August 1947

General characteristics
- Class & type: Mahan-class destroyer
- Displacement: 1,500 tons
- Length: 341 ft 4 in (104.04 m)
- Beam: 35 ft (11 m)
- Draft: 9 ft 10 in (3.00 m)
- Speed: 37 knots (69 km/h; 43 mph)
- Complement: 8 officers and 150 enlisted crew
- Armament: As built: 1 × Gun Director above bridge, 5 × 5 in (127 mm)/38 cal. DP (5x1), 12 × 21 inch (533 mm) torpedo tubes (3x4), 4 × .50 cal (12.7 mm) AA machine guns (4x1), 2 × depth charge stern racks, c1944: 1 × Mk 33 Gun Fire Control System, 4 × 5 in (127 mm)/38 cal. DP (4x1), 12 × 21 in (533 mm) torpedo tubes (3x4), 2 × Mk 51 Gun Directors, 4 × Bofors 40 mm AA (2x2), 5 × Oerlikon 20 mm AA (5x1), 2 × depth charge roll-off stern racks, 4 × K-gun depth charge projectors

USS Smith (DD-378) was a Mahan-class destroyer in the United States Navy before and during World War II. She was named for Lieutenant Joseph B. Smith, USN. Smith was a senior officer aboard USS Congress and killed when CSS Virginia sank her.

== Early service ==
Smith's keel was laid down on 27 October 1934 at the Mare Island Naval Shipyard, Mare Island, California, and launched on 20 February 1936. The ship was sponsored by Mrs. Yancey S. Williams and commissioned on 19 September 1936. When active, the destroyer patrolled the West Coast waters for the next five years.

== World War II ==
=== 1941–42 ===
At the outbreak of the war, Smith was in San Francisco, California, where she was attached to Destroyer Squadron (DesRon) 5, performing escort duty between the west coast and Pearl Harbor until April 1942. On 7 April, Smith was assigned to Task Force (TF) 1, composed of Battleship Division 3, which held extensive training exercises along the West Coast until departing for Pearl Harbor on 1 June. Smith was then assigned to TF 17, commanded by Vice Admiral Marc Mitscher, engaged in war patrols and training exercises for a month; then escorted a convoy back to San Francisco. After overhaul and subsequent sea trials in the area, she returned to Pearl Harbor in mid-August and began a period of training and upkeep. On 15 October, she was assigned to TF 16 composed of the aircraft carrier Enterprise and battleship South Dakota. TF 16 departed Pearl Harbor on war patrol, on 16 October, and was joined the following week by the cruisers Portland and San Juan with their destroyer screen.

The task force was operating northwest of the New Hebrides Islands when, on 24 October, it was notified that a Japanese carrier force was converging on Guadalcanal. Task Force 17 (TF17), the aircraft carrier Hornet and her accompanying cruiser-destroyer screen, joined TF 16 and the merged force was designated TF 61.

On 26 October, scout planes from Enterprise located the Japanese force. At 0944, the first Japanese planes were sighted and Hornet was hit by bombs 30 minutes later. At 1125, Smith was attacked by a formation of 20 torpedo planes. Twenty minutes later, a Japanese torpedo plane crashed into her forecastle, causing a heavy explosion.

According to one version, the torpedo carried by the plane had not exploded on impact, but did so some time later. This caused even more damage and casualties. The forward part of the ship was enveloped in a sheet of smoke and flame from bursting gasoline tanks and the bridge had to be abandoned. The entire forward deckhouse was aflame, making topside forward of number one stack untenable. Smith's gunners downed six of the planes. By early afternoon, the crew had extinguished all of the fires forward—largely assisted by decision by her Commanding Officer, Lt.Cdr. Hunter Wood to steer the burning ship into the wake of South Dakota. With 57 killed or missing, 12 wounded, her magazines flooded, and temporary loss of steering control from the pilothouse, Smith retained her position in the screen with all serviceable guns firing. Action was broken off in the evening, and Smith headed to Nouméa for temporary repairs. She was patched up and underway for Pearl Harbor on 5 November. At Pearl Harbor, she underwent a yard overhaul and sea trials that lasted into February 1943. USS Smith was awarded the Presidential Unit Citation for continuing to fight despite crippling damage to the ship.

=== 1943 ===
Smith departed on 12 February for Espiritu Santo as screen for the auxiliary ship Wright. The destroyer Gridley joined the screen there, and the ships proceeded to Guadalcanal where Smith performed antisubmarine patrols until 12 March. She then returned to Espiritu Santo and participated in various patrols and tactical and logistical exercises with TF 10 in the New Caledonia-Coral Sea area until 28 April. Smith returned to Pearl Harbor the following month for logistics and then sailed for Australia.

Smith was attached to DesRon 5 which conducted exercises in the Townsville-Cape Moreton area to 10 June, and then escorted merchant shipping and landing craft to Milne Bay, remaining there the remainder of July. Smith departed for Mackay, Australia, and yard availability on 1 August. When this was completed, she returned to Milne Bay for further exercises and preparations for impending operations with the Seventh Fleet.

Smith, with destroyers Perkins, Conyngham, and Mahan, bombarded Finschhafen, New Guinea, on 23 August without opposition. The squadron returned to Milne Bay and participated in exercises until 2 September when it sailed with TF 76 for the Huon Gulf area of New Guinea. Smith bombarded targets in her assigned area of "Red Beach" prior to landings by the 9th Australian Infantry Division on 4 September. She remained in the area on offensive sweeps, antisubmarine patrols, and as antiaircraft defense until 18 September. On the night of 7/8 September, the squadron shelled Lae.

During the period 20 to 23 September, Smith participated in the bombardment and landings at Finschhafen as a unit of TF 76. The task force suffered enemy air attacks, but these did not manage to damage it and they lost 16 planes to fighter cover or naval gunfire. Smith then returned to Holnicote Bay for resupply operations to Lae and Finschhafen.

On 3 October, Smith, along with the destroyers Henley, and Reid were assigned to make an antisubmarinesweep of Huon Gulf. At 1821, three torpedo wakes were sighted abaft Smith's port beam. She made a right full rudder and slipped between two of the torpedoes—one passing 500 yards (460 m) to port, the other 200 yards (180 m) to starboard. Henley took a torpedo on the port side and, six minutes later, broke in half, disappearing from sight at 1832. Smith made a depth charge attack that proved futile. The squadron spent the remainder of the month in resupply operations to forward areas. Smith had a short availability period in Milne Bay the first of November and then returned to the Lae-Finschhafen area.

On 14 December, Smith was attached to the Arawe Attack Force forming at Holnicote Bay and departed for that operation. The next morning, she shelled "Orange Beach," Cape Merkus, and covered the operation with other units of DesRon 5. The squadron then returned to Milne Bay to prepare for the invasion of Cape Gloucester, New Britain.

Smith stood out from Buna on Christmas Day as escort for the Cape Gloucester Attack Force (TF 76) and as a unit of the bombardment group. The next morning, she shelled "Green Beach," Cape Gloucester, in preparation for the assault by Marines of the First Marine Division. She escorted resupply ships to the landing area the following week.

=== 1944 ===
Smith was a unit of the Saidor Attack Force when, on 1 January 1944, she was rammed astern by the destroyer Hutchins and forced to return to Milne Bay for repairs. She soon rejoined the squadron in resupply operations to Cape Gloucester and the Lae area. Smith shelled gun emplacements in the vicinity of Herwath Point and Singor, on 13 February, in preparation for the landings there.

On 28 February, Smith departed Cape Sudest, as a unit of the Admiralty Islands Attack Group, with 71 officers and men of the First Cavalry Division aboard to be landed on Los Negros Island. On 29 February, she began bombardment of designated targets along the northern shore of Hyane Harbor. The troops were landed and Smith provided call fire until that evening when she shuttled more troops to the landing area.

On 17 March, Smith, with DesRon 5, departed the South Pacific en route to San Francisco via Pearl Harbor. The overhaul period there was completed by 21 June; and the squadron sailed for Pearl Harbor, spending the next five weeks in training exercises and gunnery practice. On 1 August, Smith was ordered to Eniwetok and patrolled the enemy-occupied Marshall Islands until 24 September when she joined TG 57.9, composed of Cruiser Division 5, and departed for Saipan. The task group began offensive patrols of the Northern Marianas to protect that Central Pacific outpost from enemy attack. Smith returned to Eniwetok in early October, made an escort trip to Ulithi, and then sailed to Hollandia.

Smith was attached to the 7th Fleet on 26 October and the next day set course for Leyte Gulf, arriving at San Pedro three days later. She patrolled Leyte Gulf as a unit of TG 77.1 from 1 to 16 November and then escorted a convoy to New Georgia and back. She was ordered to rendezvous on 6 December with the Ormac Attack Group to bombard enemy positions ashore and then to land the 77th Army Division there. The group arrived in the Ormac Bay area the next morning, and Smith was stationed northeast of Ponson Island as fighter director ship. At 0945, enemy aircraft attacked the fleet. At least three kamikazes dived on the destroyers Mahan and three on Aaron Ward. Both were badly damaged and Mahan was later sunk by friendly gunfire when it was ascertained the fires could not be brought under control or the ship salvaged. Air attacks continued throughout the morning and when the landing force was disembarked, the attack group retired to Leyte.

Smith and DesRon 5, departing San Pedro with a resupply echelon for Ormac Bay on 11 December, were attacked that evening in Leyte Gulf by a force of enemy planes. At 1704, Reid was hit by a bomb and a suicide plane. There was a violent explosion, and she heeled over and sank at 1706. Smith downed four of the enemy planes. The next morning, the formation was again attacked by Japanese planes, and the destroyer Caldwell was hit by a kamikaze which set her afire. No other hits were sustained by the destroyers, and Smith continued resupply operations until 17 December when she sailed to Manus for logistics and maintenance.

=== 1945 ===
Smith was back in Leyte Gulf on 6 January 1945 as a unit in the screen of TG 79.2 proceeding to support amphibious landings in Lingayen Gulf, Luzon. There was a heavy air attack two days later in which the escort carrier Kitkun Bay was seriously damaged by a kamikaze. Smith, 3,000 yards (2,700 m) away, stood by to rescue survivors. She took on board over 200 sailors. On 9 January, she was able to transfer these men back to Kitkun Bay which was now proceeding under her own steam. Smith was then assigned to patrol the northern Lingayen Gulf. From 28 January to 20 February, she screened convoys to Hollandia, Sansapor, and Leyte. In Leyte on 20 February, she was assigned to screen a convoy to Mangarin Bay, Mindoro. While passing through the Mindanao Sea the next morning, the destroyer Renshaw was hit by a torpedo and seriously damaged. Smith went alongside to transfer wounded, furnish electricity, and begin pumping out the after engine room with fire and bilge pumps. She towed Renshaw for six hours until she was relieved, to proceed independently to San Pedro and transfer the wounded who had been taken on board.

En route to Mindoro on 24 February, Smith picked up a radar contact that failed to respond to her blinker requesting identification. When the contact was illuminated, it proved to be a Japanese steam lugger of 200 GRT. The target was taken under fire at 2147 and destroyed by 2158. Smith departed Mindoro on 26 February as a unit of the Puerta Princesa, Palawan Attack Group (TG 78.2). She was on station two days later and at 0818 began firing preliminary shore bombardment on "White Beach." She then patrolled the entrance of Palawan Harbor until 4 March. Smith was relieved from patrol and made two runs to Palawan as escort for supply ships.

On 24 March, Smith again sailed with TG 78.2. This time the objective was to transport and land American troops at Cebu City, Cebu Island. Smith bombarded the landing beaches the morning of the assault, 28 March, and after the forces landed, provided them with call fire. Over one eight-day period, she expended 1,200 rounds of 5-inch (130 mm) ammunition. On 23 April, she departed the Philippines with orders to join TG 78.1 at Morotai.

The group sortied from Morotai on 27 April 1945, transporting the 26th Australian Infantry Brigade to Tarakan Island, Borneo, for an amphibious landing. Smith began preliminary bombardment of the landing beaches at 0700, 1 May, and remained on station until the 19th as call fire support ship, screening picket, and harbor entrance patrol. Smith retired to Morotai, sailed to Zamboanga, rendezvoused with the tanker Mettawee and escorted her back to Tarakan. She then provided night gunfire support for the Australians until ordered back to Morotai.

There, she was attached to TG 78.2 on 26 June and again sailed for Borneo. This time the objective was Balikpapan, Borneo, where the First Australian Corps was to be landed. Smith began shore bombardment at 0700, 1 July, and received return fire from enemy guns ashore that splashed close aboard. The Japanese gunners finally got her range and sent three shells through her number one stack. The shells failed to explode, and only superficial damage was done. One visible gun emplacement was taken under counterbattery fire and silenced. Smith left the next day for Morotai, picked up a resupply convoy, and was back in Balikpapan on 16 July. She departed on the 24th for San Pedro and tender availability.

== Later service ==
Smith departed the Philippines on 15 August for Buckner Bay; remained there for two weeks and sailed for Nagasaki, Kyūshū. On 15 September, 90 ex-prisoners of war boarded; and, the next morning, Smith steamed for Okinawa to transfer them to the United States. She picked up 90 more Allied military personnel at Nagasaki on 21 September and transported them back to the attack transport Renville in Buckner Bay.

Smith arrived in Sasebo on 28 September and departed two days later for San Diego, via Pearl Harbor. She docked in San Diego on 19 November and remained there until ordered to Pearl Harbor on 28 December for disposal or inactivation. She arrived in Pearl Harbor on 3 January 1946 and assumed an inactive status. Smith was decommissioned on 28 June 1946 and struck from the Navy list on 25 February 1947. She was sold the following August.

Smith received six battle stars for World War II service.
