= Jeremiah Regan =

American Navy Quartermaster

Quartermaster Jeremiah Regan
- Born: c. 1832; Boston, Massachusetts, US
- Military career
- Allegiance: United States (Union)
- Branch: Navy
- Unit: USS Galena
- Conflicts: Battle of Drewry's Bluff
- Awards: Medal of Honor

Jeremiah Regan (born c. 1832) was a Quartermaster of the United States Navy who was awarded the Medal of Honor for gallantry during the American Civil War. When his ship, the USS Galena, attacked Drewry's Bluff, Virginia in the Battle of Drewry's Bluff, it was heavily damaged by shellfire with several crewmembers wounded or killed. Despite the danger of the situation, Regan continued to man his gun throughout the engagement. For these actions, he was awarded the Medal of Honor on 3 April 1863 by President Lincoln.

== Personal life ==
Regan was born in about 1832 in Boston, Massachusetts.

== Military service ==
Regan was the captain of the No. 2. gun aboard the USS Galena, which was the lead ship of a Union Navy flotilla that attempted to raid the Confederates' unfinished Fort Drewry (also known as Fort Darling) on 15 May 1862. During the attack on Drewry's Bluff and the fort, Regan continued to man his gun despite the fire directed at the ship from Confederate sharpshooters and an artillery shell which injured or killed most of his crewmates. He made a dangerous climb up the forerigging under heavy fire and cleared the halyards, throwing away the ship's white flag. He then returned to man his gun. Regan was one of three crew members to receive a Medal of Honor for action on that day, the others being First Class Fireman Charles Kenyon and Marine Corporal John Mackie.

Regan's Medal of Honor citation reads:

The President of the United States of America, in the name of Congress, takes pleasure in presenting the Medal of Honor to Quartermaster Jeremiah Regan, United States Navy, for extraordinary heroism in action while serving as Captain of No. 2 gun on board the U.S.S. Galena in the attack upon Drewry's Bluff, Virginia, 15 May 1862. With his ship severely damaged by the enemy's shellfire and several men killed and wounded, Quartermaster Regan continued to man his gun throughout the engagement despite the concentration of fire directed against men at their guns by enemy sharpshooters in rifle pits along the banks.

— R. A. Alger, Secretary of War

A marker now stands in Richmond National Battlefield Park at 37° 25.329′ N, 77° 25.301′ W commemorating the three Medal of Honor awardees.
