= Edward B. Young =

Medal of Honor recipient

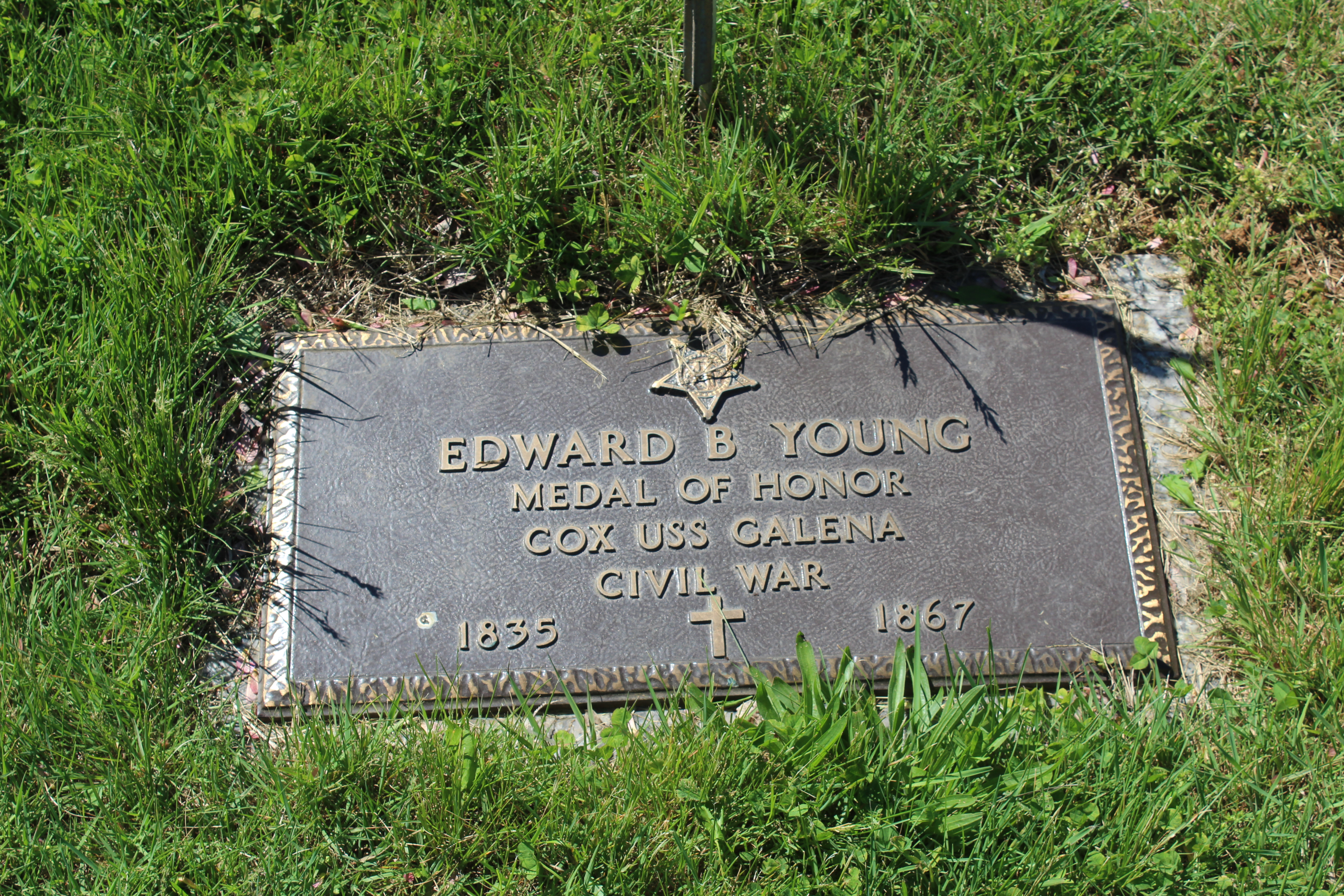
- Edward B. Young Memorial Marker at Rosedale Cemetery
- Born: c. 1835; Bergen, New Jersey
- Died: February 24, 1867 (aged 31–32)
- Military career
- Allegiance: United States
- Branch: United States Navy
- Rank: Coxswain
- Unit: USS Galena
- Conflicts: American Civil War • Battle of Mobile Bay
- Awards: Medal of Honor

Edward B. Young (c. 1835 – February 24, 1867) was a Union Navy sailor in the American Civil War and a recipient of the U.S. military's highest decoration, the Medal of Honor, for his actions at the Battle of Mobile Bay.

Born in about 1835 in Bergen, New Jersey, Young joined the Navy from that city. He served in the Civil War as a coxswain on the USS Galena. During the Battle of Mobile Bay on August 5, 1864, he displayed "skill and courage" as his ship assisted the disabled USS Oneida while under heavy fire. For this action, he was awarded the Medal of Honor the next year, on June 22, 1865.

Young's official Medal of Honor citation reads:

On board the U.S.S. Galena during the attack on enemy forts at Mobile Bay, 5 August 1864. Securely lashed to the side of the Oneida which had suffered the loss of her steering apparatus and an explosion of her boiler from enemy fire, the Galena aided the stricken vessel past the enemy forts to safety. Despite heavy damage to his ship from raking enemy fire, Young performed his duties with skill and courage throughout the action.

Young died on February 24, 1867, at age 31 or 32 and was buried in Lafayette Cemetery in Philadelphia and reinterred to Evergreen Memorial Park in Bensalem, Pennsylvania in 1947. Evergreen Memorial Park went out of business and became part of Rosedale Cemetery in 1960.
