= Lafayette Cemetery =

Defunct cemetery in Philadelphia, Pennsylvania, US

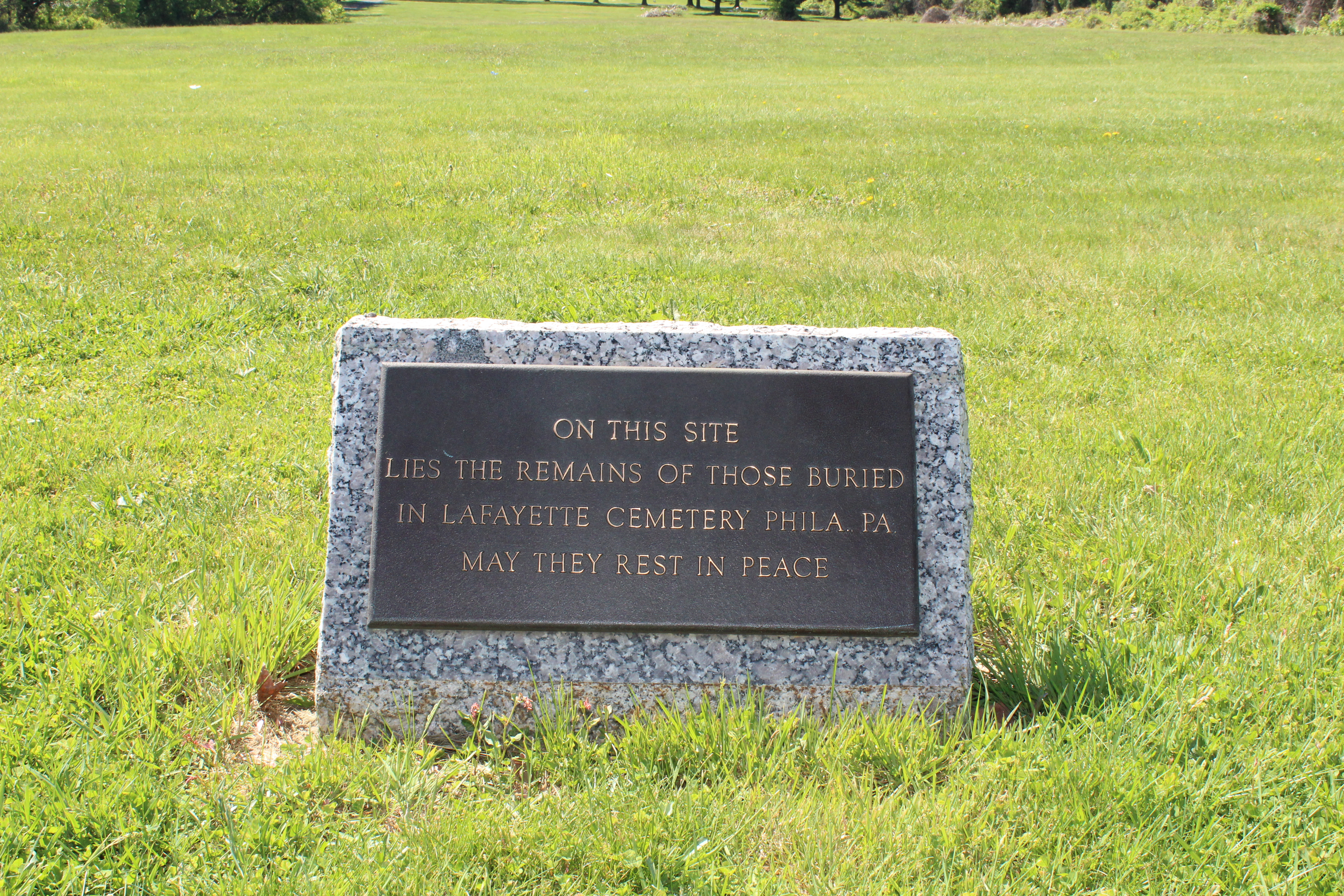
- Memorial marker for the reinterred remains from Lafayette Cemetery at Rosedale Cemetery
- Interactive map of Lafayette Cemetery

Details
- Established: 1828
- Location: Philadelphia, Pennsylvania
- Country: United States
- No. of graves: 47,000
- Find a Grave: Lafayette Cemetery

Lafayette Cemetery was a cemetery in the Passyunk Square neighborhood of Philadelphia, Pennsylvania. It was established in 1828 and originally intended for 14,000 burials, but over time, it fell into disrepair and became overcrowded with 47,000 burials. In 1946, the cemetery was condemned by the City of Philadelphia. The bodies were disinterred in 1947, transported to the Evergreen Memorial Park (now Rosedale Cemetery) in Bensalem, Pennsylvania, and reinterred in a mass grave.

The former cemetery site was repurposed by the City of Philadelphia as the Capitolo Playground.

== History ==
Lafayette Cemetery was established in 1828 on the block between Federal and Wharton Streets and 9th and 10th Streets in what was then Passyunk Township, later renamed the Passyunk Square neighborhood of Philadelphia, Pennsylvania. The Honorable Joel Barlow Sutherland was one of the founders.

Lafayette Cemetery was a part of the United States National Cemetery System during the American Civil War with a leased lot within the cemetery for soldiers who died in nearby hospitals. The cemetery contained the graves of 28 Union soldiers, many of whom were reinterred at the Philadelphia National Cemetery in 1885.

The cemetery was originally designed to hold 14,000 bodies and was surrounded by an iron fence. By 1946, it was in disrepair and overcrowded with 47,000 bodies. The city wanted to close the cemetery as early as the 1920s but the Great Depression and World War II delayed the process.

In the 1940s, the city condemned Lafayette Cemetery to transform it into a playground. The city contracted with Thomas A. Morris to relocate the remains to 40 acres at Evergreen Memorial Park in Bensalem, Pennsylvania. The agreement was for Morris to provide caskets, bronze markers, roadways, and perpetual care at the new cemetery location. Morris had also agreed to build a statue to the Marquis de Lafayette in the new cemetery. Morris received full title to the cemetery property, assessed at $166,000, and immediately sold it back to the city for use as a playground for $200,000.

There are no records of the removal and reburial of the bodies, as the state did not require it until 1953. Evergreen Memorial Park went out of business and became part of Rosedale Cemetery in 1960.

In 1988, construction near Rosedale Cemetery unearthed two concrete burial vaults containing several unidentified bodies. Further examination of the Evergreen Memorial Park site revealed that Morris had not honored the agreement but instead the bodies were reinterred in wooden boxes stacked in 32 mass grave trenches with no markers, roads, or statue of Lafayette.

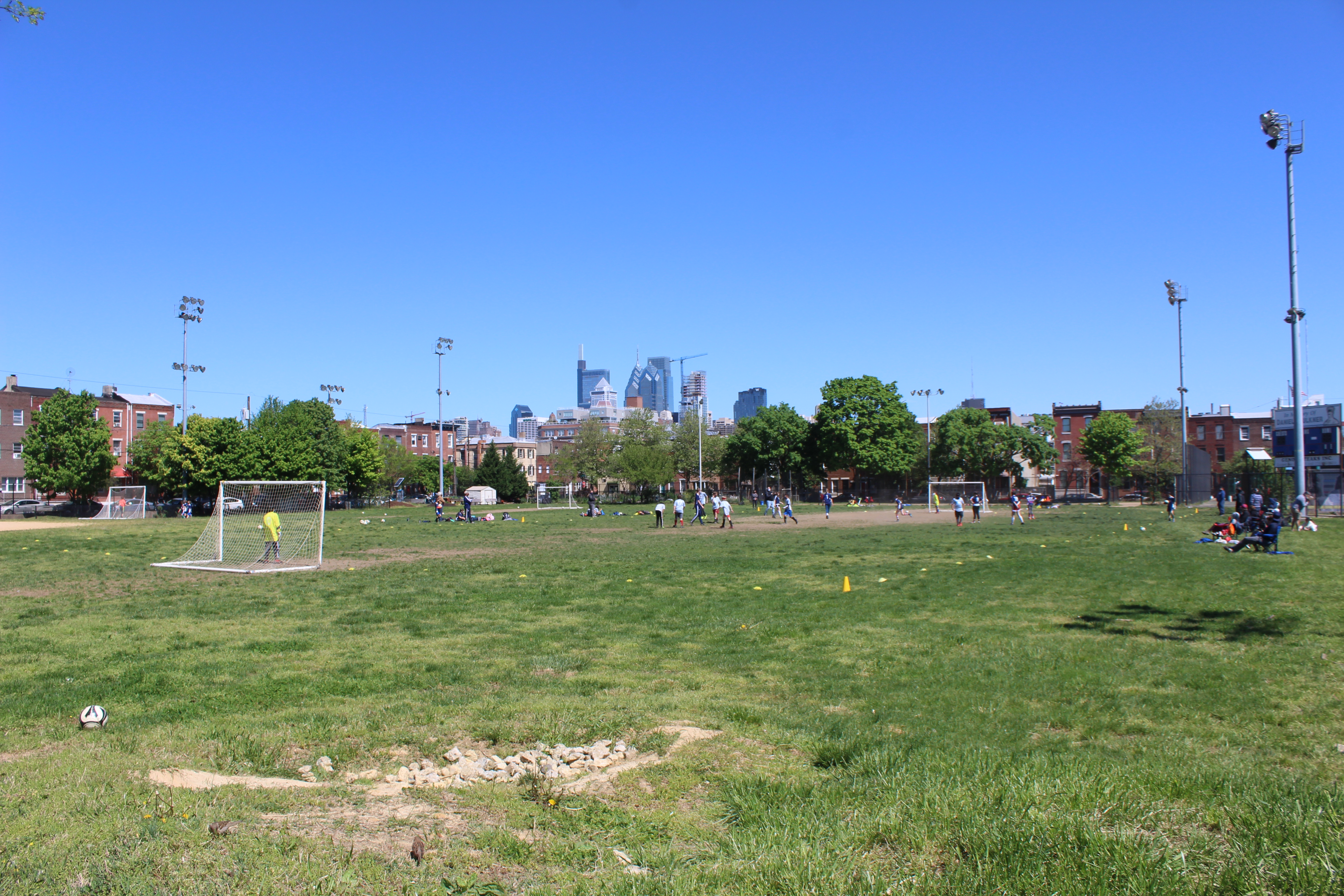
The former location of Lafayette Cemetery was repurposed as the Capitolo Playground

The former location of Lafayette Cemetery is used by the city of Philadelphia as the Capitolo Playground.

== Notable burials ==
- Charles Deakin (1837-1865), Medal of Honor recipient
- Matthew McClelland (1832-1883), Medal of Honor recipient
- Edward B. Young (1835-1867), Medal of Honor recipient
