= USS Robert Smith =

Clemson-class destroyer

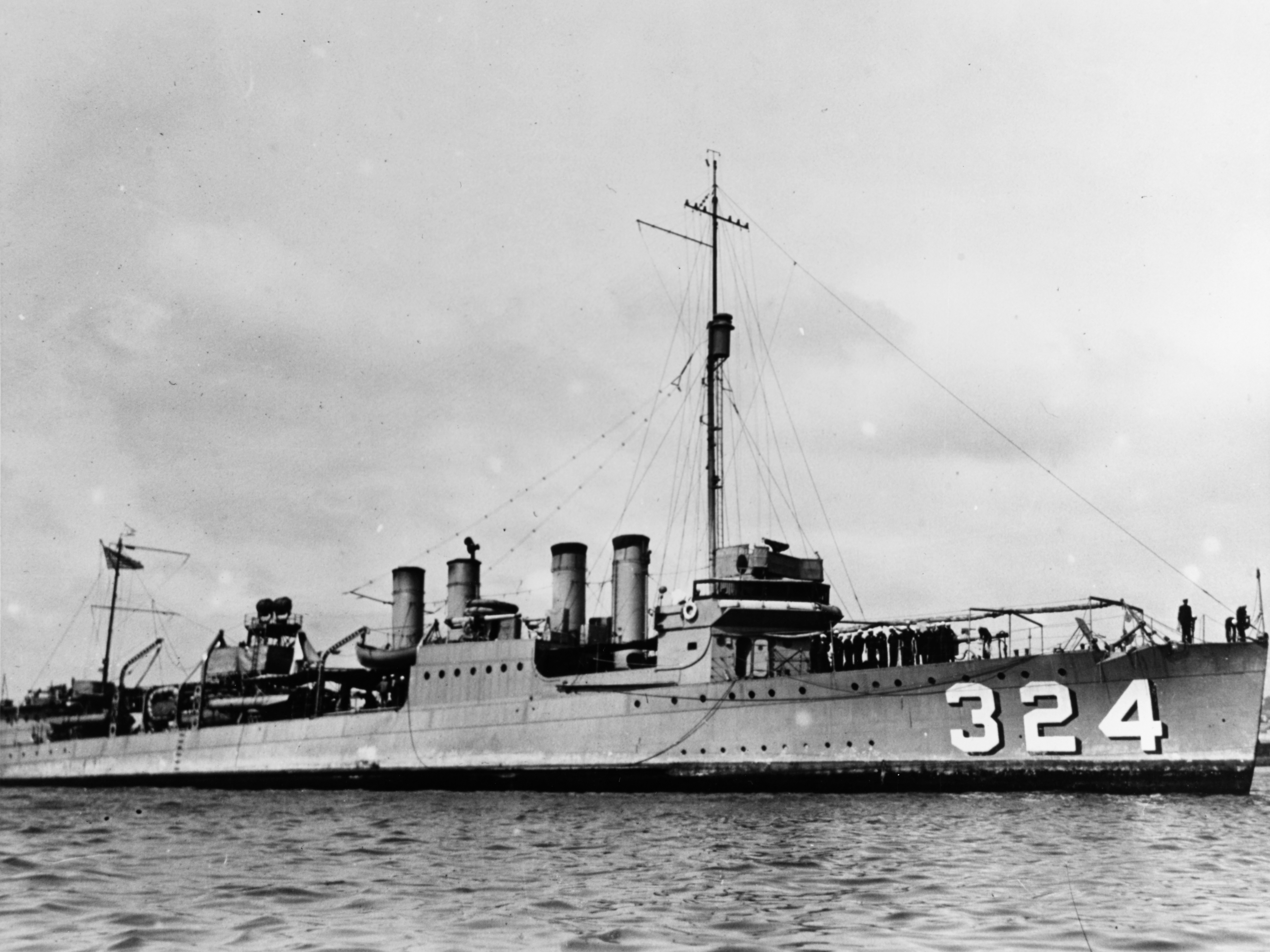

History

United States
- Namesake: Robert Smith
- Builder: Bethlehem Shipbuilding Corporation, Union Iron Works, San Francisco
- Laid down: 13 May 1919
- Launched: 19 September 1919
- Commissioned: 17 March 1921
- Decommissioned: 1 March 1930
- Stricken: 12 July 1930
- Fate: Sold for scrap, 10 June 1931

General characteristics
- Class & type: Clemson-class destroyer
- Displacement: 1,215 tons
- Length: 314 feet 4 inches (95.81 m)
- Beam: 31 feet 8 inches (9.65 m)
- Draft: 9 feet 10 inches (3.00 m)
- Propulsion: 26,500 shp (20 MW); geared turbines, 2 screws
- Speed: 35 knots (65 km/h)
- Range: 4,900 nmi (9,100 km); @ 15 kt
- Complement: 130 officers and enlisted
- Armament: 4 × 4 in (102 mm)/50 guns, 1 × 3 in (76 mm)/25 gun, 12 × 21 inch (533 mm) torpedo tubes

USS Robert Smith (DD-324) was a Clemson-class destroyer in service with the United States Navy from 1921 to 1930. She was scrapped in 1931.

== History ==
Robert Smith was named for Robert Smith (1757–1842), a member of the U.S. President James Madison's cabinet. She was launched 19 September 1919 at Bethlehem Shipbuilding Corporation, San Francisco, California; sponsored by Miss Jane Cooper; and commissioned 17 March 1921.

Departing San Francisco 5 April 1921, Robert Smith headed for her homeport, San Diego, California, to commence operations as flagship, Division 45, 2nd Destroyer Flotilla, U.S. Pacific Fleet. The destroyer cruised along the west coast of the United States and Mexico with the Battle Force, Pacific Fleet, into 1925, assigned to Destroyer Division 35 from September 1922. She conducted extensive gunnery, torpedo, and practice exercises, undergoing annual overhauls at Mare Island Navy Yard. The ship departed Mare Island 19 May 1925 for a cruise with units of the Battle Force. After taking part in maneuvers off Lahaina Roads, Robert Smith departed Pearl Harbor 1 July for Pago Pago, Samoa; Melbourne, Australia; Lyttelton and Wellington, New Zealand; and Tutuila, Samoa, returning to Pearl Harbor on 18 September.

Back at San Diego 26 September 1925, Robert Smith resumed her schedule of duties as a unit assigned to the Destroyer Force, Pacific Fleet. She transited the Panama Canal in April 1927, steaming north to Tompkinsville, New York, before returning south to operate in Panamanian waters during July. Robert Smith cruised along the southern California coast subsequently into 1928, deploying to the Hawaiian Islands in May 1928 and again in July. Operating into 1929 in Mexican and Californian waters, Robert Smith returned to San Diego 28 August 1929 for inactivation.

== Fate ==
Decommissioned 1 March 1930 at San Diego, Robert Smith was towed to Mare Island Navy Yard 4 April 1930. Struck from the Navy list 12 July 1930 and dismantled, Robert Smith's materials were sold 10 June 1931 for scrapping in accordance with the provisions of the London Treaty for the limitation and reduction of naval armament.

As of 2005, no other ships in the United States Navy have been named Robert Smith.

== See also ==
See USS Smith for other ships of this name.
