= USS Galena =

Three ships in the United States Navy have been named USS Galena. They were named for various communities that, in turn, were named for a native lead sulfide, the chief ore of lead. Cities, towns, and villages with the name exist in Kansas, Illinois, Maryland, Missouri, Ohio, and Alaska.

- USS Galena (1862), was a steamship during the American Civil War.
- USS Galena (1880), a steamship, was commissioned in 1880 and decommissioned in 1890.
- USS Galena (PC-1136), a patrol boat, was commissioned in 1943 and decommissioned in 1946.
