= Charles Kenyon (Medal of Honor) =

American fireman

Charles Kenyon (born 1840) was an American recipient of the Medal of Honor who received the award for his actions during the American Civil War whilst serving with the Union Navy.

== Biography ==
Kenyon was born in Marcy, Oneida County, New York in 1840. He served as a fireman aboard the USS Galena during the American Civil War. He earned his medal in action on the James River, Virginia when his ship attacked Drewry's Bluff on May 15, 1862, as part of the Battle of Drewry's Bluff. His medal was issued on April 3, 1863. Kenyon's date of death and burial location is unknown.

== Medal of Honor Citation ==
For extraordinary heroism in action, serving as Fireman on board the USS Galena in the attack upon Drewry's Bluff, 15 May 1862. Severely burned while extricating a priming wire which had become bent and fixed in the bow gun while his ship underwent terrific shelling from the enemy, Kenyon hastily dressed his hands with cotton waste and oil and courageously returned to his gun while enemy sharpshooters in rifle pits along the banks continued to direct their fire at the men at the guns.
