= USS Smith =

USS Smith may refer to one of these United States Navy ships

- USS Smith (DD-17), the lead ship of the Smith class of destroyers; launched 1909; decommissioned 1919; scrapped 1921
- USS Smith (DD-378), a Mahan-class destroyer, launched 1936; decommissioned 1946; sold 1947

== See also ==
- USS Smith Thompson
- USS Dan Smith
- USS Isaac Smith
- USS Robert Smith
