= Thomas Jordan (Medal of Honor) =

Thomas H. Jordan
- Born: April 12, 1840; Portsmouth, Virginia, US
- Died: July 17, 1930 (aged 90)
- Burial place: Mount Olivet Cemetery
- Military career
- Allegiance: United States
- Branch: United States Navy
- Rank: Quartermaster
- Unit: USS Galena
- Conflicts: American Civil War • Battle of Mobile Bay
- Awards: Medal of Honor

Thomas H. Jordan (April 12, 1840 – July 17, 1930) was a Union Navy sailor in the American Civil War and a recipient of the U.S. military's highest decoration, the Medal of Honor, for his actions at the Battle of Mobile Bay.

== Background ==
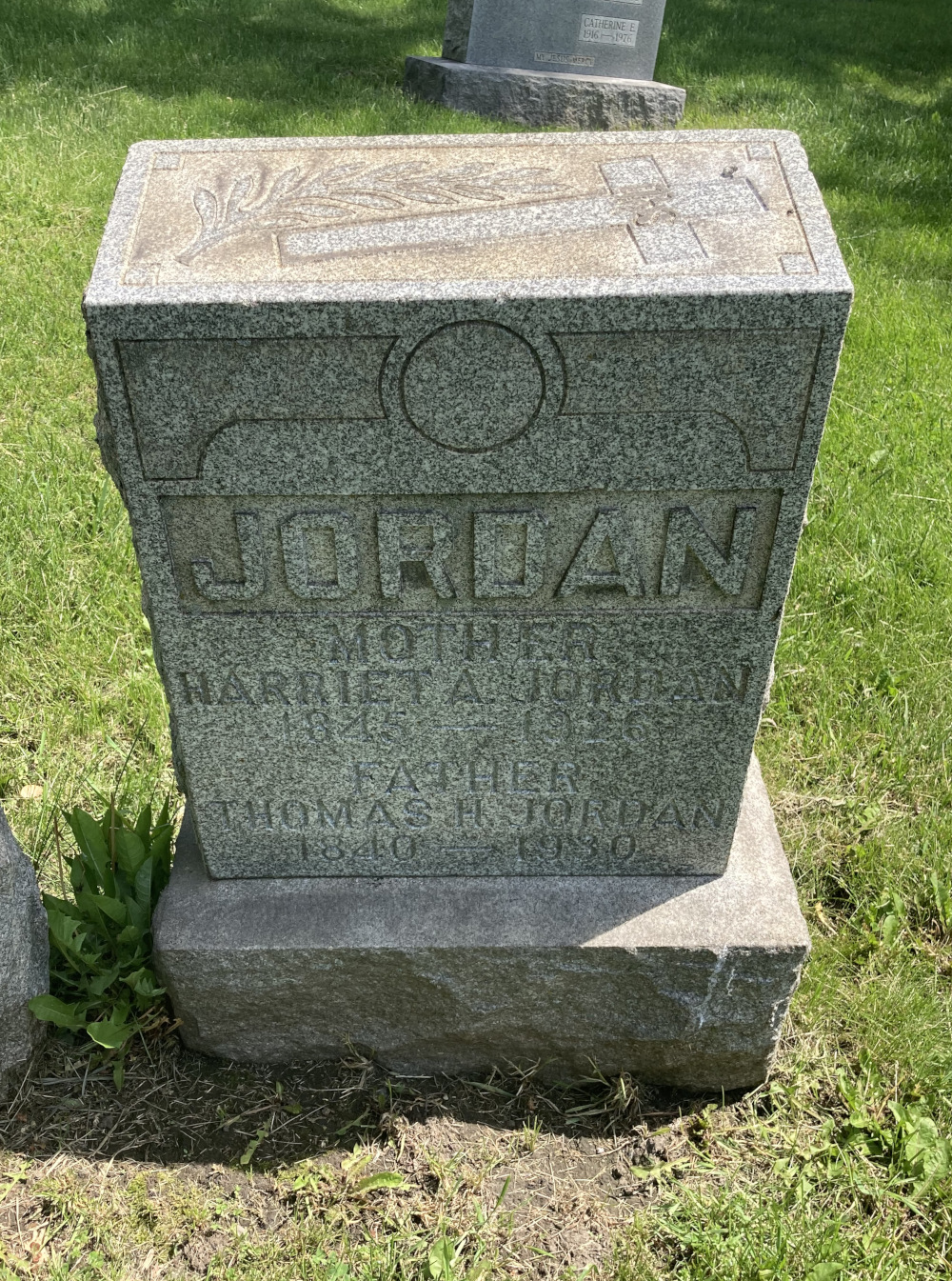
Jordan's grave at Mount Olivet Cemetery

Born on April 12, 1840, in Portsmouth, Virginia, Jordan was living in Baltimore, Maryland, when he joined the Navy. He served during the Civil War as a quartermaster on the USS Galena. At the Battle of Mobile Bay on August 5, 1864, he "performed his duties with skill and courage" as his ship assisted the disabled USS Oneida while under heavy fire. For this action, he was awarded the Medal of Honor a year later on June 22, 1865.

Jordan's official Medal of Honor citation reads:

On board the U.S.S. Galena during the attack on enemy forts at Mobile Bay, 5 August 1864. Securely lashed to the side of the Oneida which had suffered the loss of her steering apparatus and an explosion of her boiler from enemy fire, the Galena aided the stricken vessel past the enemy forts to safety. Despite heavy damage to his ship from raking enemy fire, Jordan performed his duties with skill and courage throughout the action.

Jordan died on July 17, 1930, at age 90 and was buried at Mount Olivet Cemetery in Chicago, Illinois.
