= William Gardner (sailor) =

American Civil War sailor and Medal of Honor recipient

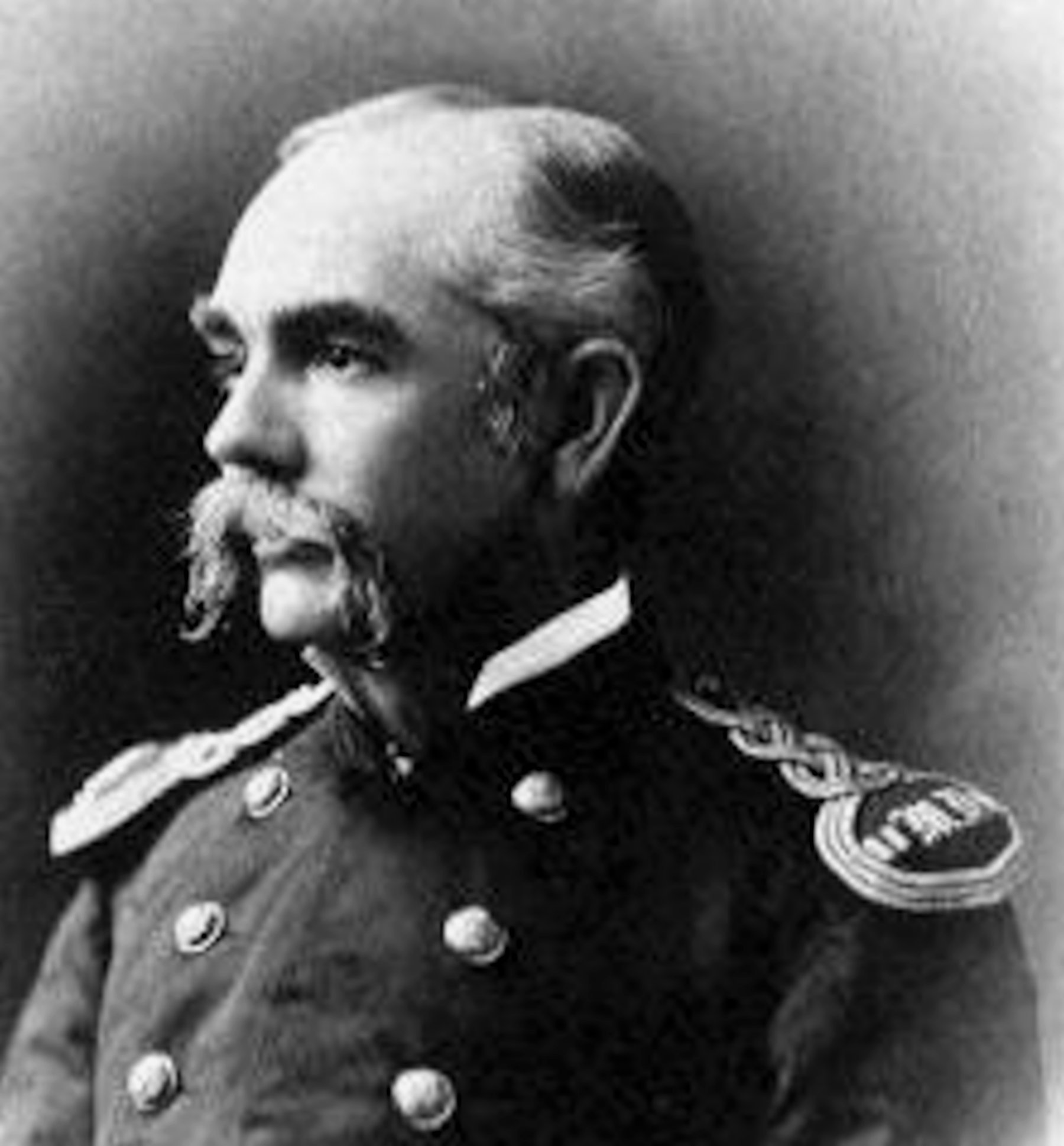
- Medal of Honor winner William Gardner
- Born: c. 1832; Ireland
- Military career
- Allegiance: United States of America
- Branch: United States Navy
- Rank: Ship's Cook
- Unit: (United States Navy) USS Galena
- Conflicts: American Civil War • Battle of Mobile Bay
- Awards: Medal of Honor

William Gardner (born c. 1832, date of death unknown) was a Union Navy sailor in the American Civil War and a recipient of the U.S. military's highest decoration, the Medal of Honor, for his actions at the Battle of Mobile Bay.

== Background ==
Born in about 1832 in Ireland, Gardner immigrated to the United States and was living in New York when he joined the U.S. Navy. He served during the Civil War as a seaman on the USS Galena. At the Battle of Mobile Bay on August 5, 1864, he "behaved with conspicuous coolness" despite heavy fire. For this action, he was awarded the Medal of Honor four months later, on December 31, 1864. He later obtained the rank of ship's cook.

Gardner's official Medal of Honor citation reads:

As seaman on board the U.S.S. Galena in the engagement at Mobile Bay, 5 August 1864. Serving gallantly during this fierce battle which resulted in the capture of the rebel ram Tennessee and the damaging of Fort Morgan. Gardner behaved with conspicuous coolness under the fire of the enemy.
