= Charles Deakin =

American Medal of Honor recipient

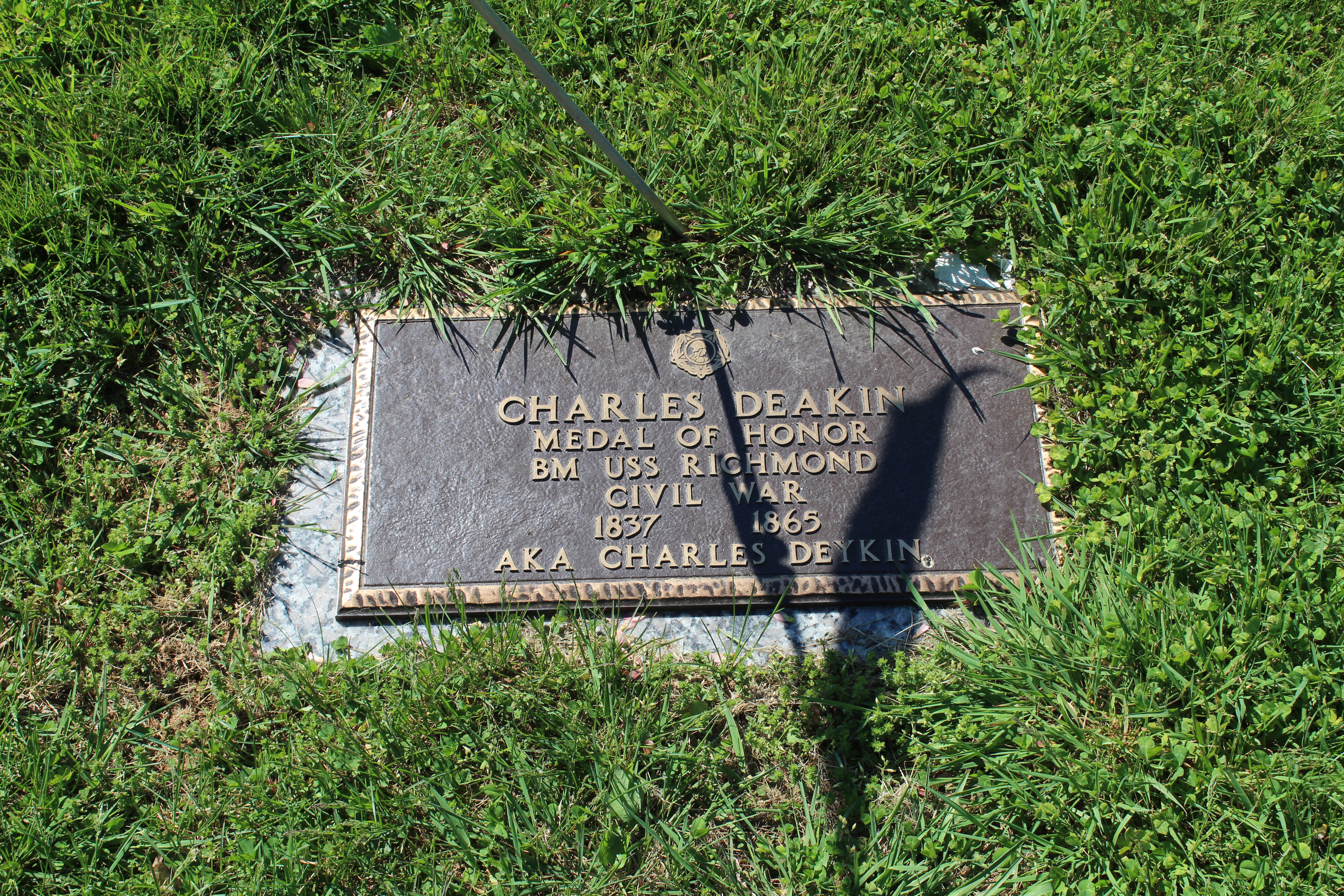
- Charles Deakin Memorial Marker at Rosedale Cemetery
- Born: 1837; New York City, US
- Died: October 4, 1865 (aged 27–28); Philadelphia, Pennsylvania, US
- Burial place: Lafayette Cemetery, Philadelphia, Pennsylvania; Rosedale Memorial Park Cemetery, Bensalem, Pennsylvania
- Military career
- Allegiance: United States; Union
- Branch: US Army; Union Navy
- Rank: Boatswain's Mate
- Unit: USS Richmond
- Conflicts: American Civil War • Battle of Forts Jackson and St. Philip • Battle of Mobile Bay
- Awards: Medal of Honor

Charles Deakin (1837 – October 4, 1865), born Charles Deykin, was a Union Navy sailor in the American Civil War and a recipient of the U.S. military's highest decoration, the Medal of Honor, for his actions at the Battle of Mobile Bay.

== Military service ==
Born in 1837 in New York City, Deakin was living in Philadelphia when he joined the Navy. He served during the Civil War as a boatswain's mate and gun captain on the USS Richmond. In April 1862, he took part in the Battle of Forts Jackson and St. Philip in Louisiana. At the Battle of Mobile Bay on August 5, 1864, he "fought his gun with skill and courage" despite heavy fire. For this action, he was awarded the Medal of Honor four months later, on December 31, 1864.

== Medal of Honor citation ==
Rank and organization: Boatswain's Mate, U.S. Navy. Accredited to: Pennsylvania. G.O. No.: 45, 31 December 1864.

Deakin's official Medal of Honor citation reads:

As captain of a gun on board the U.S.S. Richmond during action against rebel forts and gunboats and with the ram Tennessee in Mobile Bay, 5 August 1864. Despite damage to his ship and the loss of several men on board as enemy fire raked her decks, Deakin fought his gun with skill and courage throughout a furious 2-hour battle which resulted in the surrender of the rebel ram Tennessee and in the damaging and destruction of batteries at Fort Morgan. He also participated in the actions at Forts Jackson and St. Philip.

== Death and burial ==
Medal of Honor recipient Charles Deakin died October 4, 1865, from a hemorrhage of the lungs. He died at the residence of Margaret Densmore, who was the widow of Medal of Honor recipient Chief Boatswain's Mate William Densmore. Deakin was buried October 6, 1865, at the now defunct Lafayette Cemetery in Philadelphia. In 1947, the interments of Lafayette Cemetery were removed to Evergreen Memorial Park in Bensalem, Pennsylvania. Evergreen Memorial Park went out of business and became part of Rosedale Cemetery in 1960.

Deakin's death notice in the October 6, 1865 Philadelphia Inquirer newspaper read:

DEYKIN - On the 4th instant, CHAS. DEYKIN, late Boatswain's Mate of the United States sloop-of-war Richmond, in the 33rd year of his age. The relatives, friends and shipmates are respectfully invited to attend his funeral, from the residence of Mrs. Margaret Densmore, No. 755 Swanson street, this (Friday) afternoon, at 4 o'clock.
