= USS Galena (1862) =

American military ship

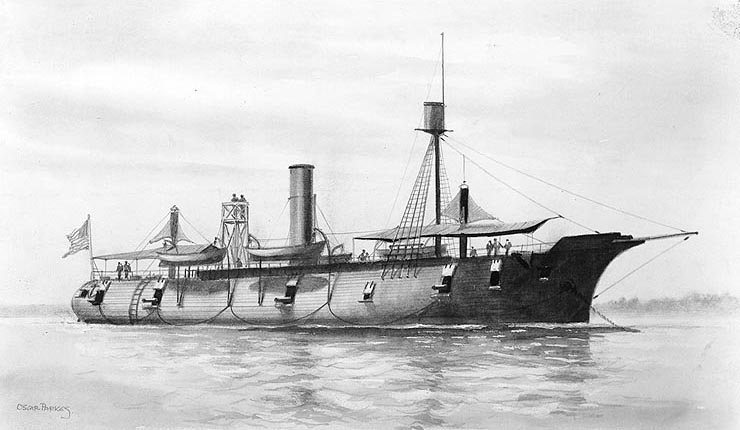
- A drawing of Galena cleared for action in 1862

History

United States
- Name: USS Galena
- Namesake: Galena, Illinois
- Ordered: 16 September 1861
- Builder: Maxson, Fish & Co., Mystic, Connecticut
- Laid down: 1861
- Launched: 14 February 1862
- Commissioned: 21 April 1862
- Decommissioned: 17 June 1865
- Stricken: 1870
- Fate: Scrapped, 1872

General characteristics
- Type: Ironclad screw steamer
- Displacement: 950 long tons (965 t)
- Tons burthen: 738 (bm)
- Length: 210 ft (64 m) (o/a)
- Beam: 36 ft (11 m)
- Draft: 11 ft (3.4 m)
- Depth of hold: 12 ft 8 in (3.86 m)
- Installed power: 800 ihp (600 kW); 2 Boilers
- Propulsion: 1 Shaft; 1 Vibrating lever-steam engine
- Sail plan: Schooner rig
- Speed: 8 knots (15 km/h; 9.2 mph)
- Complement: 164 officers and enlisted
- Armament: 4 × 9 in (230 mm) Smoothbore Dahlgren guns; 2 × 100-pounder Parrott rifles
- Armor: 3.12 inches (79 mm)

USS Galena was a wooden-hulled broadside ironclad built for the United States Navy during the American Civil War. The ship was initially assigned to the North Atlantic Blockading Squadron and supported Union forces during the Peninsula Campaign in 1862. She was damaged during the Battle of Drewry's Bluff because her armor was too thin to prevent Confederate shots from the guns of Fort Darling from penetrating her hull. Widely regarded as a failure, Galena was reconstructed without most of her armor in 1863 and transferred to the West Gulf Blockading Squadron in 1864. The ship participated in the Battle of Mobile Bay and the subsequent Siege of Fort Morgan in August. She was briefly transferred to the East Gulf Blockading Squadron in September before she was sent to Philadelphia, Pennsylvania for repairs in November.

Repairs were completed in March 1865 and Galena rejoined the North Atlantic Blockading Squadron in Hampton Roads the following month. After the end of the war, the ship was decommissioned at Portsmouth, New Hampshire in June. She was transferred to Hampton Roads in 1869, condemned in 1870, and broken up for scrap in 1872.

== Background ==
After the United States received word of the construction of the Confederate casemate ironclad, CSS Virginia, Congress appropriated $1.5 million on 3 August to build one or more armored steamships. It also ordered the creation of a board to inquire into armored ships. The U.S. Navy advertised for proposals for "iron-clad steam vessels of war" on 7 August and Gideon Welles, the Secretary of the Navy, appointed the three members of the Ironclad Board the following day. Their task was to "examine plans for the completion of iron-clad vessels".

Well before this date, Cornelius Bushnell had commissioned a design for an armored sloop from naval architect Samuel H. Pook in June for $1,500 anticipating an order from the Union Navy to counter the Confederate ironclad already known to be under construction. Bushnell expected that order because his bid, at a higher cost, for building the steam Unadilla-class gunboat Owasco had already been accepted provided that he subcontract the construction to Charles Mallory & Sons Shipyard of Mystic, Connecticut. In exchange, the Navy asked if Bushnell could give a price on an armored gunboat. He could and subcontracted the building of his design to Maxson, Fish & Co., also of Mystic, on 20 July, the day after a bill to authorize construction of a number of armored ships was introduced in the Senate. The building of the Galena's wooden hull began two days later.

The Ironclad Board initially accepted two of the sixteen designs submitted in early September, the armored frigate that became USS New Ironsides and Bushnell's design. The board required a guarantee from Bushnell that his ship would float despite the weight of its armor and he needed to have his design reviewed by a naval constructor to that end. Cornelius H. DeLamater recommended that Bushnell consult with his friend John Ericsson. The two first met on 9 September and again on the following day, after Ericsson had time to evaluate Galena's design and give his guarantee. During this second meeting Ericsson showed Bushnell his own design, the future USS Monitor. Bushnell got Ericsson's permission to show the model of his design to Welles and the latter told Bushnell to show it to the board. Despite a preliminary rejection, the board accepted Ericsson's proposal on 16 September after he explained his design in person the previous day.

The three ironclad ships differed substantially in design and degree of risk. The Monitor was the most innovative design by virtue of its low freeboard, shallow-draft iron hull, and total dependence on steam power. The riskiest element of its design was its rotating gun turret, something that had not previously been tested by any navy. (Note: British trials of a turret designed by Cowper Coles on board the floating battery HMS Trusty began the same month.) Ericsson's guarantee of delivery in 100 days proved to be decisive in choosing his design despite the risk involved. The wooden-hulled Galena's most novel feature was her armor of interlocking iron rails. New Ironsides was much influenced by the French ironclad Gloire and was the most conservative design of the three, which copied many of the features of the French ship.

== Design and description ==
Galena's original design, dated 28 June, was for a schooner-rigged corvette with three masts, 162 feet (49.4 m) long at the waterline with a beam of 32 feet (9.8 m), a depth of hold of 10 feet 8 inches (3.3 m) and an estimated displacement of 800 long tons (813 t). The ship's sides were protected by wrought iron plates 2.5 inches (64 mm) thick, backed by 1.5 inches (38 mm) of india rubber and the 18-inch (460 mm) side of the hull. The ship's deck consisted of armor 1.25 inches (32 mm). A revised design was submitted to the Ironclad Board, for which a contract was awarded on 28 September, in which the sloop was enlarged, probably because it was uncertain if the original design could support the proposed armor's weight.

As built, Galena was 180 feet (54.9 m) long between perpendiculars and 210 feet (64.0 m) long overall. She had a beam of 36 feet (11.0 m), a depth of hold of 12 feet 8 inches (3.9 m), and a draft of 11 feet (3.4 m). The ship displaced 950 long tons (965 t) and had 738 tons burthen. The number of masts was reduced to two and the amount of tumblehome greatly increased. Her crew numbered 150 officers and enlisted men. On her only ocean voyage in her original configuration, Galena rolled heavily.

While under construction, the armor scheme was modified. The rubber backing was replaced by an additional 5/8 inch (16 mm) of iron although Commodore Joseph Smith, Chief of the Bureau of Yards and Docks and Pook were uncertain if the ship could support this weight. To reduce the weight several alternatives were proposed. One proposal was to reduce the thickness of the protection to 1/2 inch (13 mm) for a distance from 20 feet (6.1 m) from the bow and stern and the other was to reduce the armor's thickness above the sills of the gun ports to 2 inches (51 mm) and the deck armor's thickness to 1/2-inch over 2 1/2 inches of wood. It is unknown exactly how the situation was resolved, but one report on 31 March 1862 suggests that the two proposals were combined as it said that the armor was two inches thick above the gun ports, except around the stern where it was 1/2-inch thick.

Galena was powered by a single-cylinder horizontal Ericsson vibrating-lever steam engine, which drove one propeller. The 800-indicated-horsepower (600 kW) engine used steam generated by two boilers and gave the ship a top speed of 8 knots (15 km/h; 9.2 mph). It had a bore of 48 inches (1,219 mm) and a stroke of 36 inches (914 mm). During her trip to Hampton Roads after commissioning, the ship reached a speed of 7–8 knots (13–15 km/h; 8.1–9.2 mph) using her sails.

The ship was armed with two 6.4-inch (163 mm), 100-pounder Parrott rifles in pivot mounts fore and aft and four 9-inch (229 mm) smoothbore Dahlgren guns. Each nine-inch gun weighed approximately 9,000 pounds (4,100 kg). They could fire a 70–90-pound (31.8–40.8 kg) shell to a range of 3,450 yards (3,150 m) at an elevation of 15°. The muzzle-loading Parrott rifles fired a 70–100-pound (31.8–45.4 kg) shell and had a maximum range of approximately 2,250 yards (2,060 m). The 20-caliber guns weighed about 9,800 pounds (4,400 kg) each.

== Career ==
Galena's keel was laid down by Maxson, Fish & Co. in 1861 and she was launched on 14 February 1862. The ship was commissioned on 21 April 1862 with Commander Alfred Taylor in command. Galena arrived in Hampton Roads on 24 April, after having suffered several engine breakdowns en route, and was assigned to Flag Officer L.M. Goldsborough's North Atlantic Blockading Squadron. Commander John Rodgers relieved Taylor the same day. When Goldsborough inspected the ship shortly after her arrival he ordered that her spars be cut away and the nuts on the inside of her hull to be covered with sheet iron to prevent them from breaking loose when the ship was hit.

Galena prepared for action on 4 and 7 May when the ironclad Virginia sortied into Hampton Roads, but the Virginia did not attack. On 8 May, the ship, together with the gunboats Port Royal and Aroostook, sailed up the James River with orders to cooperate with Major General George B. McClellan's Army in Peninsula Campaign and harass retreating Confederate forces. The ships silenced one battery and ran past another covering the river without damage before Galena ran aground later that day. She was not damaged, although she required a day and a half of work before she was freed. Rodgers' ships were reinforced by the ironclads Monitor and Naugatuck on 12 May and they reached City Point the following day.

=== Battle of Drewry's Bluff ===
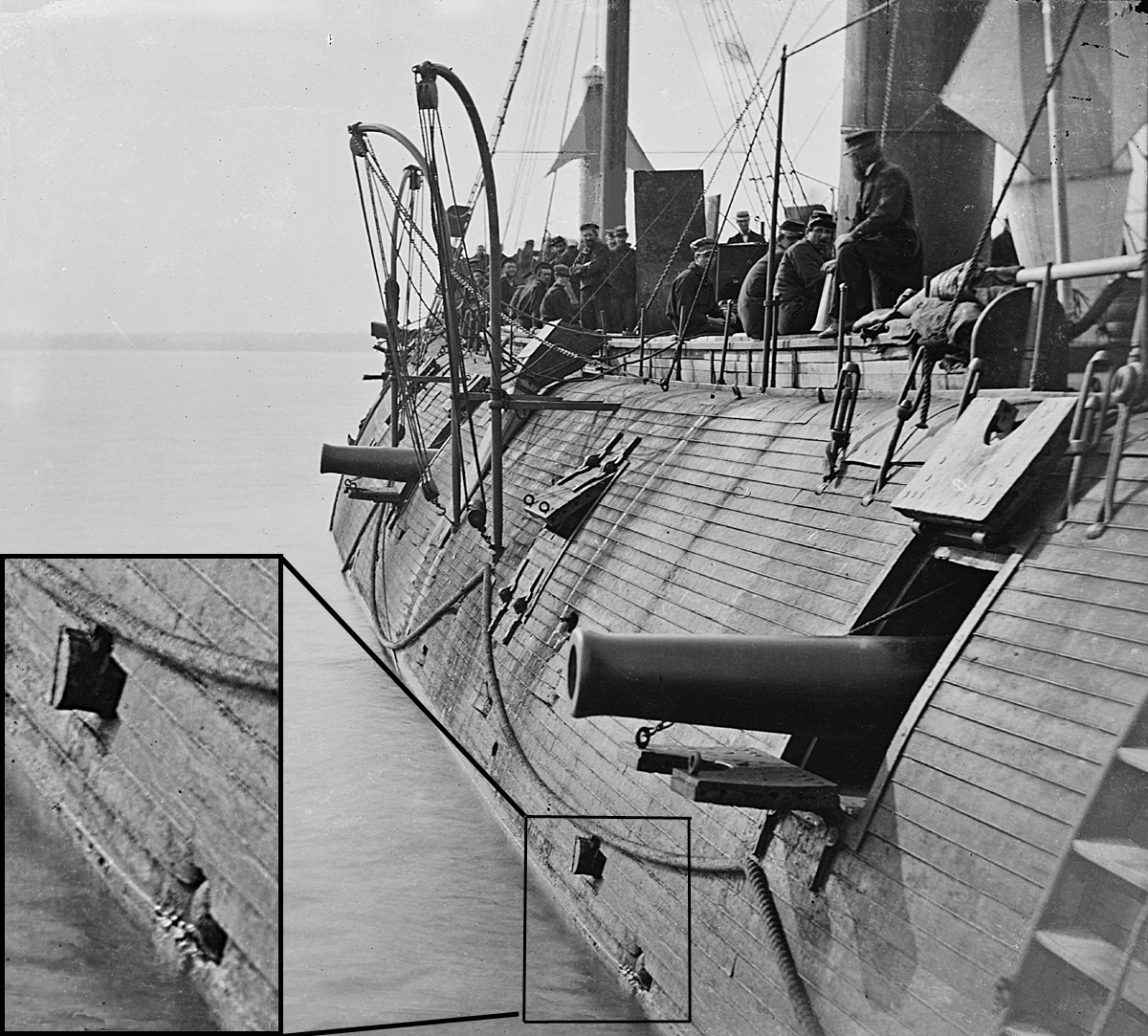
Galena on 15 May 1862, showing some battle damage

On the morning of 15 May, Galena led her squadron up to Drewry's Bluff, about 8 miles (13 km) from Richmond, where the Confederates had blocked the river and placed a battery on the 90-foot (27 m) bluff to cover the obstacles. Galena anchored some 600 yards (550 m) from the bluff and opened fire at 07:45, while the wooden ships remained further downriver. Monitor attempted to fire on the battery as well, but her guns could not elevate enough to reach it. Galena engaged the Confederate position for over three hours, until her ammunition was nearly exhausted. Her fire was largely ineffective, although her shells did manage to kill seven and wound eight members of the battery. In return, the ship was hit an estimated 44 times on her port side, of which 13 hits penetrated her armor and she had three large holes punched through her spar deck. She suffered 13 crewmen killed and a further 11 wounded. In a letter to his wife, Rodgers said that "her sides look as though she had an attack of smallpox". Two sailors and one marine aboard Galena were awarded the Medal of Honor for their actions during the battle: Fireman Charles Kenyon, Quartermaster Jeremiah Regan, and Corporal John F. Mackie. Mackie was the first member of the U.S. Marine Corps to receive the medal.

Galena remained on the James River after the battle and returned to City Point. She shelled Confederate soldiers along the river banks and bombarded City Point to cover a landing force which set fire to the depots. On 27 June, Major General McClellan came aboard the ship to locate a new camp which was later established near Harrison's Landing. On 30 June, McClellan was compelled to withdraw down the James, covered by gunfire from Galena and the other gunboats. They continued to support his forces until they were transferred to Northern Virginia. Galena patrolled the river to defend transports and supply ships against Confederate raids and ambushes until she was detached from the James River Flotilla in September 1862 Galena and Monitor were retained at Newport News, Virginia, in case the Confederate ironclads building at Richmond sortied into Hampton Roads.

Galena departed Hampton Roads on 19 May 1863 and arrived at Philadelphia, Pennsylvania, two days later, where she was decommissioned for repairs and reconstruction. Most of her ineffective armor was removed, except around the engines and boilers; her armament was increased to eight nine-inch Dahlgren guns and a single 100-pounder Parrot rifle, and she was rebuilt as a ship-rigged sloop with three masts.

Recommissioned on 15 February 1864, Galena, now under the command of Lieutenant Commander C. H. Wells, sailed on 18 February for the Gulf of Mexico and the West Gulf Blockading Squadron. The ship became icebound at New Castle, Delaware, until she was towed out to sea by an ice boat, and was forced to put into port for repairs. She departed Norfolk on 10 May and arrived at Pensacola, Florida on 20 May for blockade duty off Mobile, Alabama, during which she shelled Fort Morgan and fired upon various blockade runners as they attempted to evade the blockade.

=== Battle of Mobile Bay ===
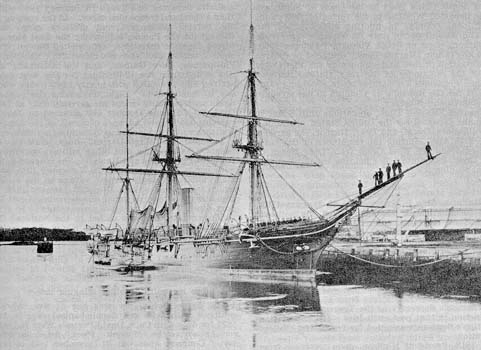
Galena, after 1864 refit as a wooden sloop

Rear Admiral David Farragut, commander of the West Gulf Blockading Squadron, was to split his ships into two columns. The four monitors would comprise the starboard column, closest to Ft. Morgan, and their mission was to bombard the fort while the wooden ships in the other column passed by, and to sink the ironclad ram CSS Tennessee. Once past the fort the wooden ships were to prevent the escape of the Confederate wooden gunboats to Mobile. To ensure that his wooden ships could get past Ft. Morgan, Farragut ordered that they be lashed together in pairs so that one ship could pull the other if the Confederates succeeded in knocking out its boilers or engines.

Galena was tied to the port side of the larger sloop Oneida and the pair were the last ships in the port column when the battle began on the morning of 5 August. While passing the fort, Oneida had her starboard boiler disabled by a shell hit and her crew was attempting to reroute her steam to both engines when she was engaged by Tennessee at a range of 200 yards (180 m). The ironclad only managed to fire three shots that did little damage. Galena was struck six times while passing the fort with little damage, although her rigging was badly cut up. Two crewmen were wounded and another died of his wounds. Four of Galena's sailors were awarded the Medal of Honor for their actions during the battle: Seaman William Gardner, Quartermaster Thomas Jordan, Quartermaster Edward S. Martin, and Coxswain Edward B. Young.

Galena intermittently bombarded Fort Morgan until it surrendered on 23 August and sailed from Mobile Bay on 31 August to temporarily serve as a part of the East Gulf Blockading Squadron at Key West, Florida. The transfer was made permanent on 24 September and she was ordered to the Philadelphia Navy Yard for repair a month later. The ship did not arrive until 4 November and repairs did not begin until 22 November. Galena was recommissioned on 29 March 1865 and was reassigned to the North Atlantic Blockading Squadron. She reached Newport News on 2 April where the ship patrolled the mouth of the Nansemond River and in the James River until her departure on 6 June for Portsmouth, New Hampshire.

Galena was decommissioned there on 17 June until she was recommissioned on 9 April 1869 for transfer to back to Hampton Roads, where she was again decommissioned on 2 June. Condemned by survey in 1870, Galena was broken up in 1872 at the Norfolk Navy Yard.
