= Ironclad Board =

The Ironclad Board was an advisory board established by the Union in 1861 in response to the construction of the CSS Virginia by the Confederacy during the US Civil War. The primary goal of the Ironclad Board was to develop more battle-worthy "ironclad" ships, leading to the construction a number of innovative designs, including the USS Monitor. The board consisted of senior naval officers Commodore Joseph Smith, Commodore Hiram Paulding, Commander Charles H. Davis and Assistant Secretary of the Navy Gustavus Fox

== History ==
On August 7, 1861, the Union Navy advertised for proposals for "iron-clad steam vessels of war," of iron or of a combination of wood and iron, to draw from ten to sixteen feet of water. The next day, Secretary of the Navy Gideon Welles chose a "board" to look over the proposals he expected to get. The "Ironclad Board" consisted of Commodores Joseph Smith and Hiram Paulding, Commander Charles H. Davis, and Assistant Secretary of the Navy Gustavus Fox.

== Challenges ==
The Ironclad Board faced many challenges of its own since ironclad technology was still very new. The French and British had built effective ironclad ships, but European ironclads took a long time to construct and drew far too much water to be useful off the Southern coast. The Ironclad Board had to get rid of the proposals the Navy received to find a shallow-draft design that would be successful and could be built quickly.

== Design Ideas ==
The board received seventeen proposals of different form, practicality, and degree of detail, ranging from William Norris's ninety-ton steam gunboat to Edward S. Renwick's 6,520-ton giant. The board recommended that Welles build three of the proposed ships. One of the designs it accepted, which became the USS Galena, was proposed by Cornelius S. Bushnell. The Galena had a traditional hull and broadside battery. Even with a conventional sailing rig, the proposal was bizarre, and the board required Bushnell to guarantee the ship's ability to float and its stability.

A second design, even more abnormal, was John Ericsson's single-turreted, low-freeboard vessel. Ericsson's design had the shallowest draft and shortest estimated construction time, but against it were its extremely low freeboard, turret-mounted guns, and total reliance on steam power. The board took a flyer on Ericsson, and quick construction was the most important thing in Welles's decision to build the Monitor.

Board members saw what the Union navy needed instantly—"vessels invulnerable to shot, of light draught of water"—but other factors clearly affected their deliberations. The board, therefore, took out insurance by choosing as its third vessel a fully rigged, high-freeboard ship with solid wrought-iron armor and a broadside battery.

The prevailing theme of the Union ironclad program was urgency, but urgency compounded by technological confusion. Increasing production of a proven design would have been difficult enough, without the handicap of having to design, test, and build it at the same time.

== Design Flaws & Worries ==
The board also worried about the ability of the chosen designs to fight in the open ocean. The Navy expected the Confederates to use Virginia in Hampton Roads, but beyond that instant goal, their intentions seemed less clear. Steadily multiplying rumors had the Confederate ironclad ascending the Potomac River to attack Washington, while others feared she would instead put to sea to attack cities on the coast such as New York.
