= Robert Smith (Maryland politician) =

American politician (1757–1842)

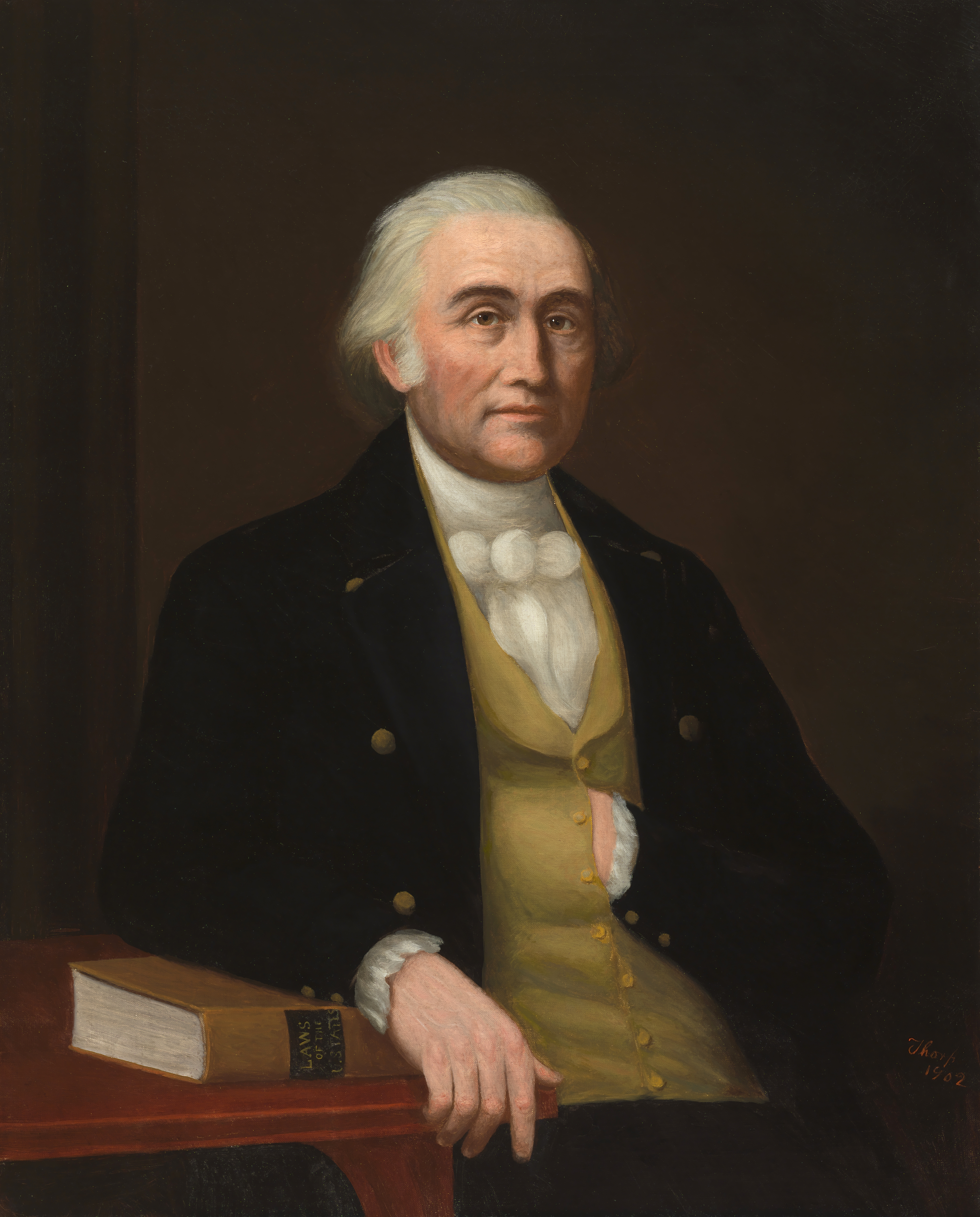
- Posthumous portrait by Freeman Thorp, c. 1902

6th United States Secretary of State
- In office March 6, 1809 – April 1, 1811
- President: James Madison
- Preceded by: James Madison
- Succeeded by: James Monroe

United States Attorney General Acting
- In office March 2, 1805 – August 7, 1805
- President: Thomas Jefferson
- Preceded by: Levi Lincoln
- Succeeded by: John Breckinridge

2nd United States Secretary of the Navy
- In office July 27, 1801 – March 4, 1809
- President: Thomas Jefferson
- Preceded by: Benjamin Stoddert
- Succeeded by: Paul Hamilton

Baltimore City Council
- In office 1798–1800

Maryland House of Delegates
- In office 1796–1800

Maryland State Senate
- In office 1793–1795

Personal details
- Born: November 3, 1757 Lancaster, Pennsylvania, British America
- Died: November 26, 1842 (aged 85) Baltimore, Maryland, U.S.
- Party: Democratic-Republican
- Spouse: Margaret Smith
- Education: College of New Jersey (BA)

Military service
- Allegiance: United States
- Branch/service: Continental Army
- Rank: Private
- Battles/wars: American Revolutionary War

Robert Smith (November 3, 1757 – November 26, 1842) was an American politician, diplomat, and admiralty lawyer. He served as the second United States Secretary of the Navy from 1801 to 1809 and the sixth United States Secretary of State from 1809 to 1811. He was the younger brother of Senator Samuel Smith.

Smith was a veteran of the American Revolutionary War and later graduated from Princeton University, then known as the College of New Jersey. As a respected lawyer, Smith became part of Baltimore's political elite, launching his political career under Thomas Jefferson and later James Madison.

After a forced resignation from the Cabinet in 1811, Smith served as president of the American Bible Society and the Maryland Agriculture Society. Retired from public office, Smith died in 1842.

== Early life ==
Smith was born in Lancaster, Province of Pennsylvania. During the American Revolutionary War, Smith enlisted as a private in the Continental Army, later participating in the Battle of Brandywine.

=== Legal practice ===
He graduated from Princeton in 1781 and was admitted to the Maryland Bar. In private practice, Smith specialized in admiralty law. Smith flourished as a maritime lawyer, establishing the "largest admiralty practice of his time."

== Political career ==
Smith was well-respected from his legal career. Due to his public profile, Smith was selected as an elector to the Electoral College representing Maryland during the 1788–89 United States presidential election.

=== Elected office ===
After Smith's entry to partisan politics, he was elected to the Maryland State Senate from 1793 to 1795 and to the Maryland House of Delegates from 1796 to 1800. While serving in the Maryland House, Smith was also elected to the Baltimore City Council in 1798.

=== Cabinet Secretary ===
As a legal expert in admiralty law, Thomas Jefferson appointed him as Secretary of the Navy in July 1801, after William Jones declined the position. On March 2, 1805, the Senate confirmed the appointments of Smith as United States Attorney General and Jacob Crowninshield as Secretary of the Navy. However, Crowninshield declined his appointment for health reasons, so Smith briefly served as both Attorney General and Secretary of the Navy.

Eventually, President Jefferson appointed John Breckinridge to replace Smith as Attorney General and Smith resumed his role as a full-time Secretary of the Navy.

Smith left the office of Secretary of the Navy at the end of President Jefferson's administration on March 4, 1809. President James Madison appointed Smith to serve as Secretary of State on March 6, 1809. In this position, Smith negotiated an agreement with British Minister David Erskine in an attempt to reconcile the two nations. However, Erskine failed to follow the instructions of Foreign Secretary George Canning, who demanded that the U.S. avoid trading with France during her war with Britain. Thus, the agreement failed, and Madison eventually forced Smith's resignation on April 1, 1811.

=== Policies ===
During his time as Secretary of State, Smith pursued an assertive policy to claim the Spanish-controlled West Florida. In October 1810, Smith lied to General Louis Marie Turreau, claiming the United States would not support rebellion in the territory. Later the same month, Smith received word from David Holmes that West Florida declared its independence. American forces subsequently invaded West Florida.

In personal correspondence, Smith pushed for an amendment to ban persons with foreign titles from serving in the New Hampshire legislature, though the amendment failed.

Resignation

Smith was closely allied with his brother, Maryland Senator Samuel Smith, and bitterly opposed Treasury Secretary Albert Gallatin. In March 1811, Gallatin threatened to resign if Madison didn't dismiss Smith.

Madison thought that Smith could be his own Secretary of State, but Smith so often pursued opposite policies that Madison finally demanded his resignation. In Madison's April 1811 "Memorandum on Robert Smith," the president offered a laundry list of Smith's shortcomings. Madison questioned Smith's loyalty; found Smith's diplomatic correspondence wanting, and noted that Smith had been indiscreet in conversations with the British and had opposed the administration's efforts to secure concessions from Britain and France by limiting trade.

Apparently, Smith was bewildered by these and other charges leveled by Madison and published an exoneration of himself, "Robert Smith's Address to the People of the United States," which was an attack on Madison's foreign policy. Madison offered Smith the post of Minister to Russia, which was currently held by John Quincy Adams. Smith considered the offer, but in the end, he refused the post.

== Personal life ==
Smith became the president of the not-yet-fully-organized American Bible Society in 1813. In 1818, he became the founding president of the Maryland Agriculture Society and afterwards retired to a more private life where he enjoyed his wealth.

Robert Smith died in Baltimore, Maryland, on November 26, 1842, aged 85.

== Death and legacy ==
The USS Robert Smith was named for him.

Political offices
Preceded by Benjamin Stoddert	United States Secretary of the Navy; 1801–1809	Succeeded by Paul Hamilton
Preceded by James Madison	U.S. Secretary of State; Served under: James Madison; 1809–1811	Succeeded by James Monroe
