= Joseph Smith (admiral) =

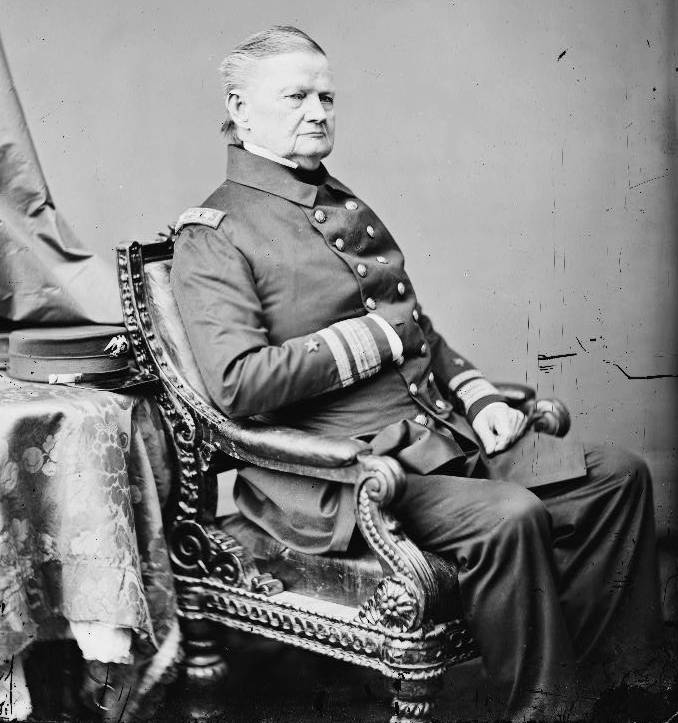
- Born: March 30, 1790; Boston, Massachusetts, U.S.
- Died: January 17, 1877 (aged 86); Washington, D.C., U.S.
- Burial place: Oak Hill Cemetery; Washington, D.C., U.S.
- Military career
- Allegiance: United States
- Branch: United States Navy
- Service years: 1809–1871
- Rank: Rear admiral
- Commands: USS Ohio; Mediterranean Squadron; Bureau of Yards and Docks
- Conflicts: War of 1812; Battle of Lake Champlain; Mexican–American War; American Civil War

Joseph Smith (March 30, 1790 – January 17, 1877) was a rear admiral of the United States Navy, who served during the War of 1812, the Mexican–American War, and the American Civil War.

== Biography ==
Smith was born in Boston, Massachusetts, and was raised in Hanover, Massachusetts, where he was raised around a maritime centered family. As the Smith family owned Smith's Shipyard from 1792 to 1819, the Smith family created a respected name in Hanover's and the North River (Massachusetts Bay) shipbuilding community. Smith entered the United States Navy as a midshipman on January 16, 1809. He was promoted to lieutenant during the War of 1812 on July 24, 1813. He was first lieutenant (i.e. second in command) of the 20-gun brig USS Eagle during the Battle of Lake Champlain on September 11, 1814. Smith was severely wounded during the battle. Along with the other officers who fought in the battle, he received the Thanks of Congress and a silver commemorative medal.

He served on board the famed frigate USS Constellation in the Mediterranean Sea from 1815 to 1817.

He was promoted to the rank of master commandant (equivalent to the modern Navy rank of commander) on March 3, 1827, and to captain on February 9, 1837. From 1838 to 1840 he commanded the 74-gun ship of the line USS Ohio. During this assignment he served as flag captain to the legendary Commodore Isaac Hull while Hull commanded the Mediterranean Squadron.

Smith commanded the Mediterranean Squadron from 1843 to 1845 with the frigate USS Cumberland as his flagship.

In 1846 he was assigned as Chief of the Bureau of Yards and Docks and held the position until 1869.

He was placed on the Retired List on December 21, 1861, after having served 52 years in the Navy, but continued to serve in an active capacity.

During the Civil War Smith was a member of the Ironclad Board which oversaw the planning, development and construction of the USS Monitor, the U.S. Navy's first ironclad warship.

Smith's son, Lieutenant Joseph B. Smith, was acting commanding officer of the frigate USS Congress and was killed in action when she was sunk by the Confederate ironclad CSS Virginia on March 8, 1862. When Smith heard the Congress was sunk he said, "Then Joe must be dead." His former flagship, the USS Cumberland, was sunk in the same battle on the same day as the loss of his son.

He was promoted to rear admiral on the retired list on July 16, 1862. He was among the first group of officers promoted to the rank of rear admiral in the United States Navy.

After leaving his position as chief of the Bureau of Yards and Docks in the spring of 1869, he served on the board from examining officers for promotion until September 1871, when he was fully retired after 62 years of continuous service in the Navy.

Admiral Smith lived his last years in Washington, D.C., and died on January 17, 1877. His mausoleum is in Oak Hill Cemetery.

== Bibliography ==
- Roberts, William H. (1999). USS New Ironsides in the Civil War. Annapolis, Maryland: Naval Institute Press. ISBN 1-55750-695-7.
