= Holnicote Bay =

Bay in Oro Province, Papua New Guinea

Coordinates: 8.5833333°S 148.3333333°E

Holnicote Bay is a bay in Oro Province, south-eastern Papua New Guinea.
