= Joseph B. Smith =

American military officer (1826–1862)

Joseph Bryant Smith
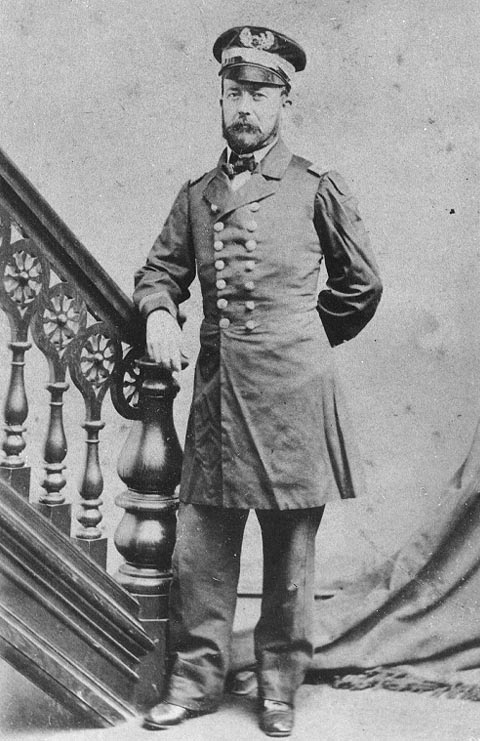
- Smith (c. 1861)
- Born: December 29, 1826; Belfast, Maine, U.S.
- Died: March 8, 1862 (aged 35) off Newport News, Virginia, U.S.
- Burial place: Oak Hill Cemetery; Washington, D.C., U.S.
- Military career
- Allegiance: United States of America
- Branch: United States Navy
- Service years: 1841–1862
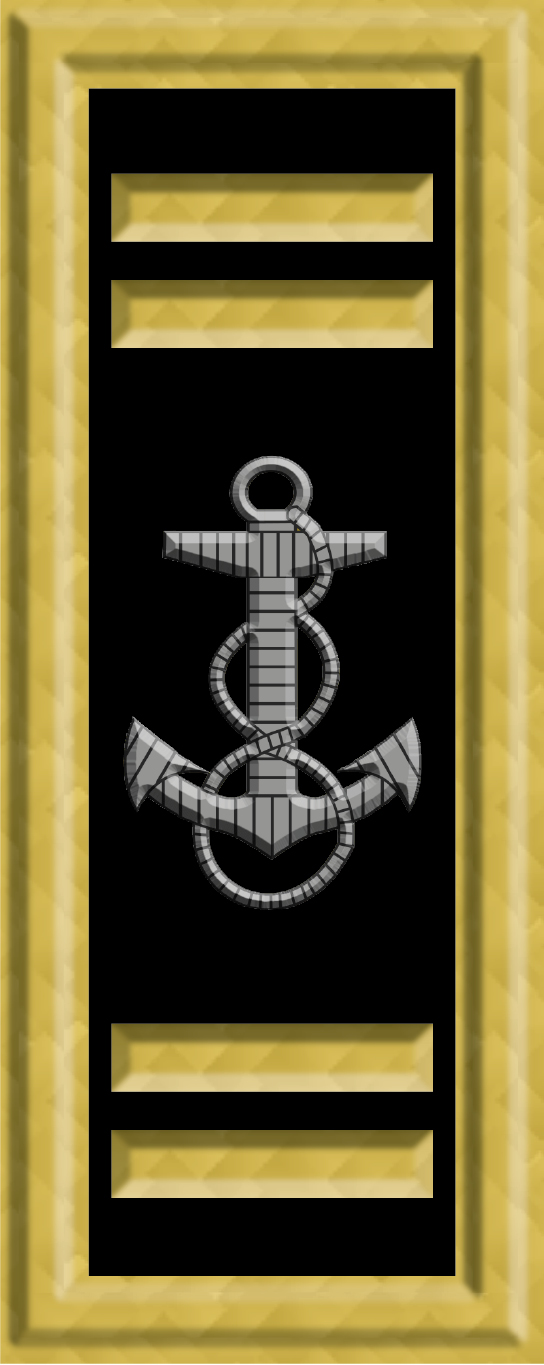
- Rank: Lieutenant (navy)
- Commands: USS Congress
- Conflicts: American Civil War

Joseph Bryant Smith (December 29, 1826 – March 8, 1862) was an officer in the United States Navy who was killed in action during the American Civil War.

== Early life and education ==
Joseph Bryant Smith was born on December 29, 1826, in Belfast, Maine, Smith was appointed midshipman on October 19, 1841. After graduating with the Class of 1847, he served at the Washington Navy Yard, in Mississippi and with the United States Coast Survey. He was promoted to the rank of lieutenant in 1855, and soon afterwards was assigned to the steam frigate Merrimack, his station until 1857. Smith next had ordnance duty at the Washington Navy Yard, D.C.

== Career ==
In 1860, he was ordered to frigate Congress as her first lieutenant. He was in acting-command of Congress on March 8, 1862, when she was attacked and destroyed by the Confederate ironclad, CSS Virginia, and lost his life in the action. When his father, Captain Joseph Smith, heard of the surrender of Congress, he said, "Then Joe is dead," feeling that she never would have surrendered while his son lived.

Smiths funeral was held at St. John's Episcopal Church, Lafayette Square and he was buried at Oak Hill Cemetery in Washington, D.C.

== Legacy ==
Two ships have been named, USS Smith for him.
