= USS Congress (1841) =

US Navy vessel sunk in 1862

Coordinates: 36°57′45″N 76°24′10″W

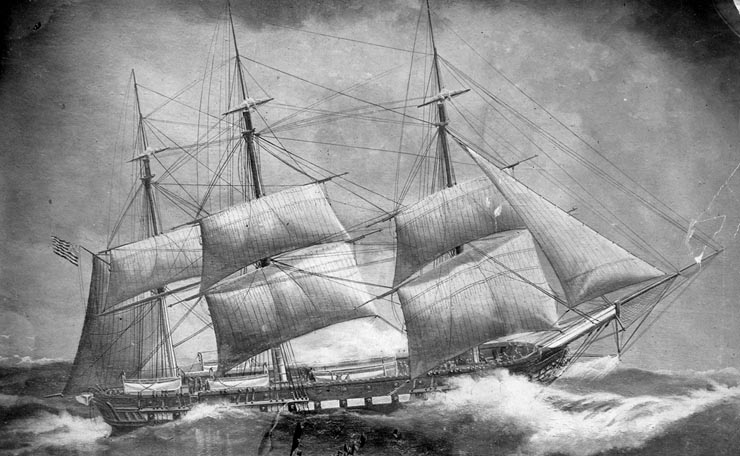
- USS Congress (1841)

History
- Name: USS Congress
- Builder: Portsmouth Naval Shipyard
- Launched: August 16, 1841
- Commissioned: May 7, 1842
- Fate: Sunk, March 8, 1862

General characteristics
- Type: Frigate
- Tonnage: 1867
- Length: 179 ft (55 m) (p.p.)
- Beam: 47 ft 9.6 in (14.569 m)
- Draft: 22 ft 6 in (6.86 m)
- Propulsion: Sails
- Complement: 480 officers and enlisted
- Armament: 4 × 8 in (203 mm) guns; 48 × 32 pdr (15 kg) guns

USS Congress was a United States Navy frigate in operation between 1842 and 1862. The fourth Navy ship to carry the name Congress, she served in the Mediterranean, South Atlantic Ocean, and in the Pacific Ocean. She continued to operate as an American warship until the American Civil War, when she was sunk by the ironclad CSS Virginia in the Battle of Hampton Roads, Virginia, in 1862.

== Service history ==
Congress was launched at the Portsmouth Navy Yard on August 16, 1841 and placed in commission under Captain Philip Voorhees on May 7, 1842. Her first cruise, starting on July 15, took her to the Mediterranean for service with the Squadron of Commodores Charles W. Morgan and Charles Morris. In December 1843, Voorhees joined Commodore Daniel Turner's Brazil Squadron blockading Montevideo in safeguarding U.S. trade during the Uruguayan Civil War. On September 29, 1844, Voorhees captured an armed Argentine schooner that delivered a mail to the Argentine commanding officer. This overreaction damaged the US-Argentina relation and resulted in a court martial for Voorhees. His impetuosity resulted in a few months suspension, for Voorhees, but did little damage to his career. Congress remained active in the theatre until January 1845. She was then placed in ordinary at Norfolk, Virginia in March.

Congress was recommissioned on September 15, 1845, as flagship of Commodore Robert F. Stockton and sailed for the Pacific Ocean in late October. After landing the U.S. Commissioner to the Sandwich Islands at Honolulu, Hawaii on June 10, she proceeded to Monterey Bay where she joined the Pacific Squadron. Captain Elie A. F. La Vallette assumed command on July 20 and employed her along the west coast during the Mexican–American War. Large detachments of her crew participated in battles on Rio San Gabriel and the plains of La Mesa, and in the occupation of Los Angeles. She assisted in the bombardment and capture of Guaymas in October 1847, and in November furnished a detachment that aided in the occupation of Mazatlán. On August 23, 1848, she departed La Paz, Baja California Sur for Norfolk, Virginia, arriving the following January to be placed in ordinary.

In May 1850, she was assigned a threefold mission; protect U.S. interests between the mouth of the Amazon River and Cape Horn, prevent the use of the American flag to cover the African slave trade, and maintain neutral rights during hostilities among the South American countries. Departing Hampton Roads, Virginia on June 12, she arrived at Rio de Janeiro, Brazil on September 1 and assumed duty as flagship of the Brazil Squadron under Commodore Issac McKeever until June 1853. She returned to New York City on July 20 for decommissioning. On June 19, 1855, Congress sailed for the Mediterranean and there followed two years as flagship of Commodore Samuel Livingston Breese. Sailing from Spezia, Italy on November 26, 1857, she arrived at Philadelphia, Pennsylvania on January 13, 1858, and was placed out of commission. In 1859, Congress was reassigned as flagship of Commodore Joshua R. Sands and the Brazil Squadron, remaining in that area until the Civil War precipitated her return to Boston, Massachusetts on August 22, 1861.

=== American Civil War service ===
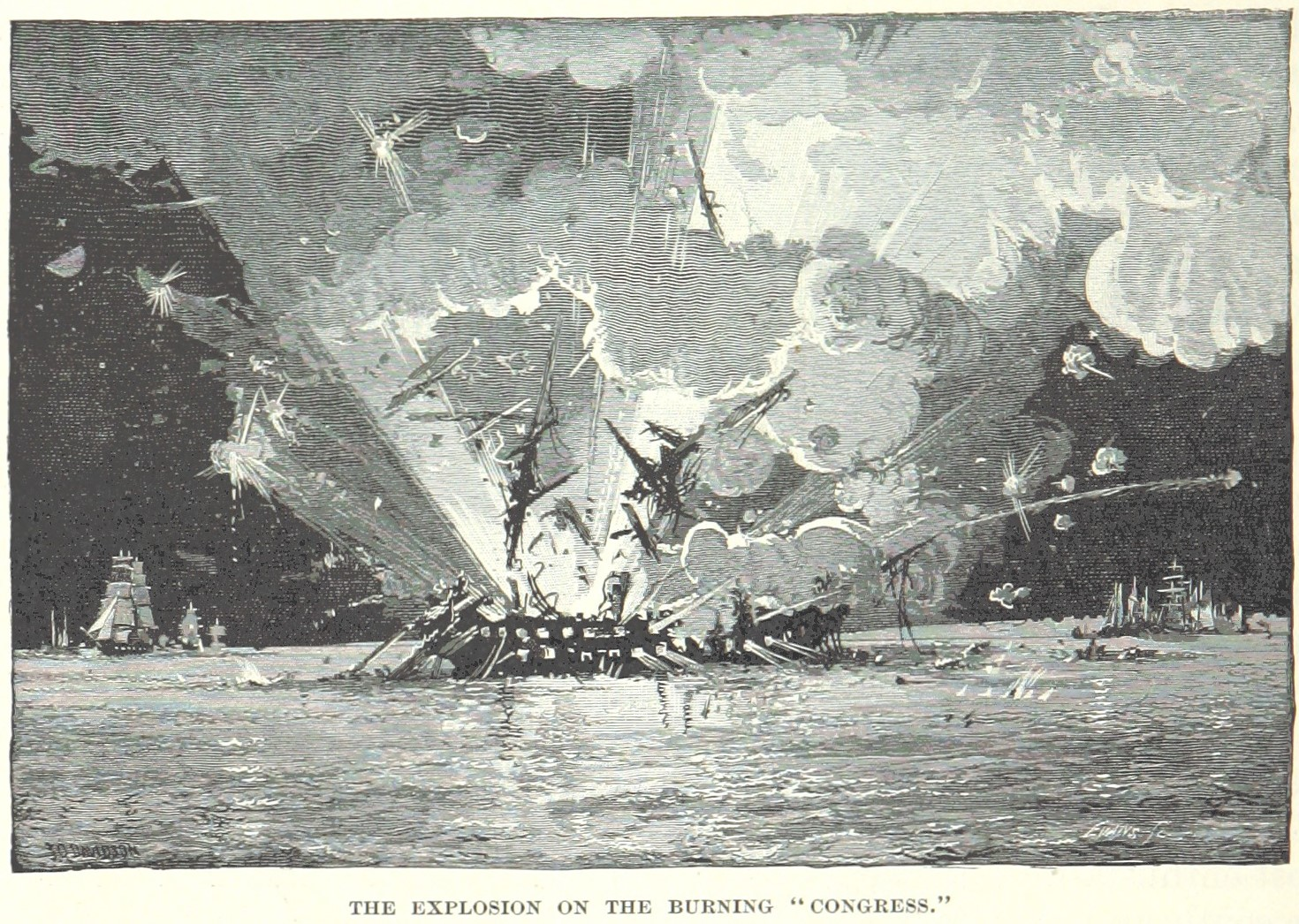
Congress's magazine explodes

On September 9, 1861, she was ordered to duty under command of Capt. Louis M. Goldsborough in the Atlantic Blockading Squadron, later to serve under commanding officer W. Smith, and executive officer Lieutenant Joseph B. Smith.

Congress was anchored off Newport News, Virginia, as part of the Union blockade of that port on March 8, 1862, when she fell under attack by the Confederate ironclad, CSS Virginia (ex-USS Merrimack) and five other small ships. Serving aboard Congress at this time was McKean Buchanan, brother of the commanding officer of the Virginia, Franklin Buchanan. After exchanging broadsides with Virginia, Congress slipped her moorings and ran aground in shallow water.

The ironclad and her consorts attacked from a distance and inflicted great damage on the ship, killing 120, including the commanding officer, Joseph B. Smith. Executive officer Austin Pendergrast assumed command. Ablaze in several places and unable to bring guns to bear on the enemy, Congress was forced to strike her colors and raise a white flag. Heavy shore batteries prevented Virginia from taking possession. Instead she fired several rounds of hot shot (red-hot cannonballs) and incendiary causing Congress to burn to the water's edge, and her magazine to explode. Lt. Smith, having been in command at the time, died in the action. Eventually, during the battle, Congress sank by the stern. In September 1865, Congress was raised and taken to the Norfolk Navy Yard where she was later sold. She later was stripped for the valuable wood and metal near her mast. The sails later were used to make a flag in memory of the ship.

== See also ==
- USS Congress (1799)
- List of sailing frigates of the United States Navy
- Bibliography of American Civil War naval history
