= Shubrick =

Shubrick may refer to:

- William Shubrick (1790-1874), American naval officer
- USLHT Shubrick (1865), a lighthouse tender in service with the United States Lighthouse Board and United States Revenue Cutter Service from 1857 to 1886
- USS Shubrick, various United States Navy ships of the name
