= European colonisation of Southeast Asia =

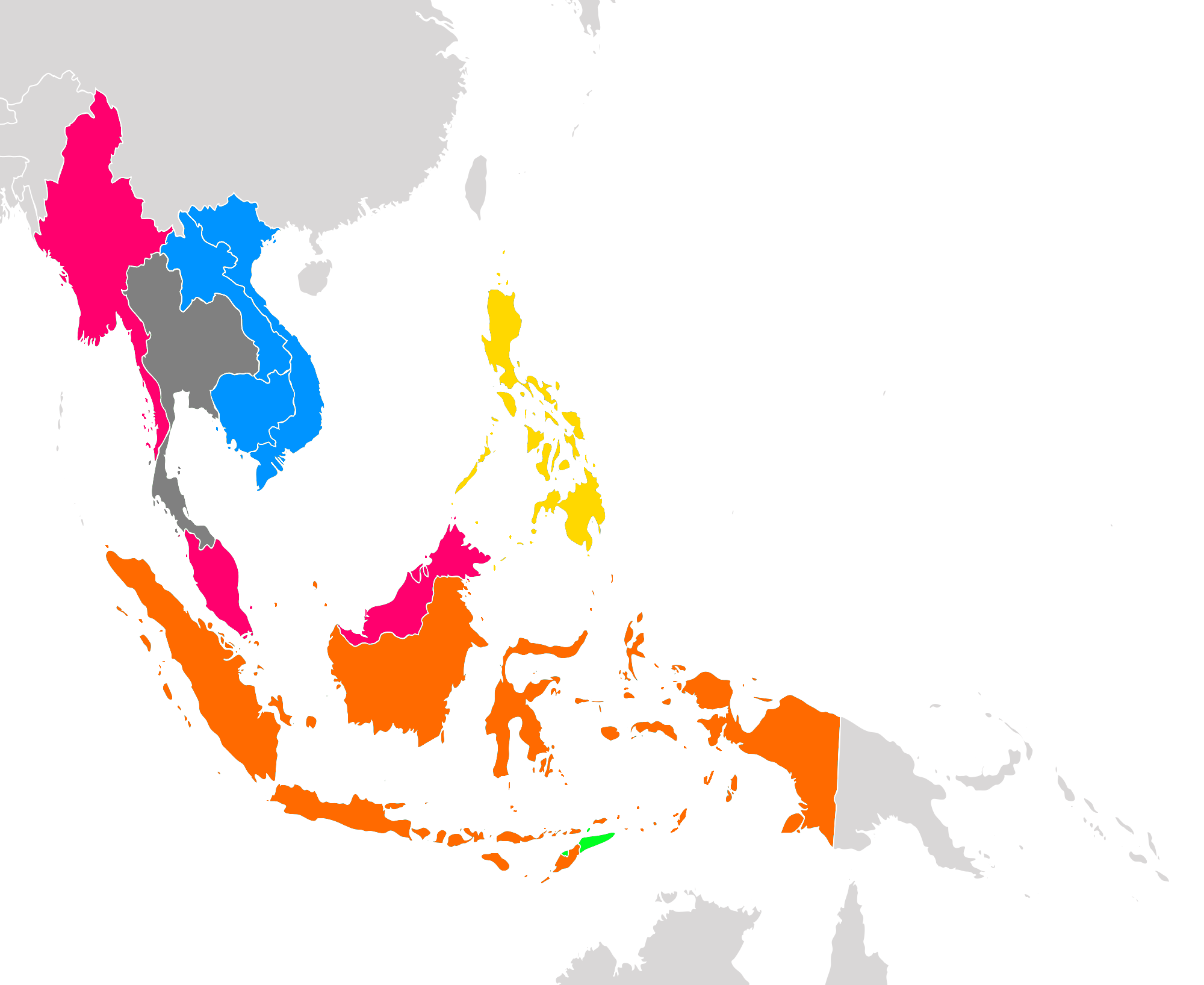
European colonisation of Southeast Asia Portuguese Timor Spanish East Indies Dutch East Indies French Indochina British Burma, Malaya, and Borneo Siam (Thailand)

The first phase of European colonisation of Southeast Asia took place throughout the 16th and 17th centuries. Where new European powers competing to gain monopoly over the spice trade, as this trade was very valuable to the Europeans due to high demand for various spices such as pepper, cinnamon, nutmeg, and cloves. This demand led to the arrival of Portuguese, Spanish, Dutch, French, and British marine spice traders. Fiercely competitive, the Europeans soon sought to eliminate each other by forcibly taking control of the production centers, trade hubs and vital strategic locations, beginning with the Portuguese acquisition of Malacca in 1511. Throughout the 17th and 18th centuries, conquests focused on ports along the maritime routes, that provided a secure passage of maritime trade. It also allowed foreign rulers to levy taxes and control prices of the highly desired Southeast Asian commodities. By the 19th century, all of Southeast Asia had been forced into the various spheres of influence of European global players except Siam, which had served as a convenient buffer state sandwiched between British Burma and French Indochina. The kings of Siam had to contend with repeated humiliations, accept unequal treaties among massive French and British political interference and territorial losses after the Franco-Siamese crisis of 1893 and the Anglo-Siamese Treaty of 1909.

The second phase of European colonization of Southeast Asia is related to the Industrial Revolution and the rise of powerful nation states in Europe. As the primary motivation for the first phase was the mere accumulation of wealth, the reasons for and degree of European interference during the second phase are dictated by geostrategic rivalries, the need to defend and grow spheres of interest, competition for commercial outlets, long term control of resources and the Southeast Asian economies becoming more closely tied to European industrial and financial affairs by the late 19th century.

== Early phase ==
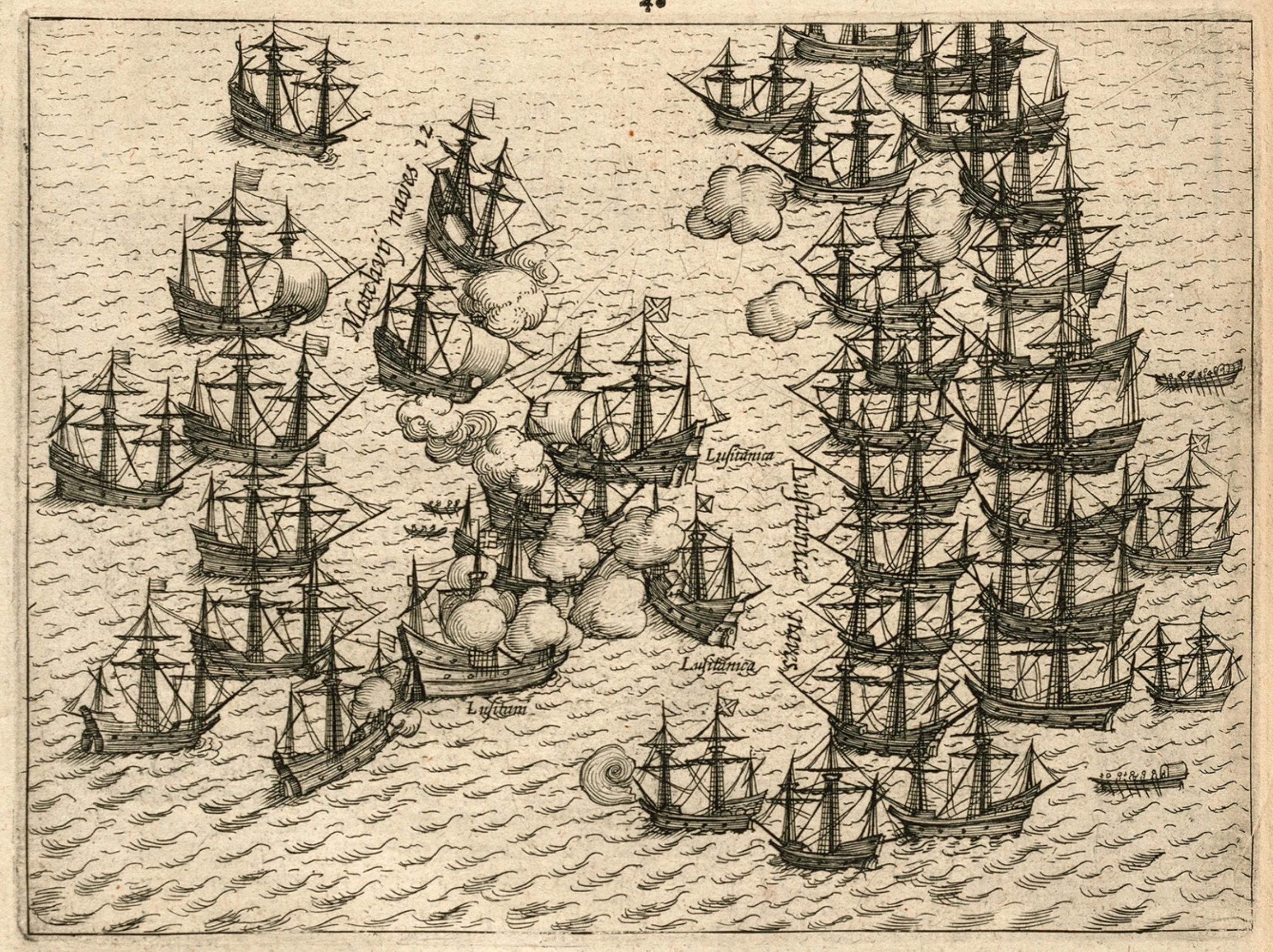
Dutch and Portuguese ships battling over the control of Malacca during the Dutch–Portuguese War, 1606

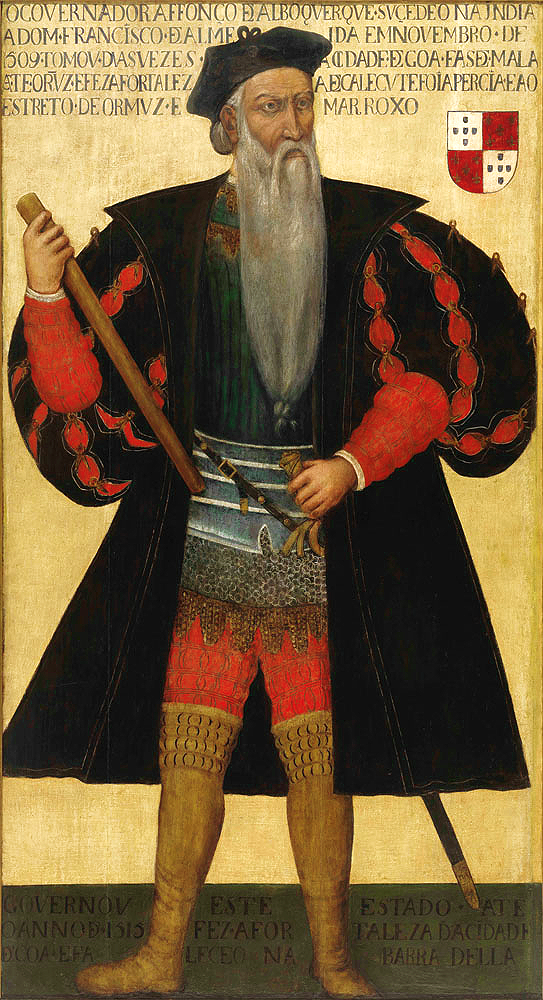
Afonso de Albuquerque, conqueror of Malacca in 1511

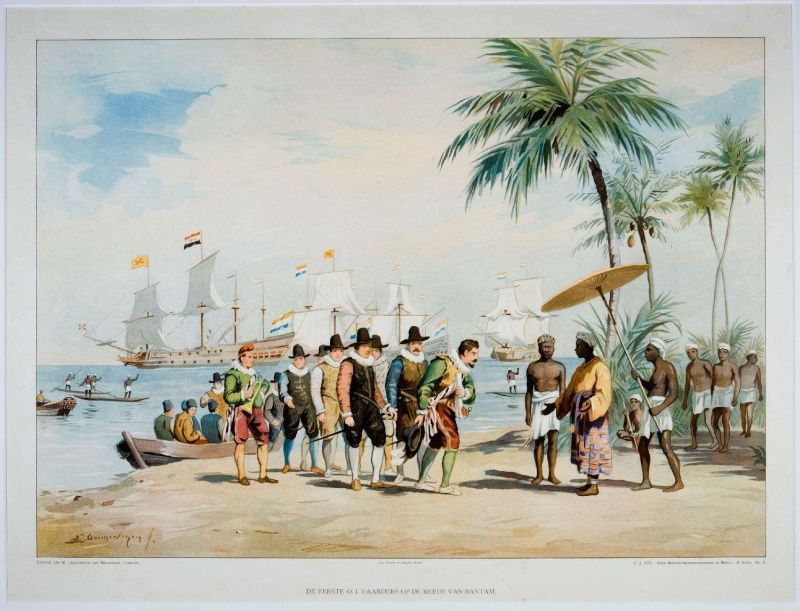
Cornelis de Houtman voyage arrival in Bantam (c. 16th century)

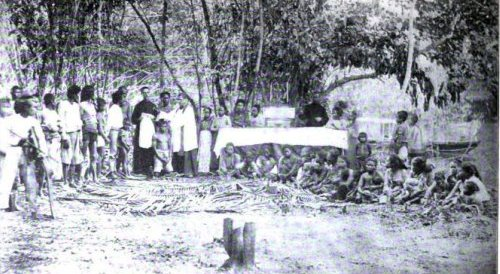
Spanish missionaries baptising a Moro convert in the Spanish East Indies, circa 1890.

Advances in sciences, cartography, shipbuilding and navigation during the 15th to 17th centuries in Europe and tightening Turkish control and eventual shut down of the Eastern Mediterranean gateways into Asia first prompted Portuguese, and later Spanish and Dutch, sea voyagers to ship around Africa in search of new trading routes and business opportunities. Niccolò de' Conti arrived in Southeast Asia as the earliest documented European in the early 15th century. By 1498 Vasco da Gama, who had sailed round the Cape of Good Hope, established the first direct sea route from Europe to India.

Central among the various plannings was to establish direct and permanent trade of the highly priced spices native to Southeast Asia, included pepper, cloves, nutmeg, mace and cinnamon. Competition among the various nations was fierce and violence commonplace in order to secure exclusive access to the centers of production. Eventually, the Dutch and the Spanish wrestled control of it from the Portuguese in the 17th century. In the 18th century, the British, who became increasingly engaged in Southeast Asia over their interests in India, gained control of it from the Dutch.

Portugal was the first European power to establish a bridgehead in maritime Southeast Asia with the conquest of the Sultanate of Malacca in 1511. The Netherlands and Spain followed and soon superseded Portugal as the main European powers in the region. In 1599, Spain began to colonise the Philippines. In 1619, acting through the Dutch East India Company, the Dutch took the city of Sunda Kelapa, renamed it Batavia (now Jakarta) as a base for trading and expansion into the other parts of Java and the surrounding territory. In 1641, the Dutch took Malacca from the Portuguese. (Note: For fifty or sixty years, the Portuguese enjoyed the exclusive trade to China and Japan. In 1717, and again in 1732, the Chinese government offered to make Macao the emporium for all foreign trade, and to receive all duties on imports; but, by a strange infatuation, the Portuguese government refused, and its decline is dated from that period. (Roberts, 2007 PDF image 173 p. 166)) Economic opportunities attracted Overseas Chinese to the region in great numbers. In 1775, the Lanfang Republic, possibly the first republic in the region, was established in West Kalimantan, present-day Indonesia, as a tributary state of the Qing Empire; the republic lasted until 1884, when it fell under Dutch occupation as Qing influence waned. (Note: Other experiments in republicanism in adjacent regions were the Japanese Republic of Ezo (1869) and the Republic of Taiwan (1895).)

=== Introduction of Christianity ===
Portuguese Catholic missionaries arrived in the 16th century under royal patronage and founded churches throughout the region. The Dutch first sent Protestant ministers during the 17th century. Their objective was more the spiritual service to the local Dutch people, rather than conversion of native people. The Spanish mission succeeded with the complete Christianisation of the Philippines.

== Industrialised phase ==
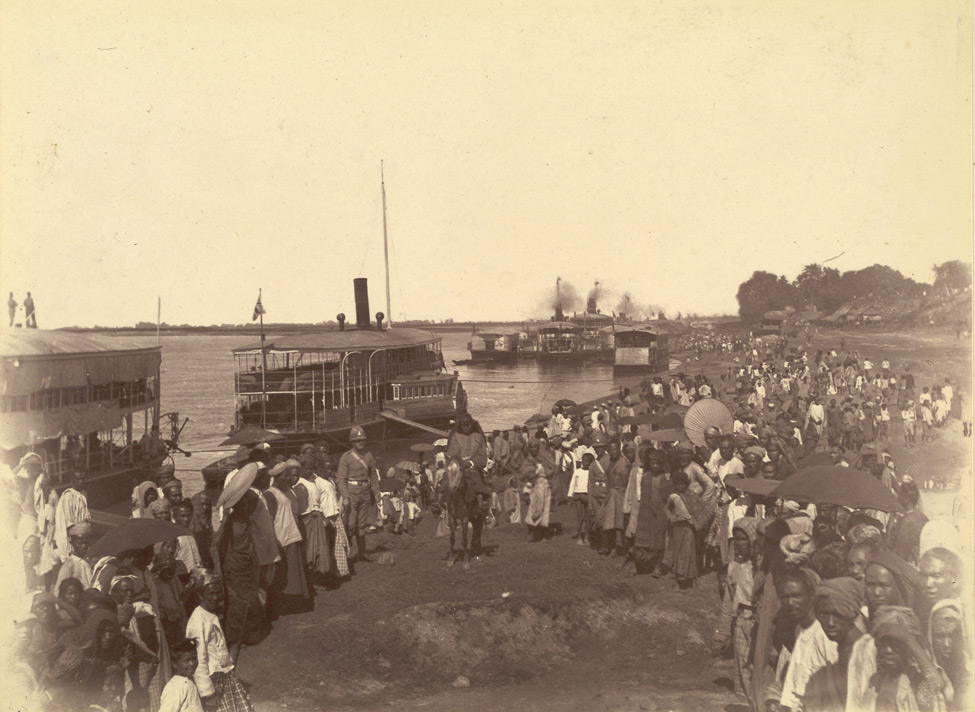
The arrival of British in Mandalay in 1885 after the Third Anglo-Burmese War, marking the beginning of British rule in Burma.

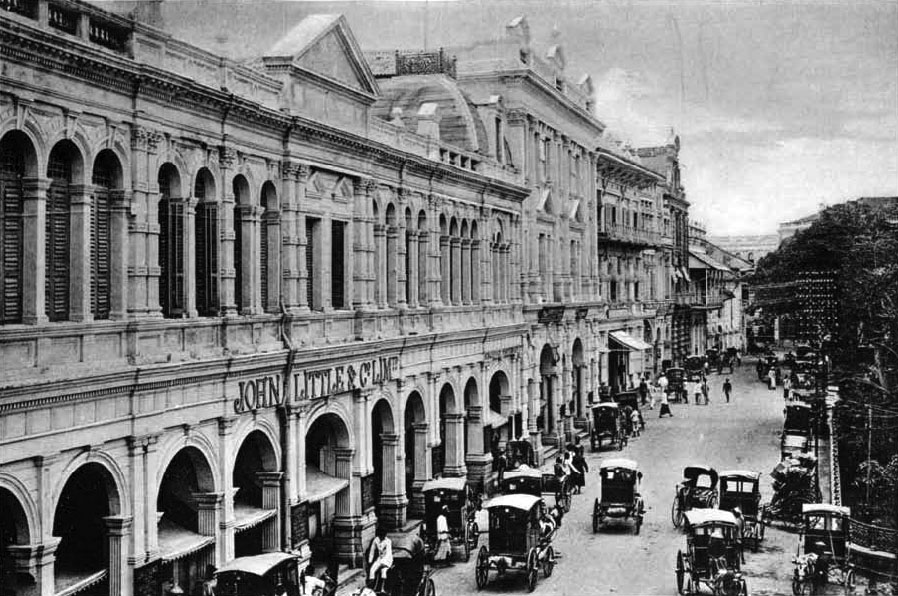
View of Commercial Square (now known as Raffles' Square) in Singapore circa 1900.

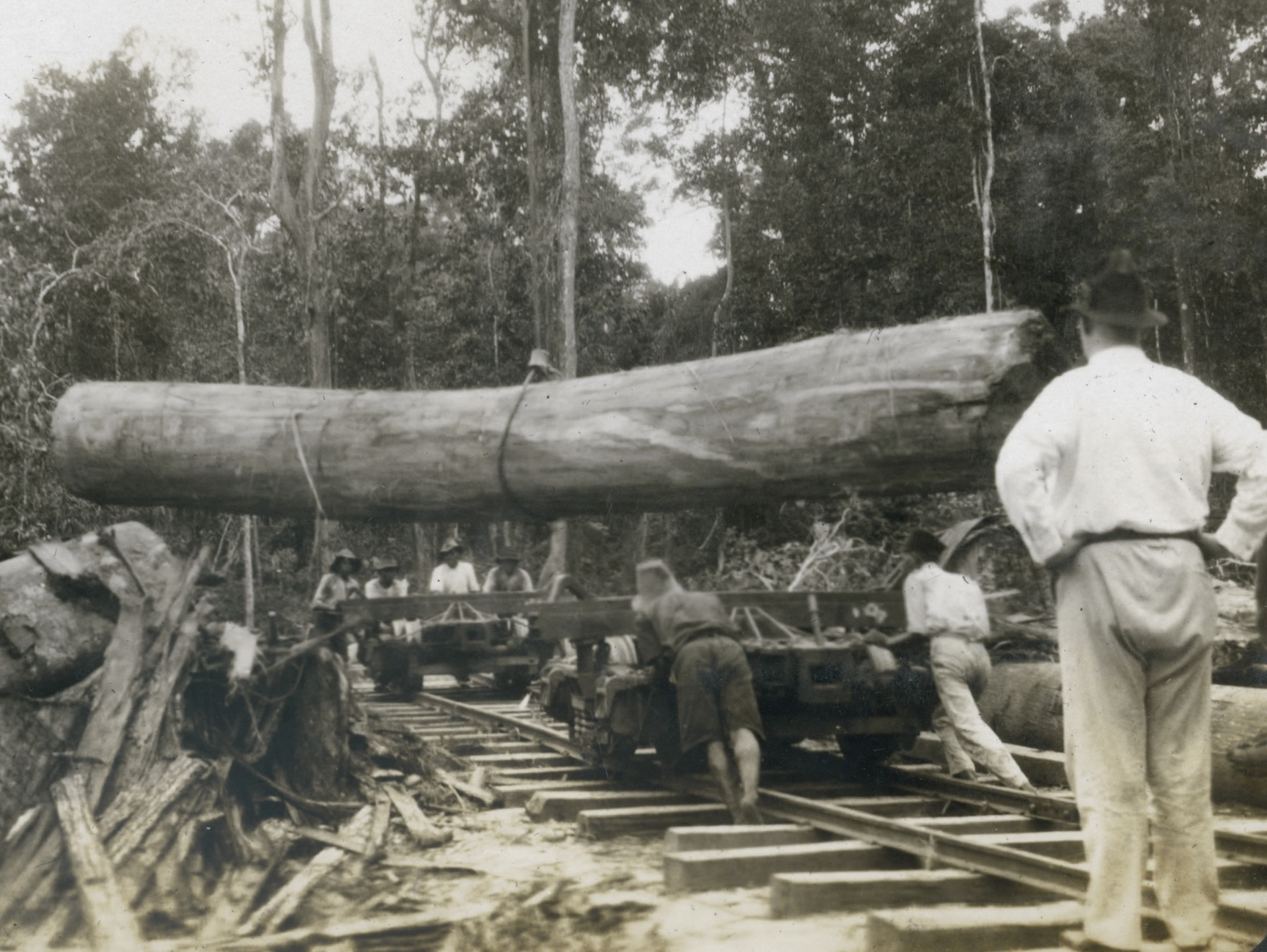
British logging in North Borneo, 1926

=== Global players ===
During the early 17th century the rivalling Dutch traders joined the Dutch East India Company, as the British founded the British East India Company, followed by France, where in 1664 the French East India Company was authorised by royal funding. These conglomerates of capital, ships, freely transferable shares and state power were characterised by many institutional innovations, significantly decreasing the financial risk of the individual merchants and share holders. An early form of the modern giant global corporations and the introduction of the stock market had trade volumes reach unprecedented levels. Governmental support, military and administrative privileges, coining, legal and real estate rights enabled these enterprises to act as the official representatives of their country of origin in Southeast Asia.

Initially, the British East India Company, led by Josiah Child, had little interest in or impact on the region, and were effectively expelled following the Siam–England war (1687). Britain, in the guise of the British East India Company, turned their attention to the Bay of Bengal following the Peace with France and Spain (1783). During the conflicts, Britain had struggled for naval superiority with the French, and the need of good harbours became evident. Penang Island had been brought to the attention of the Government of India by Francis Light. In 1786, the settlement of George Town was founded at the northeastern tip of Penang Island by Captain Francis Light, under the administration of Sir John Macpherson; this marked the beginning of British expansion into the Malay Peninsula. (Note: Company agent John Crawfurd used the census taken in 1824 for a statistical analysis of the relative economic prowess of the peoples there, giving special attention to the Chinese: The Chinese amount to 8595, and are landowners, field-labourers, mechanics of almost every description, shopkeepers, and general merchants. They are all from the two provinces of Canton and Fo-kien, and three-fourths of them from the latter. About five-sixths of the whole number are unmarried men, in the prime of life : so that, in fact, the Chinese population, in point of effective labour, may be estimated as equivalent to an ordinary population of above 37,000, and, as will afterwards be shown, to a numerical Malay population of more than 80,000! (Crawfurd image 48. p.30))

=== Consolidation and centralisation of state authority ===
By the latter half of the 18th century, Europe experienced the full effects of the Industrial Revolution, as rapid advancements in science, industry and technology, had created a tremendous gap in relative power between the Europeans and the rest of the world, including Southeast Asia. Extensive use of machines to manufacture goods would increase European demand for raw materials on the one hand and lead to the accumulation of surplus goods on the other. Mutual economic dependence had become real by the 19th century, as Southeast Asia was now an integral provider of material and resources for the European economies. To keep pace with surplus output, European manufacturers pushed the development of markets in new territories, such as Southeast Asia, which led to the next phase of establishing imperial rule. Transformation of political institutions in the colonies aimed at the full consolidation of the monopoly markets by their European planners.

However, industrialisation took place against increasing competition among the European powers. This was encouraged by changes in the continental balance of power. The Napoleonic Wars unseated French power. The commercial and naval powers of Britain, which were unrivalled for a time, started to erode later on. Competition among European powers led to the practice of carving up the world into spheres of influence. There was also the need to fill ‘vacuums’ of territories that would otherwise fall under the influence of another competing European power.

The British temporarily possessed Dutch territories during the Napoleonic Wars; and Spanish areas in the Seven Years' War. In 1819, Stamford Raffles established Singapore as a key trading post for Britain in their rivalry with the Dutch. However, their rivalry cooled in 1824 when an Anglo-Dutch treaty demarcated their respective interests in Southeast Asia. British rule in Burma began with the first Anglo-Burmese War (1824–1826).

=== Early United States role ===
Early American entry into what was then called the East Indies (usually in reference to the Malay Archipelago) was subtle. In 1795, a secret voyage for pepper set sail from Salem, Massachusetts on an 18-month voyage that returned with a bulk cargo of pepper, the first to be so imported into the country, which sold at the extraordinary profit of seven hundred per cent. In 1831, the merchantman Friendship of Salem returned to report the ship had been plundered, and the first officer and two crewmen murdered in Sumatra. The Anglo-Dutch Treaty of 1824 obligated the Dutch to ensure the safety of shipping and overland trade in and around Aceh, who accordingly sent the Royal Netherlands East Indies Army on the punitive expedition of 1831. President Andrew Jackson also ordered America's first Sumatran punitive expedition of 1832, which was followed by a punitive expedition in 1838. The Friendship incident thus afforded the Dutch a reason to take over Ache; and Jackson, to dispatch diplomatist Edmund Roberts, who in 1833 secured the Roberts Treaty with Siam. In 1856 negotiations for amendment of this treaty, Townsend Harris stated the position of the United States:

The United States does not hold any possessions in the East, nor does it desire any. The form of government forbids the holding of colonies. The United States therefore cannot be an object of jealousy to any Eastern Power. Peaceful commercial relations, which give as well as receive benefits, is what the President wishes to establish with Siam, and such is the object of my mission.

=== New Imperialism ===
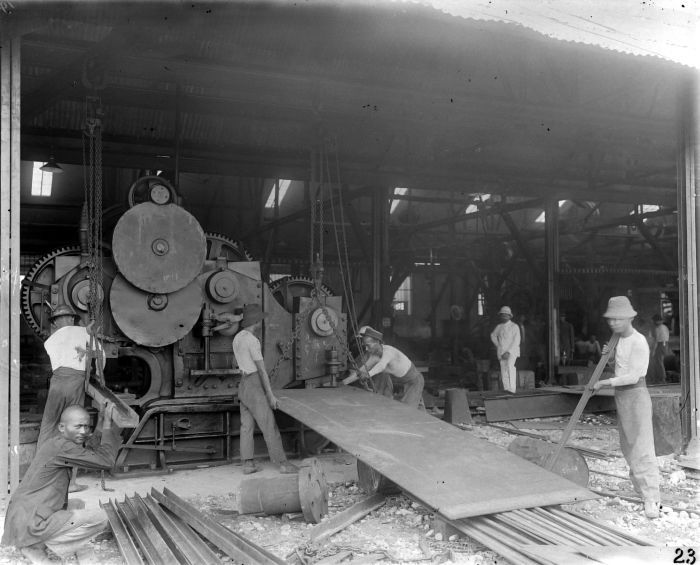
Plywood factory in Sabang off Sumatra, Dutch East Indies, image taken before 1927

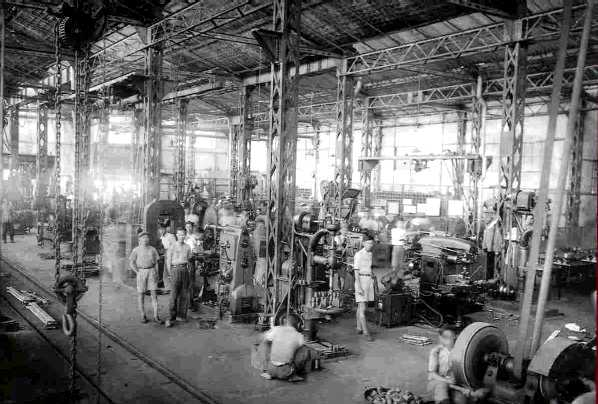
Workshop in Hanoi, French Indochina circa 1935

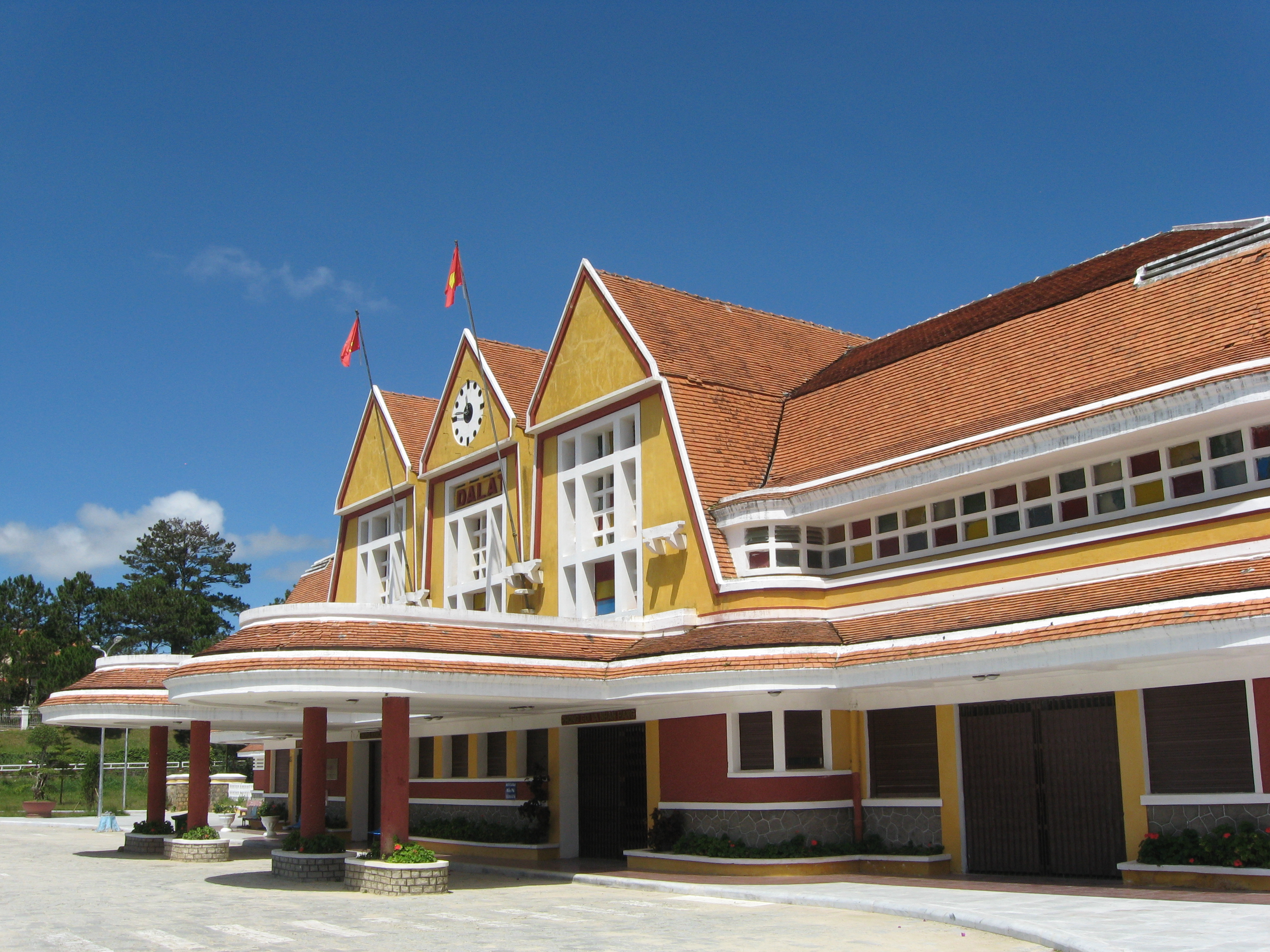
Da Lat railway station, Lâm Đồng Province, French Indochina

The phenomenon denoted New Imperialism, saw the conquest of nearly all Southeast Asian territories by the colonial powers. The Dutch East India Company and British East India Company were dissolved by their respective governments, who took over direct administration of the colonies. Only Siam managed to avoid direct foreign rule, although was compelled to political reforms and make generous concessions in order to appease the Western powers. The Monthon reforms of the late 19th century continuing up till around 1910, imposed a Westernised form of government on the country's partially independent cities called Mueang, such that the country could be said to have successfully colonised itself. Western powers did, however, continue to interfere in both internal and external affairs.

By 1913, the British crown had occupied Burma, Malaya and the northern Borneo territories, the French controlled Indochina, the Dutch ruled the Netherlands East Indies while Portugal managed to hold on to Portuguese Timor. In the Philippines, the 1872 Cavite Mutiny was a precursor to the Philippine Revolution (1896–1898). When the Spanish–American War began in Cuba in 1898, Filipino revolutionaries declared Philippine independence and established the First Philippine Republic the following year. In the Treaty of Paris of 1898 that ended the war with Spain, the United States gained the Philippines and other territories. No country recognised the self-proclaimed republic. Washington sent in the military to control the islands, in the Philippine–American War, which ended when the rebel leadership was captured. Conflicts followed with the self-proclaimed Republic of Zamboanga, the Republic of Negros and the Republic of Katagalugan, all of which were also defeated.

During the mid-19th century, the Europeans had certain goals which they regarded as important in the humanitarian sense. One of these goals was expressed in the slogan, ‘The White Man's Burden’ (taken from a line in a poem by Rudyard Kipling), which was the mission to ‘civilise’ (uplift, advance) the ‘less fortunate’ and ‘less gifted’ people of Southeast Asia. Towards this end, they implemented policies providing educational and healthcare services. Christian missionaries often took leadership roles in education and medical care, and in opposing the slave trade.

Sometimes, the acquisition of colonies was an attempt to revive declining prestige rather than a show of power. France was preoccupied with expanding her colonial empire to recover from her humiliating defeat in the Franco-Prussian War of 1870. It expanded into Indochina in response to its need for international prestige to improve the government's image at home, and to keep abreast of other important European powers in terms of colonial acquisitions.

== Role of the Europeans ==
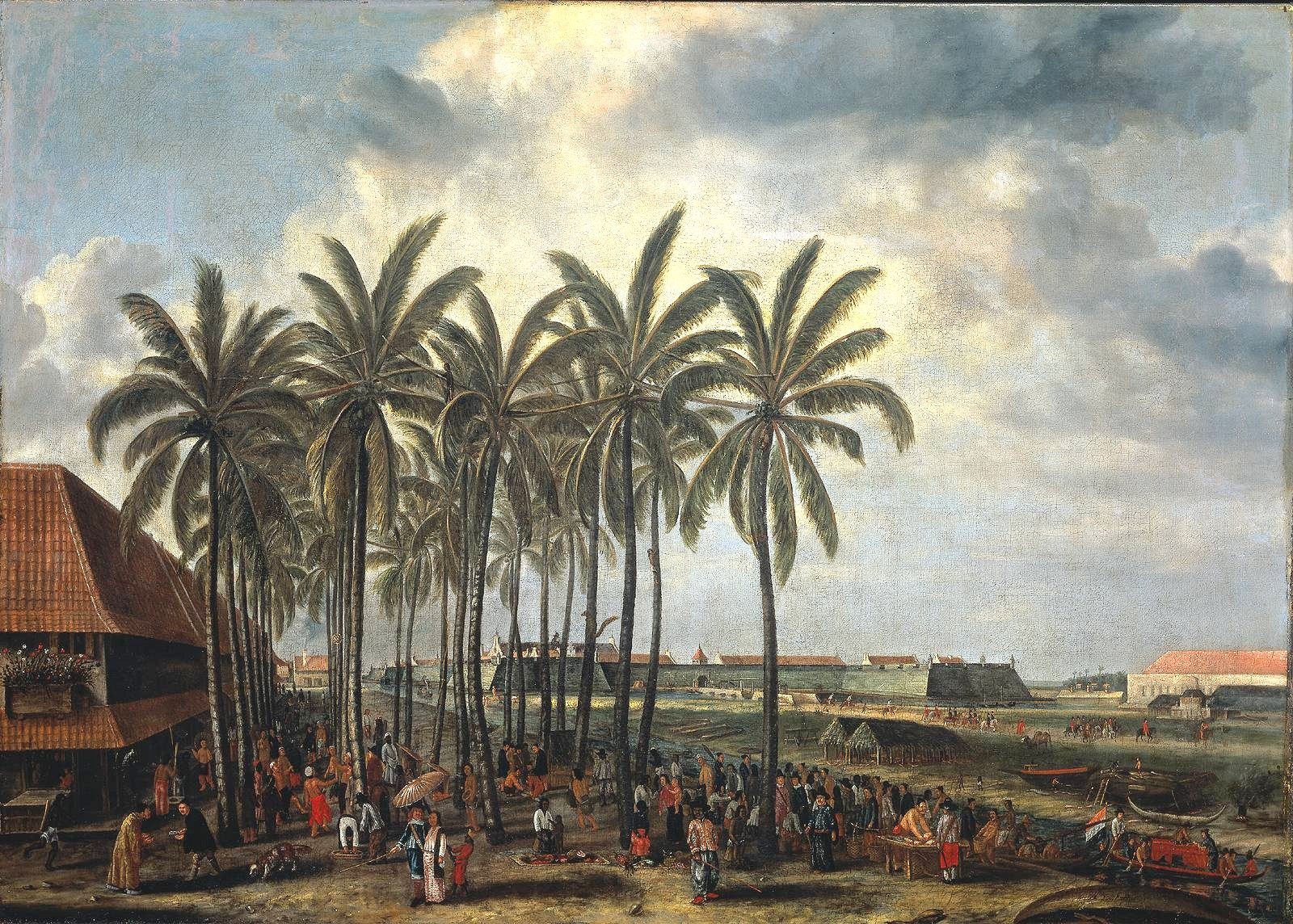
Dutch Batavia built in what is now Jakarta, by Andries Beeckman c. 1656

In the early phase, European control in Southeast Asia was largely confined to the establishment of trading posts. These trading posts were used to store the oriental products obtained from the local traders before they were exported to the European markets. Such trading posts had to be located along major shipping routes and their establishments had to be approved by the local ruler so that peace would prevail for trade to take place. Malacca, Penang, Batavia and Singapore were all early trading posts.

The role of the Europeans changed, however, in the industrialised phase as their control expanded beyond their trading posts. As the trading posts grew due to an increase in the volume of trade, demand for food supplies and timber (to build and repair ships) also increased. To ensure a reliable supply of food and timber, the Europeans were forced to deal with the local communities nearby. These marked the beginnings of territorial control. A good example is the case of Batavia. There, the Dutch extended control over parts of western Java and later to central Java and the east where rice was grown and timber found.

To ensure that trade flourished, the Europeans had to maintain political stability. Sometimes, they interfered with the internal affairs of the natives to maintain peace. The Europeans also tried to impose their culture on their colonies.

== Impact ==
European interference has affected Southeast Asians in all aspects of life. Colonial economic exploitation, the mass theft of regional resources, and racial and ethnic discrimination all occurred alongside Europe's rapid scientific and technological progress, as well as its import of new political and education systems into the region. Perceptions of the political reality differed widely among the Southeast Asian countries. The early 20th century popular communist movement leaders of Vietnam were notably optimistic and “predicted a blessed future in which automobiles and trains would no longer be uniquely Western”, while Dutch author J.H. Boeke observed, that “societies like Indonesia were incurably dual”.

Increased labour demand resulted in mass immigration, especially from British India and China, which brought about massive demographic change. The study of institutions for a modern democratic nation state with a state bureaucracy, courts of law, print media and modern education, sowed the seeds of the fledgling nationalist and independence movements among the colonial subjects. During the inter-war years, these nationalist movements grew and often clashed with the colonial authorities when they demanded self-determination.

The expansion of European dominance through colonialism was considered extraordinary as it affected the entirety of Southeast Asia significantly. Later on, more common features would emerge, such as the rise of nationalist movements, the Japanese occupation of Southeast Asia, and later the Cold War that engulfed many parts of the region. Taken altogether, it can be said that a common core of historical experiences existed, and that this core defined the region, thus justifying the use of the term ‘Southeast Asia’ to describe the region as a single entity.

Southeast Asia's social structure has changed as a result of colonialism, which also introduced contemporary western concepts. Some of these concepts were influenced by western culture, including human rights, religion, and education. The region's population has increased as a result of the presence of European powers. First of all, the region's economic activity throughout the colonial period was expanding quickly. Populations were then on the rise in order to meet demands for things like labor forces to create raw materials and industrial plants. In the meantime, some of the region's nations underwent transformation as a result of immigration. For instance, due to the poor conditions in China and the economic prospects in Malaysia, Chinese immigrants migrated to the peninsula. The British also used Indian workers. Then, Malaysia became a multicultural state as a result of the massive immigration of Chinese and Indian people into the Malay Peninsula. In Malay society, there were also differences between Malays, Chinese, and Indians.

== List of European colonies ==
=== British ===
- British Burma (1824–1948) – Merged with British India by the British from 1886 to 1937 (now part of Myanmar)
- British Malaya (now part of Malaysia and Singapore):

- Straits Settlements (1826–1946)

- Penang – British colony (1786–1957)
- Singapore – British colony (1819–1963)
- Malacca – British colony (1825–1957), formerly Dutch Malacca (1641–1825) and Portuguese Malacca (1511–1641)

- Federated Malay States (1895–1946)

- Perak – British protectorate (1874–1957)
- Selangor – British protectorate (1874–1957)
- Negeri Sembilan – British protectorate (1874–1957)
- Pahang – British protectorate (1888–1957)

- Unfederated Malay States (1885–1946)

- Perlis – British protectorate (1909–1946)
- Kedah – British protectorate (1909–1946)
- Kelantan – British protectorate (1909–1946)
- Terengganu – British protectorate (1909–1946)
- Johor – British protectorate (1914–1946)

- British Borneo (now part of Malaysia and Brunei):

- Crown Colony of North Borneo – British colony (1946–1963)

- Labuan – British colony (1848–1946)
- North Borneo – British protectorate (1888–1946)

- Crown Colony of Sarawak – British colony (1946–1963)

- Raj of Sarawak – British protectorate (1888–1946)

- Brunei – British protectorate (1888–1984)

=== Dutch ===
- Dutch East Indies (now Indonesia) – Dutch colony from 1602 to 1949 (included Netherlands New Guinea until 1962)
- Dutch Malacca – Former Dutch colony/possessions from 1641 to 1825 until being transferred to the British and became part of the Straits Settlements.

=== French ===
- French Indochina (1887–1953; now the countries of Vietnam, Cambodia and Laos):

- Cochinchine – French colony (1862–1949)
- Annam – French protectorate (1883–1948)
- Tonkin – French protectorate (1883–1948)
- Cambodia – French protectorate (1863–1953)
- Laos – French protectorate (1893–1953)

=== Portuguese ===
- Portuguese Malacca – Former Portuguese colony/possessions from 1511 to 1641 until Dutch East India Company takeover.
- Portuguese Timor (1702–1975; now East Timor)

- Portuguese Insulíndia – Former Portuguese colony/possessions from 1522 to 1605 until Dutch East India Company takeover.

=== Spanish ===
- Spanish East Indies (now the Philippines) – Spanish colony from 1565 to 1898

=== Independent state ===
- Siam (now Thailand) – was the only independent state in Southeast Asia, but had Britain sphere of influence in the north and south and France in the Northeast and East which were merely brief proposals that amounted to nothing, much like the planned partition of the Qing and Ottoman Empires.

Siam was able to successfully resist colonisation by European powers. Siam's location on the map made it the perfect buffer zone between the French colony of Indochina and the British possessions on the Malay Peninsula. The Siamese rulers, particularly Chulalongkorn, understood that they needed to modernise their political system in order to prevent colonialism. This developed into a significant effort at nation-building that helped Thailand become more advanced. Making maps was a key component of this effort. The Siamese were aware of how highly valued education, particularly geographical knowledge, was among Europeans. The French and the British used maps to identify the areas they controlled, and when borders were unclear, they took advantage of the situation to lay claim to the region. The concentration of power was another interesting factor.

== See also ==
- East Asia–United States relations
