= Dutch expedition on the west coast of Sumatra =

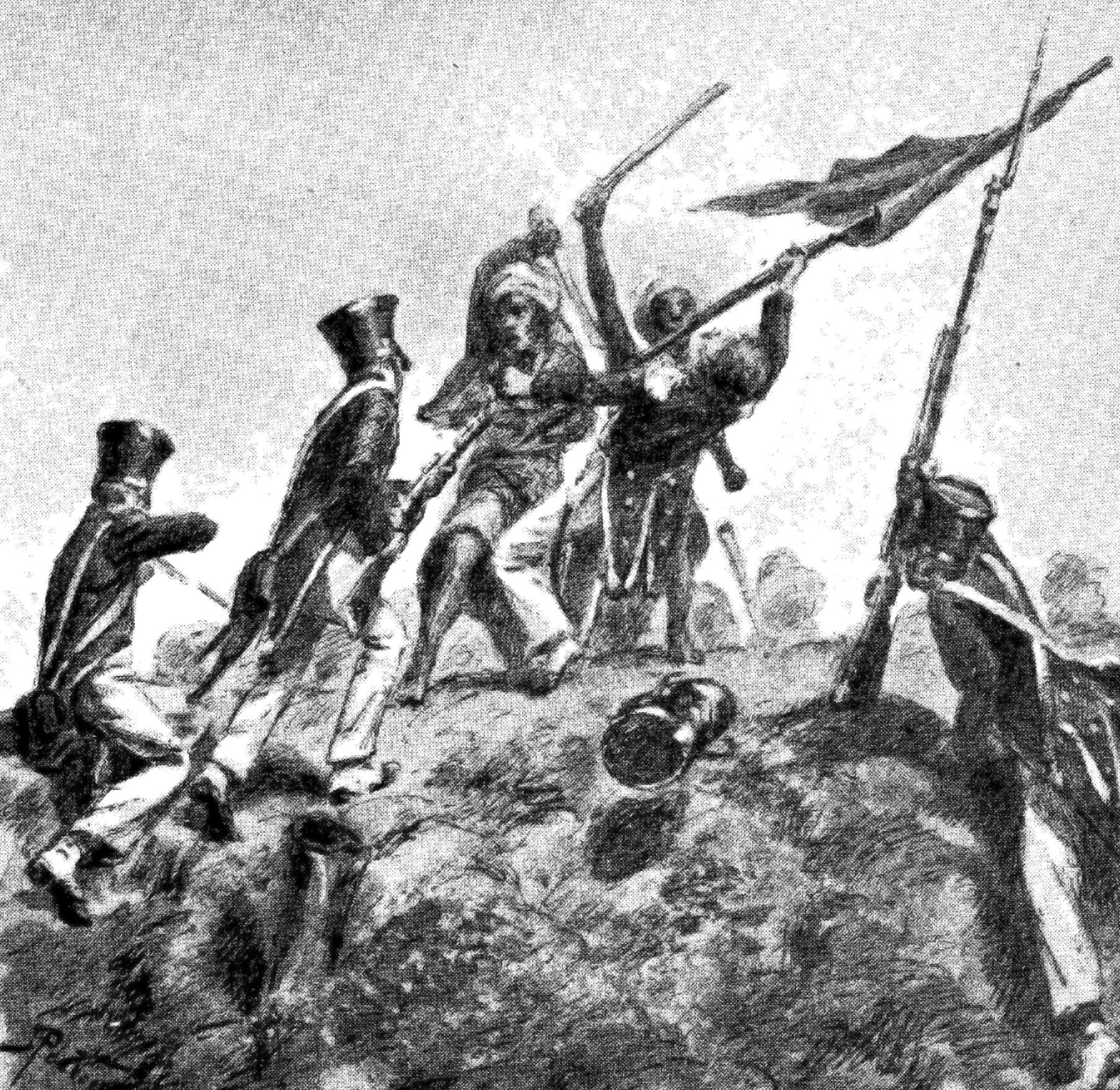
Lieutenant Bisschoff in action on Sumatra

The Dutch expedition to the west coast of Sumatra was a punitive expedition of the Royal Netherlands East Indies Army in 1831. The United States Navy, responding to the same incident, sent a punitive expedition in 1832.

The Anglo-Dutch Treaty of 1824 limited Dutch freedom of action in the Aceh Sultanate on the island of Sumatra. The treaty assured the independence of Aceh and obligated the Dutch to ensure the safety of shipping and overland trade in and around Aceh. In 1831 some Acehnese pirates plundered the American ship Friendship in Kuala Batee. The passing Dutch schooner Dolfijn made a failed attempt to rescue the ship, but fear of open war with Aceh and a diplomatic crisis with Britain prevented a greater Dutch response. The Acehnese were emboldened, occupied Baros and attacked the Dutch posts. The Dutch response was to declare that Baros, Singkil and Tapus lay outside the Aceh Sultanate and to prepare a party to occupy them in the name of the Batavian government.

Lieutenant Colonel Roeps, the commander of Baros, was ordered to proceed on the town, only engaging the enemy when absolutely necessary. In one of those encounters, he was mortally wounded by gunfire. His replacement, Michiels, took a squadron of 700 men and fell on Baros. Lieutenant Bisschoff climbed the parapet of one of the defensive works and took down the Acehnese flag, receiving eleven klewang wounds in the act. Leaving behind their weapons and ammunition, the Acehnese retreated to Tapus and Singkil, where their main body under Mohamed Arief was waiting. Again the Acehnese were expelled and Dutch authority in Singkil was thus established.
