= Henry K. Hoff =

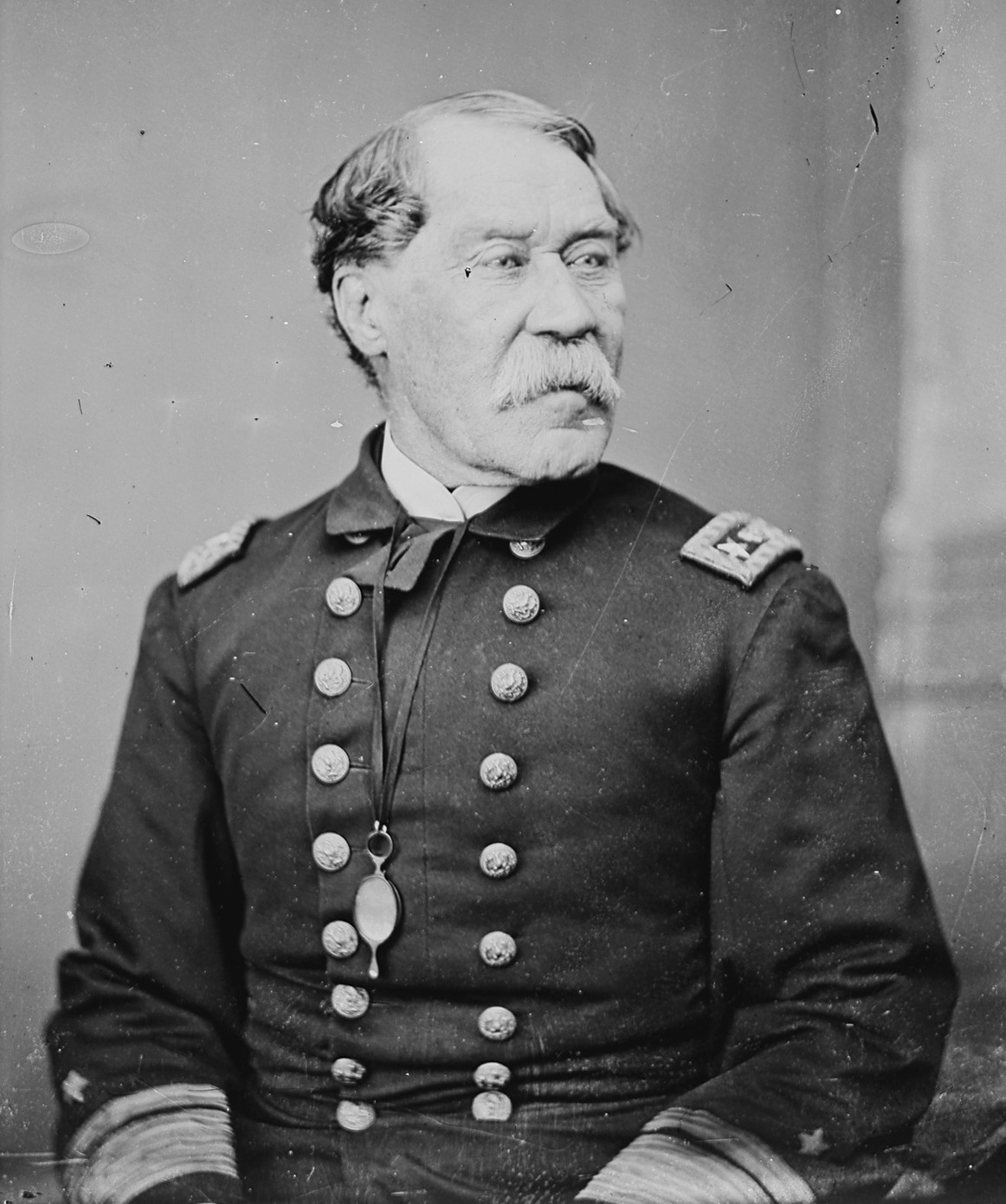
- Rear Admiral Henry K. Hoff, taken by photographer Mathew Brady around the time of the American Civil War (1861–1865)
- Born: c. 1809; Pennsylvania
- Died: 25 December 1878 (aged 68–69); Washington, D.C.
- Burial place: Church of St. James the Less, Philadelphia, Pennsylvania
- Military career
- Allegiance: United States of America
- Branch: United States Navy
- Service years: 1823–1870
- Rank: Rear admiral
- Commands: USS Independence; Pacific Squadron; USS Lancaster; North Atlantic Squadron
- Conflicts: First Sumatran Expedition Battle of Quallah Battoo; American Civil War; Ten Years' War

Rear Admiral Henry Kuhn Hoff (c. 1809 – 25 December 1878) was a United States Navy officer. During his long career, he took part in combat in Sumatra and in the American Civil War.

== Biography ==
Hoff was born in Pennsylvania. He was appointed a midshipman from South Carolina on 28 October 1823. He was assigned that month to the schooner USS Porpoise in the West Indies Squadron. In 1825 he was reassigned to the frigate USS Brandywine and was aboard her when she transported the Marquis de Lafayette to France. In 1826 he transferred to the frigate USS Constitution in the Mediterranean Squadron. He passed the midshipman examination in 1828.

Hoff was acting sailing master at the New York Navy Yard in Brooklyn, New York, from 1828 to 1831 and was promoted to passed midshipman on 23 March 1829 and to lieutenant on 3 March 1831. In June 1831 he reported aboard the frigate USS Potomac and took part in the First Sumatran Expedition of 6–9 February 1832, a punitive expedition against the Chiefdom of Quallah Battoo (Kuala Batee, Aceh Barat Daya, Districts of Aceh, Aceh Sultanate) mounted as a reprisal for the massacre there a year earlier of the crew of the merchant ship Friendship. Potomac bombarded the settlement. Hoff, as part of a division of bluejackets and marines put ashore under the command of her executive officer, Lieutenant Irvine Shubrick. In the Battle of Quallah Battoo, the landing force captured two forts and killed the chiefdom's leader, Raja Po Muhammad, and eleven other Sumatrans in exchange for six Americans badly wounded. The expedition made Sumatran waters safe for American shipping for the following six years.

Hoff was ordered to the frigate USS Independence in 1837, then to the new frigate USS Savannah in the Pacific Squadron in 1843 to serve as her executive officer. Later in 1843, promoted to lieutenant commander, he transferred to the supply ship USS Relief at Callao, Peru. He reported aboard the new frigate USS St. Lawrence, operating the Baltic Sea and the Atlantic Ocean, in 1848.

Promoted to commander on 6 February 1854, Hoff returned to USS Independence as her commanding officer in 1856. After Independence was laid up at Mare Island Navy Yard in Vallejo, California, Hoff became senior officer of the Pacific Squadron, embarked on the frigate USS John Adams in 1857. He returned to the United States in 1858 by sailing around Cape Horn, and in 1859 was ordered to the steam corvette USS Princeton at the Philadelphia Navy Yard in Philadelphia, Pennsylvania.

Shortly after the American Civil War broke out in April 1861, Hoff was promoted to captain on 30 June 1861. He commanded the steam sloop-of-war USS Lancaster in the Pacific Squadron from 1861 to 1862. Promoted to commodore on 16 July 1862, Hoff returned to the United States in 1862 and was on special duty in 1863, and after that performed ordnance duty in Philadelphia through the end of the war in April 1865 and thereafter until 1867.

Hoff was promoted to rear admiral on 13 April 1867, and commanded the North Atlantic Squadron from October 1867 to October 1869. During his tour in command of the squadron, he dealt with many sensitive issues, including troubles in Cuba, at the time a colony of Spain, where the Ten Years' War broke out in October 1868. He promptly and energetically intervened in the conflict to protect resident American citizens from the actions of Spanish officials.

Hoff was placed on the retired list on 19 September 1868, but continued to serve the Navy after that. Returning to the United States in August 1869, he became a member of the Naval Retiring Board in October 1869, and, while serving in the capacity, was also president of the Board of Visitors at the United States Naval Academy in Annapolis, Maryland, handling examinations for the Class of 1870.

Hoff died in Washington, D.C., on 25 December 1878. His remains were interred at the Church of St. James the Less in Philadelphia.

== Personal life ==
On November 13, 1838, Hoff married Louisa A. W. Bainbridge, a daughter of Commodore William Bainbridge. Their son, William Bainbridge-Hoff, born in 1846, rose to the rank of captain in the U.S. Navy and authored several influential books on naval tactics.

== Notes ==
Military offices
Preceded by James S. Palmer	Commander-in-Chief, North Atlantic Squadron; 22 February 1868–19 August 1869	Succeeded by Charles H. Poor
