= USS Palmer =

Wickes-class destroyer

Coordinates: 16.3333°N 120.1666°E

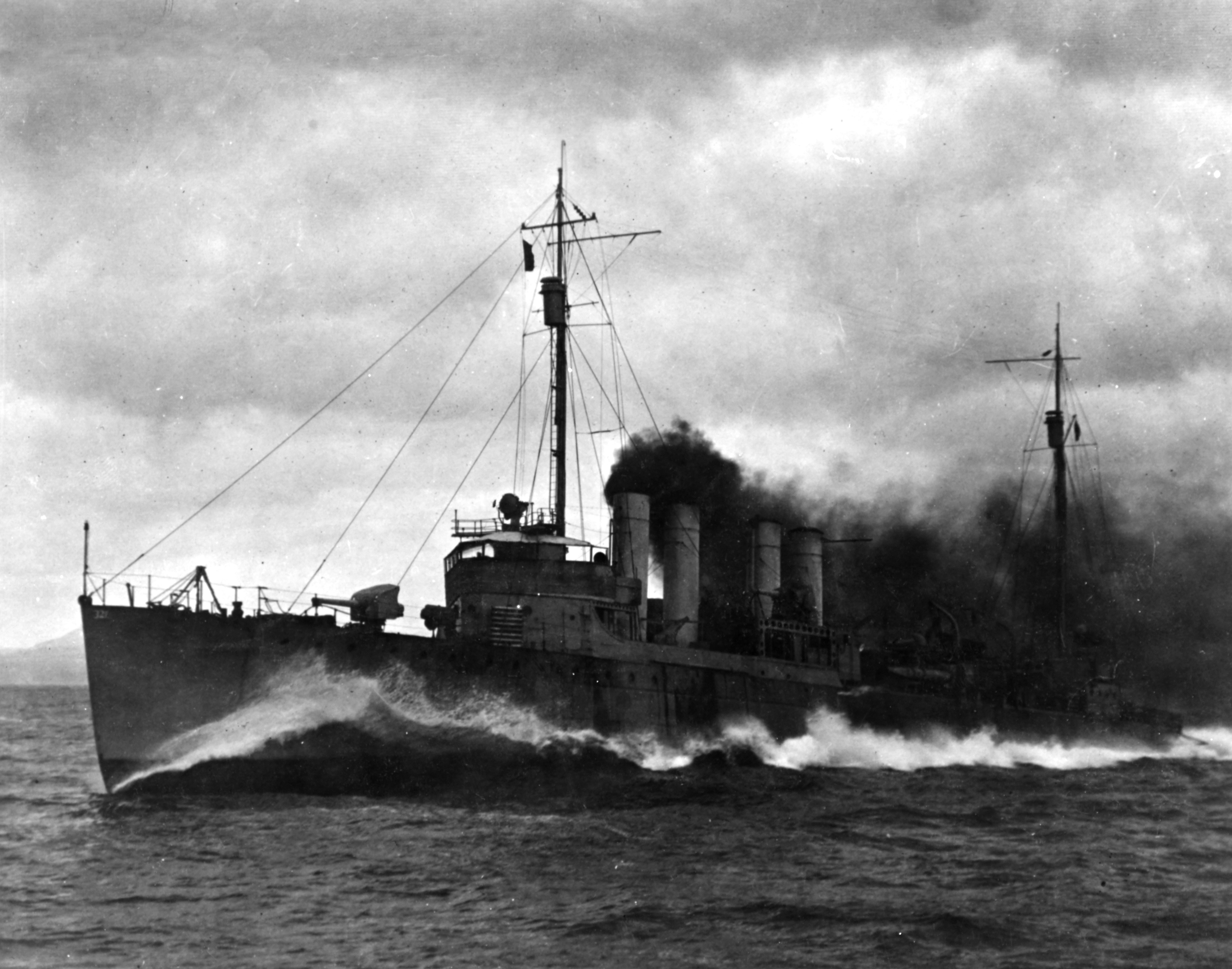
- USS Palmer underway, at high speed, probably during sea trials

History

United States
- Name: USS Palmer
- Namesake: James Shedden Palmer
- Builder: Fore River Shipbuilding Company, Quincy, Massachusetts
- Laid down: 29 May 1918
- Launched: 18 August 1918
- Commissioned: 22 November 1918
- Decommissioned: 31 May 1922
- Recommissioned: 7 August 1940
- Fate: Sunk in battle, 7 January 1945

General characteristics
- Class & type: Wickes-class destroyer
- Displacement: 1,191 long tons (1,210 t)
- Length: 314 ft 5 in (95.83 m)
- Beam: 31 ft 8 in (9.65 m)
- Draft: 9 ft 2 in (2.79 m)
- Propulsion: Steam turbines
- Speed: 35 kn (40 mph; 65 km/h)
- Complement: 122 officers and enlisted
- Armament: 4 × 4 in (100 mm) guns, 2 × 3 in (76 mm) anti-aircraft guns, 12 × 21 in (533 mm) torpedo tubes

USS Palmer (DD-161) was a Wickes-class destroyer of the United States Navy, later converted to a minesweeper and reclassified as DMS-5. She was named for Rear Admiral James Shedden Palmer USN (1810–1867).

Palmer was laid down on 29 May 1918 by Fore River Shipbuilding Company, Quincy, Massachusetts. The ship was launched on 18 August 1918, sponsored by Mrs. Robert C. Hilliard, and commissioned on 22 November 1918.

== Service history ==
Assigned to the Pacific Fleet, Palmer joined in fleet operations until decommissioning at San Diego on 31 May 1922. There she was in reserve until recommissioning on 7 August 1940. Converted to a minesweeper with the designation DMS–5 on 19 November, she returned to the Atlantic and joined Mine Division 19 (MinDiv 19) out of Norfolk, Virginia for escort duty in the Atlantic and Caribbean Sea. She sortied on 24 October 1942, screening Task Force 34 (TF 34) to the invasion of North Africa, arriving on 7 November off Fedala, where she made an exploratory sweep before taking station in the anti-submarine screen. The next day, Palmer seized the French trawler Joseph Elise, and engaged an enemy shore battery.

Palmer served on patrol and escort off North Africa until 12 December, and then returned to Atlantic escort duty through 1943, plying coastal, Caribbean and Northwestern Atlantic routes. Ordered to the Pacific, she trained out of San Diego, and then joined Task Force 53 at Pearl Harbor, sailing with it on 22 January 1944 for the assault on Kwajalein. Palmer remained in the Marshalls until 12 February laying buoys and screening transports, then made escort voyages to Pearl Harbor and Majuro.

Preceding the invasion force by two days, Palmer arrived off Saipan for a five-hour sweep on 13 June, and then screened transports during the amphibious landings. Screening duty to Eniwetok caused her to miss the Battle of the Philippine Sea, but she returned to Saipan for screening duties from 22 June–8 July.

Palmer arrived off Guam on 22 July, the day after the island was invaded, to screen transports off Apra for five days. Returning to Pearl Harbor, Palmer prepared for the return to the Philippines, a vast operation in which the aging converted destroyers would once again prove themselves. Staging at Manus, her force arrived in Leyte Gulf on 17 October to sweep the main channels and transport areas during the three days before the landings. After escorting the transports through the safe channels, the minesweepers made a quick sweep in Surigao Strait, then returned to Manus on 23 October, the eve of the Battle for Leyte Gulf.

=== Fate ===
Replenished, Palmer cleared Manus on 23 December for Lingayen Gulf, where she was to repeat the successful operations carried out at Leyte. Harassed en route by enemy ships and planes, Palmer and her force successfully penetrated Lingayen Gulf early on 7 January 1945, and began their sweep under enemy air attack. At about 15:45, a violent explosion occurred, knocking out Palmer's port low-pressure turbine. She began recovering sweeping gear and left formation to make repairs. At 18:40, a Japanese twin-engine bomber flew low overhead and dropped two bombs, which hit portside. A huge fire, threatening the magazines, billowed skyward, and Palmer sank in six minutes. Of her crew, two were killed, 38 wounded, and 26 missing in action.

== Awards ==
Palmer received five battle stars for World War II service.
