= James Shedden Palmer =

United States Navy admiral

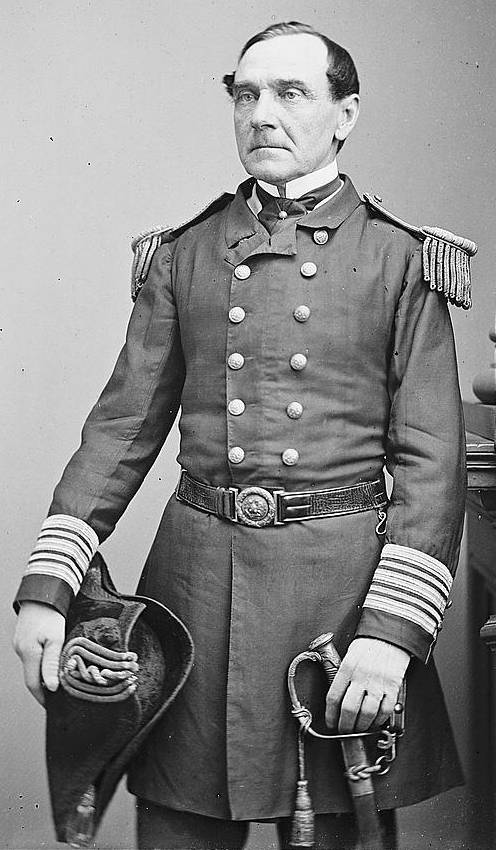
- Admiral James S. Palmer
- Born: October 13, 1810; Elizabethtown, New Jersey
- Died: December 7, 1867 (aged 57); Saint Thomas, U.S. Virgin Islands
- Military career
- Allegiance: United States of America
- Branch: United States Navy
- Service years: 1824–1867
- Rank: Rear admiral
- Nickname: "Pie Crust"
- Commands: Flirt; Iroquois; Hartford; West Gulf Squadron; West Indies Squadron; North Atlantic Squadron
- Conflicts: Mexican–American War; American Civil War

James Shedden Palmer (October 13, 1810 – December 7, 1867) was an officer in the United States Navy during the Civil War. He was later promoted to rear admiral.

== Biography ==
Palmer was born at Elizabethtown, New Jersey. He entered the United States Navy on August 26, 1824, as Ship's Boy, aboard John Adams. Palmer was appointed midshipman January 1, 1825. He commanded Flirt during the Mexican–American War, and Iroquois and Hartford during the Civil War. He commanded the Naval Station at New Orleans and the West Gulf Squadron during 1864. Appointed to command the West Indies Squadron in 1865, he was commissioned rear admiral on July 25, 1866, and died at St. Thomas, Virgin Islands.

== Ranks held ==
- Ship's Boy – August 26, 1824
- Midshipman – January 1, 1825
- Passed Midshipman – June 4, 1831
- Lieutenant – December 17, 1836
- Commander – September 14, 1855
- Captain – July 16, 1862
- Commodore – February 7, 1863
- Rear Admiral – July 25, 1866

== Civil War service ==
Palmer was commanding officer of Iroquois, which was part of the U.S. Mediterranean Squadron at the time of the attack on Fort Sumter. He returned to the United States in January 1862, where he was on leave, without orders, until March, when he was re-appointed commander of the Iroquois. He saw service as part of Farragut's Western Gulf Blockading Squadron, and was one of the captains present at the attack and capture of New Orleans, and at Farragut's attempt to do the same at Vicksburg in 1862. Promoted to captain for his role in the victory at New Orleans in July of that year, the following month he took command of Farragut's flagship Hartford. On 7 February 1863, Palmer was promoted to Commodore.

In January 1864, he was made senior officer of naval forces on the Mississippi in the vicinity of New Orleans and concurrently the commanding officer of Pensacola until April of that year, when he assumed command of Monongahela in place of the Pensacola. In August he became commanding officer of the 1st Division of Ironclads, Western Gulf Blockading Squadron, with Richmond as his flagship (ironic, as Richmond was not an ironclad). He held this post until November 1864. He was then acting commander of Farragut's squadron during the latter's absence from November 1864 to February 1865. He then reverted to his previous post, which he held until May 1865. He was promoted to rear admiral on 25 July 1865.

== Postbellum career ==
From May through December 1865, Palmer held administrative posts in Washington, D.C. That December he was appointed commander of the North Atlantic Squadron, with Rhode Island serving as his flagship. On July 25, 1866, he was promoted to the rank of rear admiral. While still commanding the North Atlantic Squadron, Rear Admiral James S. Palmer died of yellow fever at St. Thomas, Virgin Islands. He was buried in New York City.

== Namesake ==
The destroyer USS Palmer (DD-161) was named for him.

== See also ==
- Bibliography of American Civil War naval history
- Union Navy
- Confederate Navy

== Bibliography ==
- Tucker, Spencer (2010). The Civil War Naval Encyclopedia, Volume 1.
  ABC-CLIO. p. 829. ISBN 978-1-59884-338-5. Url

Military offices
Preceded by none	Commander-in-Chief, North Atlantic Squadron; 1 November 1865–7 December 1867	Succeeded by Henry K. Hoff
