= Joseph Peabody =

American merchant

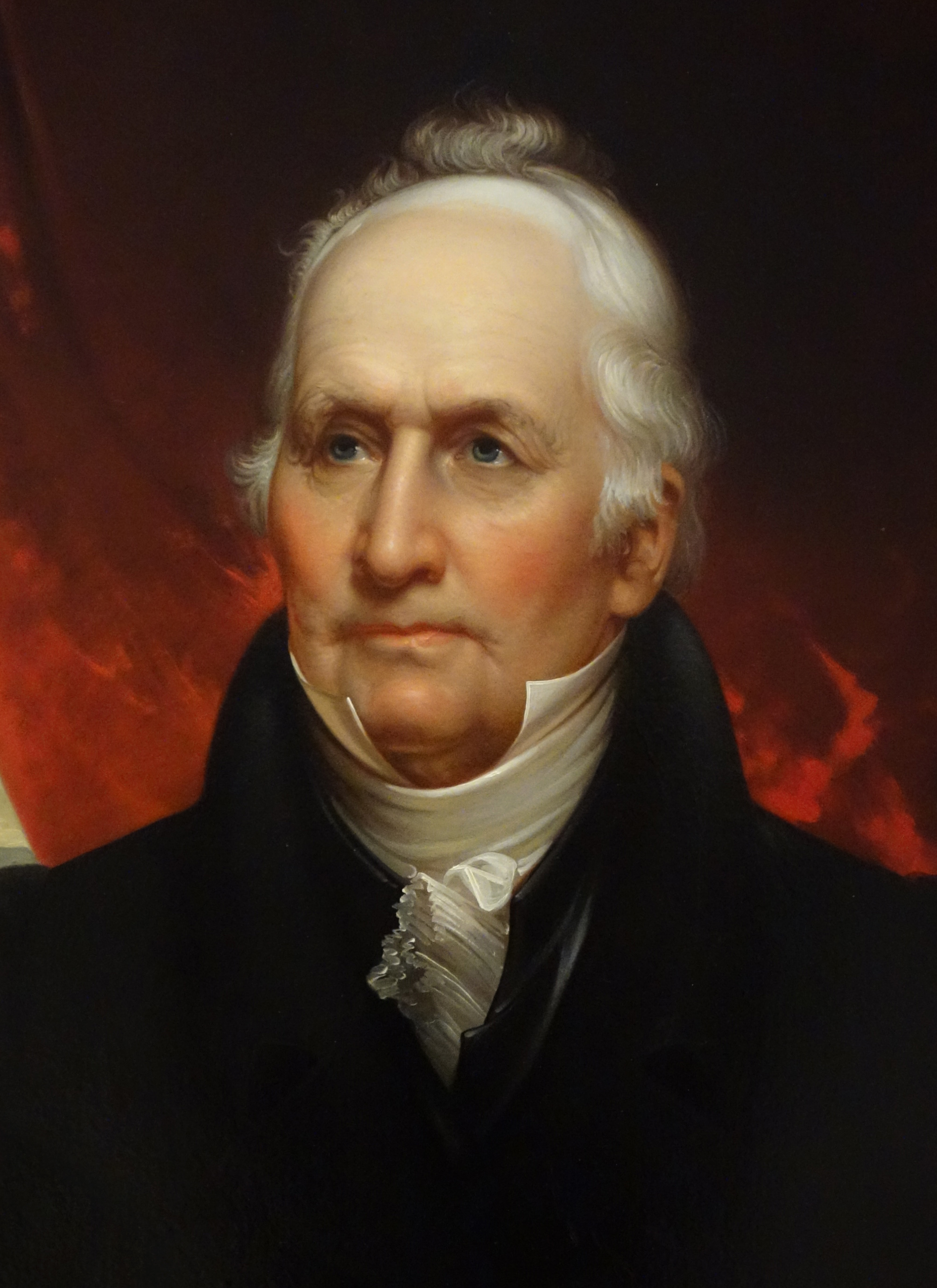
- Portrait of Peabody by Rembrandt Peale, 1828
- Born: December 9, 1757; Middleton, Massachusetts
- Died: January 5, 1844 (aged 86); Salem, Massachusetts
- Burial place: Harmony Grove Cemetery Salem MA
- Occupations: Merchant, shipowner, sailor
- Spouse(s): Catherine Smith, Elizabeth Smith
- Children: Joseph Augustus Peabody, Francis Peabody, George Peabody, Catherine Endicott Peabody
- Parent(s): Francis Peabody and Margaret Knight

Joseph Peabody (December 9, 1757 – January 5, 1844) was a merchant and shipowner who dominated trade between Massachusetts and the East Asia for a number of years.

== Family and career ==
He was descended from Francis Peabody of St. Albans, England, in 1635. He was one of the first settlers of Topsfield, Massachusetts. During the American Revolutionary War he was an officer on privateers, and acted with credit as second officer of the letter of marque Ranger. He was captain of several merchant vessels, and his company built 83 ships. He became extremely wealthy and used that wealth for philanthropy.

Peabody was the wealthiest merchant-shipowner of Salem, Massachusetts between the embargo of 1807 and 1845.

== Brig Leander ==
His brig Leander 223 short tons (202 t) tons, built at Salem in 1821, made twenty-six voyages to Europe, Asia Minor, Africa, East Asia and south-east Asia in the twenty-three years of her life.

== Ship George ==
The ship George was 110 feet 10 inches (33.78 m) by 27 feet 10 inches (8.48 m) by 13 feet 6 inches (4.11 m), displaced 328 short tons (298 t), and was designed somewhat like a Baltimore clipper. Built at Salem for a privateer in 1814, she was purchased by Mr. Peabody for US$5,250. It is said that she made Salem in forty-one days from the Cape of Good Hope in 1831. George made twenty-one round voyages from Salem to Calcutta between 1815 and 1837, with such regularity that she was called the "Salem Frigate." Salem vessels were always manned in part by local boys. Twenty-six of George's went on to become mates and forty-five captains.

== Pepper trade and China trade ==
For several years Joseph Peabody competed in the China trade, and continued the famous pepper trade between Salem, Massachusetts and Sumatra.

== Capture of the Friendship by pirates ==
In 1831 the ship Friendship was attacked and captured off the village of Quallah-Battoo (Kuala Batee, South West Aceh, Aceh, Indonesia) by Malay pirates while loading pepper. The vessel was not owned by Peabody but by the Salem firm of Silsbee, Pickman, and Stone. The ship James Monroe of New York set out to recover the Friendship, with the help of crew from Governor Endicott of New York and brig Palmer. The pirates initially refused to surrender, but jumped overboard and fled after the three ships opened fire on the village. The following morning, four Friendship survivors in poor condition showed up in a small boat, having swum two miles down the coast and hidden in the jungle in order to escape the pirates.

In reprisal for the massacre of the crew of the Friendship, a punitive expedition was launched in 1832, now known as the First Sumatran Expedition.

== Family ==
In 1791, Peabody married his first wife, Catherine, who was the daughter of a minister friend. She died within a couple of years. In 1795, he married Catherine's sister, Elizabeth. They had four children. His first son, Joseph Augustus (1796–1828), graduated from Harvard in 1816. Another son, George, was father-in-law of William Crowninshield Endicott.

One of Peabody's descendants was Augustus Peabody Gardner.

== See also ==
- First Sumatran Expedition
