= USS Natchez (1827) =

Sloops-of-war of the United States Navy

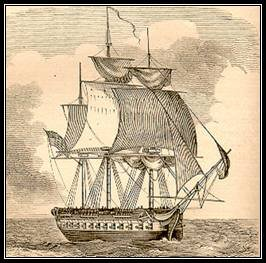

History

United States
- Name: USS Natchez
- Builder: Gosport Navy Yard, Portsmouth, Virginia
- Launched: 1827
- Fate: Scrapped, 1840

General characteristics
- Type: Sloop-of-war
- Tonnage: 200
- Length: 127 ft (39 m) p/p
- Beam: 33 ft 6 in (10.21 m)
- Draft: 16 ft 6 in (5.03 m)
- Complement: 190 officers and enlisted
- Armament: 18 guns

USS Natchez was a sloop-of-war in the United States Navy built at the Gosport Navy Yard, Portsmouth, Virginia in 1827. Commanded by Commander George Budd, she departed Hampton Roads on 26 July 1827 for the Caribbean. She patrolled with the West Indies Squadron as a deterrent against a resurgence of piracy until forced to sail north by an outbreak of yellow fever among the crew, returning to New York City on 24 November 1828.

The sloop, Commander William B. Shubrick in command, got underway for the Caribbean on 9 July 1829 and operated in the West Indies and along the Atlantic Coast until she decommissioned at Norfolk, Virginia on 24 August 1831 and was placed in ordinary. Reactivated during the South Carolina nullification crisis, Natchez was recommissioned on 28 December and sailed for Charleston on 2 January 1833, anchoring in Rebellion Roads on the 19th. She moved up to Charleston Battery on 12 March and remained in that important Southern port until tensions were eased when the United States Congress lowered the tariff. She sailed for Hampton Roads on 4 April and, upon arriving Norfolk, was again placed in ordinary.

Natchez returned to the West Indies in 1836 and operated there into 1838. She again cruised in the Caribbean in 1839. She was scrapped at the New York Navy Yard in 1840.
