= USS Flirt =

Ship of the United States Navy

History

United States
- Name: USS Flirt
- Launched: 1839
- Commissioned: November 1839
- Decommissioned: August 1842
- Recommissioned: November 1842
- Decommissioned: 29 November 1850
- Fate: Sold, 1851

General characteristics
- Type: Schooner
- Tons burthen: 150 tons
- Draft: 7 ft 6 in (2.29 m)
- Complement: 89
- Armament: 2 × 9-pounder long guns; 6 × 24-pounder carronades

USS Flirt was a schooner of the United States Navy, in commission from 1839 until 1850, which saw service in the Second Seminole War and the Mexican–American War before being sold into commercial service.

== Service history ==
The ship was built in 1839 by the War Department at Baltimore, transferred to the Navy in November 1839, and commissioned under the command of Lieutenant J. T. McLaughlin.

Flirt sailed from Baltimore on 15 December 1839 as the flagship of a small squadron of schooners. Based at Key West they operated along the coast of Florida during the suppression of Indian uprisings. The force prevented the Indians from receiving ammunition and supplies from Cuba and Bermuda, and organized expeditions into the Everglades to protect settlers' lives and property. When the squadron was dissolved in 1842, Flirt was ordered north, arriving in Hampton Roads on 19 July.

From August to November 1842, Flirt lay "in ordinary" at Norfolk, Virginia, then served as receiving ship at Charleston, South Carolina, until April 1843, when she was fitted out for service as a dispatch ship. Based at Norfolk, Flirt carried passengers and mail destined for the Pacific Squadron to Panama, and touched at many ports in the Gulf of Mexico to transfer men and supplies.

Under the command of Lieutenant James Shedden Palmer, during the Mexican War of 1846–47, she continued carrying despatches for the Pacific Squadron to Panama, as well as transporting mail and supplies between New Orleans and Galveston for the forces in Texas, and occasionally blockading Mexican ports.

From 1847 to 1850, under the command of Lieutenant Ebenezer Farrand, Flirt based at Key West for patrol duty in the Gulf of Mexico, and on 18 October 1850, she arrived at Charleston, where she was decommissioned on 29 November 1850 and subsequently sold in 1851 to General James Gadsden. For the next two years she carried goods between Newport, Florida, and South Carolina. Gadsden sold Flirt in 1853.
