= William Shubrick =

American naval officer (1790–1874)

William Branford Shubrick
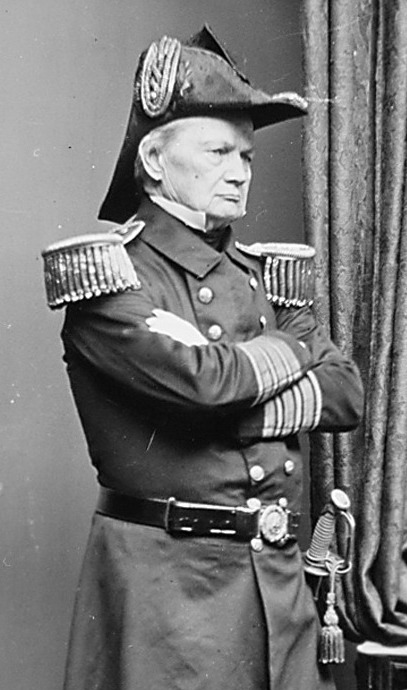
- Born: October 31, 1790; South Carolina, U.S.
- Died: May 27, 1874 (aged 83); Washington, D.C., US
- Burial place: Oak Hill Cemetery; Washington, D.C., U.S.
- Military career
- Allegiance: United States
- Branch: United States Navy
- Service years: 1806–1861
- Rank: Rear Admiral
- Conflicts: War of 1812; Capture of HMS Cyane; Battle of Quallah Battoo; Mexican–American War; Paraguay Expedition

William Branford Shubrick (October 31, 1790 – May 27, 1874) was an officer in the United States Navy. His active-duty career extended from 1806 to 1861, including service in the War of 1812 and the Mexican–American War; he was placed on the retired list in the early months of the Civil War.

== Early life ==
William Branford Shubrick was born on October 31, 1790, at "Belvedere Plantation," Bull's Island, South Carolina (now an undeveloped barrier island within the Cape Romain National Wildlife Refuge), to Mary Branford and Colonel Thomas Shubrick, William was the sixth son and ninth child of the family of sixteen. His father served in the Continental Army under Generals Nathanael Greene and Benjamin Lincoln during the American Revolutionary War. Two of his sons joined the army and four sons including William chose naval career. He briefly studied at Harvard College in 1805-1806 before being commissioned a midshipman on June 20, 1806 at the age of sixteen joining his older brother, John Templer Shubrick.

== Naval career ==
He started his active service on the Mediterranean Squadron in USS Wasp in May 1807. It was aboard this ship where he met his lifelong friend James Fenimore Cooper, who was assigned to the Wasp in November 1809. At the end of 1809, Shubrick transferred to the Atlantic Squadron to Argus and sailed along the Atlantic coast of the United States.

Shubrick was promoted to lieutenant on January 5, 1812, on the eve of the War of 1812. After duty in Hornet, he was assigned to Constellation. While that frigate was at Norfolk, Virginia, on June 22, 1813 he led a party of bluejackets in beating off a British attack against Craney Island. He subsequently was awarded the Congressional medal for service in Constitution during her capture of HMS Cyane and Levant.

During the subsequent decades before the Mexican–American War, Shubrick commanded, in turn, Lexington and Natchez; directed operation of the West Indies Squadron from 1838 to 1840; and headed the Bureau of Provisions and Clothing from 1845 to 1846.

At the outbreak of the war with Mexico, Shubrick requested sea duty and, in Independence, sailed for the California coast to relieve Commodore John D. Sloat in command of American Naval forces there. However, Commodore James Biddle brought his East India Squadron to Monterey, California, on 2 January 1847 only a week after Shubrick's arrival, and assumed command. In April, Shubrick sailed for the coast of Mexico to head the blockade of Guaymas and Mazatlán. Early in June, Shubrick was recalled to California where Biddle restored him to overall command on 19 July and sailed for the East Coast.

Under Shubrick, the Navy successfully conducted the closing operations of the war on the Pacific coast. Highlights were the capture of Guaymas in October and occupation of Mazatlán in November. San Blas fell in January 1848.

The following spring, Shubrick headed home and took command of the Philadelphia Navy Yard in 1849. Beginning in 1853, he headed the Bureau of Construction and Repair, and between 1854 and 1858, he chaired the Lighthouse Board.

In October 1858, Shubrick sailed in command of the fleet sent to South American waters to support diplomatic efforts to resolve differences with Paraguay resulting from the firing upon USS Water Witch.

When the Civil War struck, Shubrick was the navy's most senior active service officer hailing from the South. He remained loyal to the Union. In December 1861, a law was passed by Congress according to which all navy officers were to retire after reaching sixty-two years or accumulating forty five years of service; Shubrick was placed on the retired list. He was promoted to rear admiral on the retired list on 16 July 1862 and for ten years served as chairman of the United States Lighthouse Board where he was a member since 1852. He died in Washington, D.C., on May 27, 1874. He was buried at Oak Hill Cemetery in Washington, D.C.

== Family ==
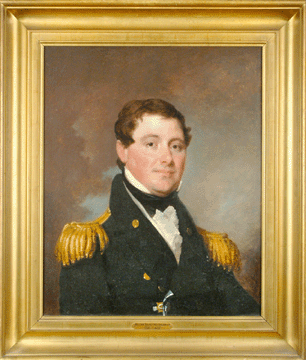
Portrait by Gilbert Stuart circa 1828

In September, 1815, Shubrick married Harriet Cordelia Wethered; they had one child. Three of his brothers were also officers in the United States Navy: John Templar Shubrick (1788–1815), Edward Rutledge Shubrick (1794–1844), and Irvine Shubrick (1798–1849).

== Namesakes ==
Several ships in the U.S. Navy have been named USS Shubrick for him.

== Bibliography ==
- Cooper, James Fenimore (1856). History of the navy of the United States of America.
  Stringer & Townsend, New York. p. 508. OCLC 197401914. Url
- Cooper, James Fenimore (1846). Lives of distinguished American naval officers.
  Carey and Hart, Philadelphia. p. 436. OCLC 620356. Url1
- Hamersly, Lewis R. (1870). The Records of Living Officers of the U.S. Navy and Marine Corps.
  J.B. Lippincott & Co., Philadelphia. p. 27. OCLC 3577674.

== Notes ==
Military offices
Preceded by James Biddle	Commander, East India Squadron; 6 March 1848–13 May 1848	Succeeded by David Geisinger
