= Kuala Batee =

Kuala Batee is a district in Southwest Aceh Regency, Aceh, Indonesia. Kuala Batee was attacked by American land and naval forces in 1832 after the crew of a U.S. merchant ship were killed in the area.

== List of villages ==
The district is divided into 21 villages (gampong), grouped into 3 mukim. These are listed below according to mukim.

- Mukim Krueng Batee
  - Alue Pisang
  - Ie Mameh
  - Keude Baro
  - Krueng Batee
  - Lama Tuha
  - Lhok Gajah
  - Drien Beureumbang
  - Rumoh Panyang
- Mukim Kuta Bahagia
  - Blang Makmur
  - Krueng Panto
  - Geulanggang Gajah
  - Kuala Teurubue
  - Kuta Bahagia
  - Panto Cut
  - Pasar Kota Bahagia
  - Krueng Panto
- Mukim Sikabu
  - Alue Padee
  - Blang Panyang
  - Kampung Teungoh
  - Lhung Geulumpang
  - Muka Blang
  - Padang Sikabu
