= USLHT Shubrick =

US lighthouse tender

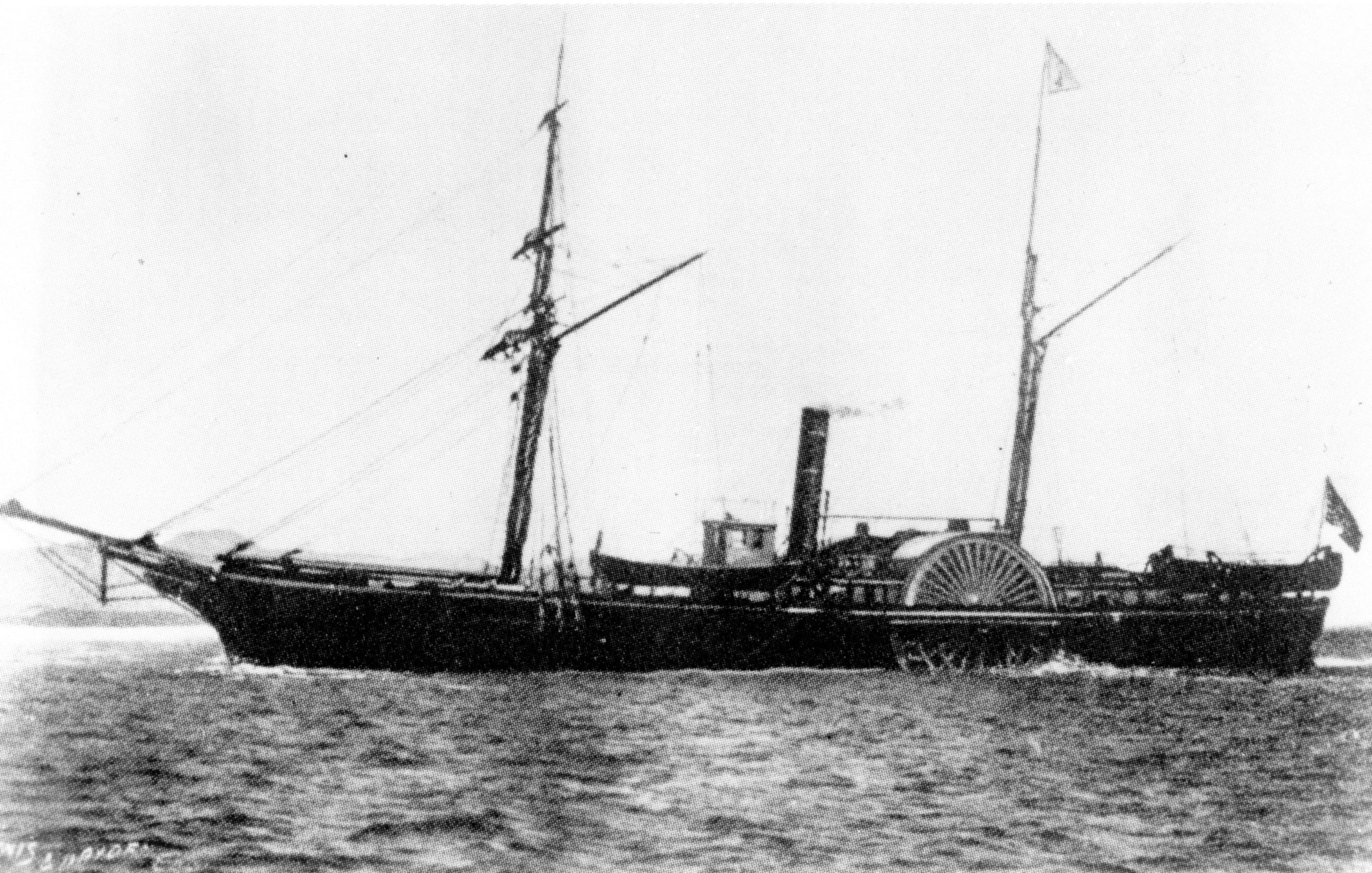
- Shubrick

History

United States
- Name: Shubrick
- Builder: Philadelphia Navy Yard
- Launched: 8 August 1857
- Commissioned: 25 November 1857 (LHS)
- Decommissioned: 23 August 1861
- Recommissioned: 15 October 1861 (RCS)
- Decommissioned: 24 December 1866
- Recommissioned: 24 December 1866 (LHS)
- Decommissioned: January 1886
- Identification: Signal letters G.V.M.L.
- Fate: Scrapped 1886

General characteristics as built in 1857
- Displacement: 305 long tons (310 t)
- Length: 140 ft 8 in (42.88 m)
- Beam: 22 ft 6 in (6.86 m)
- Draft: 9 ft (2.7 m)
- Propulsion: 150 hp single-expansion steam engine; 19-foot-diameter (5.8 m) paddle-wheels
- Speed: 8 knots (15 km/h; 9.2 mph) cruising; 12 knots (22 km/h; 14 mph) maximum
- Armament: 1 × 24-pounder Dahlgren gun on a swivel carriage; 2 × 12-pounder gun

USLHT Shubrick was a paddlewheel steamship built for United States Lighthouse Service in 1857. She was the first vessel built specifically as a lighthouse tender, the first steam-propelled lighthouse tender, and the first lighthouse tender on the Pacific Coast of the United States.

As one of the few armed government vessels on the west coast, Shubrick was put to a variety of uses. Most of her years were spent in placing and maintaining buoys, and building and supplying lighthouses. During the Pig War and the American Civil War she had minor military roles. She spent five years as a revenue cutter, enforcing customs regulations. She rescued mariners in distress and provided relief to flood victims.

After thirty years at sea, Shubrick was sold for scrap and broken up at San Francisco in 1886.

== Construction and characteristics ==
The United States gained a Pacific coast through the Oregon Treaty, which settled the boundary between the United States and the British possessions to the north in 1846, and the Treaty of Guadalupe Hidalgo which ended the Mexican-American War in 1848. This territorial expansion was reinforced by the California gold rush in 1849, and California statehood in 1850 which significantly increased maritime traffic on the west coast. In response, the United States Congress began to fund aids to navigation on the Pacific in 1852. By 1856 there were 23 lighthouses, but no lighthouse tenders to maintain them. Congress appropriated $60,000 on 18 August 1856 for a lighthouse tender for California.

Shubrick's hull was built of live and white oak. Her timbers were fastened with copper and iron nails. She was 140 feet (43 m) long, with a beam of 22 feet (6.7 m), and a draft of 9 feet (2.7 m). She displaced 305 tons.

Her 150 horsepower engine was built by James Murphy & Co. at its Fulton Iron Works in New York. The steeple-type engine had a single cylinder which was 50 inches (1.3 m) in diameter with a 48 inches (1.2 m) stroke. Her engine and machinery was reported to have cost $21,000. The engine drove paddlewheels on each side of the ship which were 19 feet (5.8 m) in diameter with a face of 9.6 feet (2.9 m). Steam was provided by a single vertical-tube boiler that was fired by three coal-burning furnaces.

She had two masts and was rigged as a brigantine.

Shubrick was built at the Philadelphia Navy Yard and was launched on 8 August 1857. Her sea trial took place on 4 November 1857. She reached a speed of 12 knots.

When she was launched in 1857, her complement was 8 officers and 29 men.

She was the first lighthouse tender armed. The rationale for her guns was stated by the Lighthouse Board in 1858 as, "in case of incursions of the Indians from the British dominions in the Straits of Fuca and vicinity, to protect the [lighthouse] keepers and citizens in that quarter against their attacks." Her armament varied over the course of her career. In 1858 she mounted a 24-pounder Dahlgren howitzer, and two brass 12-pounder guns, and carried 60 breech-loading rifles for her crew. By 1865 she was reported to possess a 30-pounder rifled Parrott gun, the 24-pounder, and four 12-pounders.

The ship was named for Rear Admiral William B. Shubrick, the first chairman of the Lighthouse Board.

== Service history ==
=== Lighthouse Service (1857–1861) ===
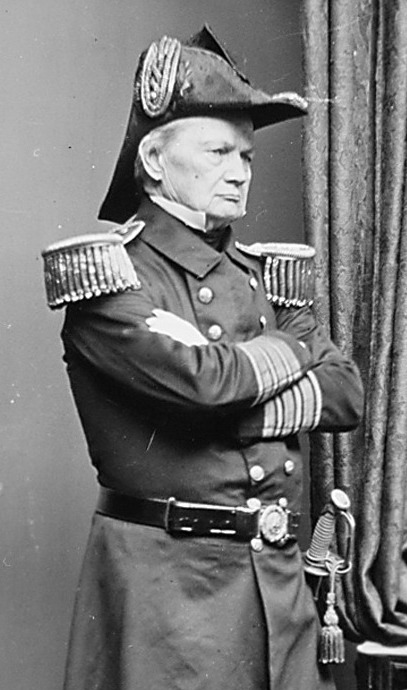
Admiral William B. Shubrick, the ship's namesake

Shubrick was placed in commission on 26 November 1857. She was assigned to the 12th Lighthouse District, which at the time included the entire Pacific coast of the United States. She set sail from Philadelphia for her new home port, San Francisco, on 22 December 1857. She was damaged by a gale and was forced to throw her deck cargo overboard to prevent capsizing, but reached St. Thomas where she stopped for coal and repairs. She made coaling stops at Barbados, Pernambuco, and Rio de Janeiro. Eight of her crew contracted yellow fever in Rio, and one died. She stopped next at Montivedeo. Shubrick sailed through the Strait of Magellan, stopped at Valparaiso, and Panama City, and finally arrived at San Francisco on 27 May 1858 after a voyage of 155 days.

Tensions between white settlers and native Americans around Puget Sound erupted into battle in 1856, and were still simmering when Shubrick reached San Francisco. Of particular interest to the Lighthouse Service were threats against the keeper of the Cape Flattery light by members of the Makah tribe. The light was built on Tatoosh Island, a traditional summer camp for whaling, but this was not the only source of friction with the tribe. On 30 June 1858, Shubrick sailed north to intervene in the situation. Discussions with tribal leaders were held without resolution. The ship returned to San Francisco on 25 July 1858.

In the spring of 1859, Shubrick placed the first buoys in the Columbia River, marking the channel from the Pacific to Astoria. She continued up the river and on 21 May 1859 the ship was at Portland. She spent the rest of that summer in Puget Sound, including stops at Port Townsend, Steilacoom, and Olympia. Shubrick again sought to resolve conflicts with native Americans over a new lighthouse, this time threats against the Smith Island light. There were also tensions with the British over the maritime border between the United States and British Columbia. Ambiguities in the Oregon Treaty led to an armed confrontation in the San Juan Islands, which became known as the Pig War. Shubrick played a small but notable role in the affair. She arrived back in San Francisco on 4 October 1859. In November 1859 her crew was paid off and she was laid up for the winter at the Mare Island Navy Yard.

In 1860 and 1861 Shubrick made cruises south to San Diego and north to Puget Sound tending buoys and lighthouses. In October 1860 she surveyed Cape Mendocino and Humboldt Bay for potential sites for a lighthouse. The Lighthouse Board had difficulty convincing Congress to fund Shubrick's ongoing operations, however, so she was laid up for lack of funds for parts of 1860 and 1861. Rather than let her sit idle, the Secretary of the Treasury loaned her from the Lighthouse Service to the Revenue Marine Service, which also reported to him.

=== Revenue Cutter Service (1861–1866) ===
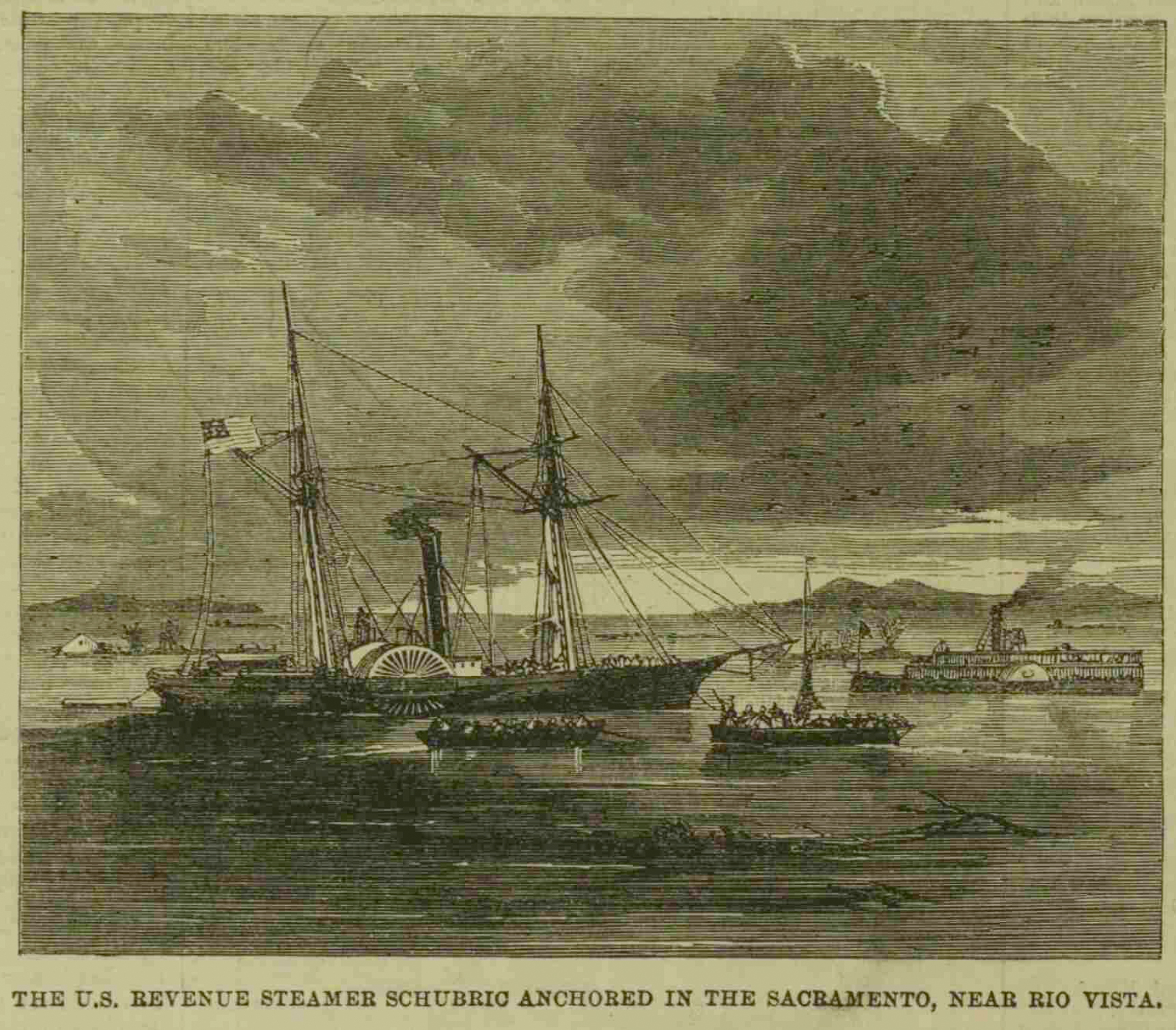
USRC Shubrick providing flood relief at Sacramento in January 1862

On 23 August 1861, Shubrick was transferred to the Revenue Marine Service. She was commissioned in her new service on 15 October 1861. Her homeport remained San Francisco, but her duties grew to include law enforcement and customs. She continued to service lighthouses.

When the American Civil War began in April 1861, the Union government had very few ships in the Pacific. While Shubrick was by no means a warship, she was armed and available, so she was put to limited military uses. There was little concern that a Confederate fleet might threaten the coast, but Confederate privateers were a concern that Shubrick was expected to defend against. She was also used periodically to transport military personnel, such as companies A and E of the 1st California Volunteer Infantry which she took from San Francisco to San Pedro in September 1861.

In January 1862 the Sacramento River flooded, damaging not only the city, but ranches and farms in the surrounding countryside. Shubrick was sent up the river to distribute relief supplies and to evacuate people who were in danger, ultimately taking aboard 34 refugees.

In July 1862 Shubrick was reassigned from San Francisco to Port Townsend. Revenue losses from smuggling were more threatening in Washington Territory, with nearby British Columbia, than they were at San Francisco.

==== Port Townsend incident (1862) ====
Shortly after Shubrick's arrival at her new station, in early August 1862, Victor Smith, the new collector of customs, arrived to take possession of the customhouse at Port Townsend. At this time there was concern that the Confederates might attempt to seize the West coast. Fearing that Smith might be a Confederate agent, Lieutenant James H. Merryman, acting collector, declined to turn over the property to Smith unless he presented his papers of authorization. The customs collector declined to furnish them. Instead, he went to Shubrick, selected an armed guard, returned to Merryman and demanded the customhouse be given up in fifteen minutes or it would be taken by force. A threatening attitude was assumed by the cutter, and her guns were trained on the port.

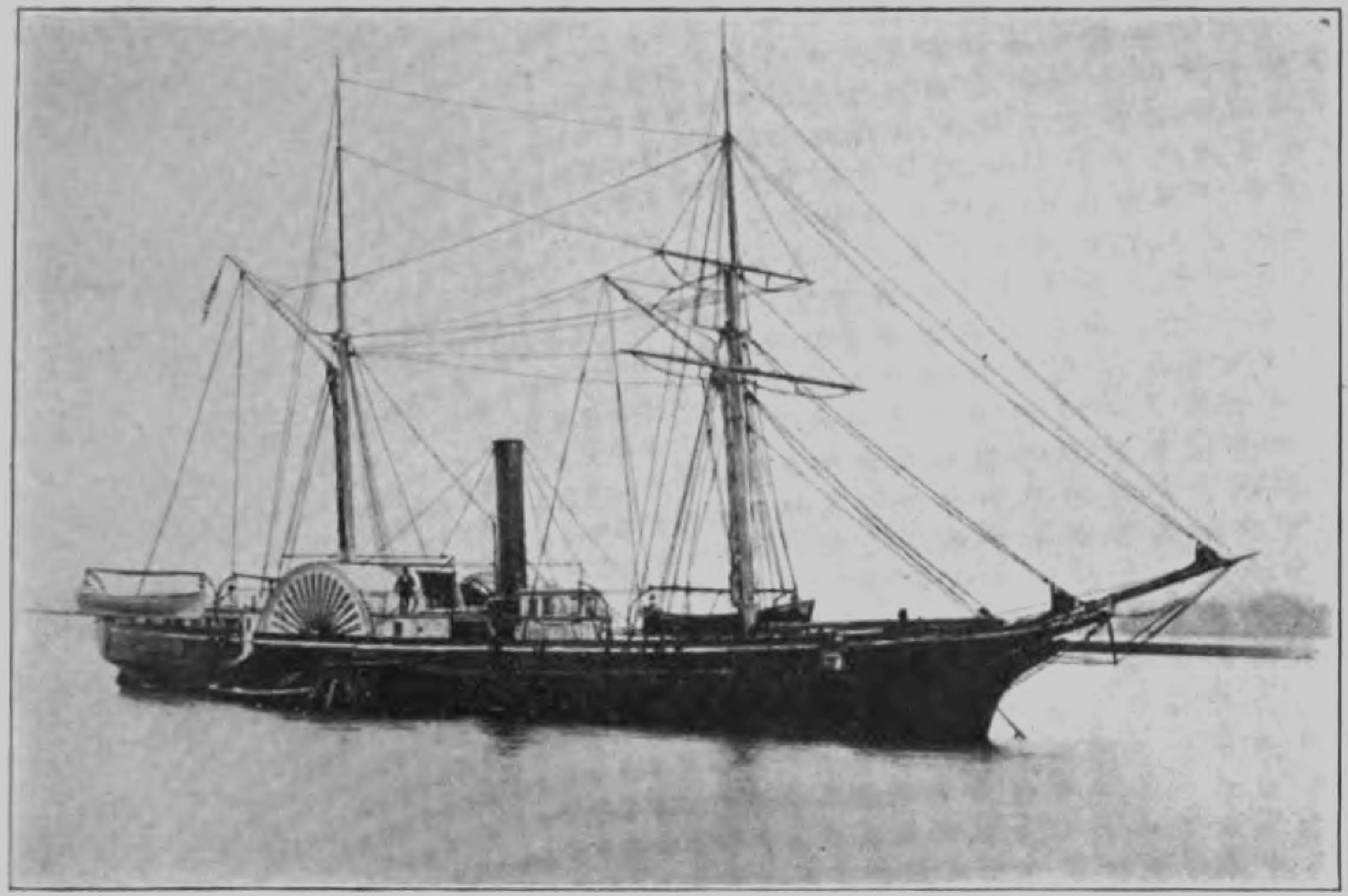
Shubrick at anchor

Lieutenant Merryman did not surrender to Smith, and instead turned over the customhouse records to Lieutenant Wilson of Shubrick, who gave him a receipt for the papers and placed them on board. The threat of a revenue cutter bombarding an American town caused a warrant to be issued for the arrest of Lieutenant Wilson and Victor Smith on 11 August 1862. When a United States Marshal boarded Shubrick to execute the warrant, Lieutenant Wilson refused to obey and sailed away. A month later the issue was resolved when both Smith and Wilson agreed to undergo an investigation.

Shubrick spent less than a year at Port Townsend, and arrived back in San Francisco in April 1863. USRC Saginaw replaced her in Puget Sound.

On 27 September 1863, Shubrick was dispatched to the aid of the Russian corvette Norvik, which had gone aground near Drake's Bay. The Russian ship was a wreck, but Shubrick brought 160 of her officers and men safely to San Francisco.

==== Western Union Telegraph Expedition (1865) ====
On 15 February 1865, Shubrick was transferred to the Navy Department for 90 days supporting survey operations conducted by Colonel Charles S. Buckley, for the Western Union Telegraph Expedition. She fitted out for this mission at the Mare Island Navy Yard in February 1865. She sailed from San Francisco on 7 March 1865 bound for Sitka, Alaska. Sailing north she stopped at Seattle, Victoria, and New Westminster, followed by a coaling stop at Nanaimo. Shubrick reached Sitka, then the capital of Russian America, on 1 April 1865. She exchanged 21-gun salutes with the fort, and courtesies with Governor Matsoukov. After disembarking the survey team, Shubrick sailed back to San Francisco, arriving on 20 April 1865.

=== Lighthouse Service (1866–1886) ===
Shubrick was returned to the Lighthouse Board on 24 December 1866. She was still the only lighthouse tender on the west coast of the United States, so she did all the jobs which were carried out by separate ships in more mature lighthouse districts. She placed and maintained buoys, supplied lighthouses with fuel and provisions, and carried supplies to build new lighthouses.

On 8 September 1867, while returning from transporting building materials to the Cape Mendocino Lighthouse, Shubrick ran aground 30 miles south of the site. For a time it appeared that the ship was a total loss, but her chief engineer, Thomas Winship, was able to save her through an elaborate salvage effort. She arrived back at San Francisco for permanent repairs in June 1868. Shubrick was rebuilt at the Mare Island Navy Yard. The work included not only the repair of the hull damage from the grounding, but a new boiler, and new paddle wheels. The cost of $162,399.12 was far more than the ship's original cost, which created conflict between the Navy and the Treasury Department. Shubrick was placed back in service in February 1869.

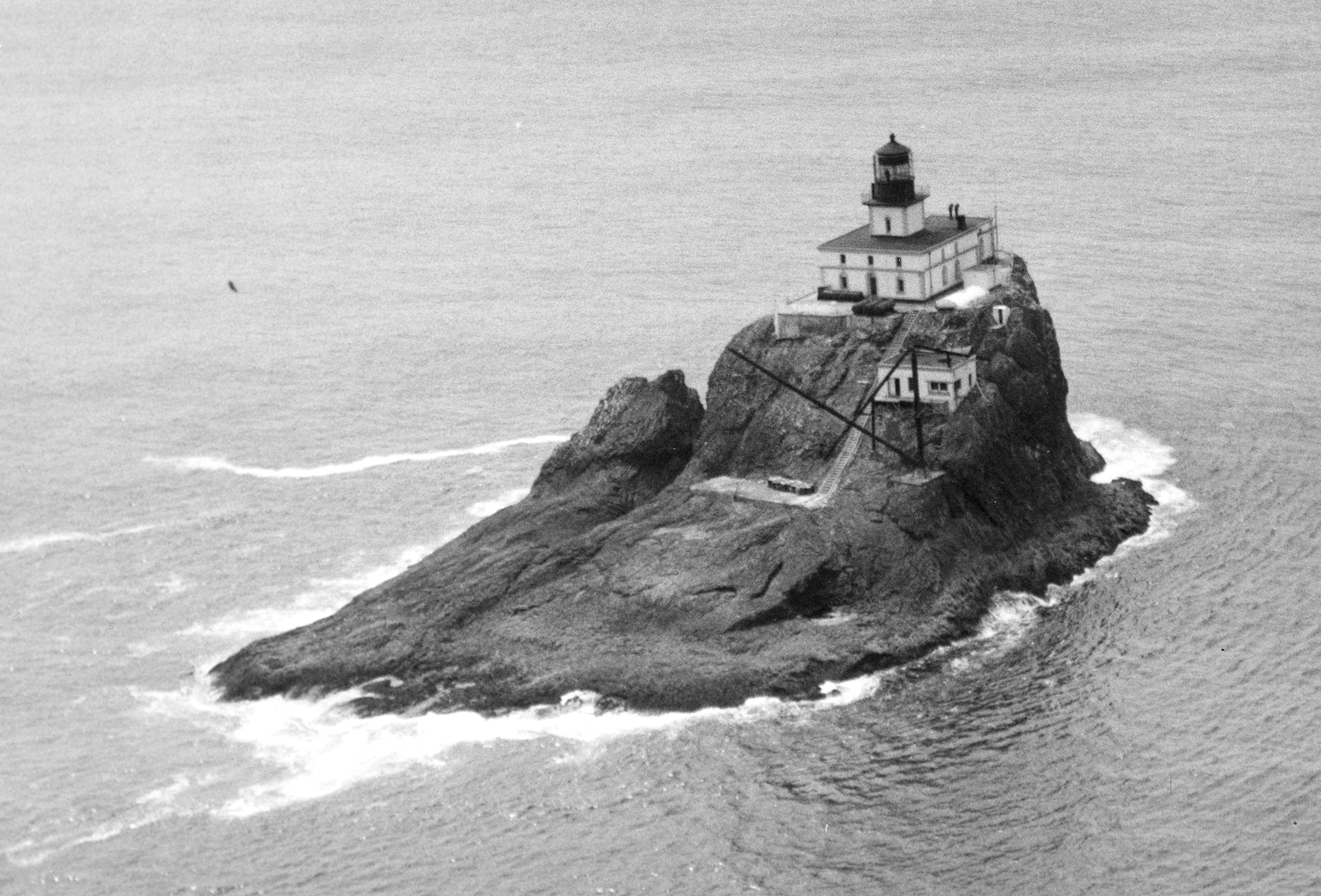
Shubrick delivered the first rock to construct the Tillamook Rock light in 1880

The Lighthouse Service grew after the Civil War, and as Shubrick was the only lighthouse tender available, she was involved in much of the expansion. For example, she landed the first 70 tons of rock for the construction of the Tillamook Rock lighthouse on 17 June 1880. She transported a new fog signal to Maury Island in 1884. The ship supplied construction materials for the Cape Blanco Light, Pigeon Point Light, Point Bonita Light, and Yaquina Head Light.

The Lighthouse Board requested Congress fund a second tender for the west coast in 1875, noting that the increase in buoys and lighthouses made it impossible for Shubrick to service the entire coast. It renewed this request annually until USLHT Manzanita arrived in January 1880. Manzanita was given responsibility for the 12th Lighthouse District, which at that time was just the coast of California. Shubrick was given a major overhaul at the cost of $15,566.04 and was transferred to the 13th Lighthouse District, which was composed of Oregon, Washington, and the newly-acquired territory of Alaska.

In 1882 the Lighthouse Board requested $100,000 to build a new tender to replace Shubrick which it characterized as "unseaworthy and not worth repairing." Congress ultimately agreed and Shubrick was taken out of service in December 1885. Her crew took over Manzanita as Shubrick's replacement in the 13th Lighthouse District. Manzanita was replaced in the 12th Lighthouse District by the newly-built USLHT Madrono.

== Sale and salvage of Shubrick ==
Shubrick was offered for sale at a public auction at Astoria, Oregon on 20 March 1886. She was sold for $3,200. Her new owner sent her to San Francisco, where she arrived on 24 April 1886. She was broken up there for salvage. Her hull was burned to recover the metal which fastened her timbers.
