= USS Shubrick =

USS Shubrick may refer to the following ships of the United States Navy:

- USS Shubrick (1865), a steamer transferred to the Navy Department 23 August 1861; returned by the Revenue Cutter Service to the Lighthouse Board in 1866
- USS Shubrick (TB-31), a torpedo boat commissioned 1901; renamed Coast Torpedo Boat No. 15, 1901; decommissioned, 1919
- USS Shubrick (DD-268), a Clemson-class destroyer commissioned in 1919; transferred to the Royal Navy where she served as HMS Ripley
- USS Shubrick (DD-639), a Gleaves-class destroyer commissioned in 1943 and decommissioned in 1945
