= Friendship of Salem =

Ship replica

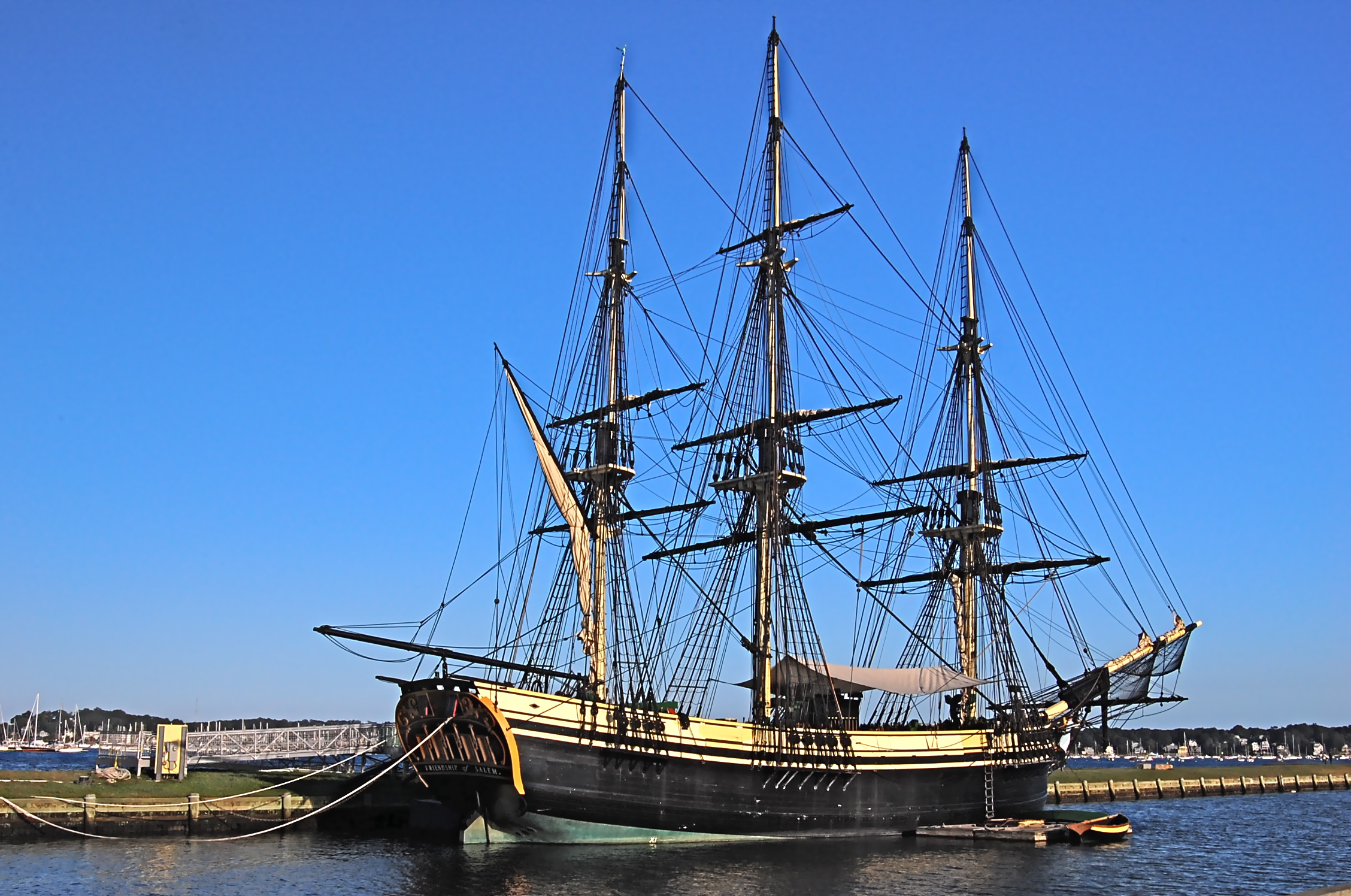
- Friendship of Salem, docked at the Salem Maritime National Historic Site

History

United States
- Name: Friendship of Salem
- Namesake: Friendship (1797)
- Owner: National Park Service
- Builder: Scarano Brothers Shipyard
- Launched: November 1996
- Acquired: September 1, 1998
- Home port: Salem, Massachusetts
- Identification: MMSI number: 367344050; Callsign: WDE3776
- Status: in service
- Badge: Woman in classical dress offering a bouqet of flowers

General characteristics
- Class & type: Full-rigged ship
- Length: 171 ft (52 m) bowsprit to spanker boom
- Beam: 30 ft (9.1 m)
- Height: 20 ft (6.1 m) keel to deck at midship
- Decks: main deck, 'tween deck, and holds
- Installed power: onboard generators
- Propulsion: 21 sails, twin diesel engines
- Speed: 7.2 maximum / 5.8 average knots
- Boats & landing craft carried: 1 jolly boat
- Complement: 25 crew, up to 45 persons

Friendship of Salem is a 171-foot (52 m) replica of the Friendship, a 1797 East Indiaman. It was built in 2000 in the Scarano Brothers Shipyard in Albany, New York. The ship usually operates as a stationary museum ship during most of the year. However, it is a fully functioning United States Coast Guard-certified vessel capable of passenger and crew voyages, which makes special sailings during various times of the year. The Friendship of Salem is docked at the Salem Maritime National Historic Site, established in 1938 as the first such site in the United States. The site, which includes several structures, artifacts and records, is operated by the National Park Service.

== Construction ==
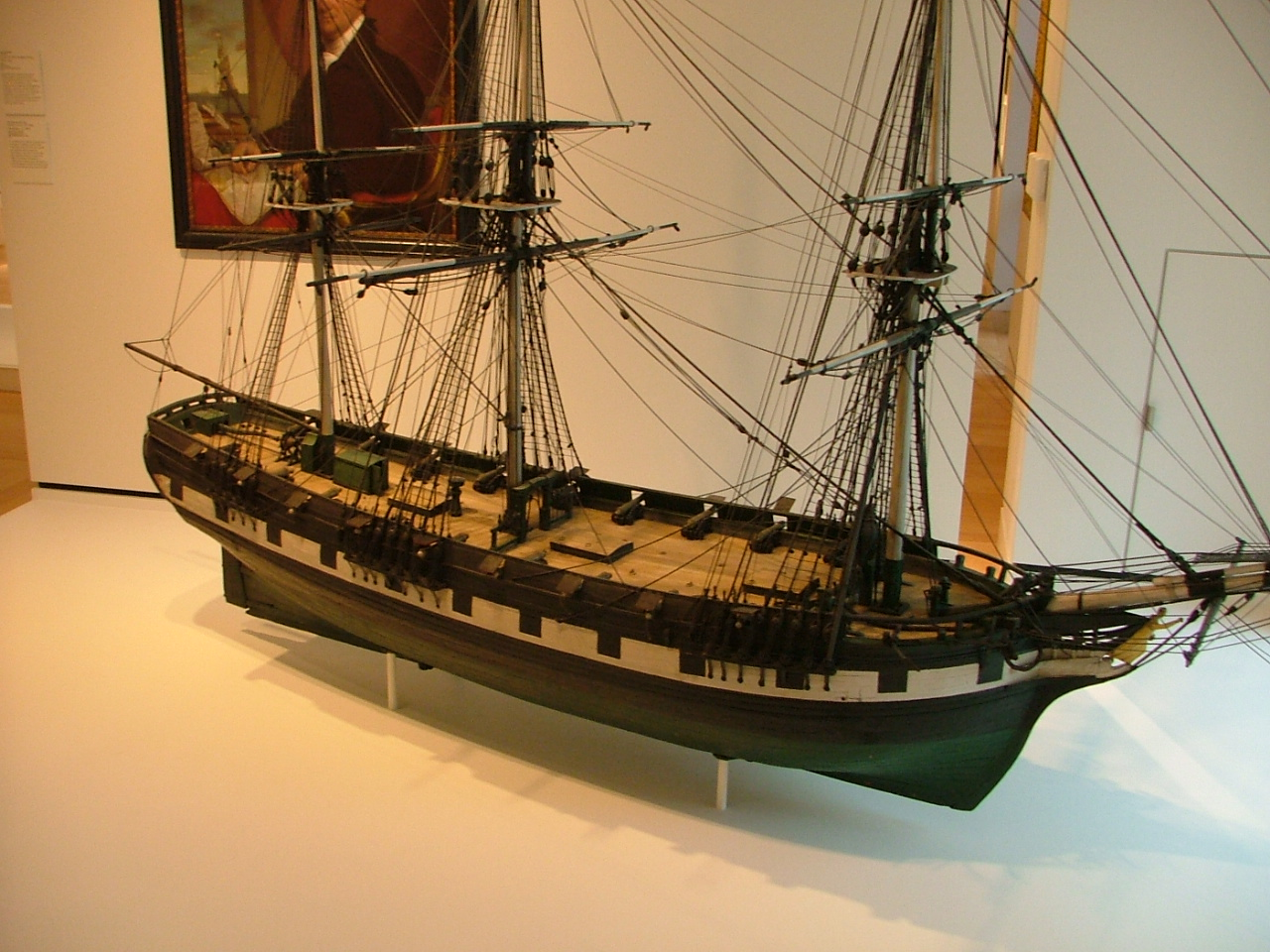
Model of the original Friendship at the Peabody Essex Museum

The replica of Friendship was commissioned by the National Park Service as The Friendship of Salem. It was built using modern materials and construction methods, while retaining the appearance of the original 18th-century ship. The hull is cold molded with laminated wood and epoxy. The replica's design is based on a model in the collections of the Peabody Essex Museum. The model was built by Thomas Russell, the Friendship's second mate, and Mr. Odell, the Friendship's carpenter, as a gift for Captain William Story's infant son. Russell and Odell made the model during a voyage to China and Sumatra from June 1802 to August 1804. The replica's color scheme was taken from an 1805 painting of the ship by noted marine artist, George Ropes, Jr., who was a nephew of Jerathmiel Peirce (see below). This painting is now in the collection of the Peabody Essex Museum in Salem.

== Operation ==
The ship is operated by a volunteer crew under supervision of the National Park Service. The Friendship of Salem sails as an ambassador ship for the Essex National Heritage Area.

== Friendship (1797) ==
The original Friendship was built in Salem, Massachusetts by Enos Briggs's shipyard at Stage Point on the South River for owners Aaron Waite and Jerathmiel Pierce. The Friendship was launched 28 May 1797. It weighed 342 tons and was registered at the customs house on August 18, 1797. The Friendship was 102 feet long and 27 feet 7 inches wide. She regularly recorded speeds of 10 knots and was known to have logged a top speed of 12 knots. The Friendship made fifteen voyages during her career and visited Batavia, India, China, South America, the Caribbean, England, Germany, the Mediterranean and Russia.

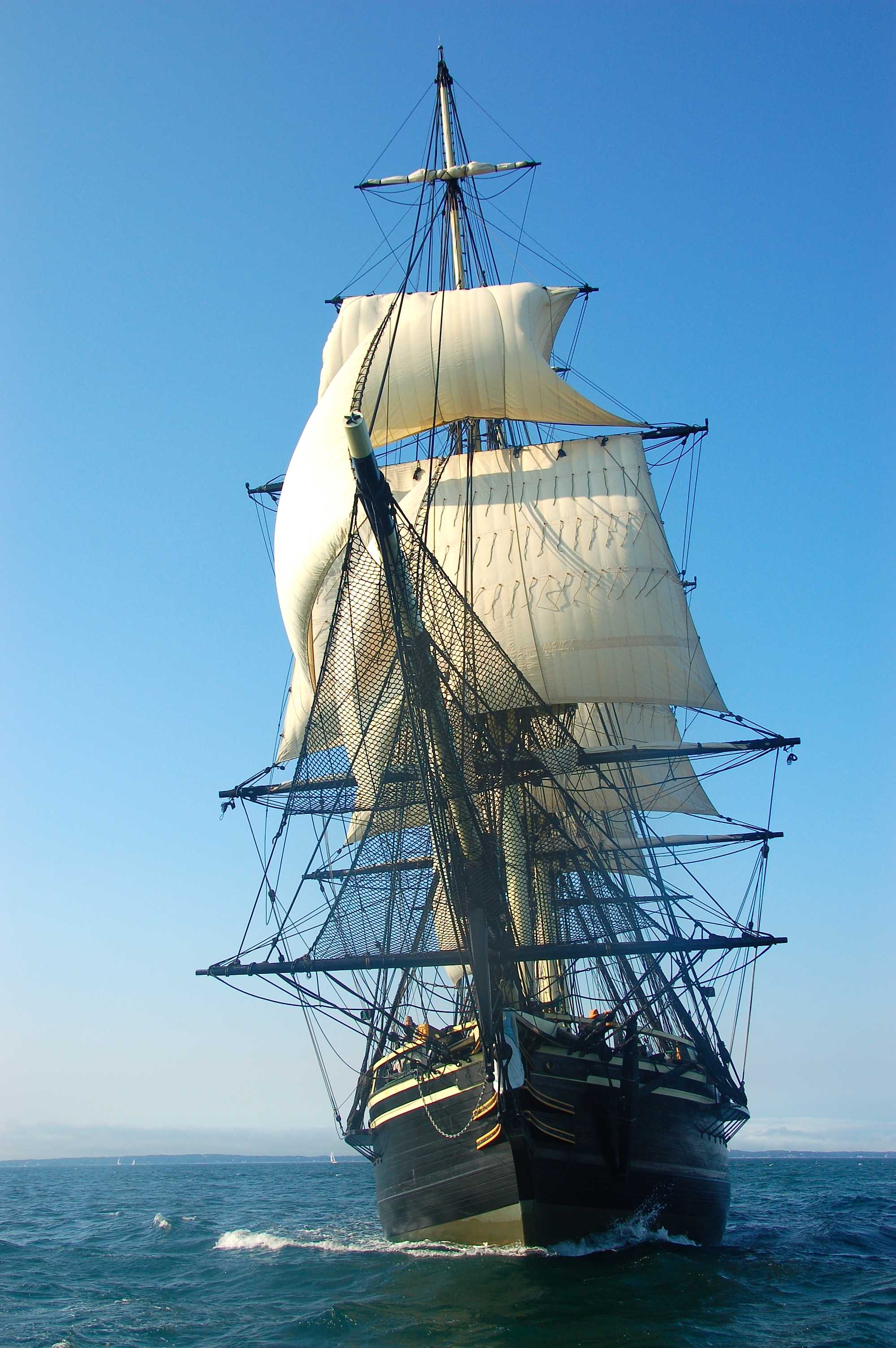
Friendship of Salem at sea.

The Friendship cleared Salem for Canton in August 1797 on her first voyage under the command of Captain Israel Williams, but changed her destination to Batavia in the Dutch East Indies. Captain Williams had a keen interest in science and was a member of the East India Marine Society. When the ship's supply of water gave out at 22°50′S 21°46′W, he improvised a way to distill water.

On her third voyage the Friendship was commissioned as letter of marque, an armed trading vessel authorized by congress to seize enemy ships as prizes of war. Although letters of marques were similar to privateers, their primary function was trade so they carried smaller crews. During its career as a letter of marque the Friendship carried thirty men and fourteen guns to fend off French privateers.

Captain William Story of Marblehead served as master of the Friendship from 1801 to 1804. Before he assumed command of the Friendship Story had served as her first officer on her first five voyages. Under his command the Friendship made voyages to Russia, Spain, Italy, China, Sumatra, and Batavia. The Friendship's voyage to Canton, China in 1803 was an exceptionally profitable one. While Story was in China with the Friendship in 1804, the artist Spoilum painted his picture.

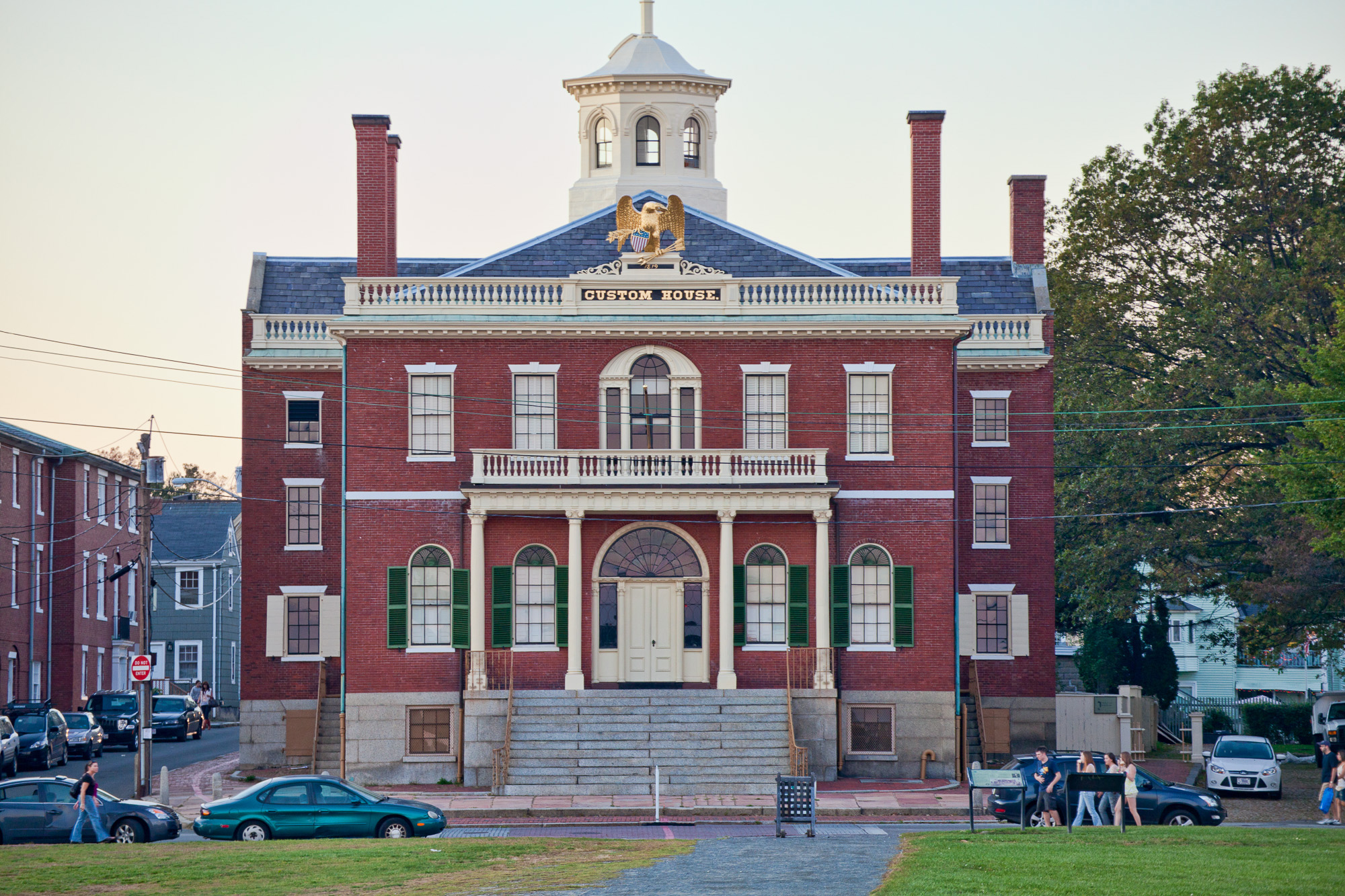
Custom House at the Salem Maritime National Historic Site

After the Embargo Act went into effect on December 22, 1807, the "Friendship" returned to Salem from the Mediterranean and did not leave port until it was lifted on March 1, 1809. For two years she sat at the wharf failing to generate any profits for Waite and Pierce. Having sat at the wharf for extended period of time the Friendship was in poor condition when Israel Williams set out for Gothenburg, Sweden. He barely made it to Cape Cod when he was forced to turn back to Salem because the Friendship was leaking. After she was repaired the Friendship made three voyages to Archangel Russia under Captain John Brookhouse and Captain Edward Stanley. Unfortunately for Stanley, she was captured as a prize of war by HMS Rosamond on September 5, 1812. Stanley did not know that the United States and Great Britain were at War. The Friendship was condemned as a prize of war in the High Court of Admiralty in London on December 7, 1812. Afterwards her fate is unknown because she disappears from the records. A full-rigged model of the original Friendship was donated to the Peabody Academy of Science.

== Friendship (1830s) ==
In 1815, Jerathmiel Pierce and Aaron Waite had a second ship with the same name constructed at Portland, Maine. This new Friendship weighed 366 tons and was registered at the customs house in Salem on January 6 of the following year. Three years later she was sold to George Nichols, Ichabod Nichols, Benjamin Pierce, Henry Pierce and Charles Saunders. In 1827 the vessel was purchased by Dudley L. Pickman, Nathaniel Silsbee, William Zachariah Silsbee and Richard F. Stone who employed the vessel in the pepper trade.

Charles Moses Endicott, master, anchored off the Sumatra town of Quallah Battoo in 1831. While Endicott and other officers were ashore engaged in the pepper trade, the first mate ignored the safety precautions the captain had instituted such as limiting the number of Malays allowed on board while loading pepper. Once Malay pirates had the crew distracted, they captured the ship, murdered some of the crew, and looted the cargo. Captain Endicott and the other officers on shore tried to return to the Friendship and render aid to the crew unsuccessfully, but were prevented by the superior number of Malay pirates. Next, they made their way to a nearby roadstead where the American vessels James Monroe, Palmer and Governor Endicott were lying at anchor. Once the captains of these vessels heard Endicott's story they hauled anchor and set sail to recover the Friendship.

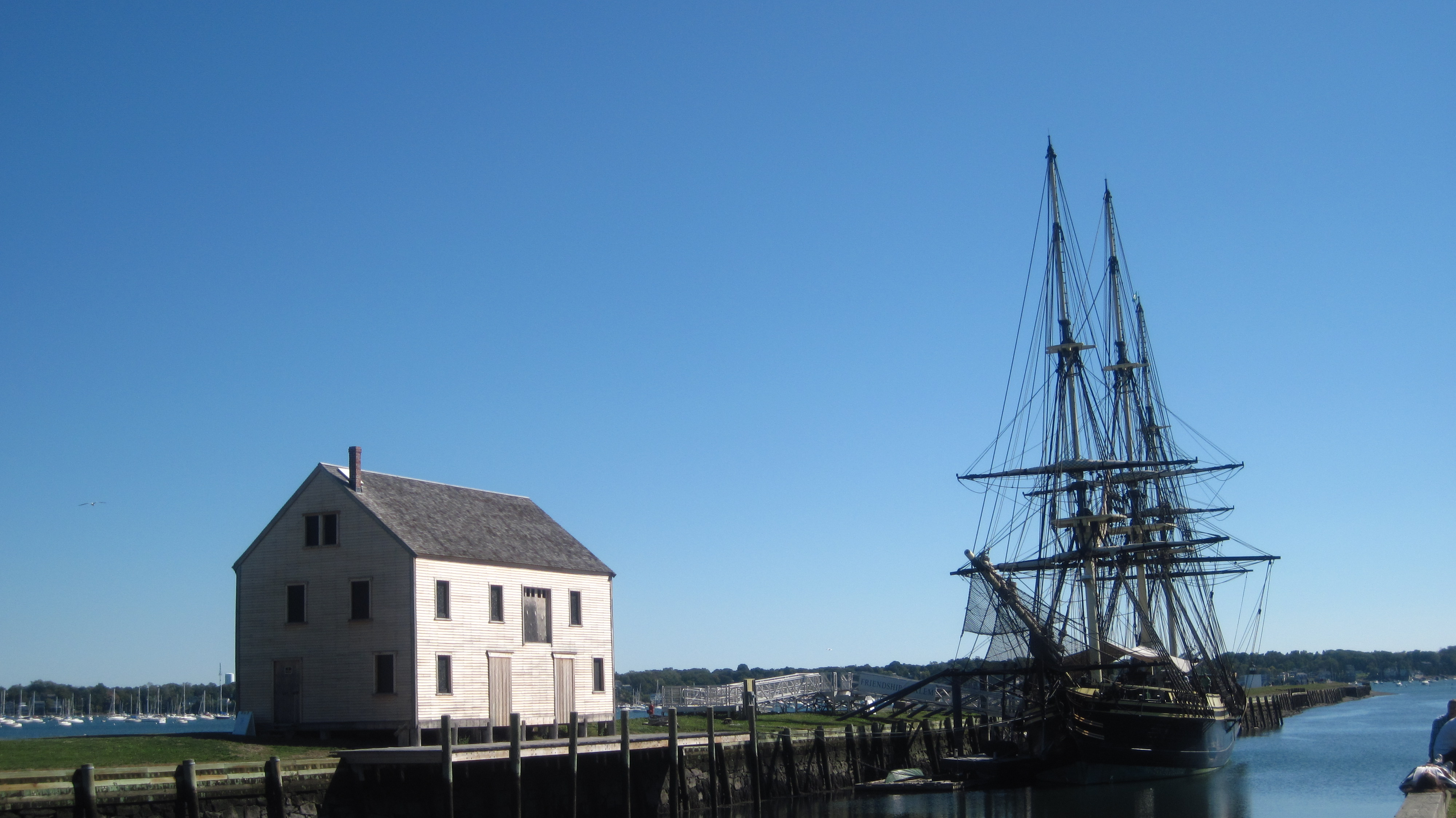

They had hoped to pull alongside the Friendship with the James Monroe and board, but the rescue party was forced to abandon their original plan and board the Friendship with small boats instead when they learned she was inside a dangerous shoal. Captain Endicott returned to Salem July 16, 1831.

Three days after the Friendship arrived in Salem her owners wrote President Andrew Jackson and demanded he take action against the Malay pirates at Quallah Battoo. Jackson dispatched the frigate USS Potomac to punish the pirates. Commodore John Downes departed New York with the frigate Potomac, her Bluejackets and Marines on the First Sumatran Expedition, to avenge the attack on Friendship – which also helped launch the diplomatic career of New Hampshire merchant Edmund Roberts.

The previous service and ultimate fate of this Friendship is unknown, but she is reported as having belonged to Joseph Peabody, a Salem merchant and shipowner who dominated trade between Massachusetts and the Far East for a number of years.

The Friendship of Salem is docked at the Salem Maritime National Historic Site - National Park Service who manages all U.S. national parks It was created on August 25, 1916, by Congress through the National Park Service Organic Act.

== See also ==
- List of large sailing vessels
- List of maritime museums in the United States
- List of museum ships
