= Augustus Kilty =

American Naval Officer

Augustus Henry Kilty
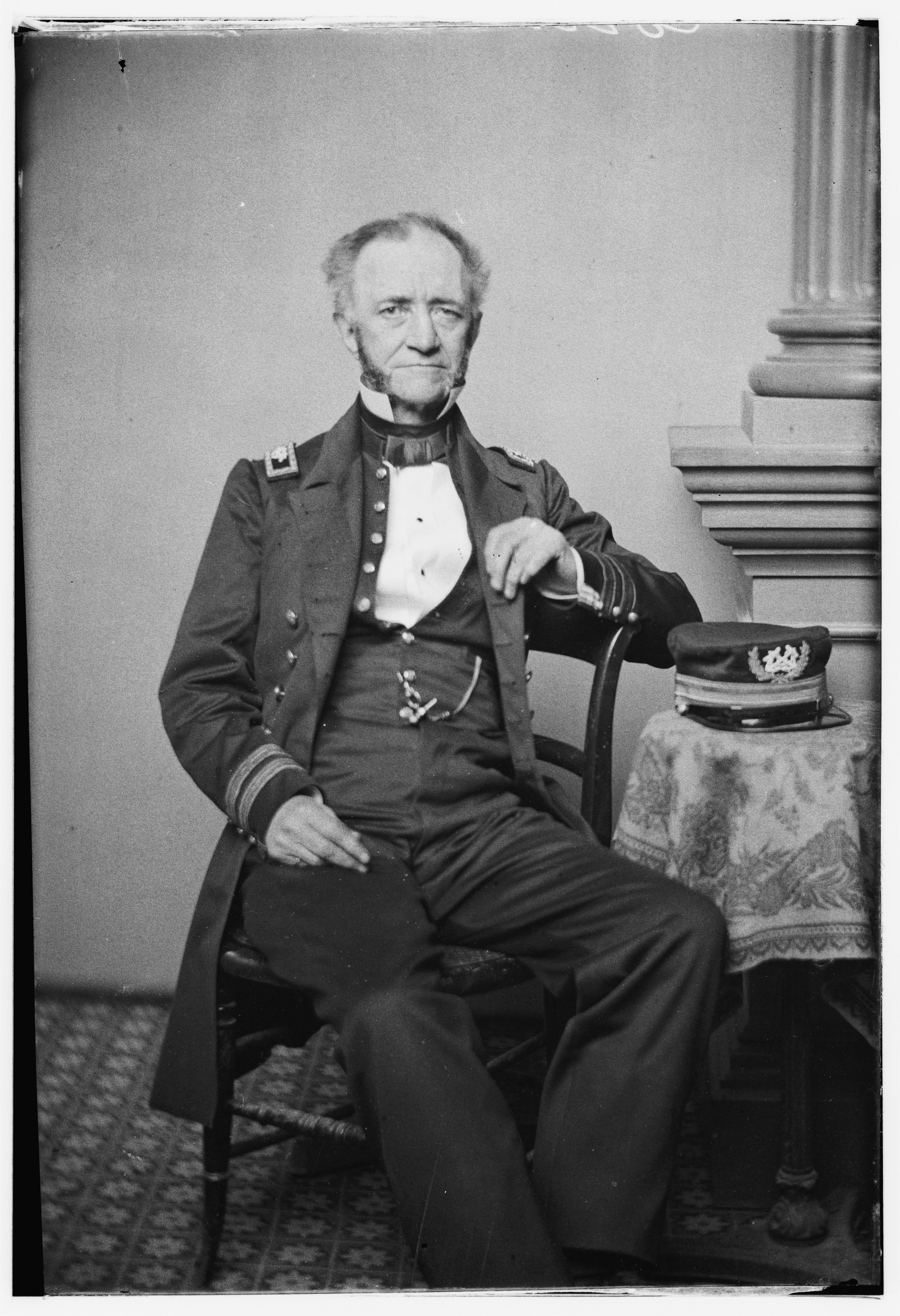
- Born: November 25, 1807; Annapolis, Maryland
- Died: November 10, 1879 (aged 71); Baltimore, Maryland
- Military career
- Allegiance: United States of America
- Branch: United States Navy
- Service years: 1821–1868
- Rank: Rear admiral
- Commands: USS Mound City; USS Roanoke
- Conflicts: Second Sumatran Expedition; American Civil War

Rear Admiral Augustus Henry Kilty (November 25, 1807 – November 10, 1879) was a United States Navy officer who served during the Civil War.

== Biography ==
Born at Annapolis, Maryland, Kilty was appointed midshipman on July 4, 1821. He served in the frigate Constellation in the West India Squadron from 1827, then in the frigate Hudson in the Brazil Squadron from 1829. Kilty was promoted to passed midshipman on April 28, 1832, and served aboard the schooner Grampus in the West India Squadron in 1832–34.

He was commissioned as a lieutenant on September 6, 1837, and served on the sloop John Adams in the East India Squadron, taking part in Commodore George Reid's operations in defense of American merchantmen at Quallah Batto in 1839. He then served on the frigates Columbus and United States in the Mediterranean Squadron between 1843 and 1848.

In 1850 he was stationed on the receiving ship at New York, and was at Baltimore a year later, returning to New York in 1855. Kilty was simultaneously promoted to commander on September 14, 1855, and placed on the Reserve List.

Kilty returned to the Active List on January 6, 1859, and was stationed in Baltimore in 1860 as a recruiting officer. From 1861 Kilty commanded the ironclad gunboat Mound City of the Mississippi Flotilla, and saw action at Island No. 10 and Fort Pillow. He commanded an expedition to White River, Arkansas, and during the operation, on June 17, 1862, was severely wounded, causing the loss of his left arm. Kilty received his commission as a captain on July 16, 1862, and spent the years 1863–64 on ordnance duty. He commanded the ironclad frigate Roanoke in the North Atlantic Squadron from 1864 to 1865, and was promoted to commodore on July 25, 1866, and served as the Commandant of the Norfolk Navy Yard.

Kilty was placed on the Retired List on November 25, 1868, and received promotion to rear admiral on July 13, 1870. He died on November 10, 1879.

== Namesake ==
The destroyer USS Kilty (DD-137), launched in April 1918, was named in his honor.
