= USS Bell =

Two ships of the United States Navy have been named USS Bell, in honor of Rear Admiral Henry Haywood Bell.

- USS Bell (DD-95), was a Wickes-class destroyer.
- USS Bell (DD-587), was a Fletcher-class destroyer from 1943 to 1946.

== See also ==
- USS Belle
- USS Jacob Bell
- USS J. Franklin Bell
