= Edmund P. Kennedy =

Edmund Pendleton Kennedy
- Born: 22 February 1780; Maryland
- Died: 28 March 1844 (aged 64); Norfolk, Virginia
- Military career
- Allegiance: United States
- Branch: United States Navy
- Service years: c.1795–1844
- Rank: Commodore
- Commands: USS Nonsuch; East India Squadron
- Conflicts: First Barbary War; War of 1812

Edmund Pendleton Kennedy (22 February 1785 – 28 March 1844) was an officer in the United States Navy and became the first commander-in-chief of the East India Squadron.

== Early life ==
Kennedy was born in Maryland in 1780. He lost his parents in his early life. He entered as a boy on board the frigate John Adams. At the Battle of Tripoli Harbor in 1804, in the First Barbary War, Kennedy was gunner's mate on board and was distinguished by his valor and intrepid ardor in the performance of duty. He was promoted to midshipman on 22 November 1805.

On 9 June 1810 Kennedy was promoted to lieutenant. Early in 1813 he was appointed to the command of the schooner Nonsuch, but was never permitted to go to sea. Transferred to the frigate Constellation at Norfolk ready for sea under Captain Charles Gordon. But Constellation was closely blockaded by a British Squadron and failed to get to sea. In April 1814, he moved to Lake Erie and was there until the end of the war. On 5 March 1817, he was promoted to master commandant, and to captain on 24 April 1828.

== East India Squadron ==
U.S. trade with the East Asia was limited, but for those who risked long voyage to trade fur, sandalwood, and cotton goods for Chinese silks and tea, the results were very profitable. Indeed, stories about the riches of Far East created the national myth about the vast potential of the China market. In an effort of turn the myth into reality, in 1835 President Andrew Jackson sent diplomatist Edmund Roberts in the Peacock commanded by lieutenant C. K. Stribling, accompanied by the U. S. Schooner Enterprise, Lieutenant Commanding A. S. Campbell, both under the command of Commodore Kennedy, to Chochin-China, thus established the East India Squadron.

Kennedy died on 28 March 1844.

Military offices
Preceded by none	Commander, East India Squadron; 3 March 1835–10 October 1837	Succeeded by George C. Read
