= Philip Voorhees =

Philip Falkerson Voorhees
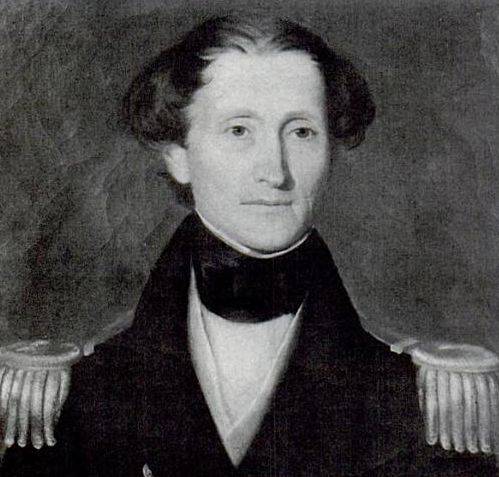
- Phillip Voorhees ca.1850
- Born: February 23, 1792; New Brunswick, New Jersey, US
- Died: February 23, 1862 (aged 70); Annapolis, Maryland, US
- Military career
- Branch: United States Navy
- Service years: 1809–1855
- Rank: Commodore
- Commands: Congress; East India Squadron
- Conflicts: War of 1812

Philip Falkerson Voorhees (23 February 1792 – 23 February 1862) was an officer in the United States Navy, who served during the War of 1812, and later commanded the East India Squadron.

== Biography ==
Voorhees was born in New Brunswick, New Jersey, the son of John Voorhees and Keziah Falkerson. He entered the navy as a midshipman on 15 November 1809, and was engaged in the War of 1812, taking part in the capture of HMS Macedonian by USS United States on 25 October 1812. He was also present at the capture of HMS Epervier by USS Peacock on 28 April 1814 for which he received a silver medal from congress, and promoted to a lieutenant on 9 December 1814.

He was promoted to a commander on 24 April 1828, and to a captain on 28 February 1838. He was assigned to command of the frigate Congress on her first cruise to the Mediterranean Sea in 1842. In December 1843, Voorhees joined Commodore Daniel Turner's Brazil Squadron blockading Montevideo in safeguarding U.S. trade during Uruguayan Civil War.

The U.S. Navy stayed aloof from lower-South American troubles. On 29 September 1844, however, Voorhees showed himself to be quick-tempered and impulsive. He captured an armed Argentine schooner that delivered a mail to the Argentine commanding officer. This overreaction damaged the US-Argentina relation.

He was tried by courts-martial in 1845 but the sentences of these courts were not approved. After a few months' suspension President Polk, in 1847, restored Voorhees to his full rank in the navy and gave him command of the East India Squadron on the flagship Plymouth. He returned in 1851.

In 1855 Voorhees was placed on the reserved list. At the opening of the American Civil War he urged his assignment to active duty, but, he died a few months afterward on 23 February 1862 in Annapolis, Maryland.

Military offices
Preceded by David Geisinger	Commander, East India Squadron; 1 February 1850–30 January 1851	Succeeded by John H. Aulick
