= David Geisinger =

- Born: 1790; Maryland, US
- Died: 1860 (aged 69–70); Philadelphia, Pennsylvania, US
- Military career
- Allegiance: United States
- Branch: United States Navy
- Service years: 1809–1855
- Rank: Commodore
- Conflicts: War of 1812

David Geisinger (1790 – 5 March 1860) was an officer of the United States Navy, who served during the War of 1812, and was later Commodore of the East India Squadron.

== Biography ==
Geisinger was born in Maryland in 1790 and was appointed midshipman in the United States Navy, on 15 November 1809. During the War of 1812, he was on board the sloop-of-war USS Wasp. On 21 September 1814, an eight-gun merchant brig, the Atalanta, ran afoul of Wasp, and was captured. Deemed too valuable to destroy, Atalanta was placed under the command of Midshipman Geisinger and was sent home to the United States. Geisinger arrived at Savannah, Georgia, safely on 4 November 1814. His good fortune was to escape from the fate of the Wasp, which was lost with all on board. He was promoted to lieutenant on 9 December 1814.

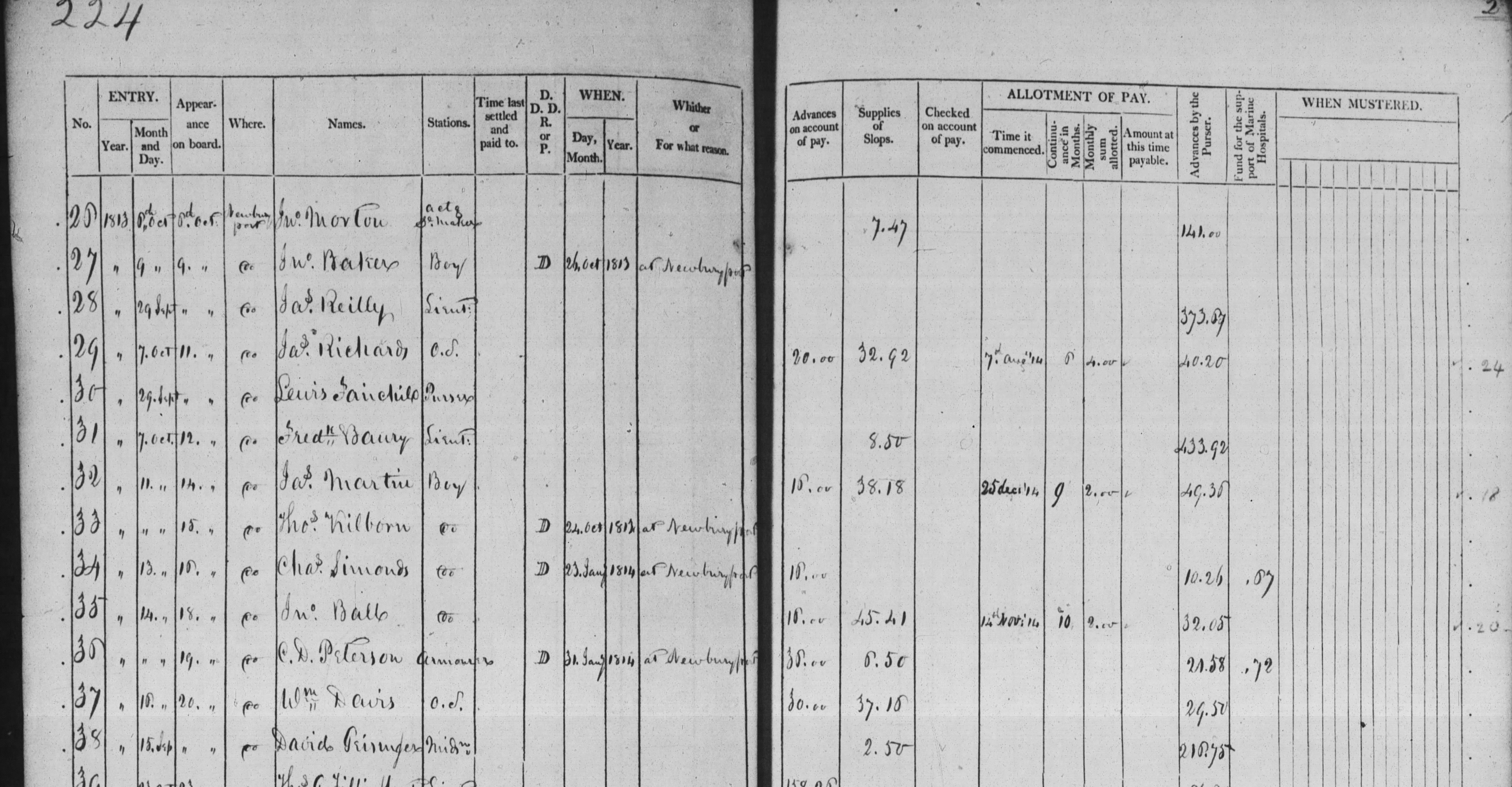
USS Wasp muster and payroll 1813 -1814, number 38, Midshipman, David Geisinger

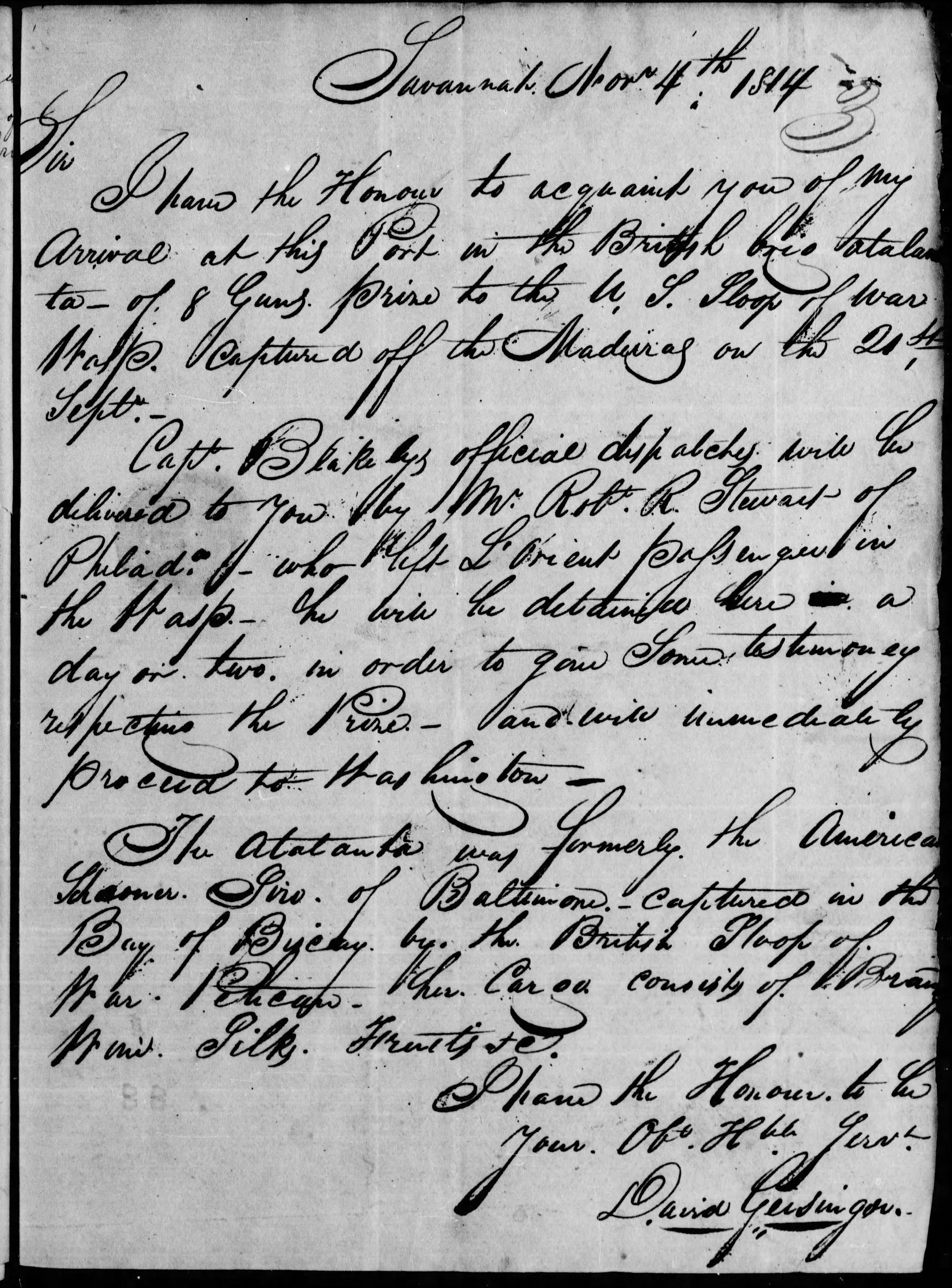
GEISINGER, DAVID 4 Nov 1814 re USS Wasp

In March 1829, Geisinger was promoted to a commander. As commanding officer of the USS Peacock, he carried the diplomat Edmund Roberts to Siam in March, and Muscat in September 1833, where Roberts negotiated treaties of amity and commerce with King Rama III and Sultan Said bin Sultan respectively.

Geisinger was promoted to captain on 24 May 1838. He commanded the East India Squadron from 1848 to 1850 as a Commodore. Geisinger learned from the Dutch consul about the imprisonment at Nagasaki of 18 American sailors from a wrecked whaler, and ordered Captain James Glynn of the USS Preble to go to Nagasaki, Japan. Glynn arrived on April 17, 1849, and insistently demanded the release of the prisoners, and threatened an intervention of the United States. With some help from the Dutch in the negotiations, the prisoners were finally delivered to him on April 26. He was the first American to negotiate successfully with Japan.

Geisinger's last assignment was at the Philadelphia Naval Asylum. He was placed on the retired list on September 13, 1855, and died in Philadelphia on March 5, 1860.

Military offices
Preceded by William Shubrick	Commander, East India Squadron; 13 May 1848–1 February 1850	Succeeded by Philip Voorhees
