= Second Sumatran expedition =

1838 US Navy punitive expedition

Coordinates: 3.5931°N 97.2221°E

- Part of the Sumatran expeditions
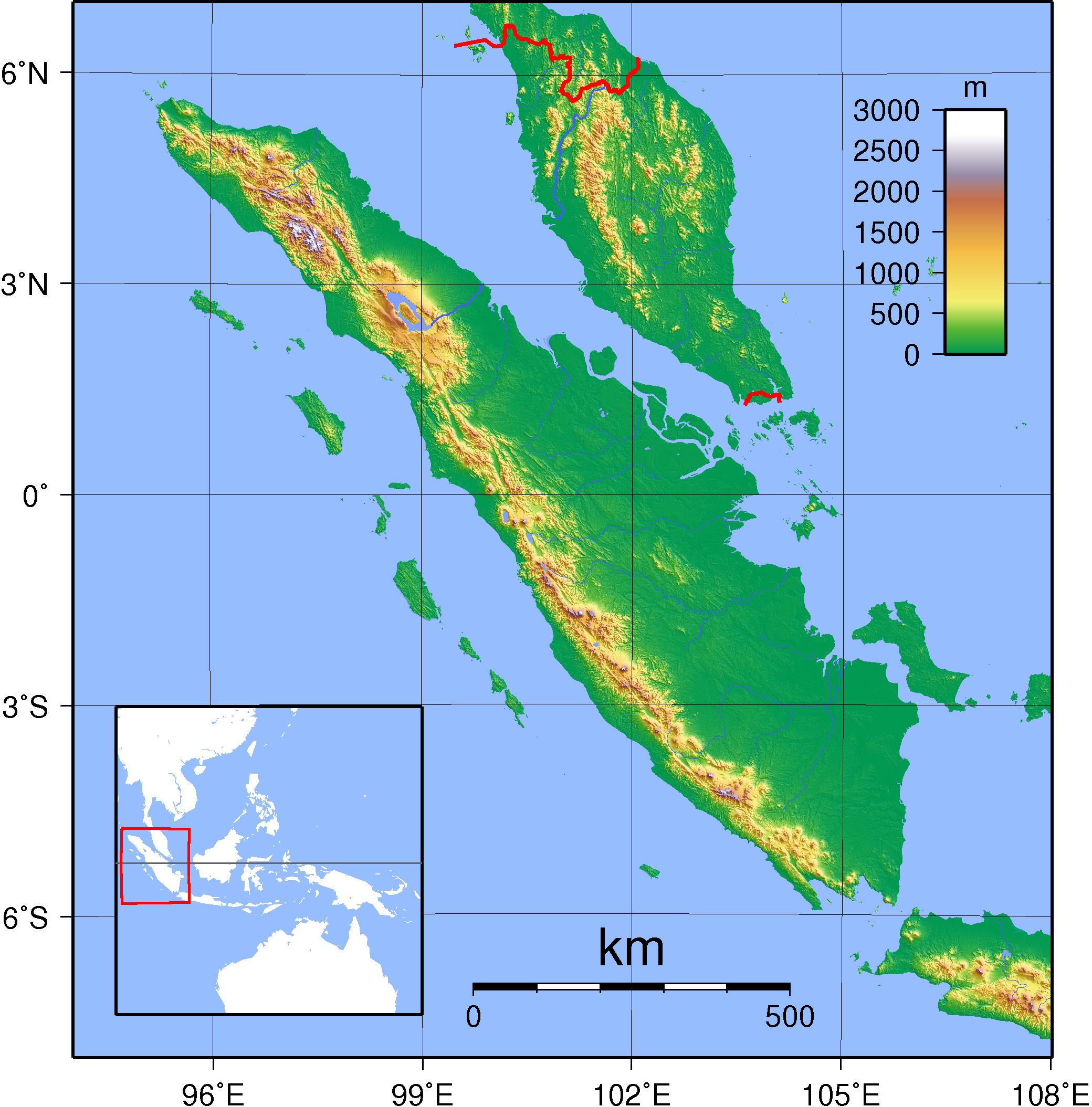
- Sumatra; conflict between Americans and Malays occurred in the northwestern region of the island.
Date	December 1838 – January 1839
Location	Meukek, Aceh Sultanate
Result	American victory: Malays cease attacks on American vessels

Belligerents
United States	Chiefdom of Quallah Battoo; Chiefdom of Muckie

Commanders and leaders
George C. Read; T.W. Wyman	Unknown

Strength
Land: 360 marine infantry and sailors Sea: 2 frigates	Several proas Unknown number of land units

Casualties and losses
Unknown	5 Forts and the Village of Muckie destroyed Town of Quallah Battoo Bombarded; Several proas destroyed Unknown number of soldiers and civilians killed

The Second Sumatran expedition was a punitive expedition by the United States Navy against inhabitants of the island of Sumatra. After Malay warriors or pirates had massacred the crew of the American merchant ship Eclipse, an expedition of two American warships landed a force that defeated the Acehnese in two short engagements.

== Background ==
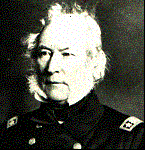
Commodore George C. Read led the expedition

In August 1838, the American trading vessel Eclipse was visiting the village of Terbangan, on South Aceh, when 24 Acehnese approached. The ship's second mate allowed the Acehnese to board after they relieved themselves of their weapons. A few moments later the Americans returned the Acehnese their weapons as a sign of friendship. The Acehnese, now rearmed with knives and other bladed weapons, attacked the crew. First they killed the second mate and then one by one the remaining men. Some of the American sailors jumped overboard but the Acehnese hunted them down and killed them. This was the second of such incidents. The massacre of the crew of the merchant ship Friendship by Acehnese had given rise to the first Sumatran expedition in 1832. News of the massacre reached Commodore George C. Read in December 1838 while he was sailing off Ceylon in command of the East India Squadron. Immediately Commodore Read in the frigate Columbia set sail southeast for Sumatra, together with the frigate John Adams. Columbia and John Adams were in the process of circumnavigating the globe in conjunction with, though not part of, the United States Exploring Expedition of 1838 to 1842. Coincidentally, the expedition to Sumatra required no detour. Columbia held almost 500 men on average and mounted 50 guns during the expedition. John Adams carried about 220 men and officers with 30 guns.

== Expedition ==
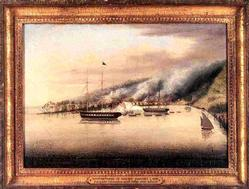
Bombardment of Muckie, 1 January 1839

The expedition arrived off southern Sumatra on 1 January 1839. The two American vessels first headed for Quallah Battoo. Once they had arrived, the two U.S. Navy vessels formed a line of battle just in range of five earth and wooden forts that protected the village and opened fire. Over an hour later all of the forts were destroyed or in shambles. The chief of the village surrendered and agreed never again to attack American ships. With this Commodore Read set sail for Labuhan Tarok Muckie, the next American objective. Columbia and John Adams arrived off Muckie the following day. The Americans landed a force of 360 officers, marines and sailors, all under the command of Commander T.W. Wyman of the Navy. Wyman's men attacked Muckie, while Columbia and John Adams provided covering fire with their cannons. Although most of the inhabitants fled their village upon the outbreak of fighting, some of the Malay men attempted to resist the attack but were overwhelmed. Within a short time, Muckie was in flames. The landing party then returned to their ships and sailed away. The punitive expedition ended after the Muckie engagement, and Commodore Read continued his cruise around the world. The second Sumatran expedition achieved what the first expedition had not. Casualties are absent from records.

== See also ==
- General Sherman incident
