= USS Kilty =

Wickes-class destroyer

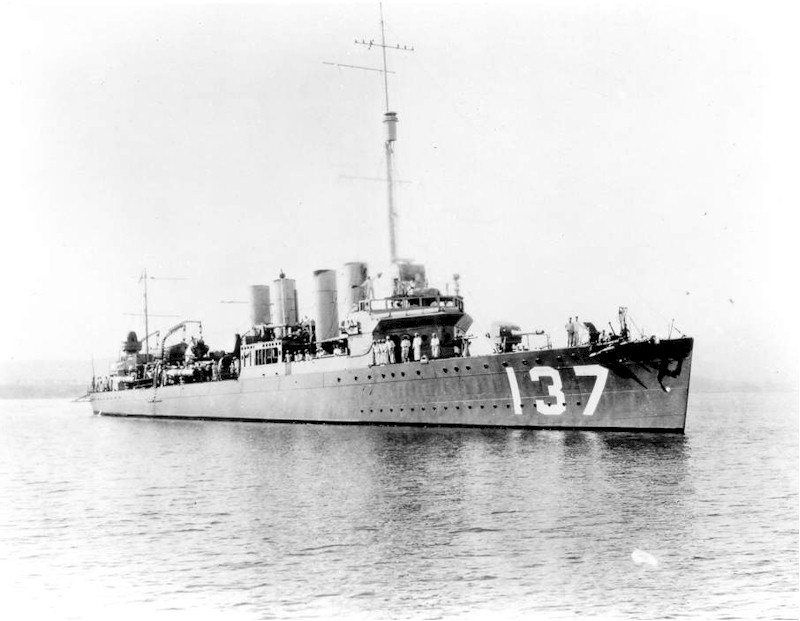
- USS Kilty (DD-137)

History

United States
- Namesake: Augustus Kilty
- Builder: Mare Island Navy Yard
- Laid down: 15 December 1917
- Launched: 25 April 1918
- Commissioned: 17 December 1918
- Decommissioned: 5 June 1922
- Recommissioned: 18 December 1939
- Decommissioned: 2 November 1945
- Reclassified: APD-15, 2 January 1943; DD-137, 20 July 1945
- Stricken: 16 November 1945
- Fate: Sold for scrapping, 26 August 1946

General characteristics
- Class & type: Wickes-class destroyer
- Displacement: 1,090 tons
- Length: 314 ft 5 in (95.83 m)
- Beam: 31 ft 9 in (9.68 m)
- Draft: 8 ft 6 in (2.59 m)
- Speed: 35 knots (65 km/h)
- Complement: 113 officers and enlisted
- Armament: 4 x 4 in (102 mm)/50 guns, 1 x 1-pounder. (0.454 kg)

USS Kilty (DD–137) was a Wickes-class destroyer in the United States Navy. She was the first ship named for Admiral Augustus Kilty.

Kilty was launched 25 April 1918 by the Mare Island Navy Yard, Vallejo, California; sponsored by Miss Elizabeth Harrison Shapley; and commissioned 17 December 1918.

== Service history ==
After a Caribbean shakedown and a European cruise during the summer of 1919, Kilty returned to San Diego and operated there until she decommissioned 5 June 1922.

=== World War II ===
Kilty recommissioned 18 December 1939, and in April 1940 sailed on Neutrality Patrol out of San Diego. During the summer, she conducted reserve training cruises and resumed her patrols early in September. The destroyer continued these operations until the United States entered World War II. Then, Kilty intensified ASW patrols, trained armed-guard crews for merchantmen, and escorted coastal convoys throughout 1942.

Reclassified APD-15 on 2 January 1943, Kilty cleared Mare Island 2 March for the South Pacific. After arriving Noumea 8 April with a Marine Raiders battalion, the transport steamed toward Guadalcanal as an ASW screen 28 April. She made similar cruises until June when she reported for patrol and escort duty in the Solomons. Kilty played a vital role in the conquest of the Solomons, landing troops of the 37th Division on New Georgia Island 30 June and 4 July. Continuing operations in the area, she made three reinforcement runs up the "Slot" during July and landed troops on Vella Lavella Island 15 August.

As Allied operations built up momentum, Kilty moved on to the Treasury Islands Campaign. She successfully landed New Zealand troops on Stirling Island 27 October and a Marine force on Bougainville 9 days later, enabling Allied Forces to bypass Rabaul. Kilty effectively aided this campaign in three more landings before sailing for Brisbane 21 November.

Returning Milne Bay in mid-December, the transport began preparing for the assault on the Bismarck Archipelago. Kilty landed units of the 7th Marine Regiment for the initial attack on Cape Gloucester, New Britain 26 December. Following two more landings there, she sent troops ashore at Saidor 2 January 1944 to take an air strip which would help the Air Force patrol and support Cape Gloucester. Kilty's next objective was Green Island, where she landed troops on 15 and 20 February before returning to Port Purvis on Florida Island in the Solomons.

Following an unopposed assault on Emirau Island 20 March, the transport prepared for the Hollandia campaign. Completing landings at Aitape 22 April, Kilty then participated in New Guinea landings, including Wakde 17 May and Biak 10 days later before putting into Humboldt Bay 28 May.

After a minor overhaul at Milne Bay, she landed troops on Cape Sansopor 30 July before sailing to Sydney. Returning to Humboldt Bay 30 August, Kilty landed troops on Morotai 15 September to complete her operations in New Guinea area. Kilty departed Hollandia 12 October as part of the spearhead for the giant Leyte assault that bore down on the enemy like a typhoon. In the advance assault force she landed rangers on Dinagat in the entrance to Leyte Gulf 17 October to pave the way for the main Philippine invasion. While Kilty was returning to Hollandia 23 October, the U.S. Fleet was crushing the Japanese Navy in the famous battle for Leyte Gulf.

During another cruise to Leyte in mid-November, the transport splashed two Aichi D3A "Vals" before they could crash into American LSTs. Continuing operations in the strategic Philippines, Kilty landed troops 15 December in the invasion of Mindoro, and on 11 January 1945 supported the Luzon landings. She made additional landings at Nasugbu 31 January and at Corregidor in mid-February before sailing for Ulithi 25 February for overhaul.

Battle-proven Kilty cleared Ulithi 2 April as escort to four escort carriers ferrying planes to the Okinawa beachhead. During May she made another escort cruise from Saipan to Okinawa, and on the 4th rescued survivors from Luce sunk during a kamikaze attack. With the Okinawa campaign well under way, Kilty departed Guam 17 May and arrived San Diego 18 June for overhaul. Redesignated DD-137 on 20 July 1945, Kilty was still in the yard as the war came to an end. The veteran destroyer decommissioned 2 November 1945, and was sold 26 August 1946 to the National Metal & Steel Corporation for scrapping.

== Awards ==
Kilty received ten battle stars for World War II service.

As of 2009, no other ship in the United States Navy has borne this name.
