= USS Chippewa (1815) =

US Navy brig

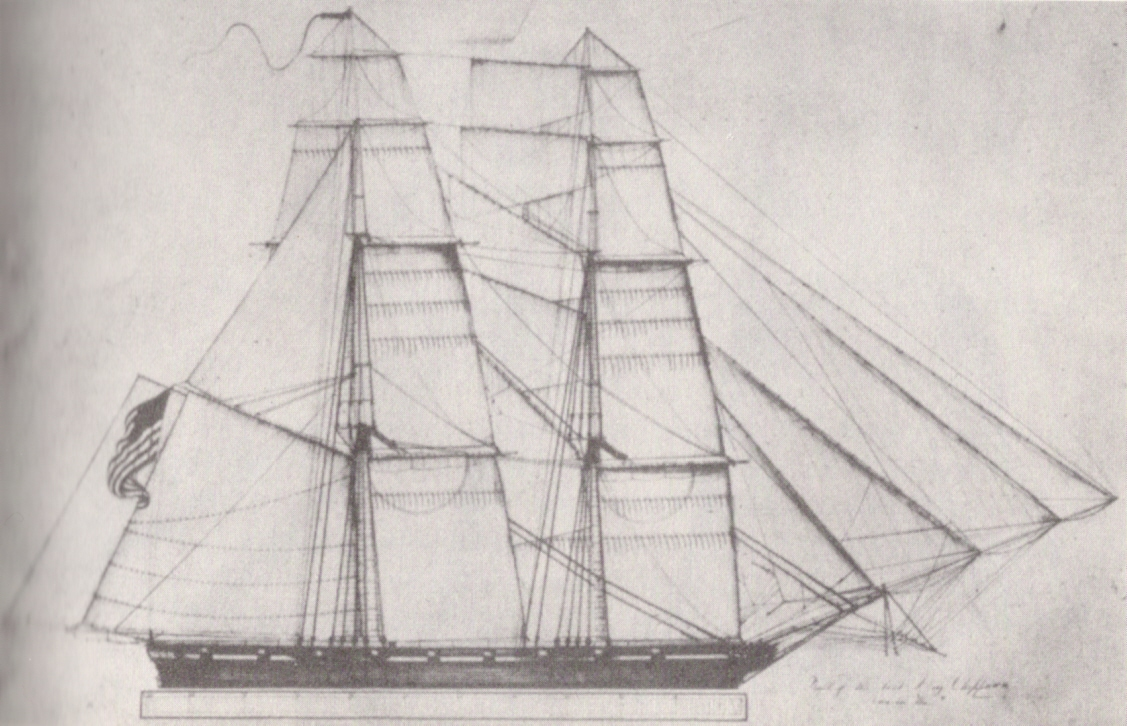
- Sail plan of USS Chippewa

History

United States
- Namesake: HMS Chippawa
- Builder: Caleb Carr, Warren, Rhode Island
- Laid down: 1814
- Launched: 25 March 1815
- Commissioned: July 1815
- Fate: Ran aground, 12 December 1816

General characteristics
- Displacement: 410 short tons (370 t)
- Length: Unclear
- Beam: Unclear
- Draft: Unclear
- Sail plan: Brig
- Complement: 90
- Armament: 14 × 32-pounder (15 kg) carronades; 2 × 12-pounder (5 kg) guns

USS Chippewa (also spelled Chippeway) was a 16-gun brig operated by the United States Navy. She was laid down in 1814 as part of a new strategy to directly challenge the Royal Navy and attack British trade during the War of 1812. The brig was completed after the war in 1815 and assigned to a squadron under the command of William Bainbridge during the Second Barbary War, but the conflict was resolved by the time the squadron arrived in the Mediterranean. In late 1816, she operated in the Gulf of Mexico to suppress illegal activity; on 12 December, she ran aground and sunk off Providenciales.

== Development and design ==
During the War of 1812, the United States' naval policy primarily relied on privateers to disrupt British maritime commerce. The privateers generally avoided engagements with the Royal Navy or its damaging blockade of the country to instead focused on British merchant ships. While individual attacks were successful, privateers were depended on their prizes and had limited capacity to carry captured goods. Combined with the public's celebration of the US Navy's victories against British warships, the Navy adopted a doctrine to attack both the British blockade and merchant ships. It built three 74-gun ships of the line and procured two squadrons of brigs and schooners—one commanded by Commodore David Porter and the other by Commodore Oliver Hazard Perry. The smaller vessels possessed maneuverability and armament comparable to those of privateers. However, unlike privateers, the warships could theoretically focus on destroying enemy vessels and challenge the Royal Navy without the need to take prizes.

The brigs built as part of the effort were USS Boxer, Saranac, and Chippewa; the latter's name was also spelled Chippeway. The trio were ordered on 14 November 1814, and Chippewa was built by Caleb Carr at Warren, Rhode Island, under the supervision of Perry. Details on her design are unclear. She was designed by Perry or William Doughty, and the plans of contemporary brigs are unlabeled and undisguisable from one another. Sources present differing measurements of Chippewa, although the Dictionary of American Naval Fighting Ships lists her armament as fourteen 32 lb (15 kg) carronades and two 12 lb (5.4 kg) cannons with a compliment of 90 and a displacement of 410 short tons (370 t).

== Service history ==
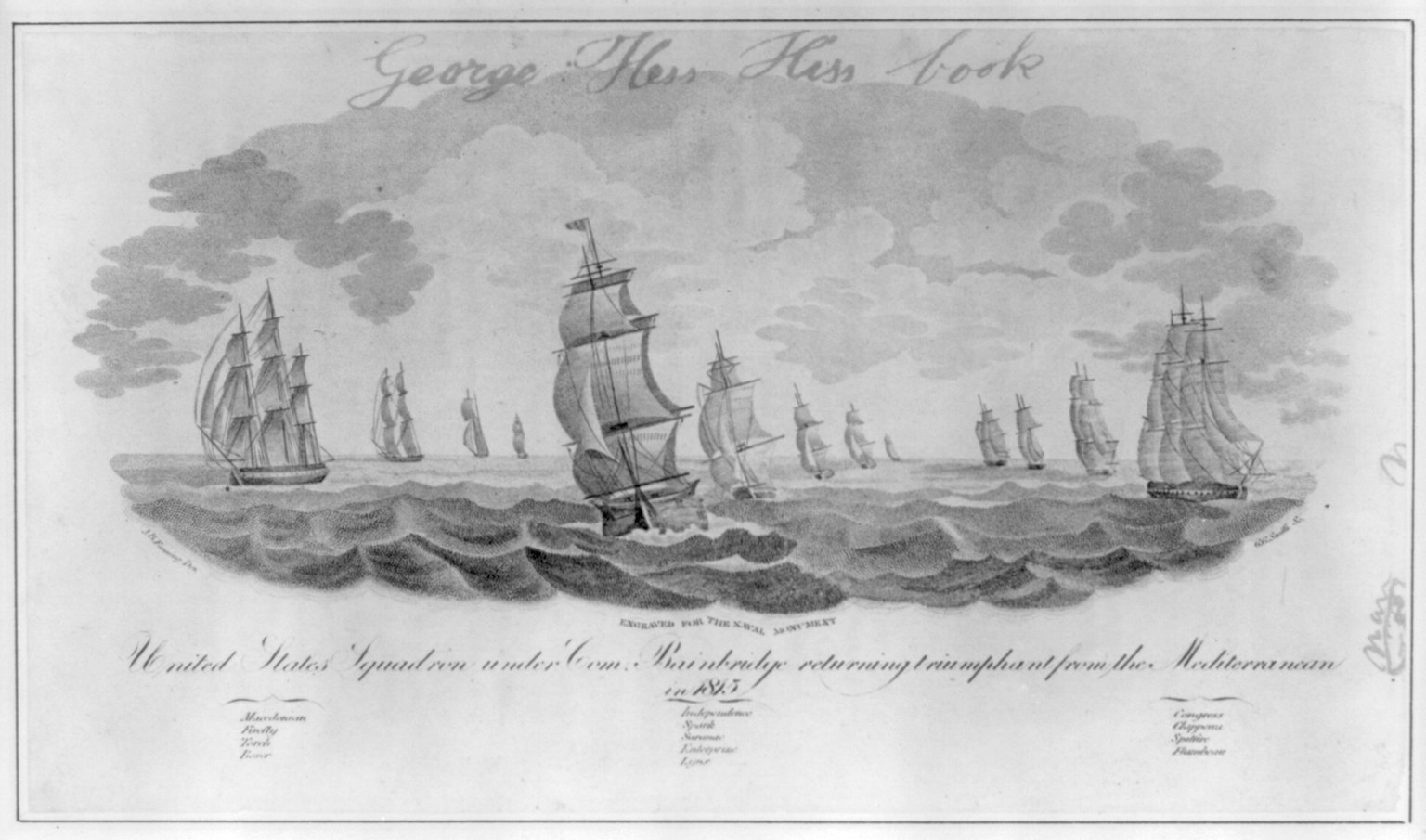
Chippewa, right, as a part of the Mediterranean squadron in 1815

Chippewa was laid down in 1814, launched on 25 March 1815, and commissioned in July. She was named after the capture of HMS Chippawa by Perry's forces during the Battle of Lake Erie. The War of 1812 had ended in February, and the Madison administration used revived American nationalism and the newfound peace to retaliate against Algerian corsairs and Dey of Algiers. The corsairs had attacked American merchants and held ten American sailors as slaves, and the Navy was tasked with freeing the men and signing a treaty with the Dey to stop further attacks. After she was launched, Chippewa sailed to New York City to be outfitted and manned. Under the command of Lieutenant George C. Read, she was attached to a squadron lead by William Bainbridge that included the ship-of-the-line Independence, sloop Erie, and schooner Lynx expecting to blockade Algiers. The ships left Boston for the Mediterranean on 3 July 1815, although a squadron under Commodore Stephen Decatur forced the Dey to accept American demands four days prior. Once they arrived, Decatur's force showed the flag in Algiers, Tripoli, and Tunis, only to find Decatur had already resolved conflict with all three. The two squadrons rendezvoused in October off Gibraltar, and the 18 ships formed the largest American fleet in the ever formed in the Mediterranean at the time. Chippewa set sail on 6 October for Boston, where she was placed in ordinary.

== Wreck ==
On 27 November 1816, she left Boston, ordered to join the frigate Congress in the Gulf of Mexico to suppress piracy and the slave trade. On 12 December, she ran aground uncharted reef northwest of Providenciales and sank. Her entire crew was rescued.

In 2008, a U.S. expedition supported by the National Oceanic and Atmospheric Administration searching with representatives of Turks & Caicos Islands seeking Trouvadore, a Spanish slave ship that wrecked in 1841 in the same area, found the wreck of Chippewa. They had found wreckage of a wooden ship in 2004, and 2008 was the third field season. Chippewa was identified by the unique 32-pounder carronade armament.

The U.S. team was also seeking the wreckage of the USS Onkahye, another 19th-century ship that conducted anti-piracy/anti-slavery patrols; it was lost in 1848 in that area.
