= USS Bell (DD-95) =

Wickes-class destroyer

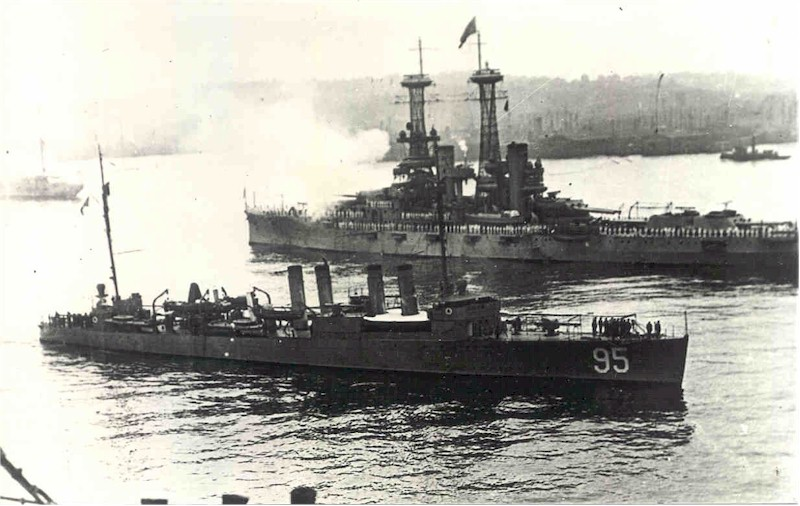
- USS Bell (DD-95)

History

United States
- Namesake: Henry H. Bell
- Builder: Bethlehem Shipbuilding Corporation, Fore River Shipyard, Quincy, Massachusetts
- Cost: $1,369,775.92 (hull and machinery)
- Laid down: 16 November 1917
- Launched: 20 April 1918
- Commissioned: 31 July 1918
- Decommissioned: 21 June 1922
- Stricken: 25 January 1937
- Fate: Sold, 18 April 1939

General characteristics
- Class & type: Wickes-class destroyer
- Displacement: 1,202–1,208 long tons (1,221–1,227 t) (standard); 1,295–1,322 long tons (1,316–1,343 t) (deep load)
- Length: 314 ft 4 in (95.8 m)
- Beam: 30 ft 11 in (9.42 m)
- Draught: 9 ft 10 in (3.0 m)
- Installed power: 27,000 shp (20,000 kW); 4 water-tube boilers
- Propulsion: 2 shafts, 2 steam turbines
- Speed: 35 knots (65 km/h; 40 mph) (design)
- Range: 2,500 nautical miles (4,600 km; 2,900 mi) at 20 knots (37 km/h; 23 mph) (design)
- Complement: 6 officers, 108 enlisted men
- Armament: 4 × single 4-inch (102 mm) guns; 2 × single 1-pounder AA guns; 4 × triple 21 inch (533 mm) torpedo tubes; 2 × depth charge rails

USS Bell (DD-95) was a Wickes-class destroyer built for the United States Navy during World War I.

== Description ==
The Wickes class was an improved and faster version of the preceding Caldwell-class. Two different designs were prepared to the same specification that mainly differed in the turbines and boilers used. The ships built to the Bethlehem Steel design, built in the Fore River and Union Iron Works shipyards, mostly used Yarrow boilers that deteriorated badly during service and were mostly scrapped during the 1930s. The ships displaced 1,202–1,208 long tons (1,221–1,227 t) at standard load and 1,295–1,322 long tons (1,316–1,343 t) at deep load. They had an overall length of 314 feet 4 inches (95.8 m), a beam of 30 feet 11 inches (9.4 m) and a draught of 9 feet 10 inches (3.0 m). They had a crew of 6 officers and 108 enlisted men.

Performance differed radically between the ships of the class, often due to poor workmanship. The Wickes class was powered by two steam turbines, each driving one propeller shaft, using steam provided by four water-tube boilers. The turbines were designed to produce a total of 27,000 shaft horsepower (20,000 kW) intended to reach a speed of 35 knots (65 km/h; 40 mph). The ships carried 225 long tons (229 t) of fuel oil which was intended gave them a range of 2,500 nautical miles (4,600 km; 2,900 mi) at 20 knots (37 km/h; 23 mph).

The ships were armed with four 4-inch (102 mm) guns in single mounts and were fitted with two 1-pounder guns for anti-aircraft defense. Their primary weapon, though, was their torpedo battery of a dozen 21 inch (533 mm) torpedo tubes in four triple mounts. In many ships a shortage of 1-pounders caused them to be replaced by 3-inch (76 mm) anti-aircraft (AA) guns. They also carried a pair of depth charge rails. A "Y-gun" depth charge thrower was added to many ships.

== Construction and career ==
Bell, named for Rear Admiral Henry H. Bell, was launched 20 April 1918 by Bethlehem Shipbuilding Corporation, Fore River Shipyard, Quincy, Massachusetts; sponsored by Mrs. Josephus Daniels, wife of the Secretary of the Navy, Josephus Daniels, and commissioned 31 July 1918.

On 5 August 1918 she damaged the steam lighter Cornelia in a collision. Cornelia had to be beached on Deer Island, in the harbor at Boston, Massachusetts. From August to November 1918 Bell convoyed troop ships across the North Atlantic and in December formed part of the escort for George Washington carrying President Woodrow Wilson from New York to Brest, France. Bell continued serving with the Atlantic Fleet until placed in reserve in June 1920. She was decommissioned at Portsmouth Navy Yard 21 June 1922. Bell remained out of commission until August 1936 when she was declared in excess of the limits imposed by the London Naval Treaty of 1930 and reduced to a hulk. She was subsequently sold.
