= USS Onkahye =

History

United States
- Name: Onkahye
- Builder: William Capes
- Laid down: 1839
- Launched: 1840
- Acquired: 1843
- Commissioned: 1843
- Fate: Wrecked 1848

General characteristics
- Tons burthen: 250
- Length: 96 ft (29 m)
- Beam: 22 ft (6.7 m)
- Draft: 12 ft (3.7 m)
- Armament: 2 guns

USS Onkahye was a topsail schooner of the United States Navy. A unique ship in the American Navy under sail, the vessel occupied a significant place in ship development, being the only converted sailing yacht to serve on a distant station before the American Civil War. Its design was influential and it is considered the model for modern American sailing yachts.

While serving in the anti-piracy/anti-slave trade patrols in the Caribbean, it went down in 1848 off East Caicos, in the Turks and Caicos Islands. A NOAA-supported expedition in 2008 conducted field work in search of the Onkahye and the USS Chippewa, also known to have gone down in that area in 1816.

== History ==
Onkahye, a schooner yacht of a radical design by Robert L. Stevens, was laid down in 1839 by William Capes, Williamsburg, New York, opposite the Brooklyn Navy Yard. After it was launched in 1840, the Navy purchased it in early 1843 and converted it to a warship. It was commissioned at Gosport Navy Yard, Virginia, 11 July 1843, with Lt. William C. Whittle in command. Because of its speed, the schooner's design strongly influenced the development of modern American sailing yachts.

Departing Norfolk 23 October 1843, Onkahye spent its first commission as a dispatch vessel in Charleston, South Carolina, returning to Norfolk 18 June 1844. It was decommissioned two days later. It was recommissioned on 10 April 1845 and sailed on 9 May for duty in the Caribbean and the West Indies. It was among the ships on anti-piracy/anti-slave trade patrols, as the United States and Great Britain had worked cooperatively since 1808 to suppress the international slave trade.

It sailed to Vera Cruz, Mexico, to unload passengers, moved on to Cuba, and then returned to Norfolk 14 July. Onkahye sailed for the West Indies again on 11 September. It remained on duty in those waters and along the northern coast of South America until it sailed from Mobile Bay on 8 November 1845 for Norfolk, where it arrived on 1 January 1846. Onkahye was decommissioned on 9 January.

Onkahye was recommissioned 22 April 1847, Lt. Otway Berryman commanding, and sailed for Caribbean waters once again before the month was out. Cruising the West Indies and South American coast, the schooner put into Rio de Janeiro 22 November 1847 and stayed there until 29 January 1848. Onkahye captured the bark Lawrence, a heavily laden slaver, at that port 24 January 1848.

== Fate ==
Onkahye continued its patrols in the West Indies until it was lost off Caicos Reef on 21 June 1848 without loss of life.

== Post-script ==
In 2008, underwater archaeologists, sponsored by NOAA and the Museum of Turks & Caicos, added Onkahye to the list of ships they were searching for. They had already located and identified the wrecks of the Spanish slaver Trouvadore, which sank in 1842, and USS Chippewa (1815), which sank in 1816.
