= Trouvadore =

Spanish slave ship

History
- Fate: Wrecked March 1841

Trouvadore was a Spanish slave ship that was shipwrecked in 1841 near East Caicos in the course of a run transporting Africans to be illegally sold to the sugarcane plantations in Cuba. As the United Kingdom had a treaty with Spain prohibiting the international slave trade and had abolished slavery in its colonies in 1833, it freed the 192 slaves who survived the wreck. Individuals and families, a total of 168 Africans, were placed with salt proprietors for apprenticeships in the Turks and Caicos Islands; the remaining 24 Africans were settled in Nassau.

== Voyage of Trouvadore ==
Slave trading was illegal in Spain, as the country had outlawed the slave trade and had a treaty with the United Kingdom to that effect. However, governors in Cuba often turned a blind eye to the trade, as they believed slave labour was integral to the profitability of the sugarcane plantations producing their most important commodity crop. The exact route of Trouvadore is not known, but the records state that new crew members were picked up in São Tomé, a Portuguese colony off the coast of Africa that still legally traded enslaved Africans.

The exact number of Africans loaded onto Trouvadore is not recorded but would have been around 280–300. When the ship wrecked off East Caicos in March 1841, all the 20 crew members and 193 Africans aboard survived. This suggested that around 100 slaves had died during the Atlantic crossing, a typical loss for a venture of this kind. At East Caicos, a number of the Africans fled into the bush; one of the crew shot a woman dead.

As the United Kingdom had abolished slavery in its West Indies colonies effective 1834, the colony residents knew that the Africans should be freed. In 1841, East Caicos was a large deserted island. Residents from the neighbouring island of Middle Caicos gave the first assistance to the crew and Africans, and notified authorities on Grand Turk Island, the political capital of the Turks and Caicos. The authorities dispatched British soldiers to secure the crew and bring all the survivors back to Grand Turk whilst a decision was made on the Africans' future. Residents from Middle Caicos had disarmed the Spanish crew before the arrival of Lt. Fitzgerald with his men; he arrested them without need for force.

On Grand Turk, the ship's crew were placed under armed guard; they were eventually taken to Nassau where they were given to the custody of the Cuban consul, who took them to Cuba for prosecution. Authorities placed 168 Africans with local salt proprietors. Adults and older children were put into a one-year apprenticeship to learn to process salt, nearly the only source of work on the island. All the Africans were baptised and taught English. As these 168 individuals increased the small colonial population by 7%, they strongly influenced the developing society and culture, adding a level of renewed Africanization. Descendants of these free Africans have formed a large part of the Turks and Caicos population.

== Modern interest in Trouvadore ==
This story was long forgotten until Grethe Seim, the founder of the Turks and Caicos National Museum in 1991, and Dr Donald Keith started searching in the US for objects from the Turks and Caicos. On a visit to the Smithsonian, they discovered a 19th-century letter book written by Grand Turk resident George Judson Gibbs, containing letters he had written in the late 1870s while trying to sell some of his artifacts to the institution. His pieces included two 'African Idols' from a Spanish slaver that wrecked off East Caicos in 1841. (He sold the two works to the American Museum of Natural History in New York, which identified them as kava kava dolls made only on Easter Island in the Pacific, 3,512 kilometres (2,182 mi) west of the coast of Chile.

Research was begun, and scholars found the account of Trouvadore in the British National Archives. Due to the state of the records, there was initially confusion of Trouvadore with Esperanza (Hope), a Portuguese slaver that had sunk in 1837 at the Caicos.

Since 2000, Nigel Sadler, former director at the Turks and Caicos National Museum (2000–2006), has been one of the chief scholars to explore the story of Trouvadore and its legacy. His research has placed the story of Trouvadore into Turks and Caicos Islands history, as well as the larger context of the illegal slave trade, British military intervention in capturing slave ships and aiding the Africans liberated from the vessels, and British relations with Spanish Cuba, where economic growth fueled the demand for the importation of illegally captured Africans as slaves.

Records show that regional authorities asked the local residents to send a list with the English names assigned to each African. Scholars have not yet found this register, but it would be important for identifying the free ancestors of many descendants in Turk and Caicos, and Nassau.

== Search for the wreck ==
Marine archeologists searched for the shipwreck and artifacts during three field seasons. In 2004, a survey located a wooden wreck in the right location. In 2006, a test excavation was carried out, but no diagnostic material was found. In 2008, the third field season, a cooperative effort was made with a multi-disciplinary expedition of the United States NOAA, which was also searching for two American navy vessels, USS Chippewa and USS Onkahye. They had sunk in the waters of the Turks and Caicos Islands whilst on 19th-century anti-piracy/anti-slavery patrols in the Caribbean.

According to a Reuters article, on 26 November 2008, marine archaeologists claimed to have found the remains of Trouvadore slave ship off the coast of the Turks and Caicos Islands. They believe that its artifacts, including hull timbers, establish it as the Spanish ship. The wreck that is thought to be Trouvadore is also known as the "Black Rock Wreck." The team also found one of the American ships, which appears to be Chippewa, lost in 1816. Further fieldwork is planned.

Historians and anthropologists are working to place Trouvadore and the liberation of its 192 Africans in the context of settlement of the Turks and Caicos, efforts by the UK to prohibit the international slave trade, and UK relations with Cuba and Spain.
