= James Armstrong (naval officer) =

United States Navy officer 1794–1868

Commodore James Armstrong
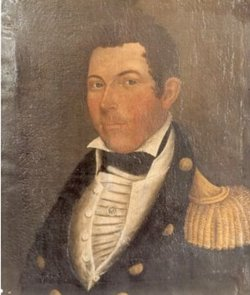
- Born: January 17, 1794; Shelbyville, Kentucky, US
- Died: August 27, 1868 (aged 74); Salem, Massachusetts, US
- Burial place: Harmony Grove Cemetery
- Military career
- Branch: United States Navy
- Service years: 1809 – 1861
- Rank: Commodore
- Commands: East India Squadron; Pensacola Navy Yard
- Conflicts: War of 1812 Second Opium War: Battle of the Pearl River Forts

Commodore James Armstrong (17 January 1794 – 27 August 1868) was an officer in the United States Navy.

Armstrong joined the United States Navy as a midshipman in 1809 and served on the sloop-of-war Frolic when it was seized by the British in 1814 during the War of 1812. Promoted to commodore and given command of the East India Squadron in 1855, Armstrong served aboard the squadron's flagship, San Jacinto during the Second Opium War. Following the battle of the Pearl Forts, Armstrong's health began to fail and he returned to the United States.

In 1860 Armstrong was given command of the Pensacola Navy Yard. On January 12, 1861, two days after Florida voted to secede from the Union he surrendered the facility to the secessionists.

Captain Armstrong was Court Martialed on May 4, 1861. "The proceedings of Captain Armstrong's court martial appears to be missing from the rest of the proceedings deposited in the National Archives so the testimony surrounding exactly what happened that day between Conway and Renshaw that lead to the Court submitting a communication to Welles is unavailable. Conway eventually got "some appropriate mark of approbation" bestowed in 1939 and 1942 when hulls DD-70 and DD-507 were named in his honor." - General Naval Order

Armstrong was born in Shelbyville, Kentucky. He died in Salem, Massachusetts at the age of 74 and is buried in the Harmony Grove Cemetery.

Military offices
Preceded by Joel Abbot	Commander, East India Squadron; 15 October 1855–29 January 1858	Succeeded by Josiah Tattnall III
