= USS Bell (DD-587) =

Fletcher-class destroyer

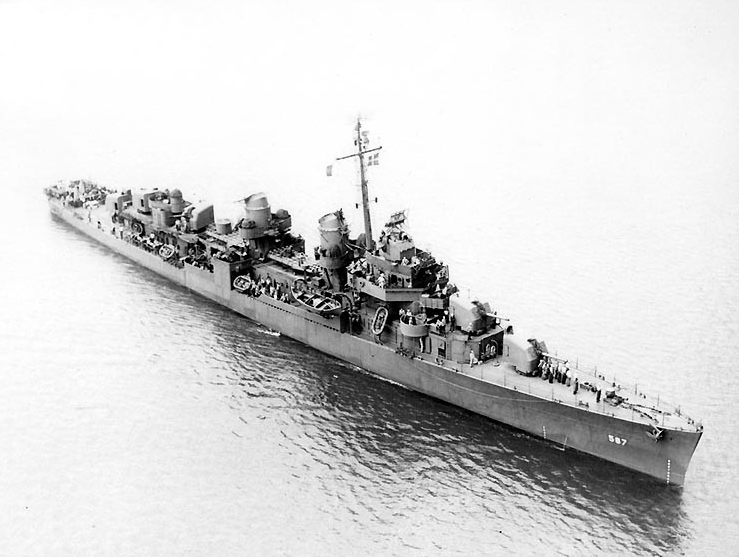
- USS Bell (DD-587) in June 1943.

History

United States
- Namesake: Henry H. Bell
- Builder: Charleston Navy Yard
- Laid down: 30 December 1941
- Launched: 24 June 1942
- Commissioned: 4 March 1943
- Decommissioned: 14 June 1946
- Stricken: 1 November 1972
- Fate: Sunk as target, 11 May 1975

General characteristics
- Class & type: Fletcher-class destroyer
- Displacement: 2,050 tons
- Length: 376 ft 6 in (114.7 m)
- Beam: 39 ft 8 in (12.1 m)
- Draft: 17 ft 9 in (5.4 m)
- Propulsion: 60,000 shp (45,000 kW); 2 propellers
- Speed: 35 knots (65 km/h; 40 mph)
- Range: 6500 nm at 15 kn (12,000 km at 28 km/h)
- Complement: 329
- Armament: 5 × 5-inch 38 caliber guns, 4 × 40 mm AA guns, 4 × 20 mm AA guns, 10 × 21 inch (533 mm) torpedo tubes, 6 × depth charge projectors, 2 × depth charge tracks

USS Bell (DD-587) was a Fletcher-class destroyer of the United States Navy, the second Navy ship named for Rear Admiral Henry H. Bell (1808–1868).

== Construction and commissioning ==
Bell was launched 24 June 1942 by Charleston Navy Yard; sponsored by Mrs. Clea Cooke Hulse, great-grandniece of Admiral Bell; and commissioned 4 March 1943.

== Service history ==
Until November 1943 Bell operated on patrol and escort in the North Atlantic, making one voyage to Britain in August. She got underway for the Pacific 6 November and arrived at Pearl Harbor 27 November. Bell then joined Task Force 58 (TF 58) for strikes on Kavieng, New Ireland, (25 December 1943, 1 and 4 January 1944); the invasion of Kwajalein, Marshall Islands, (29 January – 2 February); Truk strike (17–18 February); Marianas raid (21–22 February), Carolines strike (30 March – 1 April), Hollandia landings (21–24 April); Saipan invasion, (12–24 June); 1st Bonins raid (15–16 June); Battle of the Philippine Sea (19–20 June); 2nd Bonins raid (24 June); 3rd Bonins raid (3–4 July); Guam invasion (21 July); Western Carolines raids (25–28 July); 4th Bonins raid (4–5 August); Palau raids (6–8 September); Philippine Islands raids (9–24 September); Okinawa raid (10 October); and with TF 38 in the Formosa raids (12–17 October).

Bell formed part of the escort of Houston and Canberra from off Formosa to Ulithi (15–29 October). She then rejoined the 3rd Fleet for strikes against Luzon (5 November – 16 December) and the invasion of Lingayen Gulf, Luzon (4–18 January 1945).

During the late evening of 31 January 1945 while in 13°20' N., 119°20' E., she joined O'Bannon and Ulvert M. Moore in sinking the Japanese submarine Ro-115. Bell returned to Puget Sound Navy Yard for repairs, arriving 27 February. She departed the west coast 22 April and arrived at Leyte 29 May. From there she steamed to the Brunei Bay (7–10 June) and Balikpapan, Borneo, (1–3 July) landings. Bell patrolled and escorted convoys in the Philippines until the end of the war and then served on occupation duty at Okinawa, China, and Korea until 14 December 1945 when she left for San Francisco, arriving 4 January 1946.

Bell was placed out of commission in reserve 14 June 1946, and joined the San Diego Group, Pacific Reserve Fleet. She was stricken from the Naval Vessel Register 1 November 1972, and sunk as target 11 May 1975.

== Awards ==
Bell received twelve battle stars for her participation in World War II.
