= Oliver O'Brien =

American military officer (1839–1894)

Oliver Albert O'Brien
- Born: c. 1839; Boston
- Died: October 1, 1894 (aged 54–55)
- Burial place: Oak Hill Cemetery, Gloucester, Massachusetts
- Military career
- Allegiance: United States
- Branch: United States Navy
- Rank: Acting master's mate
- Unit: (United States Navy) USS John Adams (Note: One source, the book Record of Medals of Honor..., states that O'Brien was serving on the USS Canandaigua, not John Adams, at the time of his Medal of Honor action.)
- Conflicts: American Civil War
- Awards: Medal of Honor

Oliver Albert O'Brien (c. 1839 – October 1, 1894) was a Union Navy sailor in the American Civil War and a recipient of the U.S. military's highest decoration, the Medal of Honor, for his actions during the capture of a blockade runner.

Born in about 1839 in Boston, O'Brien was still living in that city when he joined the Navy. He served during the Civil War as a coxswain on the USS John Adams. On November 28, 1864, he was involved in the capture of the blockade runner Beatrice off Sullivan's Island in Charleston Harbor. O'Brien commanded one of the launches which approached and boarded the ship despite heavy fire from the Confederate Fort Moultrie. Beatrice's equipment was then confiscated and the ship set afire. For these actions, O'Brien was awarded the Medal of Honor a month later on December 31, 1864.

O'Brien's official Medal of Honor citation reads:

Served as coxswain on board the U.S. Sloop John Adams, Sullivan's Island Channel, 28 November 1864. Taking part in the boarding of the blockade runner Beatrice while under heavy enemy fire from Fort Moultrie, O'Brien, who was in charge of one of the boarding launches, carried out his duties with prompt and energetic conduct. This action resulted in the firing of the Beatrice and the capture of a quantity of supplies from her.

O'Brien was promoted to acting master's mate before leaving the Navy. He died on October 1, 1894, at age 54 or 55 and was buried in Oak Hill Cemetery in Gloucester, Massachusetts.
