= George C. Read =

United States Naval Officer (1788-1862)

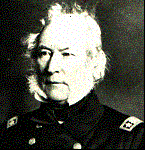
- Photograph of George C. Read taken shortly before his death in 1862.
- Born: January 9, 1788; Glastonbury, Connecticut, U.S.
- Died: August 22, 1862 (aged 74); Philadelphia, Pennsylvania, U.S.
- Burial place: Laurel Hill Cemetery, Philadelphia, Pennsylvania
- Spouse: Elizabeth Dale
- Military career
- Allegiance: United States (Union)
- Branch: United States Navy
- Service years: 1804–1862
- Rank: Rear admiral
- Commands: USS Scorpion; USS Vixen; USS Conquest; USS Hornet; USS Chippewa; USS Constitution; USS Constellation; East India Squadron; USS Columbia; Philadelphia Naval Asylum; Africa Squadron; Mediterranean Squadron; Philadelphia Navy Yard; Philadelphia Naval Asylum
- Conflicts: War of 1812; USS Constitution vs HMS Guerriere; USS United States vs HMS Macedonian; Second Barbary War; Second Sumatran Expedition; American Civil War

George Campbell Read (January 9, 1788 – August 22, 1862) was a United States Navy officer. He served during the War of 1812, commanded the USS Chippewa during the Second Barbary War, commanded the East India Squadron from 1837 to 1840 including during the Second Sumatran expedition in 1838, commanded the Africa Squadron from 1846 to 1847, and the Mediterranean Squadron from 1847 to 1849. He commanded the Philadelphia Naval Asylum from 1839 to 1846, the Philadelphia Navy Yard from 1850 to 1853, and the Philadelphia Naval Asylum again during the American Civil War from 1861 to 1862. He was promoted to rear admiral in July 1862.

== Early life ==
Read was born on January 9, 1788, in Glastonbury, Connecticut. At the age of 16, Read entered service in the United States Navy as a midshipman on April 2, 1804.

== Career ==
Read first joined the crew of USS Constitution in 1806 under the command of his uncle, Captain Hugh G. Campbell. On April 25, 1810, after six years of service, Read was promoted to lieutenant, and he served aboard USS Constitution under Commodore Isaac Hull during the War of 1812. After the victory of the USS Constitution vs HMS Guerriere, Read was assigned by Hull to board the British vessel, accept her surrender, remove the prisoners, and set her ablaze.

Read was served under Commodore Stephen Decatur aboard USS United States during the naval action USS United States vs HMS Macedonian. In 1813, he served on the USS John Adams, and commanded the USS Scorpion and USS Vixen. In 1814, he commanded the USS Conquest. He received Congressional silver medals for his service on the Constitution and United States during the War of 1812. He was stationed in Boston from 1815 to 1817. He was promoted to master commandant in 1817 and commanded the USS Hornet.

As a lieutenant, Read commanded the brig USS Chippewa during the Second Barbary War in 1815. He was promoted to commander in 1816, and served in the Mediterranean and off the coast of Africa. After a promotion to captain in 1825, he took command of USS Constitution.

In April 1832, Read was given command of the USS Constellation for a two-year voyage off the coast of northern Africa. Upon return to the United States, Read was accused of cruelty by one of his crew. Read demanded to be tried by Courts-Martial as soon as possible. A trial took place in Baltimore, Maryland on June 23, 1835. Testimony revealed that the accuser, a midshipman, had refused to go aloft the mast when ordered by Read. Read responded by ordering the midshipman bound with rope and hauled to the top of the mast. Read was found guilty of "conduct unbecoming of an officer and a gentleman" and "Oppression" and he was suspended from duty for one year.

He commanded the East India Squadron from 1837 to 1840 and took part in retaliatory actions against the pirates and raiders who preyed on American shipping in India. He commanded the Second Sumatran Expedition which was undertaken in response to the massacre of the merchant ship Eclipse. In 1840, Around the World: A Narrative of a Voyage in the East India Squadron, Under Commodore George C. Read., was published by Charles S. Francis, which described the travels of the East India Squadron.

From 1839 to 1846, Read commanded the Philadelphia Naval School. He served on a Naval board with Commodores Thomas ap Catesby Jones, Matthew C. Perry, and Captains Elie A. F. La Vallette and Isaac Mayo for the examination of midshipmen entitled to promotion. He next commanded the Africa Squadron from 1846 to 1847 and the Mediterranean Squadron from 1847 to 1849. He commanded the Philadelphia Navy Yard from 1850 to 1853. When the American Civil War broke out in 1861, Read was again in charge of the Philadelphia Naval Asylum. Read was promoted to rear admiral on the retired list in July 1862.

== Personal life ==
Read married Elizabeth Dale (1807-1863), the daughter of Commodore Richard Dale, in July 1829. He died on August 22, 1862, and was interred in Laurel Hill Cemetery in Philadelphia, Pennsylvania.

== Legacy ==
The naval patrol ship USS Commodore Read was named in his honor.

Military offices
Preceded by Edmund P. Kennedy	Commander, East India Squadron; 14 December 1837–13 June 1840	Succeeded by Lawrence Kearny
