= USS Plymouth (1844) =

Gunboat of the United States Navy

History

United States
- Name: USS Plymouth
- Namesake: Plymouth, Massachusetts
- Builder: Boston Navy Yard
- Laid down: 16 June 1843
- Launched: 11 October 1843
- In service: circa 3 April 1844
- Out of service: 20 April 1861
- Fate: Scuttled to prevent capture, 20 April 1861
- Name: CSS Plymouth
- In service: 23 June 1861
- Homeport: Gosport Navy Yard
- Fate: Scuttled to prevent capture, 10 May 1862; Raised and subsequently sold, 8 February 1864

General characteristics
- Type: Sloop of War
- Displacement: 989 tons
- Length: 147 ft 6 in (44.96 m) (lbp)
- Beam: 38 ft 1 in (11.61 m)
- Depth of hold: 17 ft 2 in (5.23 m)
- Propulsion: Sail
- Sail plan: Ship-Rigged
- Speed: not known
- Boats & landing craft carried: 1x Launch, 2x Cutters, 2x Quarterboats, 1x Stern boat
- Complement: 210
- Armament: four 8" shell guns (63 CWT/7,056 lbs); eighteen 32-pounder guns (42 CWT/4,704 lbs)

USS Plymouth was a sloop-of-war constructed and commissioned just prior to the Mexican–American War. She was heavily gunned, and traveled to Japan as part of Commodore Matthew C. Perry's effort to force Japan to open her ports to international trade. She also served in European and Caribbean waters and, later in her career, she was used to train midshipmen.

Plymouth was the first ship of the United States Navy to be named for Plymouth, Massachusetts, a town on Plymouth Bay, about 35 mi (56 km) southeast of Boston, Massachusetts. Plymouth was founded by the Pilgrims in 1620.

== Built in Boston ==
Built by the Boston Navy Yard, she departed Boston, Massachusetts, on 3 April 1844 for the Mediterranean Sea, Commander Henry Henry in command.

After over a year in European waters, she sailed westward and arrived at New York City on 4 October 1846.

== Far East ==
Following service on the U.S. East Coast, Plymouth departed New York City, 13 February 1848, for the Far East, returning to Norfolk, Virginia, from the East Indies on 29 January 1851. On 23 August 1851 she stood out from Hampton Roads, Virginia, bound once again for the Orient.

After duty on the East India Squadron, she joined Commodore Matthew C. Perry's expedition to Japan, entering Edo Bay on 8 July 1853 and departing on 17 July. She returned in February of the following year and before heading home put into Shanghai where she sent a party ashore to support a coordinated British-American expedition against hostile forts in the area.

== Training Navy midshipmen ==
Returning to Norfolk, Virginia, 11 January 1855, Plymouth began an extended tour in the Atlantic Ocean. Assigned as a midshipmen training ship during the summers of 1855 and 1856, she tested new ordnance under the command of Commander John A. Dahlgren in 1858 and resumed duties as a training ship for midshipmen during the summers of 1859 and 1860.

== American Civil War ==
Plymouth was at Norfolk, Virginia, for repairs during the secession crises in the winter of 1860–1861. After Virginia seceded from the Union, she was scuttled and partially burned there, 20 April 1861, to prevent her capture by the forces of the Confederate States of America when the Gosport Navy Yard fell into their hands.

The Confederates raised her by 23 June 1861, despite her being 30 feet (9.1 meters) deep in mud and water, and planned to sail her up the James River to Richmond. However, when the Navy Yard was recaptured by the Union on 10 May 1862, she had not been moved and the Confederates scuttled her to avoid capture. She was again raised and her hulk sold at auction on 8 February 1864.

== See also ==
- Union Navy
