= Battle of the Barrier Forts =

1856 battle of the Second Opium War

Coordinates: 23°6′37″N 113°19′15.5″E

- Part of the Second Opium War
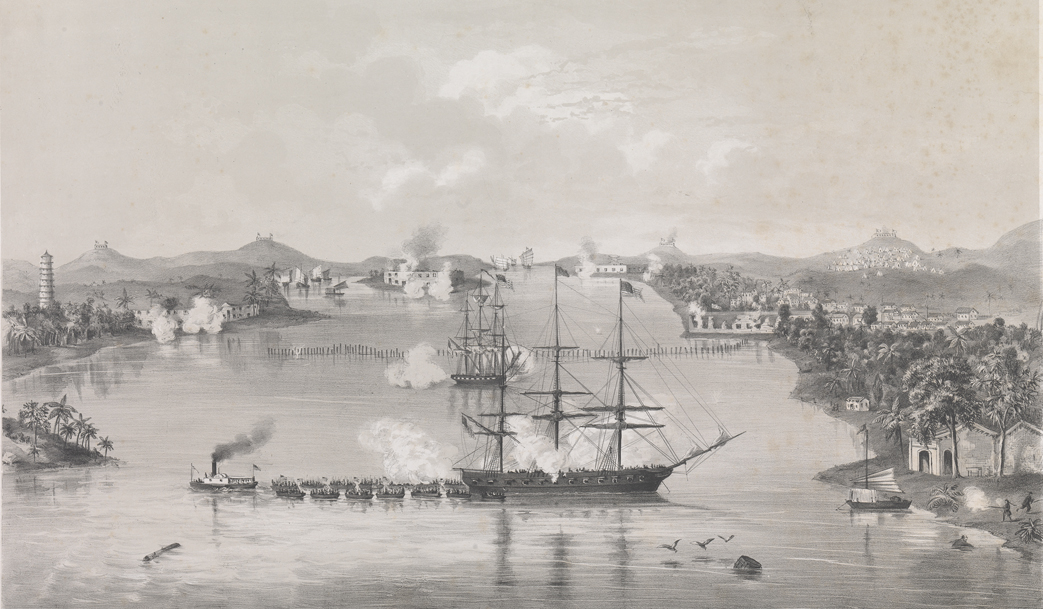
- Attack on the Barrier Forts on November 21, showing Portsmouth, and Levant, with men and officers from the steam frigate San Jacinto
Date	16–22 November 1856
Location	Pearl River, Guangzhou, China
Result	American victory

Belligerents
United States	Qing China

Commanders and leaders
Andrew Hull Foote; James Armstrong	Ye Mingchen

Units involved
U.S. Navy U.S. Marine Corps	Eight Banners Green Standard Army

Strength
50 marines 237 sailors (on land); 1 steam frigate (unengaged); 2 sloops	5,000 (garrison force); 3,000 (non-garrison force)

Casualties and losses
10 killed 22 wounded 2 sloops damaged	250–500 killed or wounded 176 guns lost 4 forts captured

The Battle of the Barrier Forts (also known as the Battle of the Pearl River Forts) was fought between American and Chinese forces in the Pearl River, Guangdong, China in November 1856 during the Second Opium War. The United States Navy launched an amphibious assault against a series of four forts known as the Barrier Forts near the city of Canton (modern-day Guangzhou). It was considered an important battle by the British whose interest lay in capturing Canton.

== Background ==
Sailing off the Chinese coast, USS Portsmouth and USS Levant had received news of the beginning of the Second Opium War. The two sloops-of-war were tasked with protecting American lives by landing a 150-man detachment of marines and sailors in Canton.

After a peaceful landing the Americans took position in the American compound. Commanded by Commodore James Armstrong and Captain Henry H. Bell as his flag captain, USS San Jacinto arrived in Canton's harbor and learned of the situation. San Jacinto then landed a shore party of her own.

On November 15, 1856, after a brief stay, the force withdrew from the city. During the withdrawal, Commander Andrew H. Foote of the Portsmouth rowed out to his ship. As he rowed past the Pearl River Forts, the Chinese garrison fired on the small American boat a few times but the withdrawal continued.

The next day the U.S. seamen had constructed a plan to attack Canton's citadels in retaliation for the Chinese attack on Commander Foote.

== Battle ==
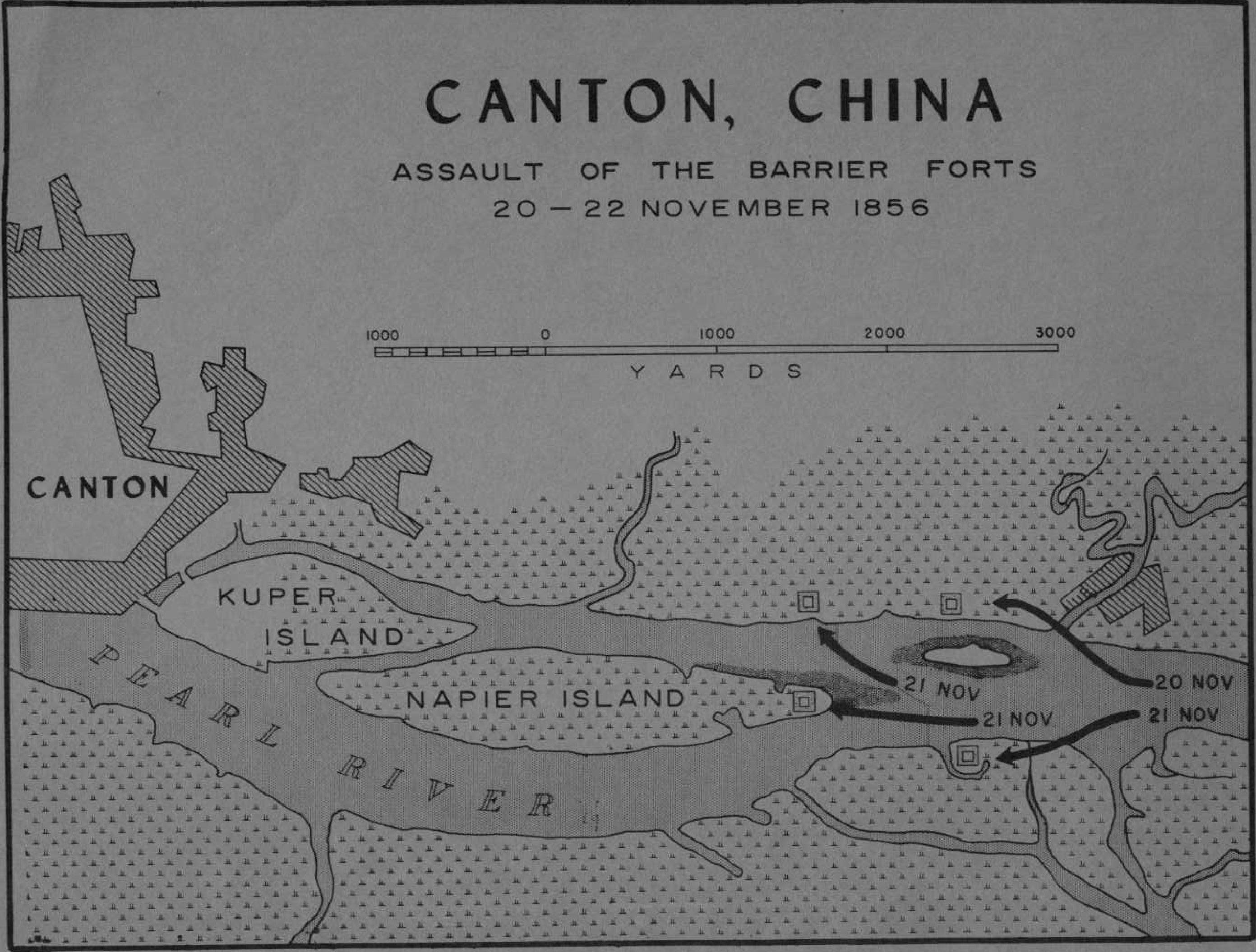
Map of the assault on the Barrier Forts, 20–22 November

Leaving the San Jacinto whose draft prevented it to sail upstream, the naval squadron under James Armstrong made its way up the Pearl River and launched an attack on Canton's coastal forts. USS Levant having been grounded, USS Portsmouth closed in alone on the citadels and fired the initial salvo on November 16.

After this first engagement, Chinese and American officials decided to try to settle the matter diplomatically. This failed and on November 20, Commodore Armstrong ordered his ships to attack the two nearest Chinese forts.

This bombardment lasted until the Chinese batteries weakened slightly, after which the Levant, commanded by William N. Smith, received 22 cannonball shots in her sails, rigging, and hull. Under cover of their ships' fire, a storming party of 287 troops led by Foote landed unopposed. Spearheading this force were about 50 marines under Captain John D. Simms and a small detachment of sailors. They quickly captured the first enemy fort, then repulsed several Chinese counter attacks some 3,000 Qing Army soldiers from Canton strong. In a few more days of intense combat until the 22 November the U.S. force, with help from the blockade, pushed back the attacking Chinese army, killing and wounding dozens of the attackers, capturing three more forts and spiking 176 enemy guns.

Chinese casualties were an estimated 250 to 500 killed or wounded. The Americans land forces sustained seven killed and 22 wounded. USS Levant suffered one killed and six wounded in her exchange with the Pearl River Forts. Portsmouth was hit 18 times and the Levant 22 times, but neither was seriously damaged.

== Aftermath ==
After James Armstrong's attack on the Chinese fortifications, diplomatic efforts began again and the American and Chinese governments signed an agreement for U.S. neutrality in the Second Opium War. This ended the United States' participation in the conflict until 1859, when Commodore Josiah Tattnall III in the chartered steamship Towey Wan participated in the Battle of Taku Forts, which was ultimately unsuccessful. In 1857, the British and French would use Pearl River to attack Canton from water, resulting in the Battle of Canton. America's opening of Asia continued into the 1860s with conflict, such as the Battle of Shimonoseki Straits and a following bombardment, as well as an expedition to Korea in the 1870s.
