= Henry H. Bell =

Henry Haywood Bell
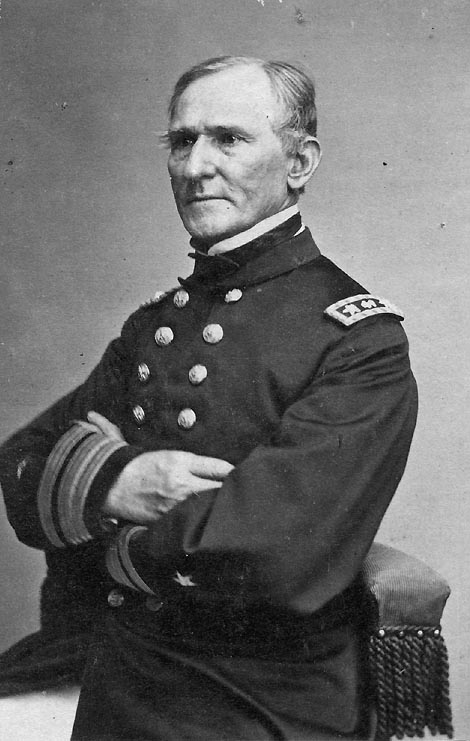
- Born: April 13, 1808; Orange County, North Carolina, U.S.
- Died: January 11, 1868 (aged 59); Osaka Bay, Japan
- Military career
- Allegiance: United States of America
- Branch: United States Navy
- Service years: 1823–1868
- Rank: Rear admiral
- Commands: Boxer; USS San Jacinto; East India Squadron
- Conflicts: Second Opium War: Battle of the Barrier Forts; American Civil War: Battle of Forts Jackson and St. Philip; Formosa Expedition

Henry Haywood Bell (13 April 1808 – 11 January 1868) was an American admiral in the United States Navy. In the American Civil War, he took part in the liberation of New Orleans and the lower Mississippi. Later he was sent to the Far East to command the East India Squadron. In summer 1867, he led a punitive expedition to avenge the Rover incident.

== Biography ==
Bell was born in Orange County, North Carolina. Appointed a midshipman on 4 August 1823, during the next two decades he served afloat in U.S. Atlantic waters, the Mediterranean Sea and the West Indies as an officer of the frigates Constitution and United States; the sloops of war Erie, Vincennes, and Marion; and the schooner Grampus. In March 1831, while in Vincennes, Bell was promoted to the rank of Lieutenant. He was assigned to special service on a vessel named Hunter (apparently not part of the U.S. Navy) during the mid-1840s, then was off Africa and in the Mediterranean as an officer of the frigate United States and as commanding officer of the schooner Boxer. Between early 1849 and mid-1855, Bell served ashore at the Philadelphia, Norfolk and New York Navy Yards.

Promoted to the rank of commander in August 1854, Bell went to the East Indies in 1855–1858 as commanding officer of the steamer San Jacinto. He spent the late 1850s and early 1860s as a member of the Board of Examiners at the U.S. Naval Academy and on ordnance duty at both Cold Spring, New York and the Washington Navy Yard.

During the Civil War he served as fleet captain of the West Gulf Blockading Squadron under Admiral David Farragut. He served in the series of campaigns that captured New Orleans and gradually opened the Mississippi River for exploitation by Federal forces. In July 1862, while so-engaged, he attained the rank of commodore. After completing his Gulf assignment in 1864, he was assigned to the New York Navy Yard as inspector of ordnance.

With the Civil War at an end, in July 1865 Commodore Bell was sent to the Far East to command the East India (later Asiatic) Squadron. He was advanced to rear admiral a year later and placed on the retired list in April 1867, but remained active as the Asiatic Squadron's commander.

== Death ==
In summer 1867, Rear Admiral Bell led the Formosan Expedition, a punitive operation in response to the Rover incident, where American sailors had been killed by Taiwanese aborigines. His squadron including screw sloops of war, USS Hartford (flagship), USS Shenandoah, and USS Oneida, with warships of other western countries, anchored in Osaka Bay to increase pressure on the Japanese government to open Hyōgo Port on 1 January 1868 as committed by various unequal treaties. On 11 January 1868, having passed Tempōzan en route upriver, his boat overturned in heavy seas; Bell and all but three of the craft's other occupants perished in this accident.

== Namesakes ==
Two ships, USS Bell, have been named for him.

== See also ==
Military offices
Preceded by Cicero Price	Commander, East India Squadron; 11 August 1865–11 January 1868	Succeeded by none
