= USS John Adams (1799) =

United States Navy frigate (1799–1865)

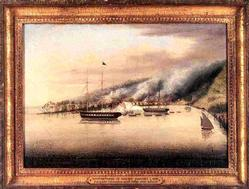
- Columbia and John Adams bombarding Muckie, Sumatra, 1 January 1839

History

United States
- Ordered: Fall of 1798
- Cost: $113,505
- Launched: 5 June 1799 at Charleston, South Carolina
- Commissioned: circa 1 October 1799
- Decommissioned: September 1865
- Stricken: 1865 (est.)
- Fate: Sold, 5 October 1867

General characteristics
- Tons burthen: 544 (bm)
- Length: 139 ft (42.4 m) (between perpendiculars) Keel:104 feet, 109 inches
- Beam: 32 ft (9.8 m)
- Depth of hold: 16 ft 4 in (5.0 m)
- Propulsion: sail
- Complement: 220 officers and enlisted men
- Armament: 24 × 12-pounder guns; 6 × 24-pounder guns

The first John Adams was originally built in 1799 as a frigate for the United States Navy, used as a stores ship/provisioning ship ordered to provide that service in May, 1804, converted to a corvette in 1809, and later converted back to a frigate in 1830. Named for American Founding Father and president John Adams, she fought in the Quasi-War, the First and Second Barbary Wars, the War of 1812, the Second Sumatran Expedition, the Mexican–American War and the American Civil War. At the end of her career, she participated in the Union blockade of South Carolina's ports.

== Origin ==
John Adams was built for the United States by the people of Charleston, South Carolina, under contract to Paul Pritchard and launched in the latter's shipyard some 3 miles (4.8 km) from Charleston 5 June 1799.

== Quasi-War ==
Captain George Cross sailed John Adams on 20 October for Cayenne, French Guiana, to operate against French privateers based at that port. By the time she arrived off South America, the British had captured Surinam, which made the French base in Guiana unsafe for privateers. Captain Cross therefore decided to sail her on to Guadeloupe to join her squadron.

Early in January 1800, she began operations against the French, taking an unidentified lugger off San Juan, Puerto Rico and recapturing brig Dolphin. She then retook the brigs Hannibal on 22 March and Atlantic the next day, both prizes of the French privateer President Tout. The French privateer schooner Jason surrendered to her 3 April. In May she retook schooners Dispatch and William. Sometime in the late spring or summer she recaptured the American brig Olive, and on 13 June she took French privateer schooner La Decade. On 7 September she recaptured ship "Seahorse". These victories punctuated and highlighted the day-to-day duty of patrolling the West Indies. She continued to protect American shipping through the late summer and fall.

John Adams left on 22 November escorting a convoy to the United States. She was placed in ordinary in Charleston in mid-January 1801, and then in late June she sailed to Washington, D.C. where she was laid up.

As the Quasi-War with France drew to a close, President Adams could report to Congress:

The present Navy of the United States, called suddenly into existence by a great national emergency, has raised us in our own esteem; and by the protection afforded to our commerce has effected to the extent of our expectations the objects for which it was created.

== First Barbary War ==
Peace with France freed the Navy for operations against Barbary corsairs who had been preying on American shipping in the Mediterranean. A small squadron under Commodore Richard Dale, sent out in 1801 for operations against Tripoli, was followed in 1802 by a much stronger force under Commodore Richard Valentine Morris. In a letter dated 25 August 1802 Captain John Rodgers was ordered to take command. On 22 October she sailed from Hampton Roads to join Commodore Morris. She arrived at Gibraltar on 10 December. After escorting vessels from Gibraltar to Málaga and Menorca, she finally caught up with Commodore Morris at Malta on 5 January 1803. She then operated with the squadron until 3 May when she received orders to cruise independently off Tripoli. Upon arriving off Tripoli, 8–9 May 1803, she, still under the command of Rodgers, boldly attacked the forts and the gunboats anchored under their protection. There was an exchange of fire with the gunboats the next day also. On 12 May she captured 28-gun former Tripolitan cruiser Meshuda, that had been transferred to Moroccan ownership while being blockaded at Gibraltar, while trying to run the blockade into Tripoli. After USS New York and USS Enterprise joined her, John Adams engaged a flotilla of enemy gunboats off Tripoli on 22 May sending them scurrying back into the harbor to safety. Five days later—with the added support of USS Adams, a sister frigate also named for President John Adams—the squadron again exchanged fire with group of Tripolitan forts and gunboats.

One of the most important victories of the war came on 21 June when John Adams and Enterprise captured a 22-gun vessel belonging to Tripoli, thus weakening that state sufficiently to allow the squadron to turn its attention to Tunis, Algiers, and Morocco, which were threatening U.S. commerce in the Western Mediterranean. Throughout the summer and early fall John Adams operated in that quarter before returning home with New York. On 6 October 1803 Capt. High Campbell took command. At the end of the brief war between the U. S. And Morocco, that had been started by the Governor of Tangier without permission of the Emperor of Morocco, Meshuda was returned to the Emperor of Morocco on 19 October 1803. On 19 October she sailed for home. She arrived at the Washington Navy Yard on 11 December 1803.

In March, 1804 she was fitting out for deployment to the Mediterranean and Lt. Isaac Chauncey was ordered to take command on 8 March the day she was recommissioned. By 24 May 1804 Chauncey had been promoted to Master Commandant. In a letter dated 29 May to Commodore Preble the Secretary of the Navy states that "John Adams' is a stores/provisioning ship and should be constantly used as such unless an operation was about to happen that she could be useful for, but be detained as little as necessary. She departed the Washington Navy Yard on 23 May. She arrived at Hampton Roads on 15 June, departing 25 June. She arrived at Gibraltar on 22 July 1804. Meanwhile, Commodore Edward Preble, who had led a powerful fleet to the Mediterranean, vigorously pressed the fight. In August and September 1804 he made a series of major attacks on Tripoli. As the second of these blows was being delivered 7 August, John Adams, now under Captain Isaac Chauncey, arrived on the scene deeply laden with stores. Her boats participated in a reconnaissance patrol on the night of 18 August, and 6 days later she slipped in close to the city for an intensive 4-hour bombardment. Two nights later during a similar attack, an enemy shot sank one of John Adams's boats, killing three men and wounding a fourth, as the American Squadron severely punished Tripoli with over 700 well-directed rounds which took effect within the city. After a fifth attack had been successfully completed 3 September, bad weather interrupted operations and John Adams sailed to Syracuse with other ships of the squadron.

On 8 January 1805 she sailed for the U.S. with Commodore Preble, arriving at New York 26 February 1805. On 6 March 1805 Secretary of the Navy Robert Smith ordered Captain Isaac Chauncey to make all necessary repairs to quickly prepare her for another Mediterranean voyage and recruitment of seamen for the frigate's third voyage to the Mediterranean, he emphasized, the Navy wanted,"active men who can fight."

It is my wish to send to the Mediterranean as many men in the John Adams as she can conveniently carry thither. I want to send out 500 Men, of which number at least 200 must be Able Seamen. You will begin to recruit as soon as you conveniently can. Enter the men to serve 2 years (although it is probable they will not be kept in the Mediterranean for 2 years) allow Able Seamen $ 12 per month, Ordinary Seamen $ 8, Boys $ 6. Engage healthy, active men who can fight. Allow 2 to 4 months advance on customary security.

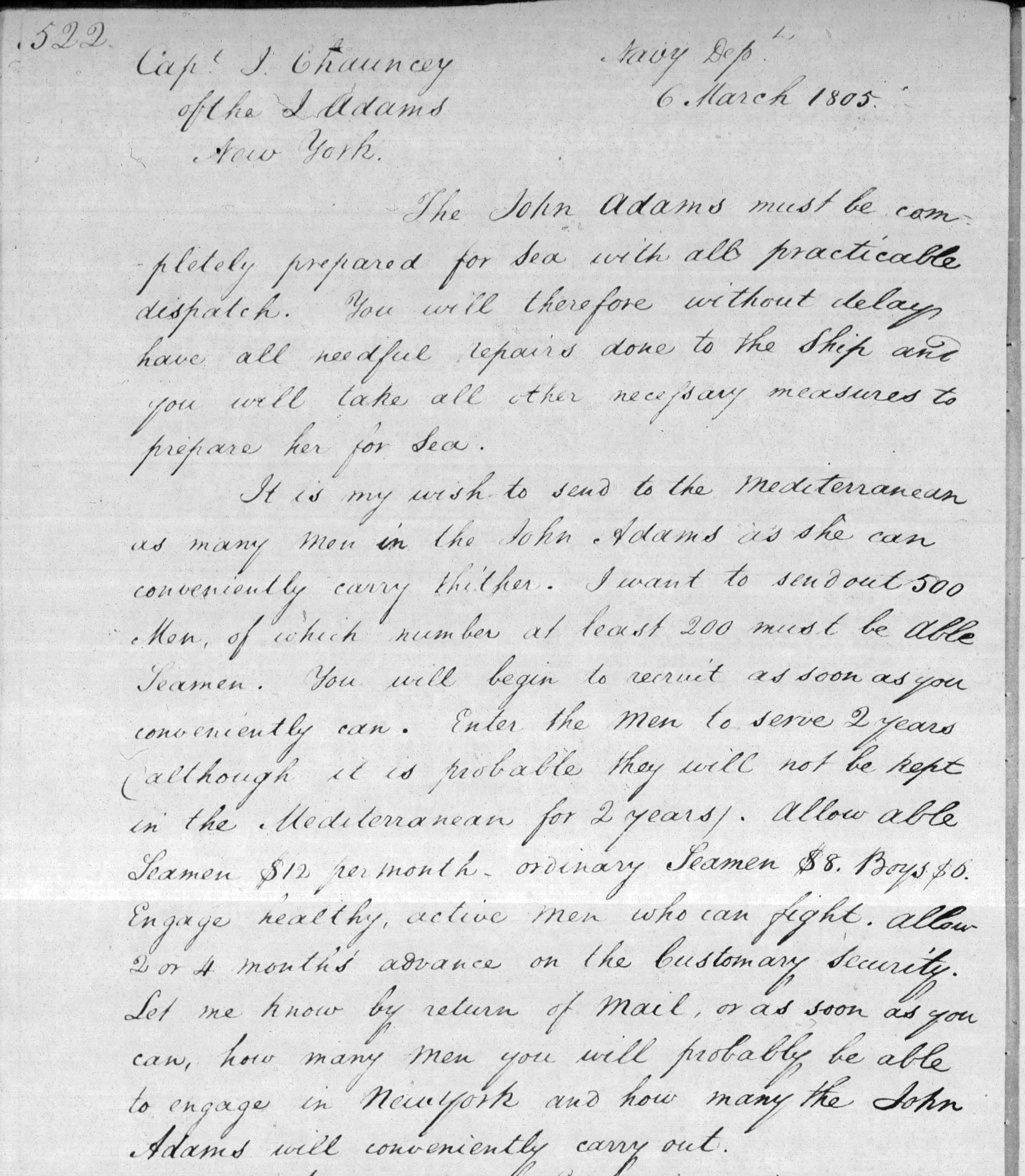
R Smith to Captain Isaac Chauncey, 6 Mar 1805, re recruiting seamen for USS John Adams

On 17 March 1805 the Secretary of the Navy gave Chauncey permission to take a requested furlough. Master Commandant John Shaw assumed command at Noon 16 April 1805.

On her next Mediterranean supply run, May to November, she transported approximately 500 sailors as replacements for crews whose enlistments had expired or were about to. She escorted a number of gunboats, but they were separated in a storm. She arrived at Gibraltar 15 June 1805. On 30 July she was with the U.S. fleet at Tunis. In service she had been considered a poor sailor; between 1807 and 1809 her forecastle and quarterdeck were removed and she was re-rated as (depending on the source) either a corvette or a sloop-of-war.

== War of 1812 ==
The outbreak of the War of 1812 found her undergoing repairs at Boston whence she was hurried to New York to have the work completed. There the British blockade and a critical shortage of seamen kept her in a laid-up status until early 1814. She finally sailed under a flag of truce carrying peace commissioners Henry Clay and Jonathan Russell to Europe and arrived Wargo Island, Norway, 14 April. She returned to the United States 5 September bringing dispatches from the American commissioners the Treaty of Ghent that would end the war towards the end of the year.

== Second Barbary War ==
Meanwhile, the Barbary pirates, taking advantage of the American Navy's preoccupation with the British fleet during the War of 1812, had resumed operations against American merchantmen in the Mediterranean. Fortunately the treaty of peace signed on Christmas Eve 1814 freed United States men-of-war for renewed attention to this chronic trouble spot. In the autumn of 1815 John Adams arrived in the Mediterranean to assist frigates USS United States and USS Constellation and sloops USS Erie and USS Ontario in maintaining peace and order in the area after strong squadrons under Commodores Stephen Decatur and William Bainbridge had induced the Barbary princes to honor their treaty commitments. Early in 1816 she returned home with dispatches, and with marble from Naples for refurbishing the Capitol at Washington.

== West Indies ==
Pirates were also active in the West Indies at this time. Taking advantage of the chaos attendant upon the dissolution of Spain's American empire, lawless vessels from many nations preyed on neutral as well as Spanish commerce in the Caribbean, the Gulf of Mexico, and along the storied Spanish Main. For the next few years John Adams was busy fighting buccaneers. On 22 December 1817 she demanded and received the surrender of Amelia Island, off the east coast of Florida, the base from which corsairs of Commodore Louis-Michel Aury pounced upon merchantmen of all nations.

== Venezuela ==
In the spring of 1819 Secretary of the Navy Smith Thompson selected Commodore Oliver Hazard Perry for the mission of establishing friendly relations with the government of newly independent Republic of Venezuela and Provinces United of Rio de La Plata and negotiating with the president Simon Bolivar to obtain restitution for United States schooners Tiger and Liberty that the Venezuelans patriots had illegally taken in the Orinoco river during the revolution. Perry boarded his flagship John Adams at Annapolis and sailed in company with schooner USS Nonsuch on 7 June. A month later he reached the mouth of the Orinoco, which he ascended to Angostura in Nonsuch while John Adams sailed on to Trinidad to await his return at Port of Spain. After protracted negotiation, the Vice President of Venezuela Francisco Antonio Zea granted all the demands of the United States on 11 August. However, during the passage down the river, Perry was stricken with yellow fever and died on board the John Adams.

Commodore Charles Morris succeeded Perry in command of the squadron and John Adams accompanied his flagship Constellation on a voyage to the Plata River to continue the negotiations inaugurated by Perry to establish friendly relations with the new Latin American republics and to protect American commerce from South American privateers. After visiting Montevideo and Buenos Aires, both ships returned to the United States, arriving Hampton Roads on 24 April 1820.

== 1821–1845 ==
In spite of these successes, piracy remained rampant in the West Indies, and John Adams was part of a strong West Indies Squadron created in 1821 to cope with the problem. James Biddle's ships labored with zeal; but the task, entailing careful searches by small-boat expeditions of innumerable bays, lagoons, and inlets, seemed endless. Yellow fever took a much heavier toll than the enemy necessitating reinforcements which arrived 3 March 1823 when Commodore David Porter's "Mosquito Fleet" anchored off Saint Thomas. Porter, the squadron's new commander, selected John Adams as his flagship. When Porter was recalled, his successor, Commodore Lewis Warrington retained John Adams as his flagship until 1826. From time to time, thereafter, the frigate returned to the West Indies for operations against pirates until 1829 when she was laid up and almost entirely rebuilt at the Navy Yard in Gosport, Virginia.

John Adams joined the Mediterranean Squadron in 1831 as a frigate. One of her first duties was to take her former commander, ex-Commodore Porter, to Constantinople where he became the U.S.'s first chargé d'affaires. The ship was granted the rare privilege of passing through the Dardanelles with guns mounted. Thereafter, she convoyed ships in the Mediterranean and in 1833 visited Liberia.

After extensive repairs in the United States, John Adams sailed from Hampton Roads on 5 May 1838, accompanied by USS Columbia, on a cruise around the world. Particular stress was placed upon showing the flag in the East Indies where the United States enjoyed a prosperous and growing trade. Both ships arrived Rio de Janeiro 10 July but departed separately, John Adams sailing on 25 July. She stopped at Zanzibar en route to Bombay, where she rejoined Columbia before sailing on to Goa and Colombo, Ceylon.

At Colombo the ships learned that natives at Susoh (currently in Southwest Aceh Regency, Aceh, Indonesia) had attacked the American ship Eclipse. The squadron immediately sailed to the scene of the incident and bombarded the forts at Kuala Batee to induce the Rajahs of Sumatra to agree to offer assistance and protection to American vessels. They then landed over 300 marines and sailors to attack the village of Muckie, which they destroyed (Second Sumatran Expedition). Before returning to Rio de Janeiro on 23 April 1840, the squadron called at Singapore, Macau, Honolulu, Valparaíso, and Cape Horn.

== Mexican-American and Civil Wars ==
John Adams finally arrived Boston about the middle of June where she was laid up until 1842. After duty on the Brazil Station, she went into ordinary where she remained until recommissioned at the beginning of the Mexican-U.S. War.

She was anchored off the bar at Santiago 8 May 1846 during the Battle of Palo Alto. She then maintained a blockading station off the east coast of Mexico for the remainder of the war. The prolonged period of time the John Adams spent on station off the Mexican coast in support of American military operations, may account for the increase in flogging as reflected in the surviving disciplinary reports for years, 1846–1847.

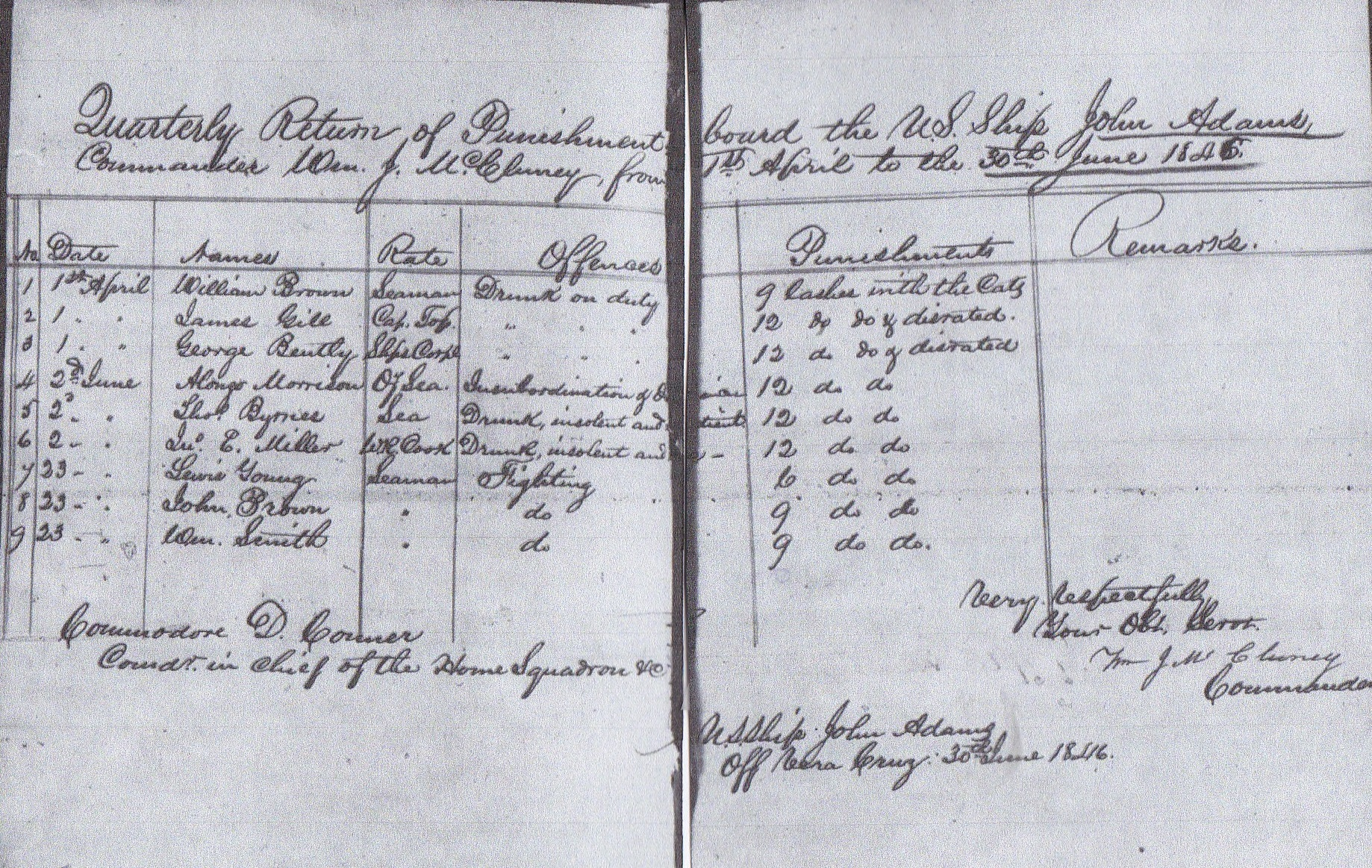
Quarterly Returns of Punishment 1 April to 30 June 1846 for USS John Adams

John Adams returned to Boston in September 1848 and received extensive repairs before joining the Royal Navy for action against the slave trade around Africa. Rear Admiral Barrington Reynolds was the British Commander-in-Chief, Cape of Good Hope Station at the time. She returned from this difficult duty in July 1853. Thereafter, with the exception of periods at home for repairs, John Adams operated in the Pacific and the Far East until after the outbreak of the Civil War. She sailed for home from Siam 6 July 1861 and reached New York 11 January 1862, bringing a box containing two letters from the King of Siam to President Lincoln, along with a sword and a pair of ivory tusks.

John Adams was sent to Newport, Rhode Island, the wartime location of the Naval Academy, to act as training ship for midshipmen. In the summer of 1863 she joined the South Atlantic Blockading Squadron and took station off Morris Island inside Charleston Bar. There she served as flagship of the inner blockade until she sailed into the harbor after the evacuation of Charleston in February 1865.

One of her crew, Coxswain Oliver O'Brien, received the Medal of Honor for his actions during the 1864 capture of a blockade runner. Another member of her crew, Acting Ensign Pierre d'Orléans, was a member of the Orleansist branch of the French royal family.

== Fate ==
Late in the summer of 1865 she sailed to Boston where she was decommissioned in September. She was one of the oldest vessels in the US Navy at the time of her decommissioning.

John Adams was sold 5 October 1867 for $1500 to the British government to use as quarters for the Hong Kong police. She was taken to Hong Kong where her hulk was commissioned in 1868 for use as Water Police Headquarters. In February 1884 the hulk John Adams caught fire and was lost. HMS Merlin later torpedoed and sank the burnt-out hulk.

== See also ==
- List of sailing frigates of the United States Navy
- Bibliography of early United States naval history
