= Florizel (disambiguation) =

Florizel (1768–1791) was a British Thoroughbred racehorse.

- Florizel (The Winter's Tale), a fictional character in Shakespeare's The Winter's Tale
- SS Florizel, a passenger liner
- HMS Florizel (J404), a military ship

== See also ==
- Florizel Street, the original name of the television series Coronation Street
- The Adventure of Prince Florizel and a Detective, a short story by Robert Louis Stevenson
- Florizel von Reuter (1890–1985), American-born violinist and composer
- Florizel Glasspole (1909–2000), the third Governor General of Jamaica
