= USS Abbot =

Two destroyers of the United States Navy have carried the name USS Abbot in honor of Commodore Joel Abbot.

- USS Abbot (DD-184), was a Wickes-class destroyer traded to the United Kingdom during World War II.
- USS Abbot (DD-629), was a Fletcher-class destroyer that served during World War II and the Korean War.
