= USS Abbot (DD-629) =

Fletcher-class destroyer

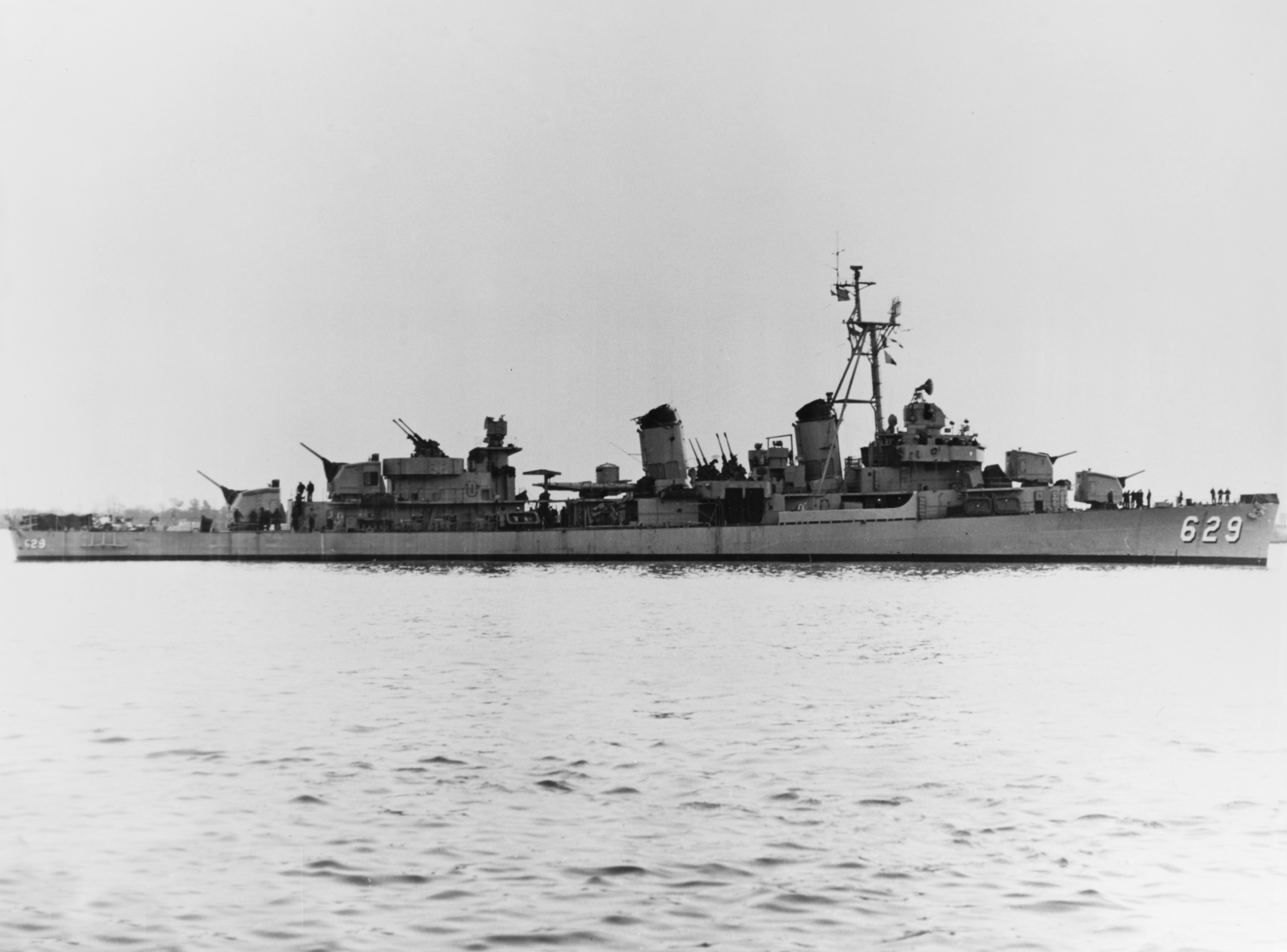

History

United States
- Name: Abbott
- Namesake: Joel Abbot
- Builder: Bath Iron Works
- Laid down: 21 September 1942
- Launched: 17 February 1943
- Commissioned: 23 April 1943
- Decommissioned: 26 March 1965
- Stricken: 1 December 1974
- Fate: Sold 31 July 1975 for scrapping

General characteristics
- Class & type: Fletcher-class destroyer
- Displacement: 2,050 tons
- Length: 376 ft 6 in (114.76 m)
- Beam: 39 ft (12 m)
- Draft: 17 ft 9 in (5.41 m)
- Propulsion: 60,000 shp (45,000 kW); geared turbines; 2 propellers
- Speed: 38 knots (70 km/h; 44 mph)
- Range: 6,500 nmi (12,000 km; 7,500 mi) at 15 kn (28 km/h; 17 mph)
- Complement: 329
- Armament: 5 × single Mk 12 5 in (127 mm)/38 guns; 5 × twin 40 mm (1.6 in) Bofors AA guns; 7 × single 20 mm (0.8 in) Oerlikon AA guns; 2 × quintuple 21 in (533 mm) torpedo tubes; 6 × single depth charge throwers; 2 × depth charge racks

USS Abbot (DD-629) was a Fletcher-class destroyer in the service of the United States Navy. She was the second Navy ship named after Commodore Joel Abbot (1793–1855).

Abbot was laid down on 21 September 1942 at Bath, Maine by the Bath Iron Works, launched on 17 February 1943, sponsored by Mrs. Grace Abbot Fletcher, the granddaughter of Commodore Abbot, and commissioned at the Boston Navy Yard on 23 April 1943.

== Service history ==
=== World War II ===
The destroyer completed outfitting at Boston by 13 May when she reported to the Commander, Destroyers, Atlantic Fleet, for shakedown training. She conducted her initial training out of Casco Bay, Maine, until 18 June and, during the next three months, served as an escort for larger warships conducting their own shakedown cruises. On 10 September, Abbot departed the New England coast bound for the western Pacific. She transited the Panama Canal on 16 September and, after a brief stop at San Diego, California, resumed her voyage west on 28 September. The warship arrived in the Hawaiian Islands early in October and began additional training. However, a collision with aircraft carrier Cowpens on 18 October forced her into the Pearl Harbor Navy Yard for a repair period lasting almost three months. Abbot finally returned to sea on 10 December and briefly resumed training.

==== 1944 ====
In mid-December, the destroyer stood out of Pearl Harbor, bound for the Ellice Islands, and arrived at Funafuti on the day after Christmas. Training and upkeep occupied her time through the early days of January 1944. Later that month, Abbot became a unit of Task Group 50.15 (TG 50.15), the so-called Neutralization Group attached to Task Force 58 (TF 58) for the occupation of the Marshall Islands. The assignment of that task group – carried out between 29 January and 17 February was to cut off bypassed Wotje and Taroa and to prevent enemy troops and war-planes there from supporting the Japanese garrisons at Majuro, Kwajalein, and Eniwetok. Abbot joined Chester, Salt Lake City, Pensacola, and five other destroyers in frequent shore bombardments of the two atolls to keep troops occupied and planes grounded. She continued to perform that duty until 12 February at which time she began patrolling between Majuro and Kwajalein.

By the middle of March, the destroyer had been reassigned to the southwestern Pacific where she carried out convoy escort duty between the southern Solomons and the New Guinea ports of Milne Bay and Cape Sudest. In mid-April, she became an element of the screen of TG 78.2, an escort carrier group built around Coral Sea, Corregidor, Manila Bay, and Natoma Bay. The destroyer helped to protect the escort carriers from possible Japanese air and submarine attacks, while they launched their planes to provide close support for troops landing at Aitape and Hollandia on the northern coast of New Guinea. TG 78.2 ended that mission on 5 May, but Abbot remained with the escort carrier group until 7 May, when she and several other ships shaped a course for the New Hebrides Islands. She reached Espiritu Santo on 12 May.

For the next four weeks, Abbot received routine maintenance and conducted training evolutions out of Espiritu Santo. Early in June, the destroyer headed back toward the Central Pacific in company with escort carriers and other destroyers. They stopped at Kwajalein in the Marshalls to make final preparations for the assault on Saipan. On 12 June, she stood out of Kwajalein lagoon in company with TG 53.7, the Carrier Support Group built around Sangamon, Suwanee, and Chenango. The task group arrived in the Mariana Islands on 16 June. While the air groups of the three carriers provided close air support for the assault troops – first, at Saipan and, later at Guam — Abbot and her sister ships in the screen again protected the carriers from enemy air and submarine forces. She and her charges remained with the invasion force throughout the decisive Battle of the Philippine Sea in which TF 58 shattered the remnants of Japanese naval air power. About a week later, on 26 June, she and Hale joined forces to splash a Mitsubishi G4M "Betty". Through the month of July, Abbot continued to shepherd the carriers while their aviators struck targets on Saipan and Guam in support of the American invasion troops.

Early in August, Abbot returned to Pearl Harbor for repairs, relaxation, and training. On the 28th, she began preparing for another amphibious operation. She concluded that training during the second week in September and departed Hawaii on the 15th headed for the western Pacific. Steaming via Eniwetok, she arrived at Manus Island in the Admiralty Islands on 3 October. She resumed training at Manus until 14 October when she got underway with the transport screen bound for the invasion of the Philippines at Leyte. She arrived off the beaches of that island on 20 October and began providing antiaircraft and antisubmarine protection for the transport area. Though the group to which she was attached came under sporadic air attack that day, only one intruder approached near enough to Abbot for her to open up with her antiaircraft battery. However, that twin-engine bomber night. Abbot assisted the troops ashore with night illumination and harassing fire on enemy lines near Dulag.

On the morning of 21 October, Abbot retired from Leyte to escort a group of transports to Hollandia. She arrived at that New Guinea port on 26 October and remained there until 2 November when she returned to sea with a group of transports bound for Morotai in the northern Molucca Islands of the Netherlands East Indies (now part of Indonesia). She arrived at Morotai three days later and remained there for five days. During her stay at Morotai, the enemy staged frequent night air raids on the Morotai airfield but left the ships in the anchorage unmolested. However, this pattern changed after she departed the island with a Leyte-bound task group. As the group approached the Philippines, Japanese land-based air began intermittent day and night attacks. On 13 November, a Nakajima B6N "Jill" launched a torpedo in the midst of Abbot's formation but failed to score a hit. Catskill repaid this impertinence by splashing the enemy plane some 1,000 yards (910 m) ahead of Abbot. After several days at anchor off Dulag – during which time she claimed to have damaged a Yokosuka D4Y "Judy" with her 5-inch battery — Abbot got underway for Hollandia on 24 November. She arrived at that New Guinea port on 29 November and remained there almost one month. On 23 December, the destroyer weighed anchor for the Philippines in company with a small cargoman and remained at Leyte through the end of the year and into 1945.

==== 1945 ====
Provisioning and upkeep complete, Abbot put to sea on 2 January 1945 with TG 77.4, the Escort Carrier Group for the invasion of Luzon at Lingayen Gulf. Within that task organization, she was assigned to the screen of Rear Admiral Felix Stump's San Fabian Carrier Group. During the voyage from Leyte to Lingayen, the formation came under increasingly intense air attacks by the kamikaze corps. On 4 January, one aircraft succeeded in crashing into Ommaney Bay and damaged that escort carrier so badly that she was abandoned and sunk by a torpedo from Burns. On 6 January, the Support Carrier Group divided into its constituent units, the Lingayen and San Fabian groups. Abbot continued to provide antisubmarine and anti-air protection to the San Fabian group while aircraft from its carriers carried out prelanding bombing and strafing missions and, after the ninth, supported the invasion troops in their struggle to wrest the island from the Japanese. That duty – as well as support for the secondary landings at San Felipe and Nsugbu — lasted until 31 January. At that time, Abbot departed Lingayen Gulf in company with the carriers and headed for Mindoro.

After a week of duty at Mangarin Bay, Mindoro, Abbot set a course for Subic Bay in the screen of the carriers. From that base, she joined the carriers in supporting the assaults on the islands in Manila Bay — Corregidor, El Fraile, Carabao, and Caballo. Abbot herself destroyed a number of mines around Corregidor and captured three Japanese who attempted the swim from Corregidor to Bataan. After the 15 February paratroop landing on Corregidor, the destroyer provided call fire and night illumination fire.

On 17 February, she returned to Subic Bay for a week of replenishment and upkeep before sailing for Palawan on the 24th. In company with cruisers Denver, Cleveland, Montpelier, and three other destroyers, Abbot steamed up to support elements of the Army's 41st Infantry Division's assault on Puerto Princesa — the main port on Palawan. No gunfire from the warships was necessary, however, and they headed back to Subic Bay later that day. Abbot remained at Subic Bay in an upkeep status until 4 March when she joined another cruiser-destroyer force for the assault on Zamboanga, Mindanao. There, she acted as fire-support ship for the minesweepers as well as for the troops ashore. On 11 March, she patrolled near Basilan Island — located to the south of Zamboanga Peninsula — and destroyed enemy barges with gunfire. The following day, Abbot's unit completed its mission at Mindanao, headed back to Luzon, and arrived back at Subic Bay on 17 March.

After a week of upkeep and logistics there, the warship resumed missions in support of the occupation of the remaining Japanese-held Philippine Islands. On 24 March, she stood out of Subic Bay with a cruiser-destroyer force on its way to help liberate Cebu in the Visayas subgroup. Two days later, she opened fire in the prelanding bombardment at beaches some four miles (6 km) west of Cebu City. The troops went ashore around 08:30 and the warships then shifted to call fire and harassing fire. From there, she proceeded to San Pedro Bay, Leyte, escorting a mixed group of LCMs and LCIs. After her arrival at San Pedro Bay, she remained there for the rest of March undergoing a tender availability. Through most of April, the destroyer was attached to the Commander, Philippine Sea Frontier, for whom she conducted a series of missions carrying mail and passengers.

On 24 April, she was returned to the operational control of the Commander, 7th Amphibious Force. She moved to Cebu harbor where she served standby duty as fire—support ship for the Americal Division. That assignment proved relatively uneventful until the first week in May. On 3 May, she took under fire a group of houses on Nailon Point near Tobagan village, Cebu, rumored to harbor a concentration of Japanese troops. From there. Abbot moved along the coast toward Cebu harbor, firing at targets of opportunity as she went. She repeated the mission three days later and then departed Cebu on 8 May. Staged through Mindoro, the destroyer participated in the landings at Macajalar Bay on the island of Mindanao. She participated in the preparatory shore bombardment early on the 10th though it later proved to have been unnecessary when the assault troops encountered absolutely no Japanese. The ship remained in the neighborhood until the 14th to be on hand should her guns be needed. On that day, she shaped a course back to San Pedro Bay and spent the next three weeks engaged in patrols and escort missions in the southern Philippines. She concluded her Philippine service with a 10-day tender availability at Leyte.

On 12 June, the warship reported for duty with the 3rd Fleet and was assigned to duty with the fast carriers in the screen of TG 38.3. Her task group departed Leyte Gulf on 1 July bound for an operating area just to the east of the Japanese home islands, and Abbot steamed out with them. While the carriers' aircraft attacked the enemy's homeland, the destroyer joined the other escorts in protecting their mobile bases from air and submarine attack. However, on two occasions, Abbot also got in her own licks. Just after noon on 14 July, TG 34.8.1, a special force – composed of battleships South Dakota, Indiana, Massachusetts, cruisers Quincy, Chicago, Abbot, and eight other destroyers – was detached from the TF 38 screen and closed the shores of northern Honshū near the city of Kamaishi. During six bombardment passes, the force fired over 2,300 shells of various calibers into the Japan Iron Works plant located there. A second and similar mission brought TG 34.8.1 back to the shores of Honshū at Hamamatsu on 29 July. Otherwise, Abbot served in the screen of TF 38.

On 8 August, the destroyer was shifted to TG 35.4 consisting of a cruiser division and a squadron of destroyers. Their assignment was to investigate surface targets reported some 63 miles (101 km) from the main formation. While she was forming up at 32 knots (59 km/h; 37 mph), her starboard propeller and a portion of her tail shaft broke off just forward of the after strut bearing. The damages forced her to rejoin the main force though she remained seaworthy, capable of 23 knots (43 km/h; 26 mph), and able to maintain station in formation. The following day, when Borie suffered a kamikaze hit, Abbot rendered assistance and escorted her to a rendezvous with hospital ship Rescue to evacuate casualties and thence to Saipan for repairs. The ships arrived at Saipan on 17 August, two days after the cessation of hostilities. There, Abbot herself entered drydock where her damage was found to be sufficiently serious to warrant her retiring, via Hawaii, to the Puget Sound Navy Yard. She arrived in Bremerton, Washington, early in September. After repairs, she reported to the Commander, San Diego Group, Pacific Reserve Fleet, for inactivation. Abbot was placed out of commission on 21 May 1946 and was berthed at San Diego.

=== 1950–1959 ===
Abbot spent almost five years in the Reserve Fleet, before the outbreak of hostilities in Korea in the summer of 1950 brought a need for more active ships in the Fleet. Though recommissioned on 26 February 1951, the destroyer spent the next three months at the Mare Island Naval Shipyard undergoing alterations and modernization. On 1 June, she put to sea, bound for her first operational assignment since returning to active service. Instead of Korea, however, the east coast of the United States proved to be her destination. Later that month, she transited the Panama Canal and arrived in her new home port, Newport, Rhode Island For the remainder of 1951, the destroyer underwent repairs at the Philadelphia Naval Shipyard followed by refresher training out of Guantánamo Bay, Cuba. She spent the first three months of 1952 preparing for her first deployment to the Mediterranean Sea with the 6th Fleet. That assignment began in April and ended with her return to Newport in October. Abbot spent the next 19 months operating out of Newport engaged in training evolutions — antisubmarine warfare (ASW) exercises, independent ship's exercises, and refresher training.

On 1 June 1954, the destroyer departed Newport in company with Destroyer Division 242 (DesDiv 242) on what proved to be a seven-month circumnavigation of the globe. Steaming via the Panama Canal, San Diego, Oahu, and Midway, she joined the 7th Fleet at Yokosuka, Japan, and operated in the South China Sea and in the Taiwan Strait until October. On 18 October, she headed back to the United States, via the Indian Ocean, the Suez Canal, the Mediterranean Sea, and the Atlantic Ocean, making numerous port calls along the way. The destroyer arrived back at Newport on 18 December 1954 and remained in the Newport area through January 1955. In February and March of that year, the warship participated in the annual "Springboard" exercise conducted near Guantánamo Bay, Cuba. She returned to Newport in March and began normal operations – independent ship's exercises and hunter/killer antisubmarine warfare exercises – out of her home port. Save for a three-week midshipman cruise to St. John's, Newfoundland, in August, she busied herself with normal operations for the remainder of the year.

Early in 1956, Abbot entered the Boston Naval Shipyard for a 19-week repair period. Leaving the yard on 19 May, the destroyer conducted refresher training in Cuban waters through most of June. In July, she was reassigned to Destroyer Squadron 10 (DesRon 10) along with her entire division, DesDiv 242, which became DesDiv 102. The warship spent the period from September to November either alongside a tender or in the Boston Naval Shipyard undergoing preparations for a deployment to the Mediterranean. That assignment began in November 1956 and lasted until February 1957. The destroyer returned to Newport on 22 February and, after an availability period, resumed normal exercises and type training. That summer, she made a two-month midshipman cruise that took her to Rio de Janeiro and to the West Indies. In the fall, Abbot participated in Operation Strikeback, a NATO exercise conducted in the northeastern Atlantic. During that mission, she made port visits to Belfast in Northern Ireland and to Chatham, England. Upon her return to the New England coast late in October, the ship resumed type training and exercises out of Newport and continued such duty for the rest of 1957.

On 15 January 1958, Abbot entered the Boston Naval Shipyard for her regular overhaul. After three months of repairs and modifications, she spent another month conducting refresher training out of Guantánamo Bay, Cuba. She then returned to Newport, where she spent June and the first week of July. On 11 July, she stood out of Newport bound for Annapolis, Maryland, where she embarked Naval Academy midshipmen for their summer cruise. Not long thereafter, President Camille Chamoun of Lebanon — whose country had been gripped by steadily intensifying civil strife — requested United States help in restoring order. Forces already in the Mediterranean were dispatched to his aid. Abbot and the rest of DesRon 10 escorted amphibious forces to Vieques Island and, after a stop at San Juan, Puerto Rico, headed across the Atlantic to bolster those units. She made brief stops at Gibraltar and Naples before joining TF 66 – the 6th Fleet fast carrier force – off the Levantine coast. Two weeks later, she anchored at Beirut, the Lebanese capital, to serve as gunfire support ship for the Marine Corps and Army troops operating ashore. By the end of summer, the crisis had subsided, and Abbot took up routine 6th Fleet duty until returning to Newport on Veterans Day 1958.

=== 1959–1965 ===
Her return to Newport brought a resumption of hunter/killer exercises in New England coastal waters. On 1 May 1959, the destroyer was transferred from DesRon 10 to Escort Squadron 14 (CortRon 14) as the squadron flagship. Her mission, however, remained antisubmarine warfare though in a more defensive rather than offensive mode. Later that month, she began an overhaul at the Boston Naval Shipyard. She completed repairs at the end of the summer and spent the month of September engaged in refresher training near Guantánamo Bay and at Culebra Island, Puerto Rico. In October, she returned north to Newport and resumed her antisubmarine warfare exercises.

That employment occupied her for the remainder of 1959 and throughout 1960. On 5 May 1961, Abbot briefly entered the race for space. Supporting the sub-orbital flight of Freedom 7, Abbot was detailed to help recover the Mercury capsule after splash-down roughly 300 miles (480 km) east of Cape Canaveral, Florida. The mission was designated MR-3, or Mercury-Redstone 3, and it was the United States's answer to the successful flight of Yuri Gagarin, the Soviet cosmonaut who became the first human in space. In September 1961, Abbot became the school ship for the Destroyer Officer's School located at Newport. Her routine of service along the east coast and in the West Indies training naval officers in their future duties on board destroyer-type warships was broken twice in 1962. In August, she was ordered to Guantánamo Bay, where she served as a base defense ship during disorders in Haiti. Then, in October, she participated in operations enforcing the quarantine of Cuba established by President John F. Kennedy after he learned that Soviet offensive missiles had been based on that island. She was released from that duty in mid-November and returned to Newport on the 24th to resume her training missions.

Abbot continued her role as a training platform for prospective destroyer officers until April 1964. On 14 April, she departed Newport for Philadelphia for her last active duty assignment. At Philadelphia, she served as a Naval Reserve training ship for almost a year and as flagship for Reserve Destroyer Squadron 30. She was decommissioned on 26 March 1965 at Philadelphia and, for the next decade, was berthed with the Philadelphia Group, Atlantic Reserve Fleet.

Struck from the Navy list on 1 December 1974, she was sold for scrapping to the Boston Metals Company of Baltimore, Maryland, in August 1975.

== Awards ==
Abbot earned eight battle stars for her World War II service.

== See also ==
See USS Abbot for other ships of the same name.
