= USS Macedonian (1836) =

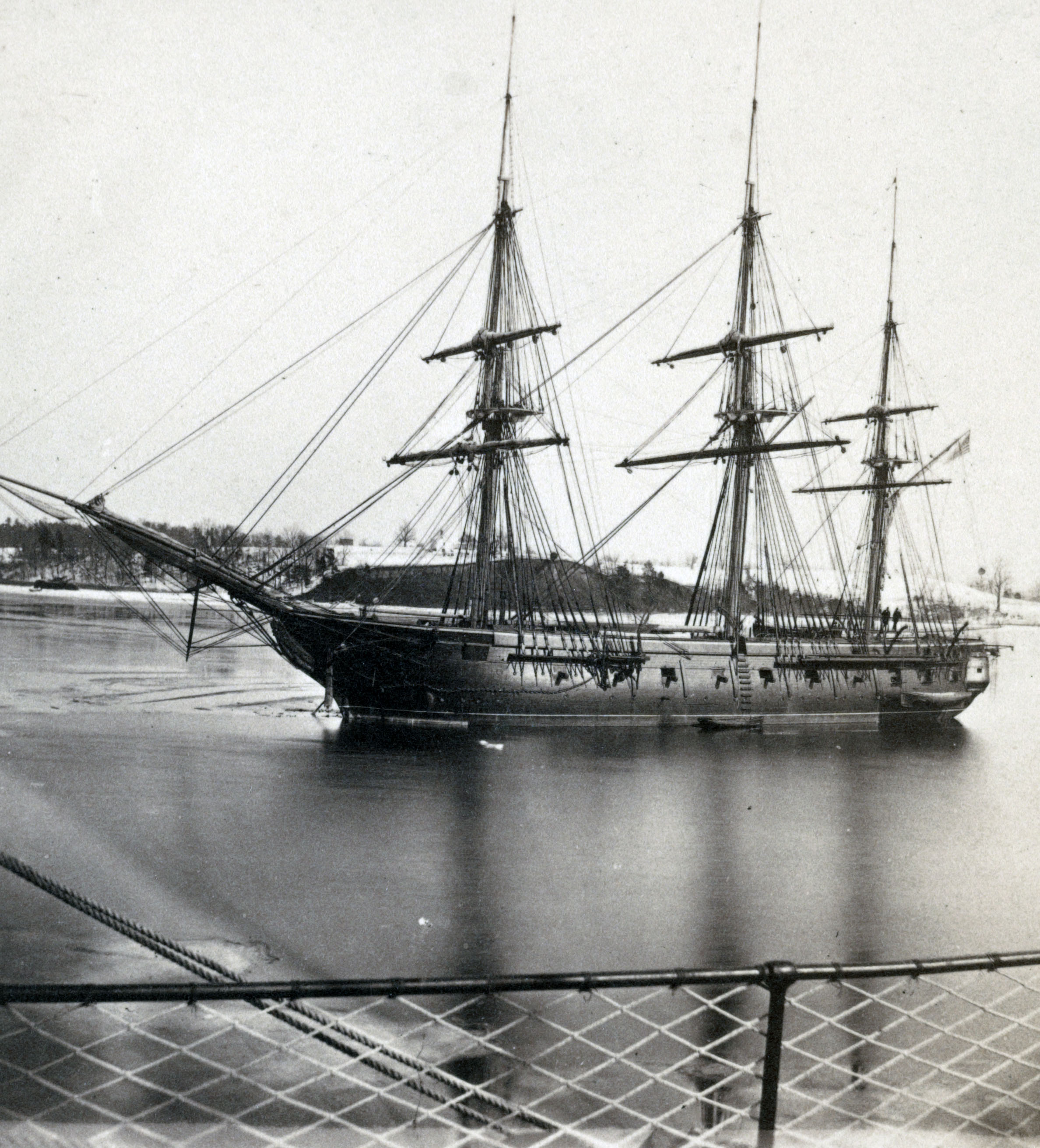
- Macedonian, port view, during the Civil War

History

United States
- Name: USS Macedonian
- Builder: Gosport Shipyard
- Launched: 1836
- Commissioned: 1836
- Refit: Razeed to a sloop-of-war, 1852
- Fate: Sold for merchant service, 1871; Converted to hotel 1900, burned 1922

General characteristics
- Type: Frigate
- Tonnage: 1341
- Length: 164 ft (50 m)
- Beam: 41 ft (12 m)
- Draft: 21 ft 6 in (6.55 m)
- Propulsion: Sails
- Complement: 489 officers and enlisted
- Armament: 36 guns

The second USS Macedonian, was a three-masted, wooden-hulled sailing frigate of the US Navy, carrying 36 guns. Rebuilt from the keel of the first Macedonian at Gosport (later Norfolk) Navy Yard, Portsmouth, Virginia beginning in 1832, the new Macedonian was launched and placed in service in 1836, with Captain Thomas ap Catesby Jones in command.

== Service history ==
=== West Indies Squadron ===
Macedonian was assigned to the West Indies Squadron to cruise in the West Indies and along the west coast of Africa from 1839 to 1847 as a continuing deterrent to Caribbean pirates.

By a joint resolution of Congress on 3 March 1847 Macedonian and sloop-of-war Jamestown were placed in civilian hands to carry food to Ireland during the Great Famine of the late 1840s. With a volunteer crew, Macedonian, Captain George C. De Kay in command, departed New York on 15 June with 12,000 barrels of provisions for Ireland donated by private citizens of the United States, returning to Brooklyn Navy Yard some months later to resume navy service.

=== Expedition to Japan ===
In 1852, Macedonian docked at the Brooklyn Navy Yard to be razeed and converted to a sloop-of-war for Commodore Matthew Perry's expedition to Japan. Assigned as part of the East India Squadron under command of Captain Joel Abbot, was one of the ten American ships entering Edo Bay, Japan, on 13 February 1854 during Perry's second visit to negotiate the opening of Japan to foreign trade, remaining as part of the show of force under the Convention of Kanagawa signed at Yokohama on 31 March 1854.

Macedonian remained on patrol in the North Pacific for the next three years. Then, from 1857 to 1861 she served with the Home Squadron in the Mediterranean and the Caribbean. On 26 October 1858 she assisted with the refloating of HMS Curacoa, which had run aground on the Pelican Shoal, off Smyrna, Ottoman Empire.

=== Civil war ===
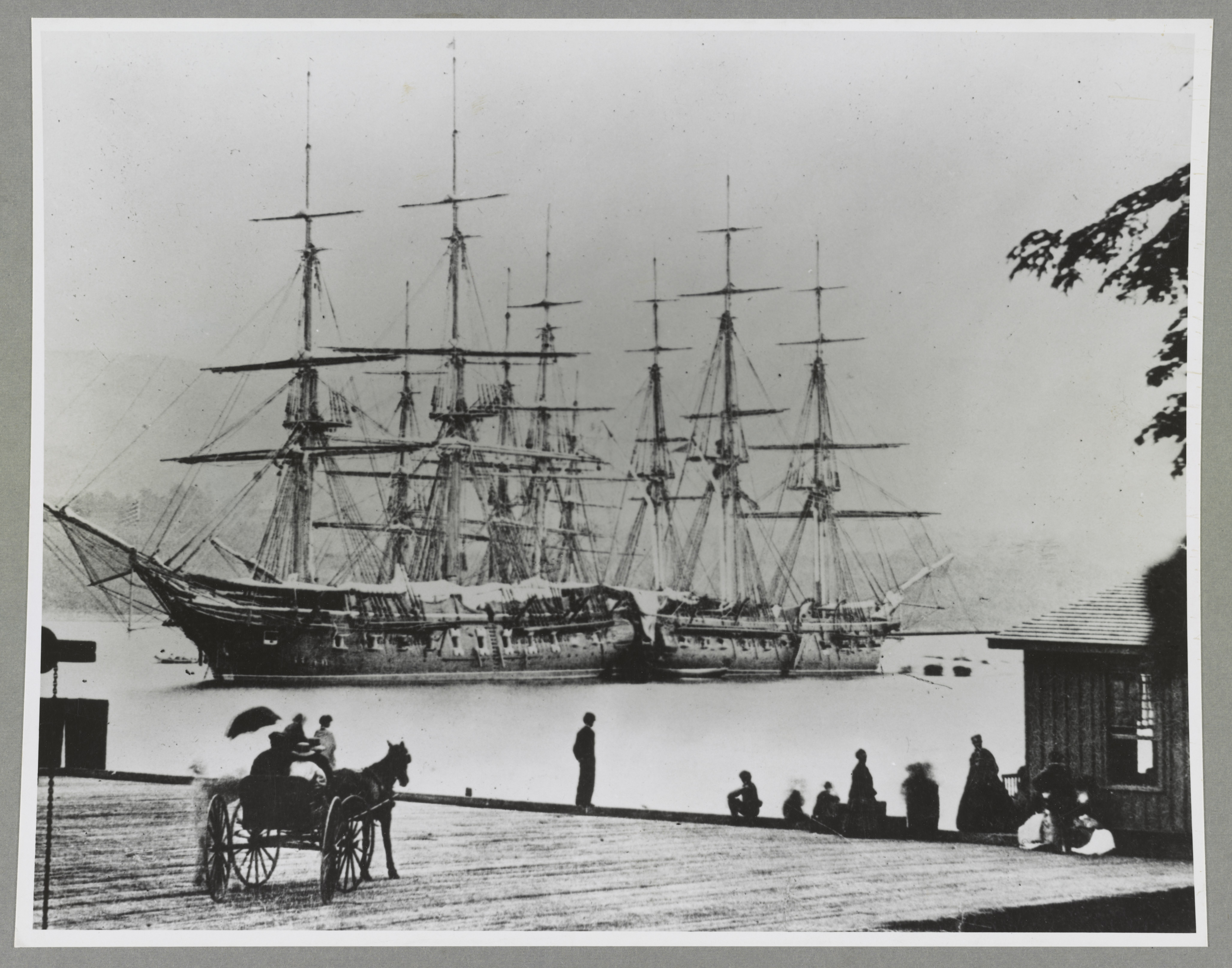
Three U.S. Navy ships, from left, the Macedonian, the Dale, and the Savannah anchored at the south wharf of West Point, on the Hudson River, New York

With the American Civil War looming just ahead, the frigate departed Portsmouth, New Hampshire, for Pensacola, Florida, on 12 January 1861 to join Brooklyn in preventing a possible Confederate attack on the harbor. On 11 February Macedonian sailed for Veracruz, Mexico, arriving on the 24th. She then began patrol operations along the gulf coast and the coast of South America, with stops at Aspinwall (later Colón, Panama) and Portobelo, Panama; Martinique; and St. Thomas, U.S. Virgin Islands. On 3 December she got underway with Dacotah from St. Thomas for the east coast, arriving Boston Navy Yard on 16 January 1862. Macedonian spent most of the next two years with the West Indies Squadron. In July 1863 she cruised along the coast of Portugal with sloop-of-war Kearsarge hunting Confederate States ship Sumter. It was around then that Alfred Thayer Mahan served aboard for a brief time.

From the end of that year through 1870, Macedonian served as school and practice ship for midshipmen at the United States Naval Academy, first at Newport, Rhode Island, then after the civil war at Annapolis, Maryland. In 1871 she was laid up in ordinary at the Norfolk Navy Yard, where she was sold to Wiggin and Robinson for merchant service.

=== Post-navy ===
There is no record of Macedonian having actually sailed as a merchant ship, and the next reference to the ship, in 1900, mentions her as having been converted into the Macedonia Hotel at City Island, Bronx. The hotel was sold in 1912 and renamed the City Island Casino, but burned down on 9 June 1922. The naval origin of the Macedonian Hotel was mentioned in a Ripley's Believe It or Not item in 1983.

== See also ==
- Glossary of nautical terms (A-L)
- Glossary of nautical terms (M-Z)
- List of sailing frigates of the United States Navy
