= Perry Expedition =

1853–54 US expedition to Tokugawa Japan

- Part of Manifest Destiny
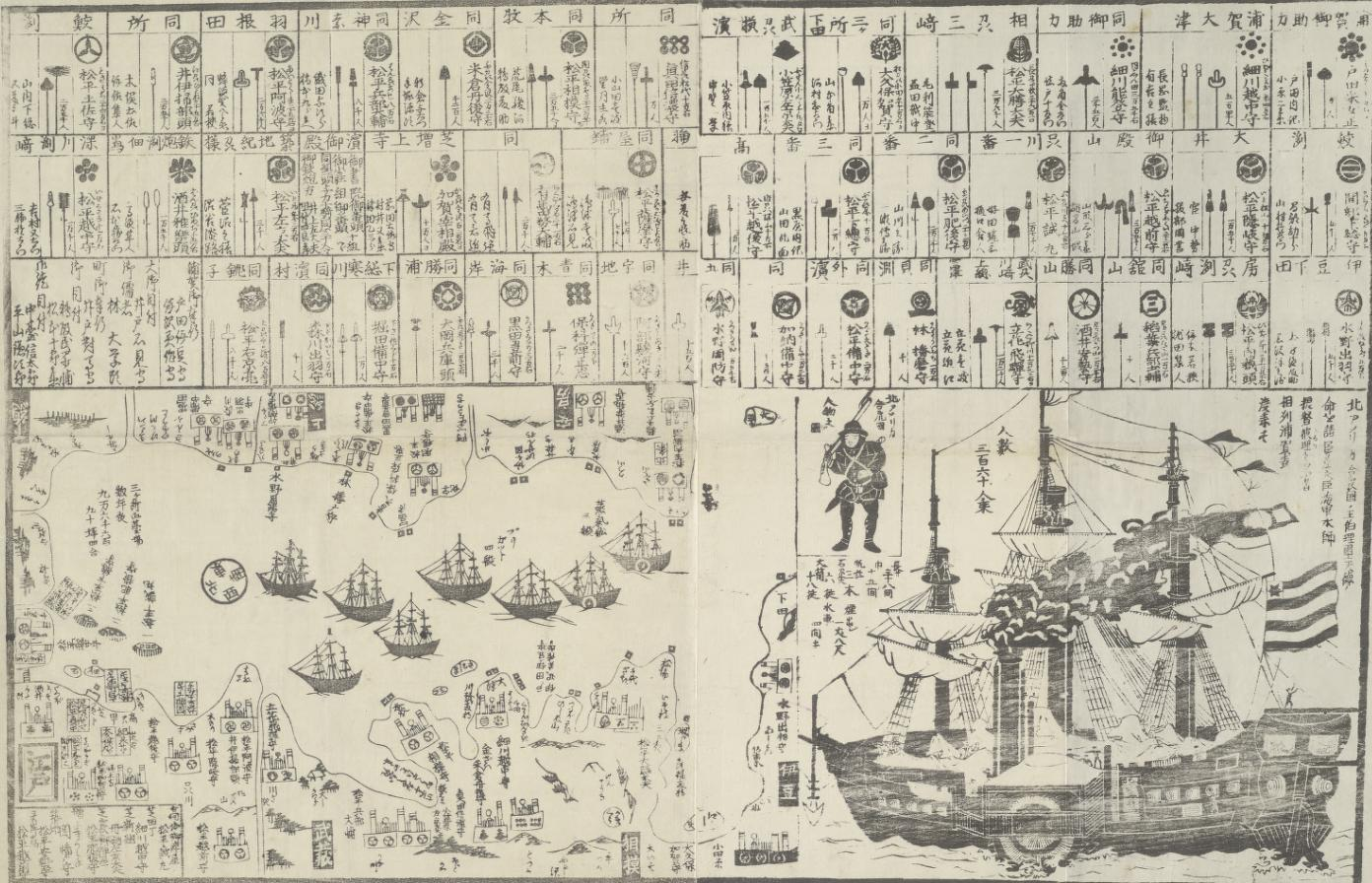
- A 1854 Japanese print depicting the Perry Expedition
- Date: July 14, 1853; 173 years ago
- Location: Uraga, Kanagawa
- Cause: Diplomacy, trade
- Organised by: President Millard Fillmore
- Participants: Commodore Matthew C. Perry; Toda "Izu-no-kami" Ujiyoshi "Iwami-no-kami" Hiromichi; Franklin Buchanan
- Outcome: End of isolationist policy of Japan
- Awards: $20,000 for Commodore Perry
- Footage: history.state.gov/milestones/1830-1860/opening-to-japan Additional daguerreotypes by Eliphalet M. Brown Jr

The Perry Expedition (Japanese: 黒船来航, kurofune raikō, "Arrival of the Black Ships") was a diplomatic and military expedition in two separate voyages (1852–1853 and 1854–1855) to the Tokugawa shogunate (徳川幕府) by warships of the United States Navy. The goals of this expedition included exploration, surveying, and the establishment of diplomatic relations and negotiation of trade agreements with the various nations in the region. Opening contact with the government of Japan was considered a top priority of the expedition, and was one of the key reasons for its inception.

The expedition was commanded by Commodore Matthew Calbraith Perry, under orders from President Millard Fillmore. Perry's primary goal was to force an end to Japan's 220-year-old policy of isolation and to open Japanese ports to American trade, through the use of gunboat diplomacy if necessary. The Perry Expedition led directly to the establishment of diplomatic relations between Japan and the western Great Powers, and eventually to the collapse of the ruling Tokugawa shogunate and the restoration of the Emperor. Following the expedition, Japan's burgeoning trade routes with the world led to the cultural trend of Japonisme, in which aspects of Japanese culture influenced art in Europe and America.

== Background ==
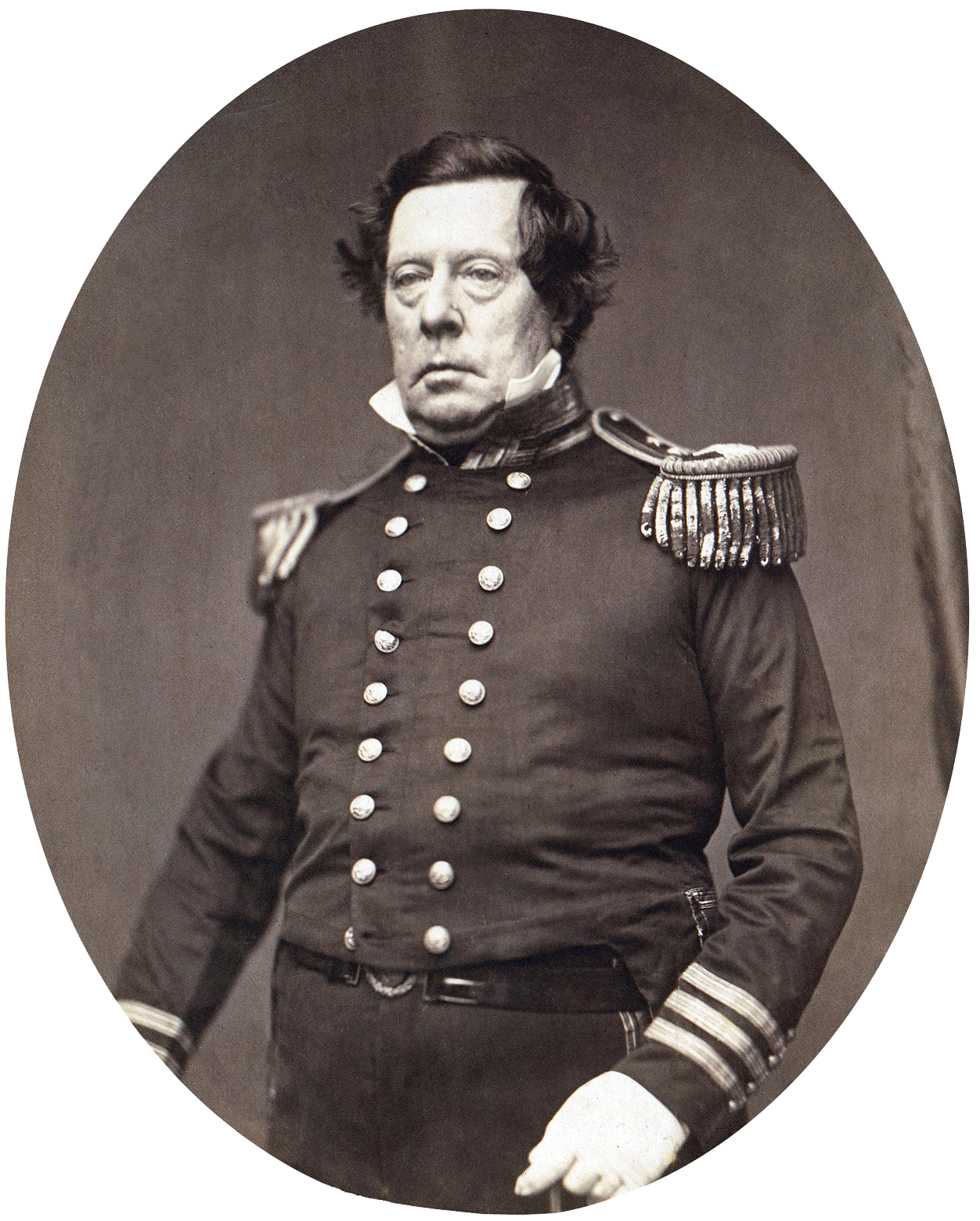
Commodore Matthew Perry

Growing commerce between America and China, the presence of American whalers in waters off Japan, and the increasing monopolization of potential coaling stations by European colonial powers in Asia were all contributing factors in the decision by President Fillmore to dispatch an expedition to Japan. Shipwrecked Westerners were treated harshly or even executed in Japan, under the policy of Sakoku, including sailors from the American whaling ship the Lawrence in 1846. The Americans were also driven by concepts of manifest destiny and the desire to impose the benefits of Western civilization and the Christian religion on what they perceived as backward Asian nations.

By the early 19th century, the Japanese policy of isolation was increasingly under challenge. In 1844, Dutch King William II sent a letter urging Japan to end the isolation policy on its own before change would be forced from the outside. Between 1790 and 1853, at least twenty-seven U.S. ships, including three warships, visited Japan, only to be turned away.

There were increased sightings and incursions of foreign ships into Japanese waters, and this led to considerable internal debate in Japan on how best to meet this potential threat to Japan's economic and political sovereignty. In May 1851, American Secretary of State Daniel Webster authorized Commodore John H. Aulick, commander of the American East India Squadron, to attempt to return seventeen shipwrecked Japanese sailors residing in San Francisco, which might provide the opportunity for opening commercial relations with Japan. On May 10, 1851, Webster drafted a letter addressed to the "Japanese Emperor" with assurances that the expedition had no religious purpose but was only to request "friendship and commerce" and supplies of coal needed by American ships en route to China.

The letter also boasted of American expansion across the North American continent and its technical prowess, and was signed by President Fillmore. However, Aulick became involved in a diplomatic row with a Brazilian diplomat and quarrels with the captain of his flagship, and was relieved of his command before he could undertake the Japan expedition. His replacement, Commodore Matthew Calbraith Perry, was a senior-ranking officer in the United States Navy, and had extensive diplomatic experience.

Expedition Architects

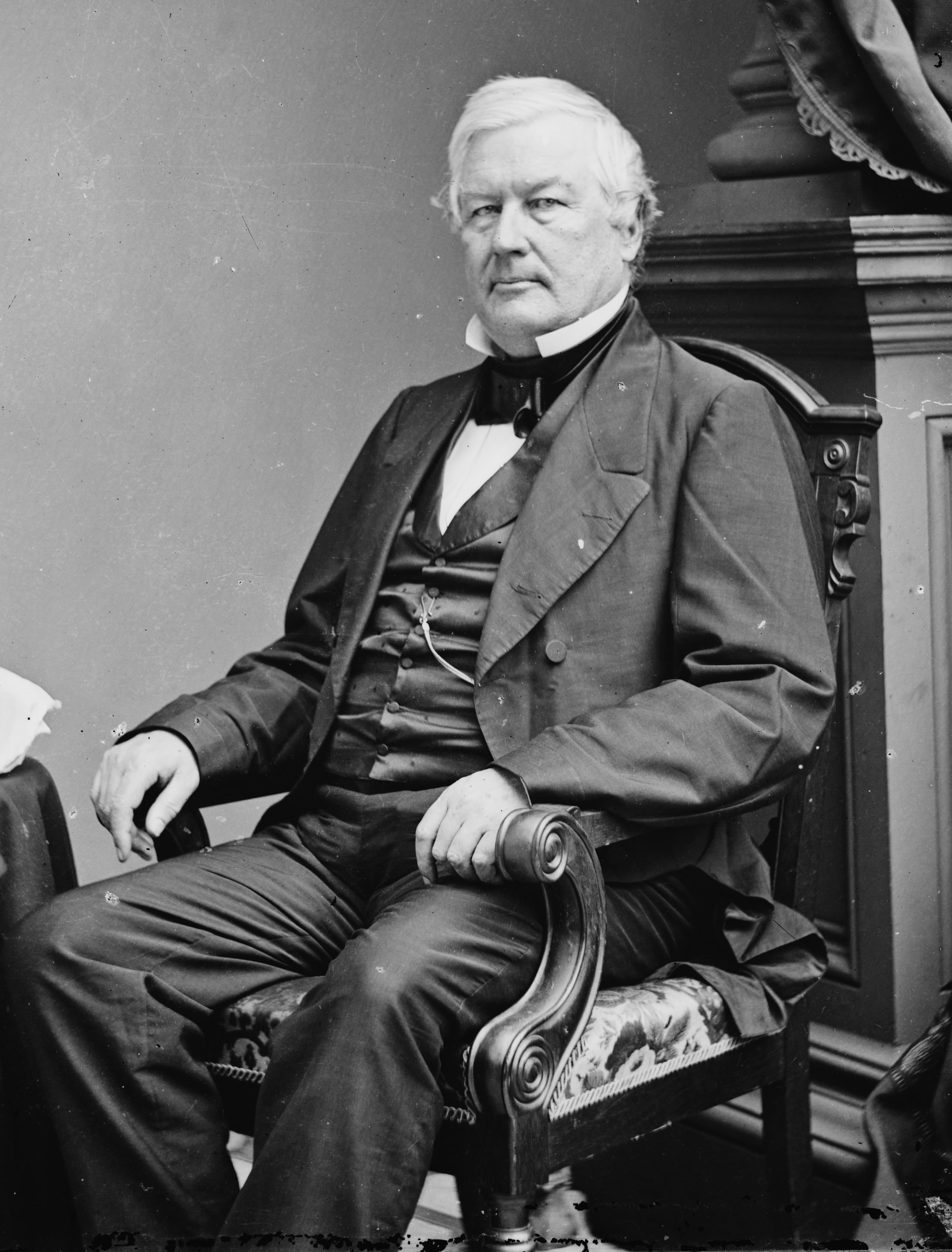
Fillmore

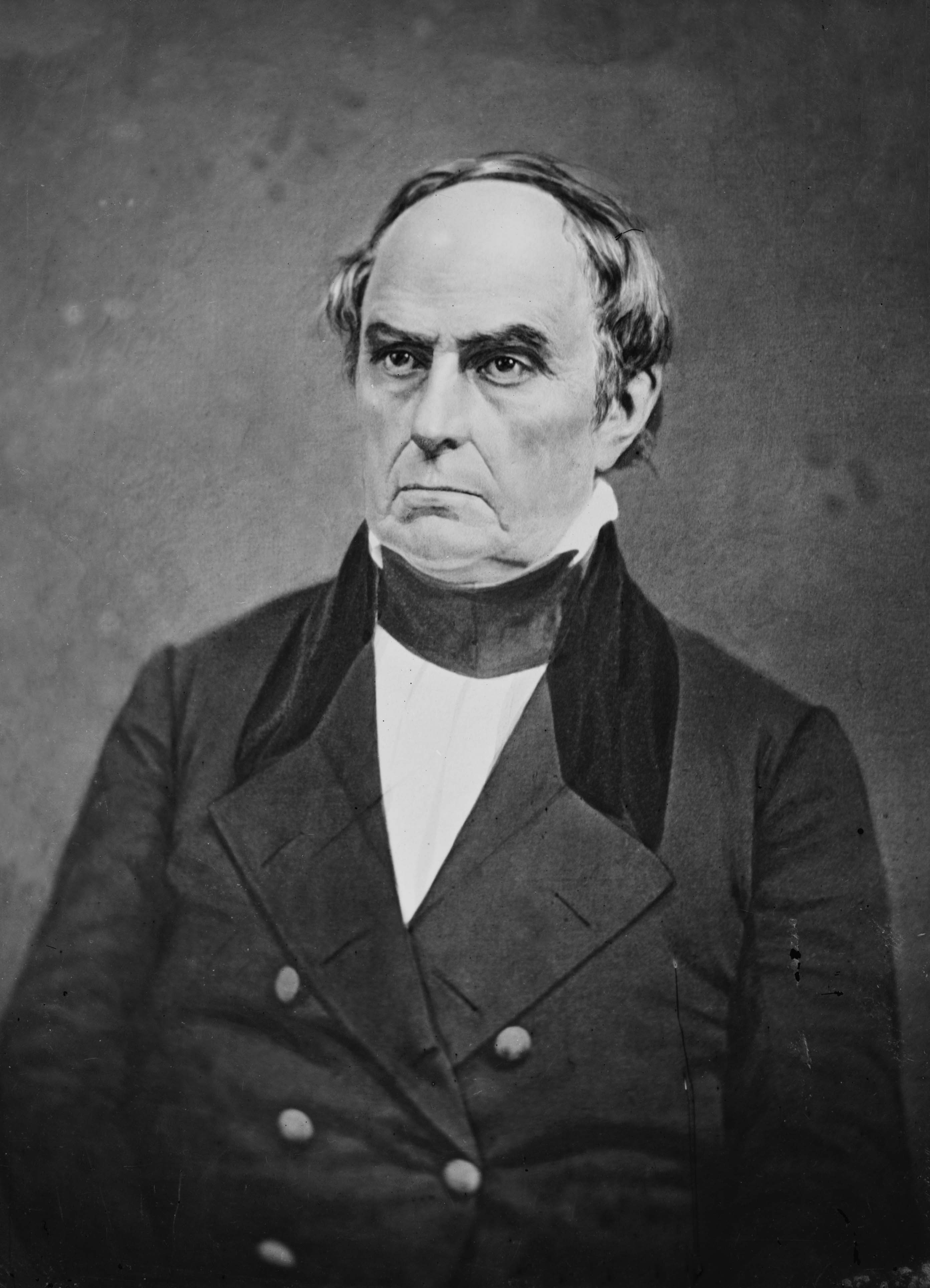
Webster

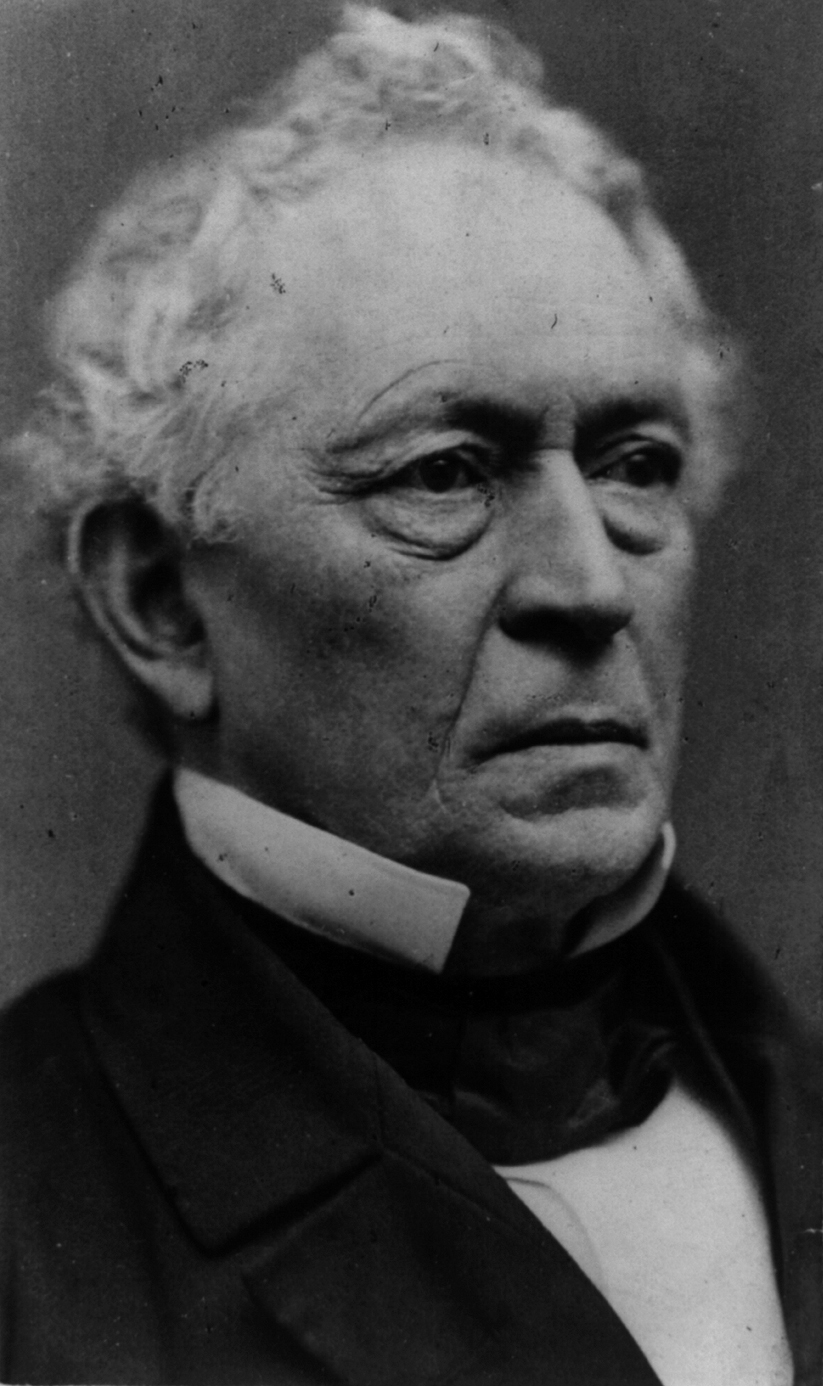
Everett

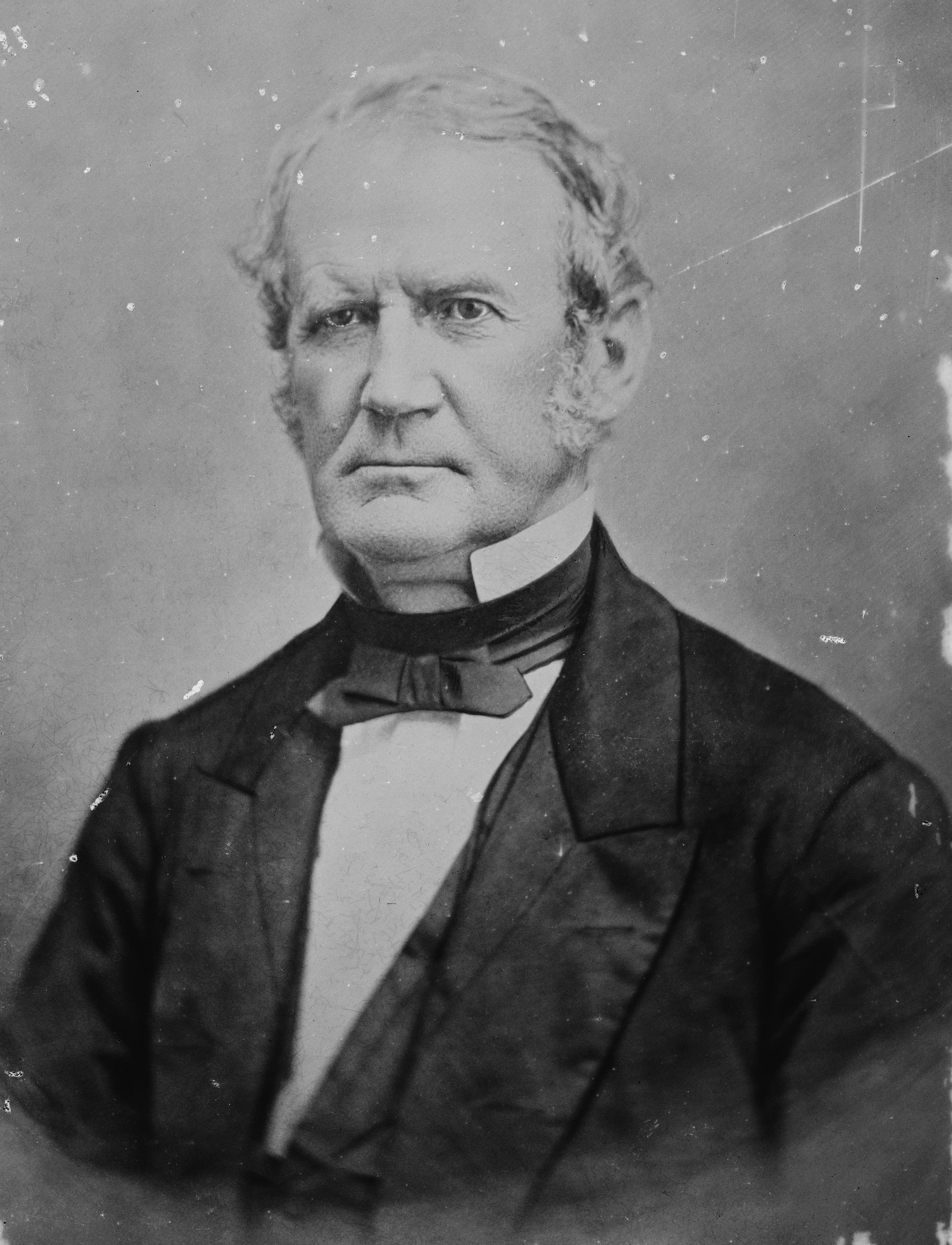
Graham

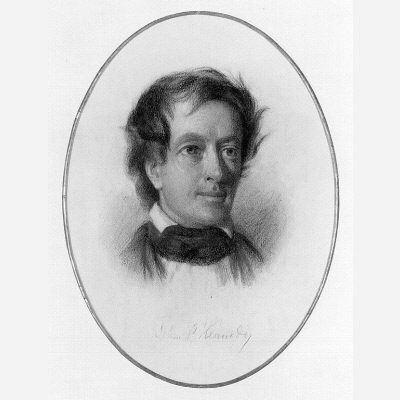
Kennedy

Left to right: Fillmore, Webster, Everett, Graham, Kennedy

== Preparation ==
Perry was well aware of the difficulties involved in attempting to establish relations with Japan and initially protested that he would prefer to command the Mediterranean Squadron of the U.S. Navy instead of being assigned to yet another attempt to open Japan, which he considered unlikely to win. Relevant precedents included:

- From 1797 to 1809, several American ships traded in Nagasaki under the Dutch flag upon the request of the Dutch, who were not able to send their own ships because of their conflict with the United Kingdom during the Napoleonic Wars.
- In 1837, an American businessman in Canton (Guangzhou) named Charles W. King saw an opportunity to open trade by trying to return to Japan three Japanese sailors (among them, Otokichi) who had been shipwrecked a few years before on the coast of Washington. He went to Uraga Channel with Morrison, an American merchant ship. The ship was attacked several times and sailed back without completing its mission.
- In 1846, Commander James Biddle, anchored in Edo Bay on an official mission with two ships, including one warship armed with seventy-two cannons, asking for ports to be opened for trade, but his requests for a trade agreement remained unsuccessful.
- In 1849, Captain James Glynn sailed to Nagasaki, leading at last to the first successful negotiation by an American with Japan. James Glynn recommended to the United States Congress that negotiations to open Japan be backed up by a demonstration of force, thus paving the way for Perry's expedition.

In addition to Perry's preparations, discussions were taking place in the halls of Congress and marine industry lobbyists. Most famously the Director of the American and Foreign Agency, a prominent trade advocacy firm of the time, Aaron Haight Palmer wrote a letter to Secretary of State John M. Clayton in 1849 urging forward the Perry Expedition. In advance of his voyage, Perry read widely amongst available books about Japan. His research also included consultation with the Japanologist Philipp Franz von Siebold. Siebold spent eight years working, teaching, and studying at the isolated Dutch island-trading post of Dejima in Nagasaki harbour before returning to Leiden in the Netherlands. Perry also demanded greater latitude in his orders from Webster, a demand the Secretary of State granted just before his death in October 1852. Perry thus sailed for Japan with "full and discretionary powers", including possible use of force if the Japanese tried to treat him as they had Commodore Biddle. Perry also refused to allow any professional diplomats to accompany the expedition. He asked the German painter Wilhelm Heine and pioneer daguerreotype photographer Eliphalet M. Brown Jr. to join the expedition as official artists. Agricultural specialist Dr. James Morrow was assigned by the US State Department. Several Japanese castaways were also taken on as unofficial interpreters.

The expedition was assigned the steam warships Mississippi, Susquehanna, and Powhatan, the armed store steamships Lexington, Supply, and Southampton, and the sailing sloops Macedonian, Plymouth, and Saratoga. To command his fleet, Perry chose officers with whom he had served in the Mexican–American War. Commander Franklin Buchanan was captain of Susquehanna and Joel Abbot was captain of Macedonian. Commander Henry A. Adams became the Commodore's chief of staff with the title "Captain of the Fleet". Major Jacob Zeilin (future commandant of the United States Marine Corps) was the ranking Marine officer, and was stationed on Mississippi. Perry also received permission to take government stores as gifts for the natives, especially obsolete small arms. These included 40 M1819 Hall rifles (with 4,000 cartridges), 20 percussion pistols (with 2,000 cartridges), 20 artillery swords, 20 muskets with Maynard percussion locks and 40 light cavalry sabers, as well as 100 Colt revolvers.

== First visit to Japan, 1852–1853 ==
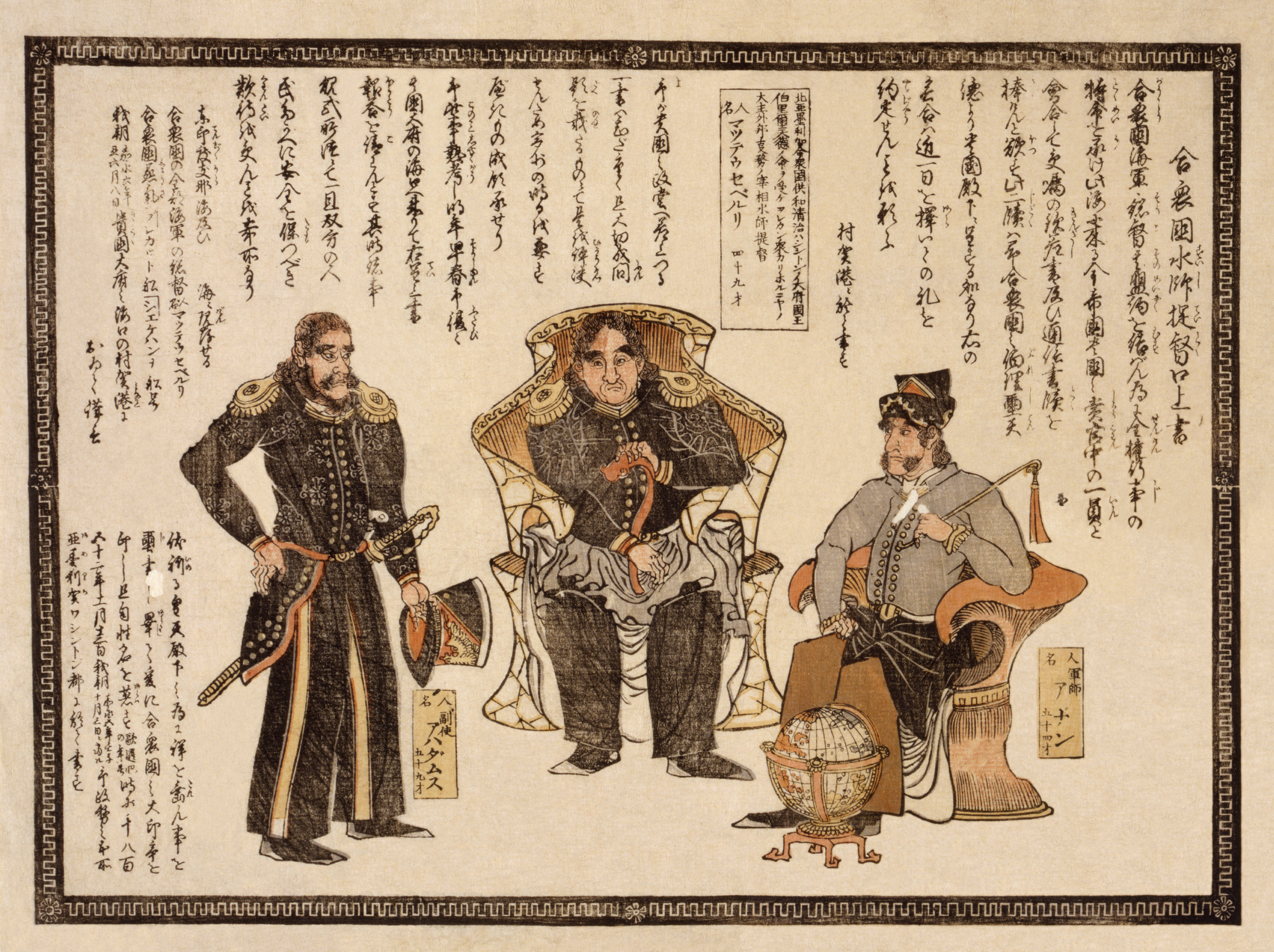
A Japanese woodblock print of Perry (center) and other high-ranking American seamen

Perry chose the black-hulled paddle-wheeled Mississippi as his flagship, and cleared Hampton Roads, Virginia on November 24, 1852. Perry made port calls at Madeira (December 11–15), St Helena (January 10–11), Cape Town (January 24 – February 3), Mauritius (February 18–28), Ceylon (March 10–15), Singapore (March 25–29), and Macao and Hong Kong (April 7–28). There he met with American-born Sinologist Samuel Wells Williams (who had been to Japan with the Morrison in 1837), who provided Chinese-language translations of Perry's official letters, and rendezvoused with Plymouth and Saratoga. He continued to Shanghai (May 4–17), where he met with the Dutch-born American diplomat Anton L. C. Portman, who translated his official letters into the Dutch language, and rendezvoused with Susquehanna.

Perry then switched his flag to Susquehanna and called on the Ryukyu Islands from May 17–26. Ignoring the claims of Satsuma Domain to the islands, as well as his own orders, he threatened and bluffed local authorities by threatening to attack with 200 troops unless he were allowed trading rights and land for a coaling station. Perry landed his Marines, whom he drilled on the beach for hours at a time, and demanded an audience with the Ryukyu King Shō Tai at Shuri Castle. Knowing that his every action would be reported to Japanese authorities in Edo, Perry carefully avoided meeting with low-ranked officials and made much use of military ceremony and shipboard hospitality to demonstrate both American military power and the peaceful intent of his expedition. Perry left with promises that the islands would be completely open to trade with the United States. Continuing on the Ogasawara Islands in mid-June, Perry met with the local inhabitants and even purchased a plot of land.

=== Threat of force and negotiation ===
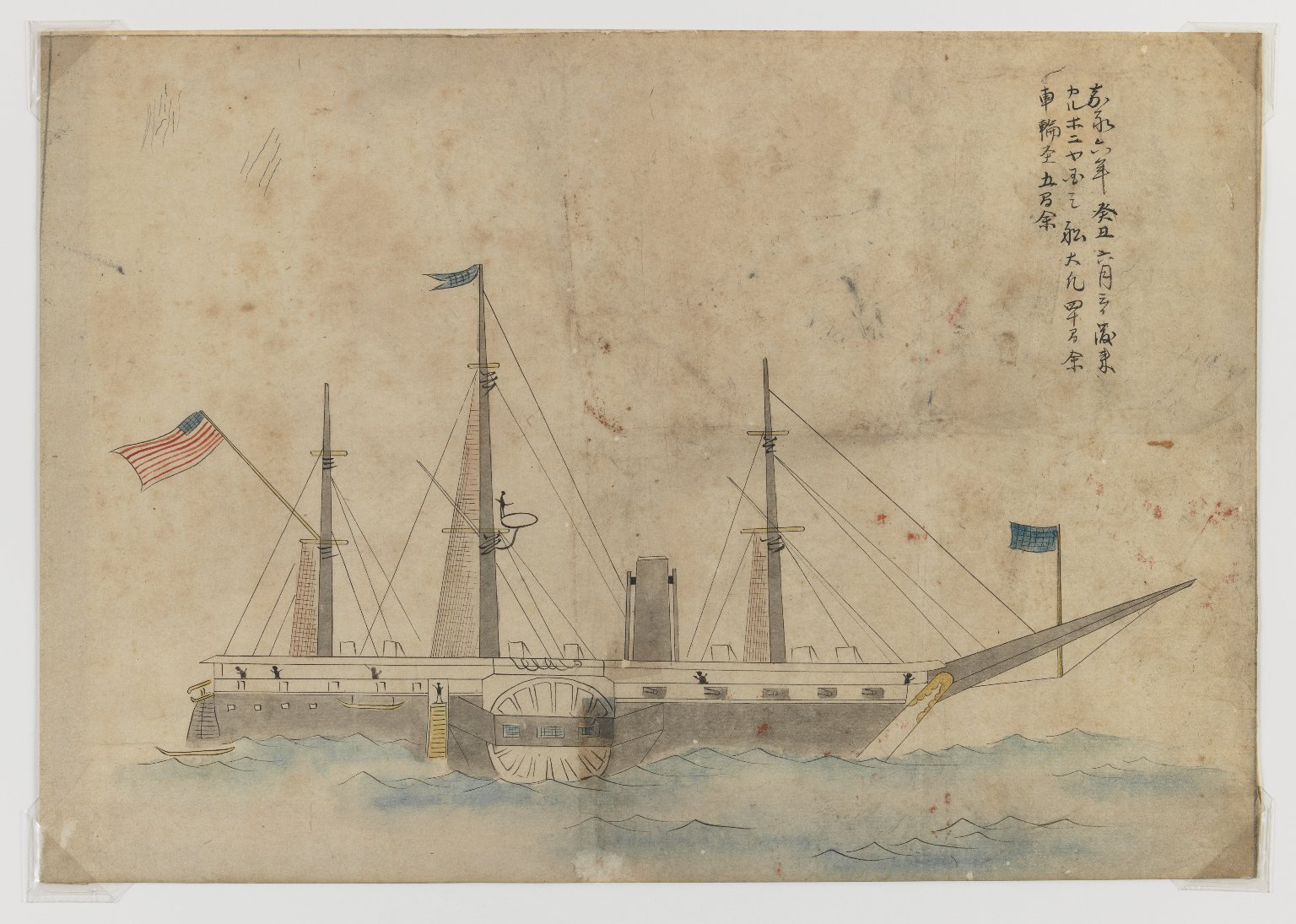
Commodore Matthew Perry's Black Ship, from the Brooklyn Museum

Perry finally reached Uraga at the entrance to Edo Bay in Japan on July 8, 1853. His fleet at this time consisted of four vessels: Susquehanna, Mississippi, Plymouth and Saratoga. As he arrived, Perry ordered his ships to steam past Japanese lines towards the capital of Edo, and position their guns towards the town of Uraga. He also fired blank shots from his 73 cannons, which he claimed was in celebration of the American Independence Day. Perry's ships were equipped with new Paixhans shell guns, cannons capable of wreaking great explosive destruction with every shell.

The American ships were almost surrounded by Japanese guard boats; however, Perry ordered that any attempt at boarding was to be repelled. One boat carried a large sign in French ordering the American fleet to depart immediately. On 9 July, 1853, a yoriki from the Uraga bugyō, Nakajima Saburosuke, accompanied by interpreter Hori Tatsunosuke, rowed out to Susquehanna, but were at first refused permission to come on board. After some negotiation, they were permitted to board, where they displayed the order that no foreign ships were allowed into Japanese ports. Perry remained in his cabin and refused to meet them, sending word through his officers that as he carried a letter from the President of the United States, he would only deal with officials of sufficient stature and authority.

On 10 July, 1853, yoriki Kayama Eizaemon, pretending to be the Uraga bugyō, called on Susquehanna and was allowed to meet Captain Franklin, whom he advised to travel to Nagasaki, as this was the designated port for all foreign contact. Kayama was told that unless a suitable official came to receive the document, Perry would land troops and march on Edo, to deliver the letter in person. Kayama asked for three days in order to respond. The actual Uraga bugyō, Ido Hiromichi, sent a report to the shōgun and advised that his defenses were totally inadequate to repel the Americans by force.

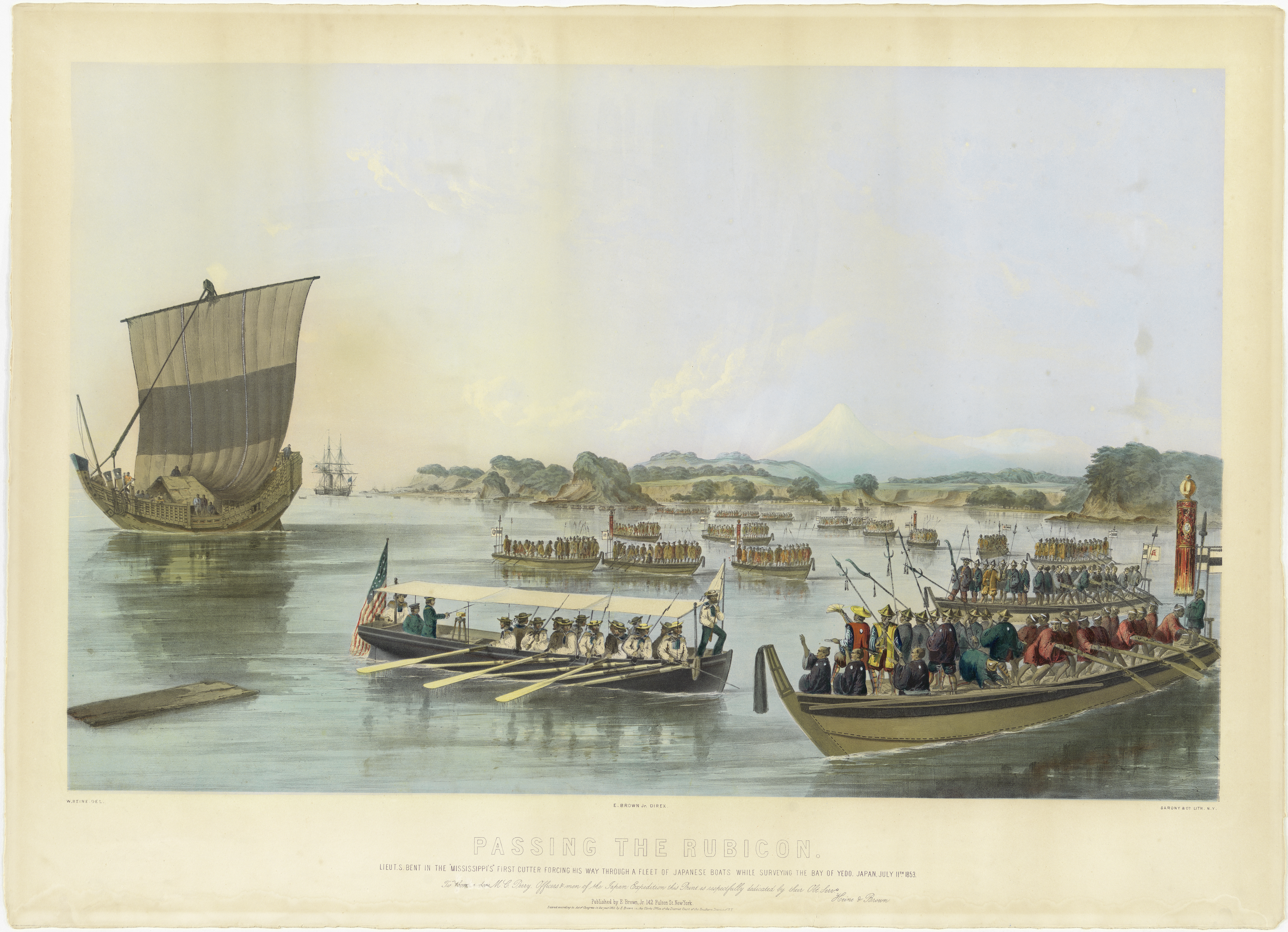
Passing the Rubicon by Eliphalet M. Brown depicts Lieutenant Silas Bent leading an armed American survey boat through a fleet of Japanese guard boats in Edo Bay on July 11, 1853

In the meantime, Perry began a campaign of intimidation, by sending boats to survey the surrounding area, and threatened to use force if the Japanese guard boats around the American squadron did not disperse. He also presented the Japanese with a white flag and a letter which told them that in case they chose combat, the Americans would necessarily vanquish them.

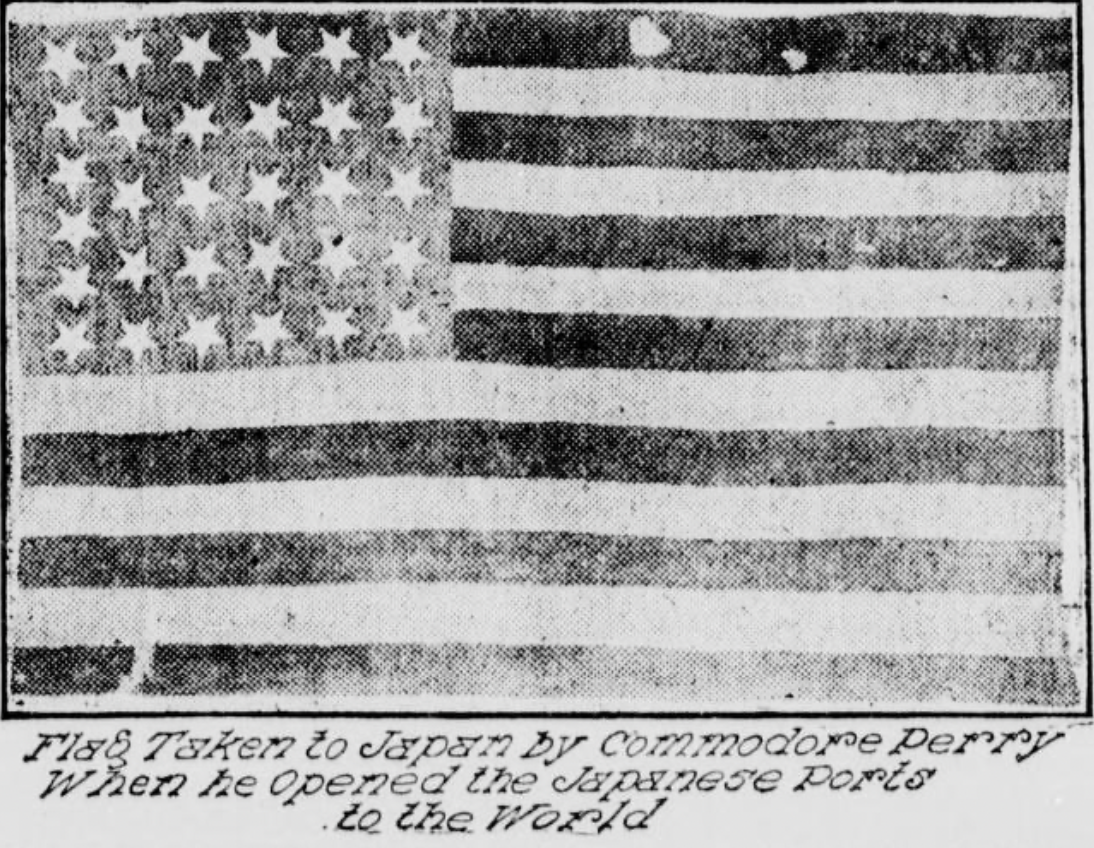
Commodore Perry's flag

The Japanese government was paralyzed due to the incapacitation by illness of Shōgun Tokugawa Ieyoshi and by political indecision on how to handle the unprecedented threat to the nation's capital. On July 11, 1853, senior rōjū Abe Masahiro temporized, deciding that simply accepting a letter from the Americans would not constitute a violation of Japanese sovereignty. The decision was conveyed to Uraga, and Perry was asked to move his fleet slightly southwest to the beach at Kurihama (in modern-day Yokosuka), where he was allowed to land on 14 July. Perry went ashore with considerable pomp, landing with 250 sailors and Marines in 15 ships' boats after a 13-gun salute from Susquehanna. Major Zeilin's Marines presented arms, and a band played "Hail Columbia". President Fillmore's letter was formally received by hatamoto Toda "Izu-no-kami" Ujiyoshi and by Ido "Iwami-no-kami" Hiromichi. Perry's squadron eventually departed on 17 July for the Chinese coast, promising to return for a reply.

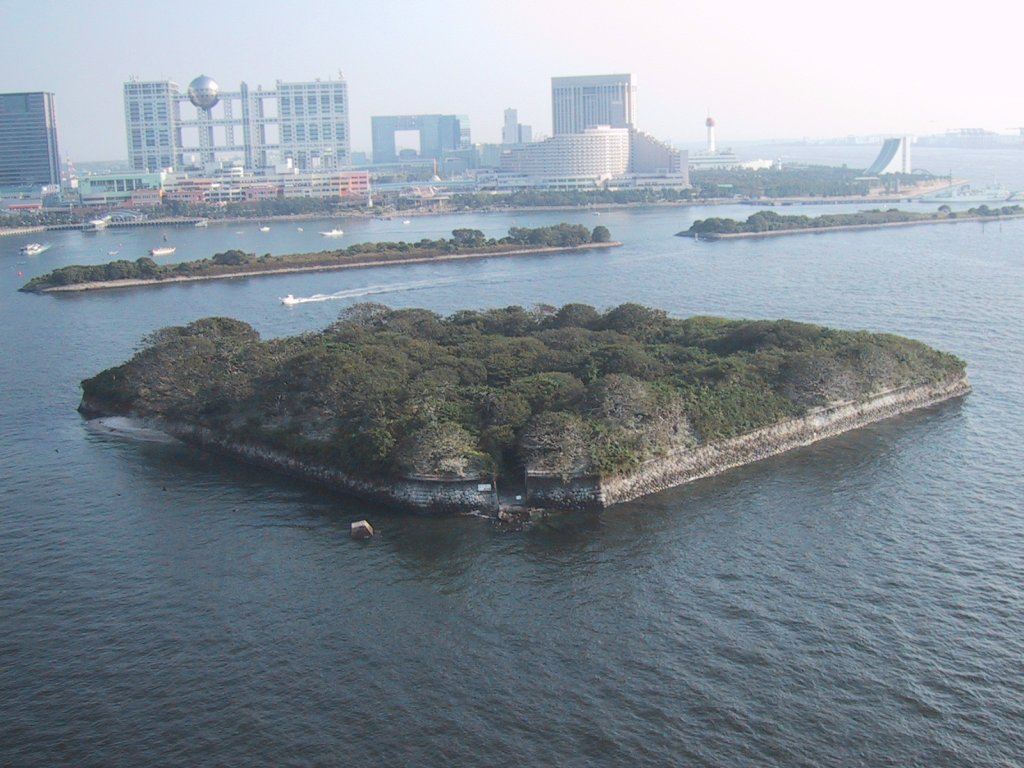
Odaiba battery at the entrance of Tokyo, built in 1853–54 to prevent a United States incursion

After Perry's departure, an extensive debate ensued within the shogunal court on how to respond to the American's implied threats. Shōgun Tokugawa Ieyoshi died days after Perry's departure, and was succeeded by his sickly young son, Tokugawa Iesada, leaving effective administration in the hands of the Council of Elders (rōjū) led by Abe Masahiro. Abe felt that it was currently impossible for Japan to resist the American demands by military force, and yet was reluctant to take any action on his own authority for such an unprecedented situation. Attempting to legitimize any decision taken, Abe polled all of the daimyōs for their opinions. This was the first time that the Tokugawa shogunate had allowed its decision-making to be a matter of public debate, and had the unforeseen consequence of portraying the shogunate as weak and indecisive.

The results of the poll also failed to provide Abe with an answer, as of the 61 known responses, 19 were in favor of accepting the American demands, and 19 were equally opposed. Of the remainder, 14 gave vague responses expressing concern of possible war, 7 suggested making temporary concessions and two advised that they would simply go along with whatever was decided. The only universal recommendation was that steps be taken immediately to bolster Japan's coastal defenses. Fortifications were hurriedly built close to current day Odaiba in order to protect Edo from a subsequent American naval incursion.

== Second visit to Japan, 1854 ==
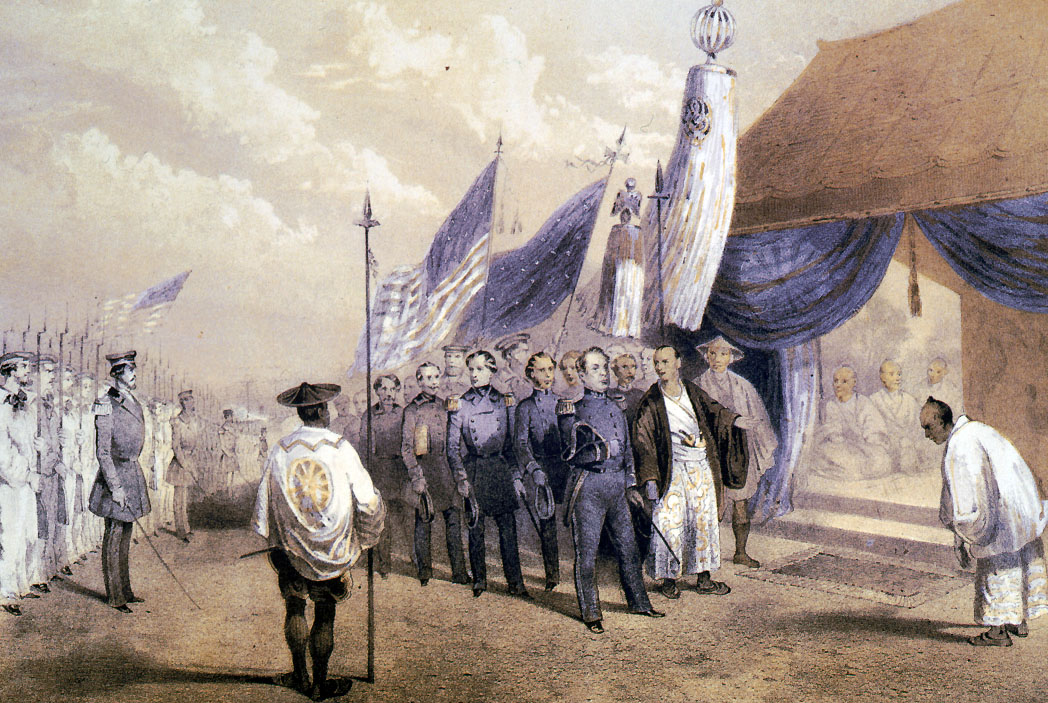
Commodore Matthew C. Perry, USN, Landed at Yokohama, Japan on 8 March 1854 with 500 men, amid pomp and ceremony, and received the answer to President Fillmore’s letter which he had personally delivered. Artist: W. Peters. Lithograph by Sabony & Co. Courtesy of the Library of Congress, 3G03379U.

Although he had told the Japanese that he would return the following year, Perry soon learned that Russian Vice-Admiral Yevfimiy Putyatin had called in at Nagasaki shortly after he departed from Edo Bay, and had spent a month attempting to force the Japanese to sign a treaty before his return. He also was told by both the British and French that they intended to accompany him to Japan in the spring to ensure that the Americans did not obtain any exclusive privileges. Perry thus returned on 13 February 1854 with eight vessels and 1600 men. The fleet had lost Plymouth of the original four, and now also included: Lexington, Macedonian, Powhatan, Vandalia, and Southampton. Supply arrived loaded with coal and stores on 19 March, bringing the total strength to nine.

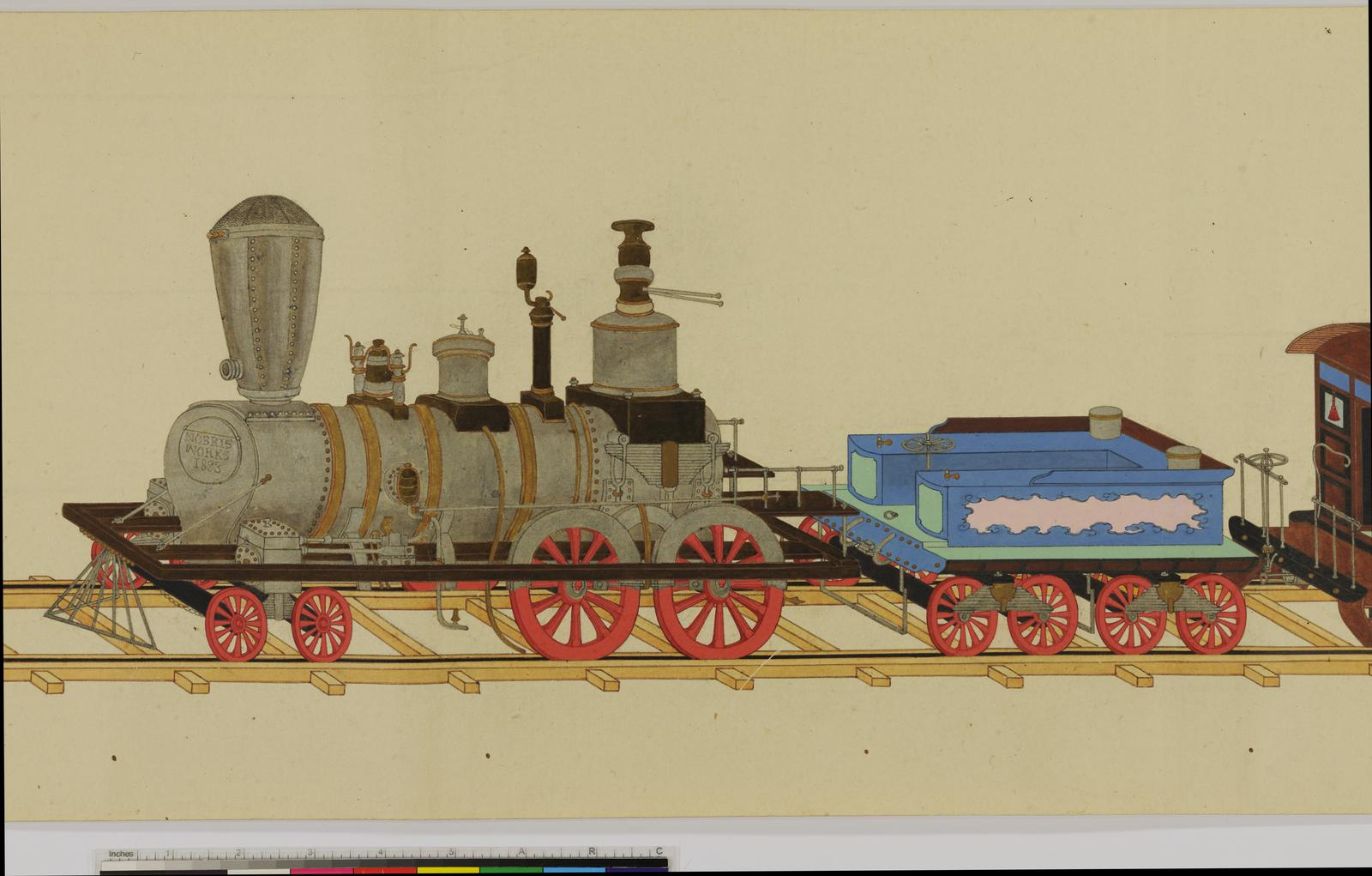
A miniature steam locomotive which was presented by the expedition and exhibited to great acclaim

By the time of Perry's return, the Tokugawa shogunate had decided to accept virtually all the demands in Fillmore's letter. However, negotiators procrastinated for weeks over the site for negotiations, with Perry insisting on Edo, and the Japanese offering various other locations. Perry eventually lost his temper and threatened to bring 100 ships (more than the actual size of the US Navy at the time) within 20 days to war on Japan. Both sides eventually compromised on the tiny village of Yokohama, where a purpose-built hall was erected. Perry landed on 8 March with 500 sailors and Marines in 27 ships' boats, with three bands playing "The Star-Spangled Banner". Three weeks of negotiation ensued, accompanied by diplomatic gestures such as the exchange of state gifts. The Americans presented the Japanese with a miniature steam locomotive, a telegraph apparatus, various agricultural tools, and small arms, as well as one hundred gallons of whiskey, clocks, stoves, and books about the United States. The Japanese responded with gold-lacquered furniture and boxes, bronze ornaments, silk and brocade garments, porcelain goblets, and upon learning of Perry's personal hobby, a collection of seashells. Cultural displays were also performed on both sides, with the American sailors aboard the Powhatan putting on a minstrel show, while a number of high-ranking sumo wrestlers performed feats of strength and held exhibition matches.

Hakodadi Conference Room meeting in May 1854. By W. Heine and the Sarony Lithography Company

Finally, on March 31, 1854, Perry signed the Convention of Kanagawa which opened the ports of Shimoda and Hakodate to American ships, provided for care of shipwrecked sailors, and the establishment of an American consulate in Shimoda. The treaty was signed on the Japanese side by Hayashi Akira. Perry then dispatched the Saratoga home with the signed treaty, while the rest of the squadron went to survey Hakodate, Shimoda and the site of the future consulate. After departing from Shimoda, the fleet returned to the Ryukyu Islands, where Perry swiftly drafted the "Compact between the United States and the Ryukyu Kingdom," which was formally signed on July 11, 1854.

== Return to the United States, 1855 ==
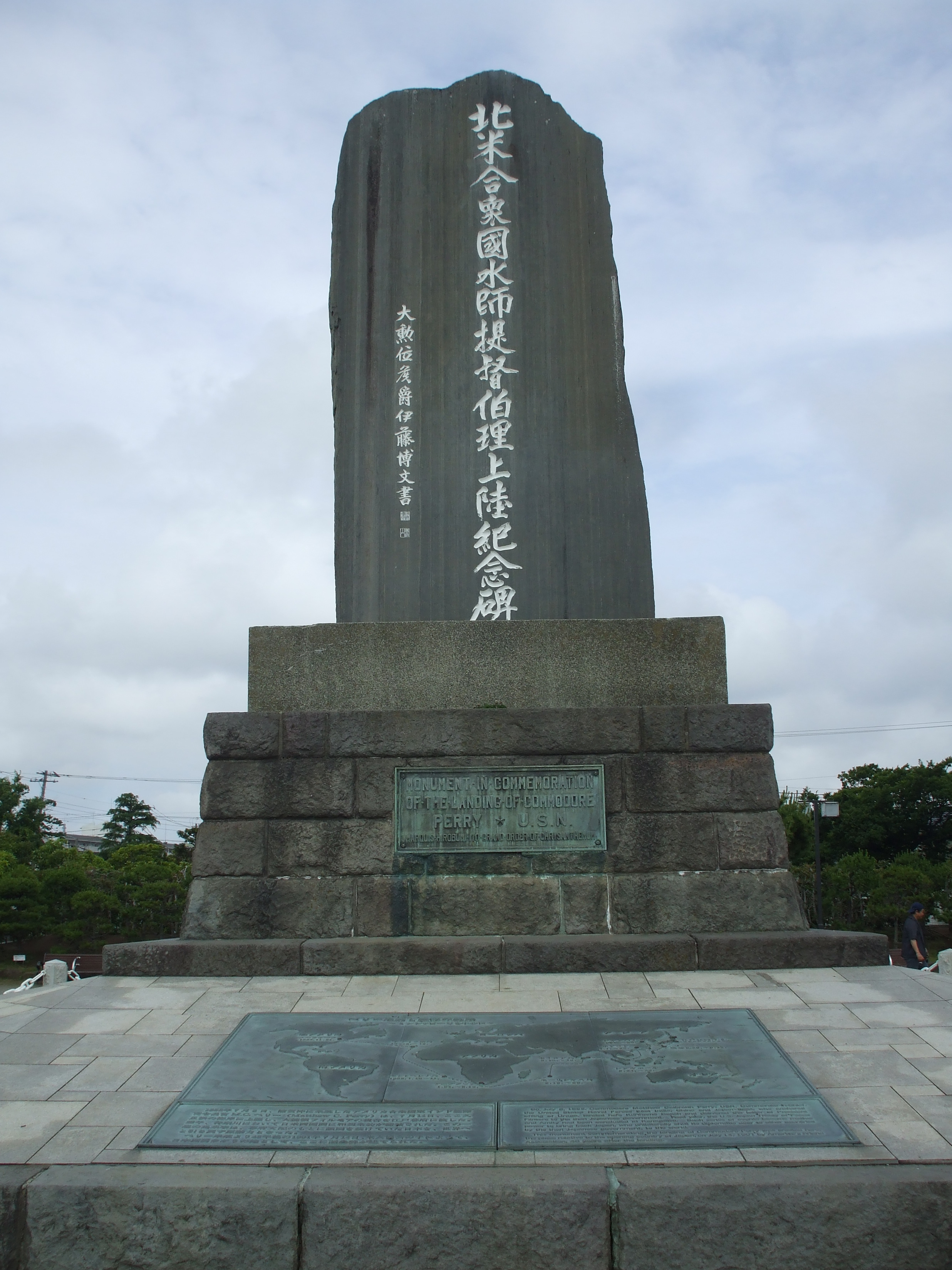
Monument to Perry Expedition in Kurihama, Yokosuka

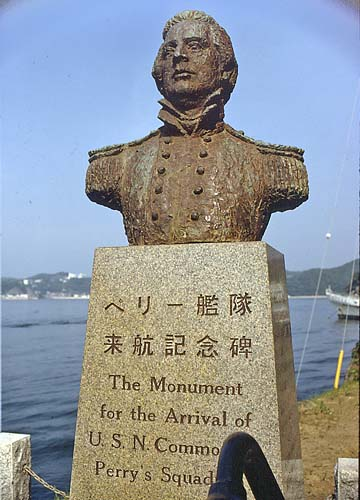
A bust of Matthew Perry in Shimoda, Shizuoka

After Perry returned to the United States in 1855, Congress voted to grant him a reward of $20,000 (~$737,000 in 2022) in appreciation of his work in Japan. Perry used part of this money to prepare and publish a report of the expedition in three volumes, titled Narrative of the Expedition of an American Squadron to the China Seas and Japan. This was written by Francis L. Hawks under Perry's supervision, using the written materials compiled by Perry and his colleagues during the expedition. It was first presented as a report to the United States Senate in 1856 and later published commercially. Perry was also promoted to the rank of rear-admiral on the retired list (when his health began to fail) as a reward for his services. He was known to have suffered severe arthritis that left him in frequent pain and on occasion prevented him from fulfilling his duties.

Perry spent his last years preparing for publication of his account of the Japan expedition, announcing its completion on 28 December 1857. Two days later he was detached from his last post, an assignment to the Naval Efficiency Board. He died awaiting further orders on 4 March 1858 in New York City, of rheumatism that had spread to the heart, compounded by complications of gout.

== See also ==
- List of Westerners who visited Japan before 1868
- History of Japan
- Meiji Restoration
- Yokohama Archives of History
- Pacific Overtures
- General Sherman incident, similar event in Korea
- 1852 State of the Union Address
