= USS Abbot (DD-184) =

Wickes-class destroyer

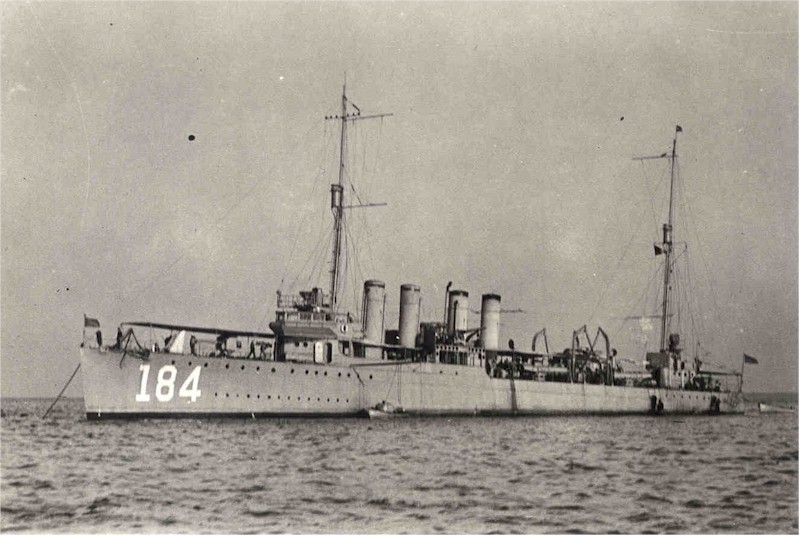

History

United States
- Name: USS Abbot
- Namesake: Joel Abbot
- Builder: Newport News Shipbuilding and Drydock Company, Newport News, Virginia
- Laid down: 5 April 1918
- Launched: 4 July 1918
- Commissioned: 19 July 1919
- Decommissioned: 5 July 1922
- Commissioned: 17 June 1940
- Decommissioned: 23 September 1940
- Stricken: 8 January 1941
- Identification: DD-184
- Fate: Transferred to United Kingdom, 23 September 1940

United Kingdom
- Name: HMS Charlestown
- Commissioned: 23 September 1940
- Decommissioned: 15 January 1945
- Identification: Pennant number:I21
- Fate: Scrapped, 1947

General characteristics
- Class & type: Wickes-class destroyer
- Displacement: 1,306 long tons (1,327 t)
- Length: 314 ft 4 in (95.81 m)
- Beam: 30 ft 11 in (9.42 m)
- Draught: 9 ft 4 in (2.84 m)
- Propulsion: 2 × steam turbines; 2 × shafts
- Speed: 35 knots (65 km/h; 40 mph)
- Complement: 122 officers and enlisted
- Armament: 4 × 4 in (102 mm)/50 guns; 2 × 3 in (76 mm)/23 guns; 12 × 21 inch (533 mm) torpedo tubes

The first USS Abbot (DD-184) was a Wickes-class destroyer in the service of the United States Navy until traded to Britain at the beginning of World War II. She served in the Royal Navy as HMS Charlestown (I21), a Town-class destroyer.

== Service history ==
=== As USS Abbot ===
Named after Commodore Joel Abbot, she was laid down on 5 April 1918 by the Newport News Shipbuilding and Drydock Company, Newport News, Virginia, launched on 4 July 1918, sponsored by Miss Louise Abbot, great-granddaughter of Cdre. Abbot, and commissioned on 19 July 1919.

Based at Norfolk, Virginia, Abbot operated along the east coast and in the Gulf of Mexico and the Caribbean, especially in Cuban waters. The destroyer was placed out of commission at the Philadelphia Navy Yard on 5 July 1922.

After being laid up for almost 20 years, Abbot was recommissioned on 17 June 1940 and patrolled along the east coast until going out of commission once more at Halifax, in Nova Scotia, on 23 September 1940 to be transferred to Britain under terms of the agreement by which the U.S. exchanged 50 overage destroyers for bases on British colonial territory in the Atlantic. Abbot was struck from the Navy list on 8 January 1941.

=== As HMS Charlestown ===
Temporarily named HMS Abbot and then quickly renamed HMS Charlestown, the destroyer was assigned to the 17th Destroyer Division and arrived at Belfast, Northern Ireland on 8 October. She took part in several minelaying operations along the west coast of Scotland. In September 1943, Charlestown was allocated to the Rosyth Escort Force to escort convoys along the east coast of Britain.

Charlestown was damaged in a collision with the minesweeper HMS Florizel off Harwich, England in December 1944. Due to her age, it was decided not to repair her, and the destroyer was placed in reserve at Grangemouth, Firth of Forth. Charlestown was decommissioned on 15 January 1945 and was eventually scrapped.
