= USS Southampton (1841) =

Decommissioned American store ship

History

United States
- Name: USS Southampton
- Laid down: October 1841
- Acquired: by purchase, 1845
- Commissioned: 27 May 1845
- Decommissioned: 6 April 1855
- Fate: Sold into mercantile service, 1855

General characteristics
- Type: Store ship
- Displacement: 567 long tons (576 t)
- Length: 156 ft (48 m)
- Beam: 27 ft 10 in (8.48 m)
- Draft: 13 ft 6 in (4.11 m)
- Depth of hold: 17 ft (5.2 m)
- Armament: 2 × 42-pounder carronades

The first USS Southampton was a store ship in the United States Navy during the Mexican–American War.

Southampton was laid down at Norfolk, Virginia as a side wheel steamer in October 1841, but her machinery proved to be unsatisfactory and was removed. Apparently purchased by the United States Government in 1845, the ship was commissioned on 27 May 1845, Lieutenant Henry W. Morris in command.

== Service history ==
=== Africa Squadron, 1845–1846 ===
The ship departed Norfolk on 27 June 1845 and sailed for the coast of Africa where she served as a store ship for the cruisers of the Africa Squadron. Southampton returned to Hampton Roads on 16 December 1846 and was repaired at the Norfolk Navy Yard. On 29 November 1846, she rescued the crew of the British merchant ship Almira, which had capsized a week earlier in the Atlantic Ocean.

=== California, 1847–1850 ===
Recommissioned on 9 February 1847, Southampton sailed south on 22 February, rounded Cape Horn, and proceeded up the Pacific coast of the Americas to the California coast. For the next two years, she supplied the ships which protected the newly won territory of the United States on the west coast. She returned to New York on 2 September 1850 and was decommissioned on the 15th.

=== Pacific Squadron, 1851–1852 ===
Recommissioned on the last day of 1850, Southampton departed New York on 2 February 1851 for another tour of duty with the Pacific Squadron, and returned to New York on 5 August 1852. She was decommissioned five days later to be fitted out for duty in the Far East.

=== Japan, 1852–1855 ===
The ship was recommissioned on 4 November 1852 and assigned to the East India Squadron and she sailed on 8 December for the Pacific. The following September, she joined Commodore Matthew C. Perry's squadron and was part of his expedition to Japan, entering Edo Bay during his second visit to Japan on 13 February 1854. Southampton returned to New York on 31 March 1855, was decommissioned on 6 April, and was sold later that year. She subsequently entered merchant service.
