= HMS Florizel =

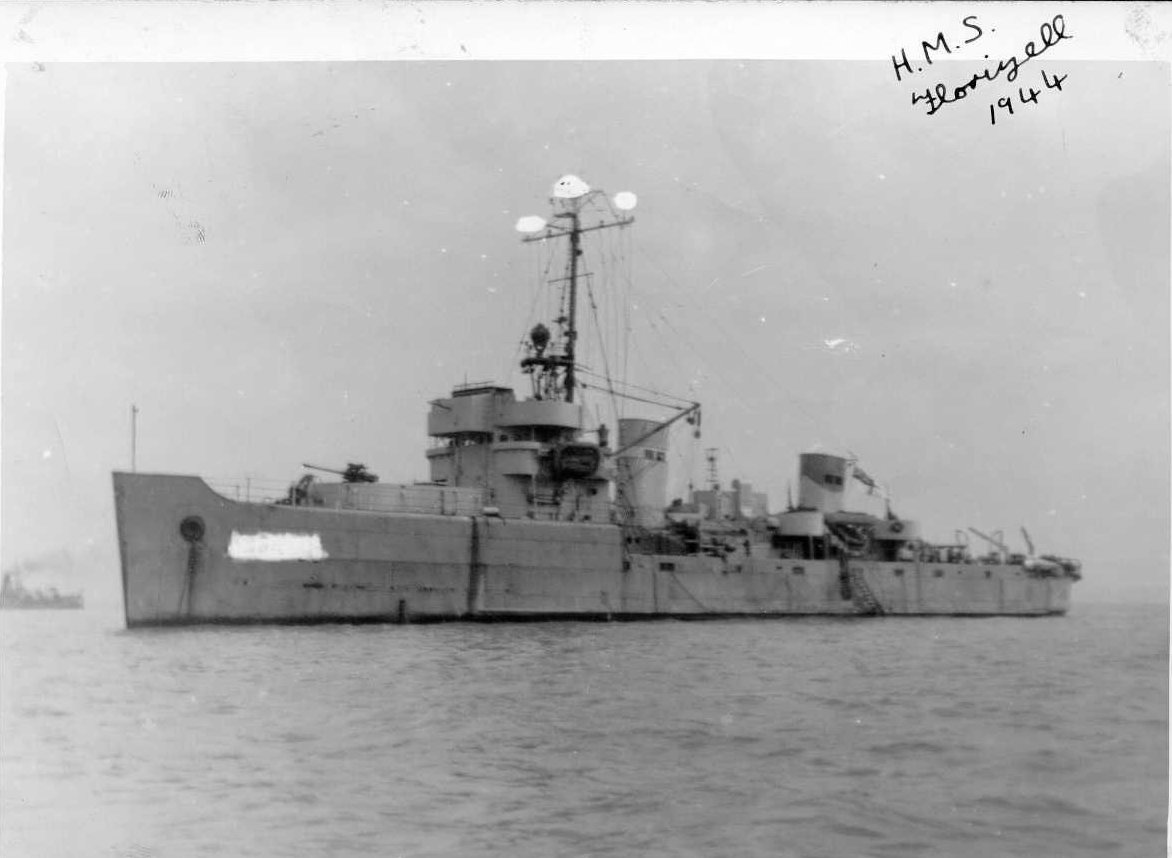
- HMS Florizel in 1944

History

United Kingdom
- Name: HMS Florizel
- Ordered: 24 March 1942
- Builder: Associated Shipbuilders
- Laid down: 27 January 1943
- Launched: 20 May 1943
- Commissioned: 14 April 1944
- Out of service: 14 December 1946 sold to Greece
- Renamed: 1947 merchant ship Aida; 1959 HNS Lasithi
- Identification: Pennant number J404
- Fate: Broken up at Messina 1967

General characteristics
- Class & type: Auk-class minesweeper
- Displacement: 945 tons
- Length: 184 ft 6 in (56.24 m)
- Beam: 33 ft (10 m)
- Draft: 9 ft 6 in (2.90 m)
- Propulsion: 2 × 1,710 shp (1,275 kW) Cooper Bessemer GSB-8 diesel engines
- Speed: 14.8 knots (27 km/h)
- Complement: 104
- Armament: 3 in (76 mm) dual-purpose gun mount; 2 × twin 40 mm gun mounts; 2 × 20 mm gun mounts; 2 × Depth charge tracks; 5 × depth charge projectors

HMS Florizel (J404), US pennant No. BAM-26, was an Auk-class minesweeper ordered by the US Navy to be supplied to the Royal Navy (RN) under Lend-lease. Florizel was built by Associated Ship Builders at Harbour Island, Seattle, Washington, United States and commissioned by the Royal Navy as Pennant No. J404. She was ordered 24 March 1942, laid down 27 January 1943, launched 20 May 1943 and commissioned 14 April 1944.

== 1944 Collision ==
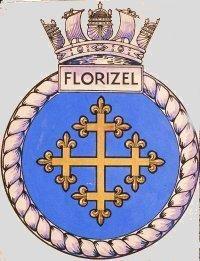
Patch of HMS Florizel

On 10 December 1944 HMS Charlestown collided with Florizel off Harwich, England. Due to the Charlestown's advanced age – the keel was laid more than 26 1/2 years earlier – and the pressing need for experienced crews on newer warships, the Royal Navy declined repairs. Florizel survived the encounter and returned to duty.

== Postwar history ==
- 14 December 1946 Sold to Greece
- 1947 Renamed Merchant Ship Aida
- 1953 Converted to a cargo ship
- 1959 Renamed Lasithi
- 1967 Broken up in Messina

== Other ships named Florizel ==
- SS Florizel a passenger ship commissioned in 1909 and sank off of St. John's, Newfoundland.
- SS Empire Florizel (169503) was a short lived UK transport ship launched 21 April 1943 and was bombed and sunk on 21 Jul 1943 off Augusta, Sicily.
