= Joel Abbot (naval officer) =

American naval officer (1793–1855)

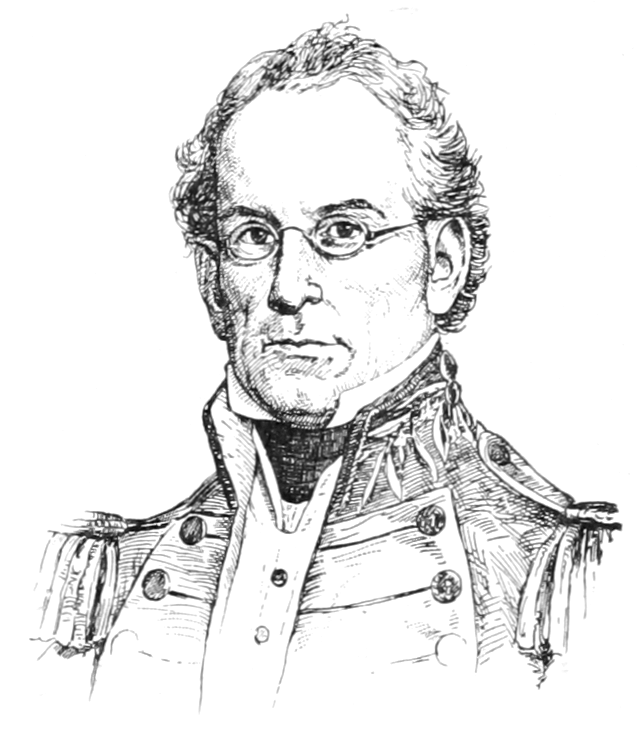
- Born: January 18, 1793; Westford, Massachusetts
- Died: December 14, 1855 (aged 62) Hong Kong
- Buried: Warren, Rhode Island
- Allegiance: United States
- Branch: United States Navy
- Service years: (1812-1855)
- Rank: Captain, Flag Officer, Commodore
- Commands: captured pirate ship Mariana (1818); Boston Navy Yard (1838); USS Decatur (1843); USS Macedonian (1852); Flag Officer, East India Squadron (1854)
- Conflicts: War of 1812

Joel Abbot (January 18, 1793 – December 14, 1855) was a U.S. naval officer who served notably in the War of 1812, and commanded a ship during Commodore Matthew Perry's 1853-1854 visit to Japan. Commodore Joel Abbot was Admiral Perry's second in command when they opened Japan in 1853–1854.

== Military career ==
Abbot was born in Westford, Massachusetts on January 18, 1793, son of Joel and Lydia (Cummings) Abbot. He entered the Navy at the age of 19 as midshipman at the beginning of the War of 1812.

He served first on the frigate USS President and next on Lake Champlain with Commodore Macdonough, who, when he asked Abbot if he were ready to die for his country received the reply "Certainly, sir; that is what I came into the service for." For his success in this dangerous exploit, and for his bravery in the engagement at Cumberland Head on 11 September 1814, the young officer received a sword of honor from Congress and was commissioned a lieutenant. In 1818, he was given charge of the captured pirate ship Mariana.

Abbot was promoted to commander in 1838, and the following year was given command of the Boston Navy Yard until 1842.

In 1843 he took command of the sloop-of-war Decatur in Commodore Perry's African Squadron.

On 3 October 1850, Abbot was promoted to captain. In 1852, he was made commander of the "Macedonian", when Commodore Perry was entrusted with power to select the officers to accompany him on his famous Japan expedition, he chose Abbot to command the sailing frigate USS Macedonian.

In 1854, he was appointed commodore of the East India Squadron. (At that time, commodore was the title of the commander of a squadron of ships, rather than a rank in the Navy.) He died in Hong Kong on December 14, 1855.

His remains were returned to the United States where he was buried in the Abbot family tomb in Warren, Rhode Island.

== Family life ==
Abbot married Mary Wood in January 1820. After Mary's untimely death, he married Laura Wheaton on November 29, 1825. He had 10 children by his two wives.

His son, Walter Abbot, served in the U.S. Navy during the American Civil War, rose to the rank of lieutenant commander and died on active duty in 1873. Another son, Charles Wheaton Abbot, Sr., served in the Navy from 1856 to 1891 and rose to the rank of Pay Director (equivalent to the rank of captain) and was later promoted to rear admiral on the retired list.

Abbot's grandson, Charles Wheaton Abbot Jr., was a career Army officer and rose to become the Adjutant General of Rhode Island with the rank of brigadier general. Both Walter Abbot and Charles Jr. were companions of the Military Order of the Loyal Legion of the United States.

== Namesakes ==
Two ships of the US Navy were named USS Abbot in his honor.

Joel Abbot Camp 21 of the Sons of Union Veterans of the Civil War was named after him when it was founded in 1907 in Warren, Rhode Island. The camp was relocated to Newport in the mid-1990s and was active until 2012.

== Dates of rank ==
- Midshipman - 18 June 1812
- Lieutenant - 1 April 1818
- Commander - 8 December 1838
- Captain - 3 October 1850
- Commodore - 6 September 1854

== See also ==
- Battle of Plattsburgh

Military offices
Preceded by Matthew C. Perry	Commander, East India Squadron; 6 September 1854–15 October 1855	Succeeded by James Armstrong
