= Siege of Fort Gaines =

Battle of the American Civil War

Coordinates: 30.24824°N 88.076870°W

- Part of the American Civil War
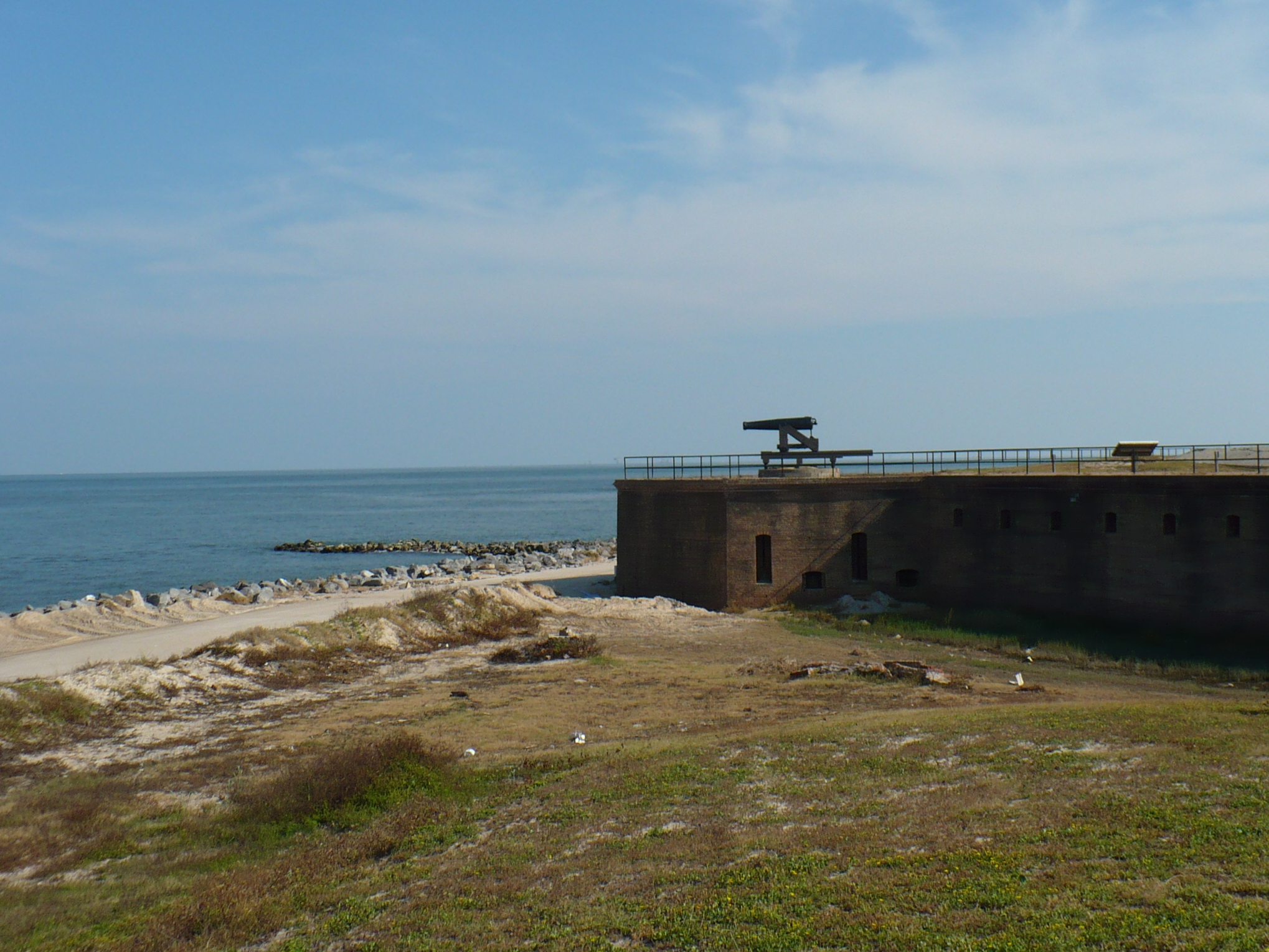
- Fort Gaines on Dauphin Island
Date	August 3–8, 1864
Location	Fort Gaines, Alabama
Result	Union victory

Belligerents
United States (Union)	Confederate States

Commanders and leaders
Gordon Granger	Charles D. Anderson

Strength
1,500	818

Casualties and losses
Unknown killed and wounded	3 KIA; 50 WIA; 765 surrendered

The siege of Fort Gaines, Alabama, occurred between August 3 and 8, 1864, during the American Civil War. It took place in the Mobile Bay area of Alabama as part of the larger battle of Mobile Bay, and resulted in the surrender of the fort and its defenders.

== Siege ==
Union forces under the command of Major General Gordon Granger landed on Dauphin Island, about 7 miles from Fort Gaines, on August 3, and moved against Fort Gaines guarding the western edge of Mobile Bay. Granger's force numbered about 1,500, while 818 troops under the command of Confederate Colonel Charles D. Anderson garrisoned the fort. Brigadier General Richard L. Page instructed Anderson not to surrender the fort. The fort was supposed to be able to withstand a six-month siege. However, on August 5 the Union fleet ran past Forts Gaines and Morgan, and defeated the Confederate fleet in the bay. The Union fleet had 199 guns to attack with, while the Confederates only held 26 within the walls of Fort Gaines. Anderson, believing he could not hold out against a combined attack by the Union army and navy, chose to surrender the fort on August 8.

== Aftermath ==
With the fall of Fort Gaines, Granger left a garrison at the fort and immediately moved against Fort Morgan to the east. After a two-week siege of Fort Morgan, Page surrendered his fort on August 23. The loss of these two forts gave control of Mobile Bay and ended the bay's use as a port for the Confederates.
