= C. D. Anderson =

C. D. Anderson may refer to

- Carl David Anderson (1905–1991), American physicist, Nobel laureate
- Charles D. Anderson (1827–1901), Confederate general
- Charles DeWitt Anderson (1827–1901), Confederate colonel
