= USS Talbot (FFG-4) =

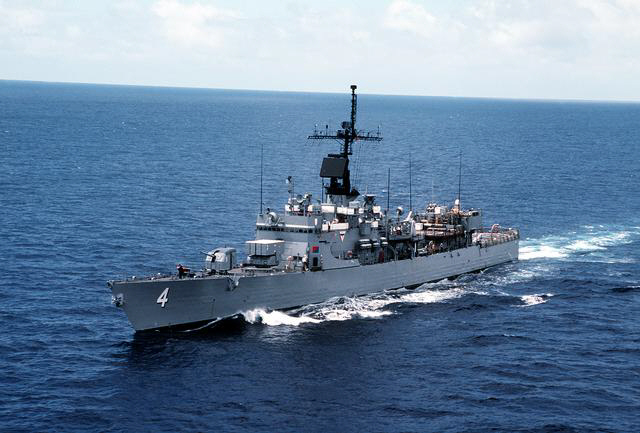

History

United States
- Namesake: Silas Talbot
- Ordered: 24 May 1963
- Builder: Bath Iron Works
- Laid down: 4 May 1964
- Launched: 6 January 1966
- Acquired: 14 April 1967
- Commissioned: 22 April 1967
- Decommissioned: 30 September 1988
- Stricken: 29 November 1993
- Identification: Pennant number 4
- Fate: Sold for scrap on 9 March 1994
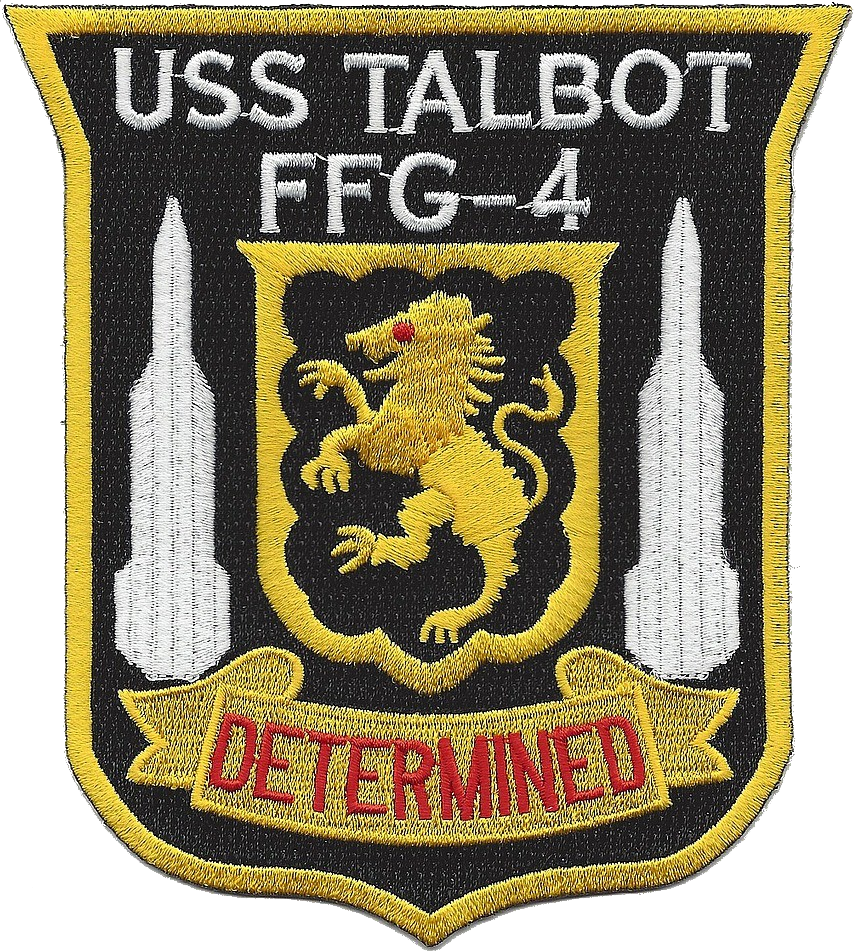
- Badge

History

Pakistan
- Name: PNS Hunain
- Commissioned: April 1989
- Decommissioned: 1993
- Identification: Pennant number D164
- Fate: Returned to United States

General characteristics
- Class & type: Brooke-class frigate
- Displacement: 3,426 tons full
- Length: 414 feet
- Beam: 44 feet
- Draft: 14 feet 6 inches
- Propulsion: 2 pressure fired boilers of German design, 1 General Electric geared turbine, 35,000 shp, 1 shaft
- Speed: 27.2 knots (50 km/h)
- Range: 4,000 nautical miles (7,000 km)
- Complement: 14 officers, 214 crew
- Sensors & processing systems: AN/SPS-52 3D air search radar; AN/SPS-10 surface search radar; AN/SPG-51 missile fire control radar; AN/SQS-26 bow mounted sonar
- Electronic warfare & decoys: AN/SLQ-32
- Armament: 1 × 5"/38 caliber gun; 1 × Mk 22 RIM-24 Tartar/RIM-66 Standard missile launcher (16 missiles); 1 × 8 cell ASROC launcher; 2 × 3 12.75 in (324 mm) Mk 32 torpedo tubes, Mk 46 torpedoes; 2 × MK 37 torpedo tubes (fixed, stern, removed later)
- Aircraft carried: SH-2 Seasprite

The USS Talbot (FFG-4) was the fourth Brooke-class frigate guided missile frigate and laid down on 4 May 1964 at Bath, Maine, by the Bath Iron Works Corp.; launched on 6 January 1966; sponsored by Miss Frances K. Talbot; and commissioned on 22 April 1967. The ship was named for U.S. Navy Captain Silas Talbot.

== Operational history ==
On 8 July, the new guided-missile escort ship departed Hampton Roads, Virginia, for Puerto Rico for shakedown and missile system trials. Talbot next headed north and arrived at her home port, Newport, Rhode Island, on 16 September. The ship conducted special operations off the Virginia Capes from 16 October to 18 November and then spent most of her time until the spring of 1968 undergoing post-shakedown availability. Following firing exercises at the Atlantic Fleet weapons range and antisubmarine operations late in April, the destroyer escort participated in the search for missing nuclear submarine USS Scorpion (SSN-589) in May. She devoted the rest of the year to operations along the Atlantic coast and in the Caribbean.

=== Mediterranean Sea ===
On 31 January 1969, Talbot departed Newport for the Mediterranean and was deployed with the 6th Fleet until she returned on 11 July. After overhaul at the Boston Naval Shipyard was completed on 1 April 1970, Talbot conducted local operations before returning to the missile range off Puerto Rico in May for weapons tests, followed by refresher training and four months at Newport. On 28 October 1970, she headed for the Mediterranean and her second tour with the 6th Fleet. The deployment ended at Newport on 2 May 1971, and she devoted the remainder of the year to east coast operations.

=== South American tour ===
Talbot spent the first part of 1972 conducting tests of the MK-48 torpedo in the Bahamas and off the New England coast. She stood out of Newport on 21 July and proceeded to Naval Station Roosevelt Roads, Puerto Rico, accompanied by USS Farragut (DLG-6) and USS Forrest Sherman (DD-931). There, USS Remora (SS-487) joined the group on the 26th, and they began combined operations with ships from seven South American navies while circumnavigating South America. Talbot made calls in Venezuela, Brazil, Uruguay, Argentina, Chile, Peru, the Panama Canal Zone, and Colombia before returning to Newport on 3 December 1972. She entered the Boston Naval Shipyard on 15 February 1973 for an overhaul that lasted until 14 December.

=== Western Atlantic ===
On 5 January 1974, Talbot departed Newport and proceeded to her new home port, Norfolk, Virginia. From 13 February to 29 April, the ship was deployed on training exercises off Jacksonville, Florida; Guantanamo Bay, Cuba; and Vieques, Puerto Rico. After a cruise to Newport in May, she entered the Norfolk Naval Shipyard on 17 June for the installation of prototypes of the Oto Melara Mk 75 rapid-fire 76 mm gun mount and the Mk 92 fire-control system, intended for use in the new USS Oliver Hazard Perry (FFG-7) and USS Pegasus (PHM-1) classes. She stood out of Hampton Roads on 21 October and, from 12 November through 19 December 1974, tested the new systems at the Atlantic Fleet Weapons Range, Culebra, Puerto Rico.

Talbot continued her evaluation work into 1975, alternating three periods of test operations at Culebra with a tender availability alongside USS Puget Sound (AD-38) at Norfolk, local operations in the Virginia capes area, and fleet tactical exercises in the western Atlantic. Her test mission completed, Talbot returned to Norfolk on 22 June. After local operations and inspections, she entered the Norfolk Naval Shipyard on 15 September for a three-month overhaul in which her experimental fire-control system and 76 mm gun were removed and replaced by her normal 5 inch, 38-caliber gun and fire-control system.

=== Mediterranean and Persian Gulf ===
Upon completing overhaul and refresher training in the spring of 1976, Talbot departed Norfolk on 22 June for a Mediterranean deployment. While steaming in the Mediterranean, the Talbot experienced a ruptured fuel tank while refueling under-way and was forced to repair, In La Maddalena, Sardinia.The six-month operation included participation in NATO exercises interspersed with port visits and concluded with the ship's return to Norfolk on 10 January 1977. Following post-deployment leave and upkeep, Talbot conducted exercises off the east coast until she entered the Philadelphia Naval Shipyard for overhaul on 9 June. Completing overhaul on 7 April 1978, Talbot spent the balance of the year in refresher training and participating in Fleet exercises off the east coast and in the Caribbean. On 6 December, she departed the United States for deployment with the Middle East Force in response to the crisis surrounding the deposition of the Shah of Iran. The close of 1978 found Talbot en route to the Persian Gulf.

During the 76 Med cruise Talbot was assigned a LAMPS (Light Airborne Multi-Purpose System) Helicopter Detachment (Det-6) from US Navy squadron HSL-34 (Helicopter Squadron Light-34), Naval Air Station Norfolk, VA. Det-6 Commanding Officer was LCDR Jon Cook. The helicopter utilized was the KAMAN SH-2F. This was the first LAMPS Det that Talbot had on board. It was also the first time the US Navy assigned a LAMPS DET to an FFG to test operational readiness on a small flight deck. The entire operation was deemed a success, with over sixty day/ night time landings safely accomplished. Later, Talbot was assigned another LAMPS DET from HSL-32.

== Fate ==
Talbot was leased to Pakistan in April 1989 and renamed to PNS Hunain (D-164). The ship was returned to the United States at Singapore and stricken 29 November 1993. Talbot was soon sold for scrap on 29 March 1994 to Trusha Investments Ltd. for $601,650.
