= Ebenezer Farrand =

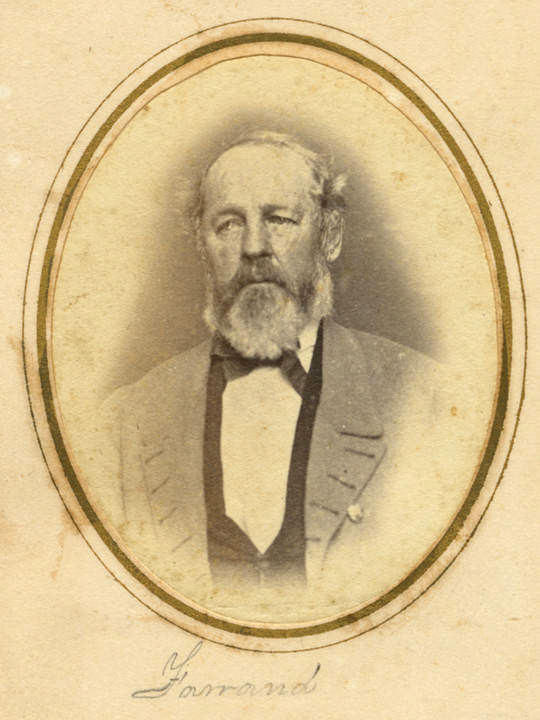
- Born: 1803; New York City, United States
- Died: March 17, 1873 (aged 69–70); Attalla, Alabama, United States
- Military career
- Branch: United States Navy; Confederate States Navy
- Service years: 1823–1865
- Rank: Commodore
- Nickname: Eben
- Commands: USS Ariel; USS Falmouth
- Conflicts: Paraguay expedition; American Civil War; Peninsula campaign; Battle of Drewry's Bluff; Operations in Mobile Bay; Battle of Mobile Bay

Ebenezer Farrand (1803 – March 17, 1873) was an American Commodore who served in the Confederate States Navy and was notable for his service at the Battle of Drewry's Bluff as well as his ship construction at Selma, Alabama.

== Biography ==
=== Early military career ===
Ebenezer Farrand was born in 1803 in New York City. He later moved to New Jersey and entered service of the United States Navy on March 4, 1823, as a midshipman's warrant. He was promoted to midshipman in 1829 and initially commanded the newly constructed USS Ariel in 1831 before commanding the USS Falmouth in 1851. Due to his naval actions, he was promoted to commander on July 10, 1854.

=== American Civil War ===
Despite being a Northerner, Farrand sympathized with the Southern states and resigned from the United States Navy on January 21, 1861, as he was stationed at the Warrenton Naval Yard in Pensacola, Florida as part of his first task as a Confederate. He was then promoted to Commander on June 6, 1861, and was sent to negotiate in New Orleans for the construction of several gunboats. He was made Chief of Light House Bureau, replacing Raphael Semmes as he was commanding the CSS Sumter. In 1862, he was to a special service regarding ship construction before being sent to Savannah, Georgia. He briefly served in Rockett's Yard at the James River, a few miles south of Richmond, Virginia before Union forces were beginning to threaten the Confederate capital. As a response, Farrand organized Confederate Army and Navy personnel at Drewry's Bluff and ordered guns from nearby ships as well as the sinking of the CSS Jamestown to obstruct the James River. When the Union forces under Admiral John Rodgers arrived with the USS Galena but were defeated at the Battle of Drewry's Bluff. For his victory at Drewry's Bluff, he received a direct thanking from the Confederate Congress itself. Farrand didn't stay at Drewry's Bluff for long as his command was relinquished to Sydney Smith Lee and took charge of shipbuilding at Selma, Alabama. While based in Selma, Farrand oversaw the construction of Fort Stonewall on the Alabama River and Fort Sidney Johnston on the Tombigbee River. As a result of his direct contributions, he helped with the completion of CSS Tuscaloosa, CSS Huntsville and the CSS Tennessee.

On January 7, 1864, he was promoted to captain and followed the launched ironclads to Mobile, Alabama but shortly after, assumed command of the Confederate naval forces at the Battle of Mobile Bay after Admiral Franklin Buchanan was wounded as the few Confederate ships left supported the land forces against the Union Navy but generally seemed disinterested in the battle as he refused to take orders due his rivalry with Dabney H. Maury. Following the Union capture of Mobile, Rear Admiral Henry K. Thatcher blocked the mouth of the Tombigbee River and Farrand surrendered as a result of this on May 8, 1865. He was paroled of charges of treason two days later at Nanna Hubba Bluff.

=== Postwar life ===
Farrand would spend his civilian life as an insurance representative at Montgomery, Alabama as well as working as a railroad operator in Attalla, Alabama before dying on 17 March 1873 and was buried at the city cemetery.
