= USS Richard L. Page =

1966 Brooke-class frigate

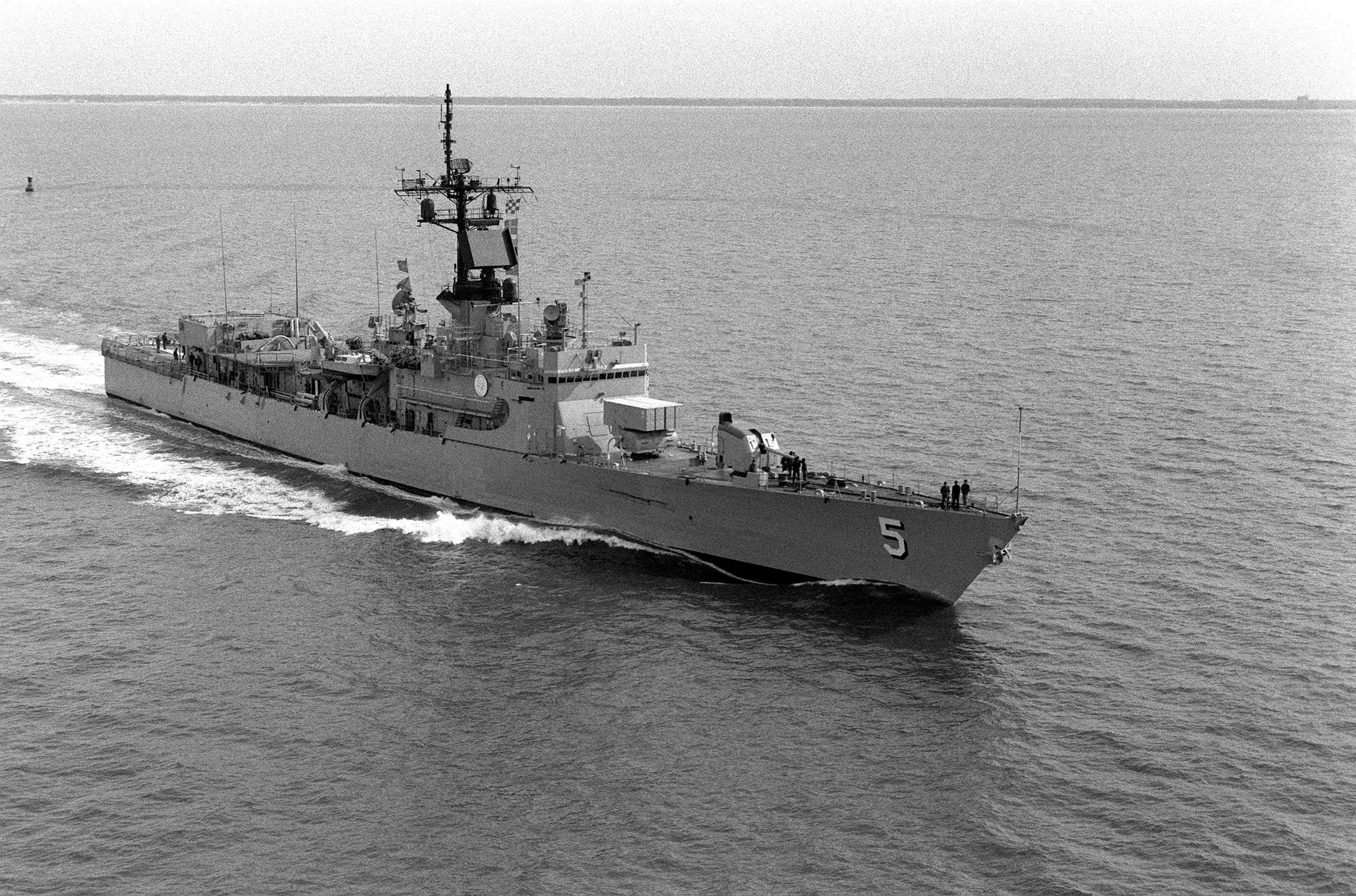
- USS RICHARD L PAGE (FFG 5)

History

United States
- Namesake: Richard L. Page
- Ordered: 24 May 1963
- Builder: Bath Iron Works
- Laid down: 4 January 1965
- Launched: 4 April 1966
- Acquired: 27 July 1967
- Commissioned: 5 August 1967
- Decommissioned: 30 September 1988
- Stricken: 12 January 1994
- Fate: Disposed of by Navy title transfer to the Maritime Administration, 28 March 1994

History

Pakistan
- Name: Tabuk
- Acquired: 1989
- Commissioned: 31 March 1989
- Decommissioned: March 1994
- Fate: Returned to United States

General characteristics
- Class & type: Brooke class frigate
- Displacement: 3,426 tons full
- Length: 414 ft (126 m)
- Beam: 44 ft (13 m)
- Draft: 14 ft 6 in (4.42 m)
- Propulsion: 2 Foster-Wheeler boilers, 1 General Electric geared turbine
- Speed: 27.2 knots
- Range: 4,000 nautical miles
- Complement: 14 officers, 214 crew
- Sensors & processing systems: AN/SPS-52 3D air search radar; AN/SPS-10 surface search radar; AN/SPG-51 missile fire control radar; AN/SQS-26 bow mounted sonar
- Electronic warfare & decoys: AN/SLQ-32; T-Mk 6 Fanfare towed acoustic torpedo decoy
- Armament: 1 × 5"/38 caliber gun; 1 × Mk 22 RIM-24 Tartar/RIM-66 Standard missile launcher (16 missiles); 1 × 8 cell ASROC launcher; 2 × 3 12.75 in (324mm) Mk 32 torpedo tubes, Mk 46 torpedoes; 2 × MK 37 torpedo tubes (fixed, stern, removed later)
- Aircraft carried: SH-2 Seasprite

USS Richard L. Page (FFG-5) was a Brooke class frigate in the United States Navy.

Richard L. Page was laid down on 4 January 1965 by the Bath Iron Works, Bath, Maine. She was launched on 4 April 1966, sponsored by Miss Edmonia Lee Whittle and Mrs. Nannie Page Trinker, granddaughters of the ship's namesake, Brigadier General Richard L. Page, and commissioned as a guided missile destroyer escort at Boston, Massachusetts on 5 August 1967 with the hull number DEG-5.

== Operational history ==
In mid-October 1967, Richard L. Page moved from Boston to her homeport of Naval Station Newport, Rhode Island, then sailed south for shakedown exercises in the Caribbean. On 21 December 1967, she returned to Newport and, after post-shakedown availability, began operations with Escort Squadron SIX (CORTRON 6). Into 1968, she operated in the western Atlantic and, in the fall, she deployed to the Mediterranean for duty with the 6th Fleet. On that duty until 10 February 1969, she returned to Newport on 18 February and in March 1969 resumed operations with the 2nd Fleet. On 1 July 1969, she relieved USS Brumby (DE-1044) as flagship of Destroyer Division ONE TWO(DESRON 12), then conducted exercises in the Caribbean.

Richard L. Page spent all of 1971 and the first eight months of 1972 in port at Newport and in operations along the east coast of the United States and in the Caribbean. In mid-August 1972, she steamed out of Newport, bound for an extended deployment with the Sixth Fleet in the Mediterranean.

From 1973 to 1975, she was forward deployed to Athens, Greece, and on 30 June 1975 she was reclassified as a guided missile frigate with the new hull number of FFG-5. Returning from Europe, Richard L. Page underwent a year-long modernization overhaul, returning to the Atlantic Fleet and a new homeport of Naval Station Norfolk, Virginia in 1976. Over the next four years, she repeatedly deployed to the Mediterranean, Middle East, the eastern coast of Africa, and Northern Europe, interspersed with brief periods in her stateside homeport of Norfolk.

During this same four-year period, in 1979, Richard L. Page was the recipient of both the Battle Efficiency "E" that year from Commander, Naval Surface Force Atlantic, designating her as the best guided missile frigate among all guided missile frigates in the U.S. Atlantic Fleet, and the Battenberg Cup, designating her as the surface warship with the highest operational excellence of any warship in the entire U.S. Atlantic Fleet.

In early 1980, she temporarily relocated to Philadelphia Naval Shipyard where she received various sonar and electronic warfare system upgrades before returning to the Fleet in August 1980. She then completed independent operations in the Caribbean and Western Atlantic, and following completion of Refresher Training (REFTRA) at Naval Station Guantanamo Bay, Cuba, returned to Norfolk to participate in Exercise SOLID SHIELD 81. During the rest of 1981, she operated as a unit of Standing Naval Force Atlantic.

Deploying in late 1983, she joined the USS John F. Kennedy (CV-67) carrier battle group, deploying to both the Mediterranean, where she supported both the U.S. 6th Fleet and multinational peacekeeping forces in Lebanon, and to the North Atlantic and Norway as part of Cold War operations as a deterrent force to the Red Banner Northern Fleet of the Soviet Navy. Following her return to Norfolk in 1984, Richard L. Page underwent another yard period overhaul at Bath Iron Works in Maine before returning to the Fleet from 1986. In 1987, with the acquisition of the newer Oliver Hazard Perry class guided missile frigates nearly complete, a decision was made to retire the entire Brooke class of frigates from the U.S. Navy in 1988 and 1989 and earmark them for transfer to a foreign navy.

== Fate ==
Richard L. Page remained in U.S. naval service until decommissioned on 30 September 1988. Earlier, in 1982, the Reagan administration approved a US$3.2 billion military and economic aid package to Pakistan. As part of that package, Pakistan acquired Richard L. Page on a five-year lease in 1989. On 31 March 1989, she was leased to Pakistan, recommissioned in the Pakistani Navy and renamed PNS Tabuk (D-163).

However, as a result of the Soviet troop withdrawal from Afghanistan in February 1989, President George H. W. Bush was advised a few months later to no longer certify that Pakistan was not involved in the development of nuclear weapons in accordance with the Pressler Amendment, which banned most economic and military assistance to Pakistan unless the President certified on an annual basis that "Pakistan does not possess a nuclear explosive device and that the proposed United States assistance program will reduce significantly the risk that Pakistan will possess a nuclear explosive device." The Pressler Amendment was subsequently invoked on 1 October 1990. The lease of the ship expired in March 1994 and she was returned to United States control that same month.

As a result, the ship was struck from the Navy Vessel Register on 12 January 1994 and transferred to the Maritime Administration (MARAD) for disposal on 28 March 1994. On 29 March 1994, the ex-Richard L. Page was returned to the U.S. Navy, acting as executive agent for the MARAD, at Singapore and sold to Trusha Investments Pte. Ltd. c/o Jacques Pierot, Jr. & Sons Inc., New York City, N.Y. for $626,850.00 for eventual scrapping.

== Awards ==
During her service with the U.S. Navy, Richard L. Page was awarded the Navy Unit Commendation, the Meritorious Unit Commendation with 1 bronze star (2 awards), the Navy E Ribbon (2 awards), the Navy Expeditionary Medal, the National Defense Service Medal, the Armed Forces Expeditionary Medal and the Navy Sea Service Deployment Ribbon.

The ship and crew was also the 1979 recipient of the Battenberg Cup.
