= Fort Stonewall =

United States historic site in Alabama

- Near Gainestown, Alabama in United States
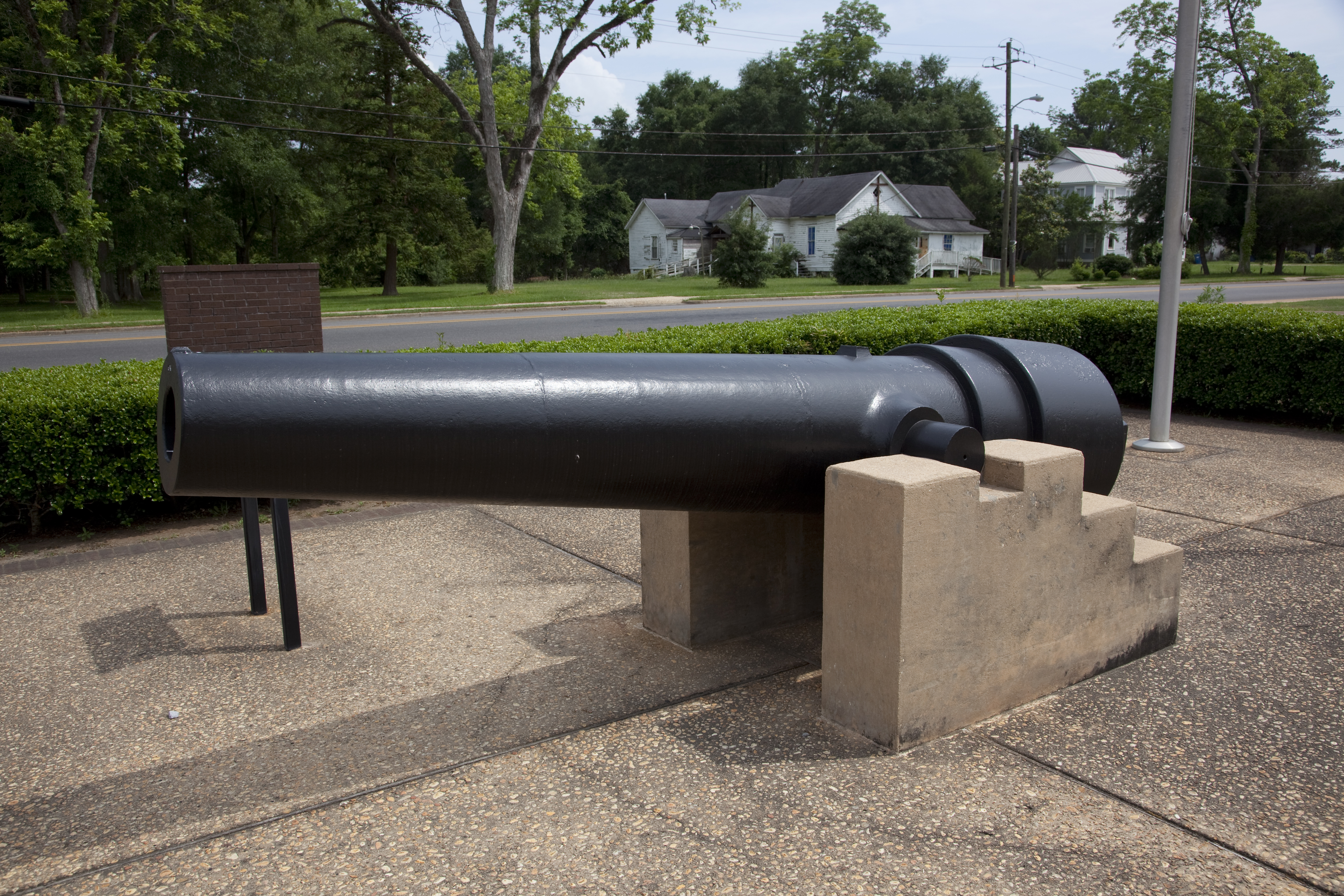
- Brooke rifle S-96 used at Fort Sidney Johnston, similar to the Brooke rifles used at Fort Stonewall. This piece is displayed in front of the Jackson, Alabama, City Hall.

Site information
- Type: Earthwork and battery
- Owner: Private
- Controlled by: Private
- Open to the public: No

Location
- Coordinates: 31°21′32″N 87°46′05″W

Site history
- Built: 1862
- Built by: Confederate States of America, Alabama
- In use: 1862-1865
- Demolished: 1865
- Battles/wars: American Civil War

Fort Stonewall was a fort built by the state of Alabama in 1862 in present-day Clarke County, Alabama, during the American Civil War. Fort Stonewall was constructed on the Alabama River by enslaved Africans to protect the interior of Alabama in the event that Mobile was captured by Union forces. Additional forts were concurrently constructed to defend against Union advances up the Tombigbee River and to protect nearby salt works. The fort never saw any military action and was destroyed at the close of the American Civil War. Earthworks and a cannon are all that exist at the site today, which is located on private property.

== Background ==
After the capture of New Orleans in 1862, Mobile became the last major port in the eastern Gulf of Mexico. Mobile subsequently became the center of blockade running on the Gulf of Mexico, receiving imports from the Caribbean and becoming an important lifeline to the Confederate economy. The Confederate government began strengthening land defenses to protect the city from land attack and strengthened Fort Morgan and Fort Gaines.

After the fall of New Orleans, some citizens of Mobile fled to the interior of Alabama due to fear the United States would soon assault Mobile. Refugees from Mississippi also settled near Choctaw Bluff on the Alabama River in Clarke County. In response to these fears, the state of Alabama and the Confederate government began constructing forts to protect the interior of Alabama from federal invasion. A fort would be built at Choctaw Bluff to prevent any advancement up the Alabama River, which provided access to the Selma Naval Ordnance Works and Montgomery. Other forts were constructed along the Tombigbee River at Oven Bluff and the site of Fort Carney. These forts would not only prevent advancement up the Tombigbee into Alabama and Mississippi, but would provide defense for the saltworks in Clarke County. The salt springs in Clarke County have been used since the early Mississippian period and became important to the Confederacy due to the salt shortage caused by the Union blockade. In response, the state of Alabama constructed saltworks that included a hospital, cemetery, worker housing, and stores.

== History ==
=== Construction ===
In the fall of 1862, Governor John Gill Shorter ordered the construction of forts at Choctaw, Oven and Carney bluffs. The Choctaw Bluff fort was constructed 91 feet (28 m) above the Alabama River. The location was chosen in a bend so as to expose a boat to artillery fire while approaching, passing, and leaving sight of the fort. Captain Ebenezer Farrand of the Confederate States Navy initially oversaw construction of the forts, then, in the spring of 1863, the engineer office at Mobile was given command of the forts. Lieutenant Colonel Victor von Scheliha, a native of Prussia who served as the chief engineer of the Department of the Gulf, and was responsible for a string of defenses around Mobile, was assigned as chief engineer over the forts by Brigadier General Danville Leadbetter on January 31, 1863. After von Scheliha, Colonel James W. Robertson was given command of construction. On June 17, 1863, Major General Dabney H. Maury ordered the fort at Choctaw Bluff to be named Fort Stonewall in honor of Stonewall Jackson and the fort at Oven Bluff to be named Fort Sidney Johnston in honor of Albert Sidney Johnston.

Von Scheliha considered Fort Stonewall to be a model of river defense. In 1868, he described the fort's design as:

Two gulleys, running at nearly right angles to the river, facilitated the mounting of two guns five feet above high-water mark. All other guns were placed in gun-chambers sunk into the natural ground, and lying in different vertical and horizontal planes, thus forming terraces en échelon. The position was to be protected in the rear by a strong line in bastions. From the parade of the work well-covered communications led into the several gun-chambers, which all stood in communication with each other by a gallery 4 feet wide and 6 feet high. From these galleries a short branch led to the service-magazines established for every gun; the main magazine was built in one of the many gulleys within the enceinte of the place. A heavy parapet, giving perfect protection to riflemen aiming at the portholes of the enemy's vessels, extended from gun-chamber to gun-chamber, serving at the same time as a traverse against any enfilading fire. Provisions were stored in bomb-proof storehouses; there were bomb-proof surgeon-rooms, kitchens, and wells; heavy traverses against enfilading fire or fire en reverse had been erected wherever deemed necessary.

Fort Sidney Johnston was located eight miles (13 km) due west of Fort Stonewall. A military road with a centrally located military camp connected the forts. In addition to the forts themselves, obstructions were placed in the Tombigbee River near Fort Sidney Johnston. Obstructions were unable to be placed in the Alabama River near Fort Stonewall, and as a result, Fort Stonewall was constructed larger than Fort Sidney Johnston.

By the fall of 1863, construction on both forts was completed. The total cost of construction of Fort Stonewall was approximately 10,000 Confederate States dollars.

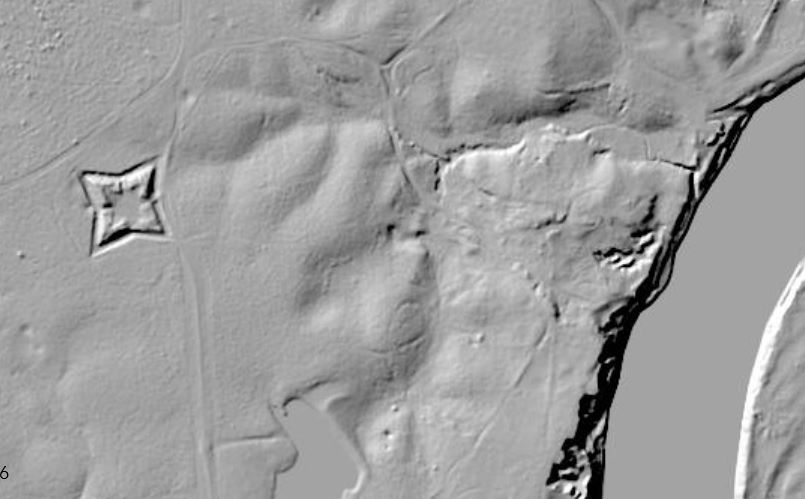
2018 LiDAR hillshade map showing Fort Stonewall's enceinte on the left and the Alabama River on the right

==== Slave labor ====
Forts Stonewall and Sidney Johnston were built by enslaved African-Americans who were impressed into service by the state of Alabama. Slaves were impressed from the central Alabama counties of Marengo, Greene, Tuscaloosa, Perry, Sumter, Dallas, Clarke, Choctaw, and Lowndes and worked under Confederate government supervision. The slave owners in these counties were required to furnish slaves, rations for twenty days, shovels, and axes. The state supplied transportation of these slaves from their home counties to the fort sites via steamboat. After their terms of service were expired, slaves were returned to their slave owners and replaced with new slaves. Governor Shorter wrote letters to slave owners imploring their patriotism in a request for slaves to work longer than their required terms.

The slaves that constructed forts Stonewall and Sidney Johnston had physicians who ensured they were able to complete their work and there were private citizens who applied to fill these positions.

=== Military use ===
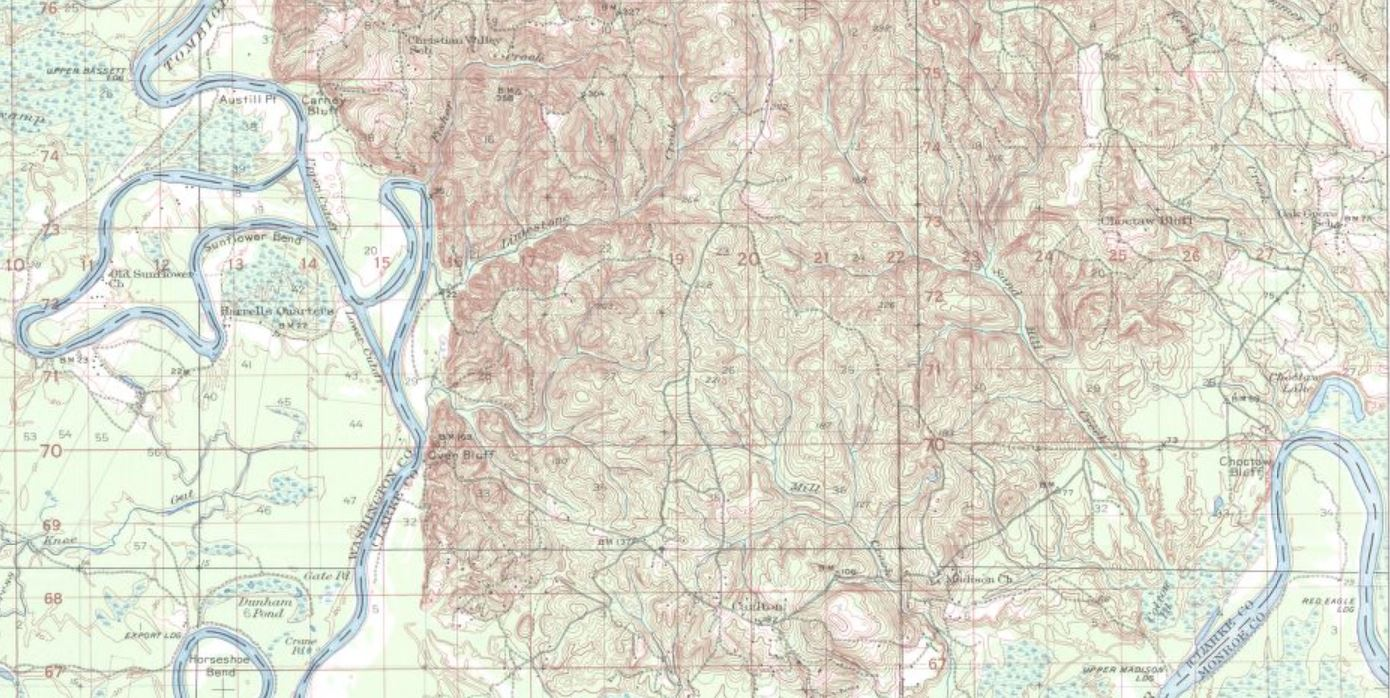
1945 US Department of Defense map showing Choctaw Bluff (center right), Oven Bluff (center left), and Carney Bluff (upper left)

While Fort Stonewall was under construction, the Confederate military began garrisoning it with troops. The 21st Alabama Infantry Volunteers, 1st Battalion, companies A, B, C, and F, under the command of Colonel Charles DeWitt Anderson, were assigned to forts Stonewall and Sidney Johnston from Fort Morgan on October 6, 1862. These companies were intermittently transferred between the two forts and defenses in Mobile until June 1863. By December 20, 1862, a total of 244 soldiers were garrisoned at forts Stonewall and Sidney Johnston, with the companies of the 21st Infantry providing heavy artillery for the forts. Lieutenant Colonel James M. Williams took command of Fort Stonewall from May 6–23, 1863. From May 23 – June 6, Williams was given command of Fort Sidney Johnston. While Williams was in command of both forts, his wife lived near Fort Sidney Johnston prior to her moving back to Mobile. On July 22, 1863, operations at both forts were suspended and their soldiers were reassigned to the defenses of Mobile. The Confederate military suspended operations at the forts due to a variety of factors, including the Union Army's advance from Jackson, Mississippi, the construction of stronger fortifications at the upper reaches of Mobile Bay that would slow any Union advancement, and the fact that the forts' sites were considered unhealthy in hot weather. In 1864, the artillery was removed from Fort Stonewall and transferred to Mobile. After the Battle of Mobile Bay, forts Stonewall and Sidney Johnston were once again garrisoned with troops. Stanford's Company, Mississippi Light Artillery, was transferred to Fort Stonewall after the Battle of Nashville and was stationed there until surrendering under Lieutenant General Richard Taylor, at Citronelle, at the end of the American Civil War.

Forts Stonewall and Sidney Johnston were not only vital to protecting the interior of Alabama from Union advancement, but they also provided protection to the salt works in Clarke County and boat works at Oven Bluff (other sources state the boat works were at McIntosh Bluff in Washington County). The government of Clarke County and the state of Alabama both operated salt works in Clarke County that employed over 1,000 workers. A number of the military guards from the salt works also served at Fort Stonewall. The salt produced at these salt works was shipped throughout Alabama, Georgia, and Mississippi. Boat works were constructed on the Tombigbee River after the capture of New Orleans due to the thought Mobile would need additional defenses for a possible attack. A sawmill, grist mill, and blacksmith shop were built to support the boat works at Oven Bluff. At least four boats (known as "Bigbee boats"), were constructed. Two of these boats were 160 feet (49 m) long and were partially completed before being sent to Mobile. A third, 180-foot-long (55 m) boat was under construction when it was burned to prevent capture by Union forces in April 1865. An additional boat and the boat works were destroyed by the Confederate government in the face of Union military advances.

Fort Stonewall never saw military action, but after the Battle of Spanish Fort a number of Confederate gunboats attempted to flee up Alabama River to the safety of Fort Stonewall. These boats never completed their journey and were surrendered at Nannahubba Island, near the source of the Mobile River. Fort Stonewall was garrisoned until Mobile fell to Union forces. On April 14, 1865, Fort Stonewall's magazines were exploded by order of its commanding officer, Colonel William R. Miles. The following day, Miles ordered the magazine at Fort Sidney Johnston (which he also commanded), to be exploded prior to withdrawing his forces to Demopolis. Major General Frederick Steele reported the two Brooke rifles from Fort Stonewall were spiked prior to the Confederate forces' retreat. The guns were "of superior quality" and were left by Federal forces with plans to move them for future use.

=== Postwar ===
Additional view of the Brooke rifle from Fort Sidney Johnston on display in Jackson, Alabama

After the end of the American Civil War, the site of Fort Stonewall reverted to private property. In 1923, George C. Colton, who owned the land that included Fort Stonewall, offered Brooke rifles from the sites of Fort Stonewall and Fort Sidney Johnston to the Alabama government. These rifles were brought from their locations by dredge boat. En route, the rifle from Fort Sidney Johnston was acquired by the city of Jackson, Alabama. The rifle was mounted in front of the city hall, where it remains today. A historical marker indicates the rifle, serial number S-96, was constructed at the Selma Naval Ordnance Works and includes the initials of Commander Catesby ap Roger Jones.

One of the Brooke rifle from Fort Stonewall (serial number S-89), was transported to Montgomery. As late as 1937, the rifle was lying in mud on the edge of the Alabama River at the end of Commerce Street. S-89 was eventually displayed at the entrance of Maxwell Field, and in 1956 was moved to Fort Morgan State Historic Park. As of 2026, S-89 is displayed outside the fort.

An additional rifle from Fort Stonewall, S-95, was in front of a private home near the site of the fort as of 1987.

The site of Fort Stonewall is currently located on private property and is inaccessible to the public.

== Sources ==
- Bergeron, Arthur W. Jr. (2000). Confederate Mobile. Baton Rouge, Louisiana: LSU Press. ISBN 9780807164792.
- Dumas, Ashley A. (2015). Alexianu, Marius; Curcă, Roxana-Gabriela; Weller, Olivier; Dumas, Ashley A. (eds.). "Recent Archaeology of Salt in Southeastern North America". Mirrors of Salt: Proceedings of the First International Congress on the Anthropology of Salt. doi:10.32028/9781784914561. ISBN 9781784914561.
- Green, Arthur E. (2012). Mobile Confederates from Shiloh to Spanish Fort: The Story of the 21st Alabama Infantry Volunteers. Westminster, Maryland: Heritage Books. ISBN 9780788453762.
- Lamar, May; Donnell, Rich (1987). Hunting: The Southern Tradition. Dallas, Texas: Taylor Publishing Company. ISBN 0-87833-536-6.
- Stephenson, John G. (2004). "First Thunder at Shiloh". The Civil War Reader, 1862. New York, New York: iBooks. ISBN 9780743479301.
- U.S. War Department (1897). Operations in Kentucky, Southwest Virginia, Tennessee, Northern and Central Georgia, Mississippi, Alabama, and West Florida. March 16 to June 30, 1865., Part II - Union and Confederate Correspondence, etc. The War of the Rebellion: A Compilation of the Official Records of the Union and Confederate Armies. Vol. XLIX–II. Washington, DC: U.S. Government Printing Office. hdl:2027/mdp.49015002001098. OCLC 857196196.
- von Scheliha, Viktor Ernst Karl Randolph (1868). A treatise on coast-defence: based on the experience gained by officers of the Corps of Engineers of the Army of the Confederate States, and compiled from official reports of officers of the Navy of the United States, made during the late North American War from 1861 to 1865. London: E. and F. N. Spon.
- Weaver, David C. (1983). Cultural Resources Reconnaissance Study of the Black Warrior-Tombigbee System Corridor, Alabama (PDF) (Technical report). Mobile, Alabama: U.S. Army Corps of Engineers, Mobile District. "Volume III, History, Settlement Patterns and Processes, 1500-1945"
- Williams, James M. (1981). Folmar, John Kent (ed.). From That Terrible Field: Civil War Letters of James M. Williams, Twenty-first Alabama Infantry Volunteers. Tuscaloosa, Alabama: University of Alabama Press. ISBN 0-8173-0068-6.
