= Brooke-class frigate =

US Navy frigate class

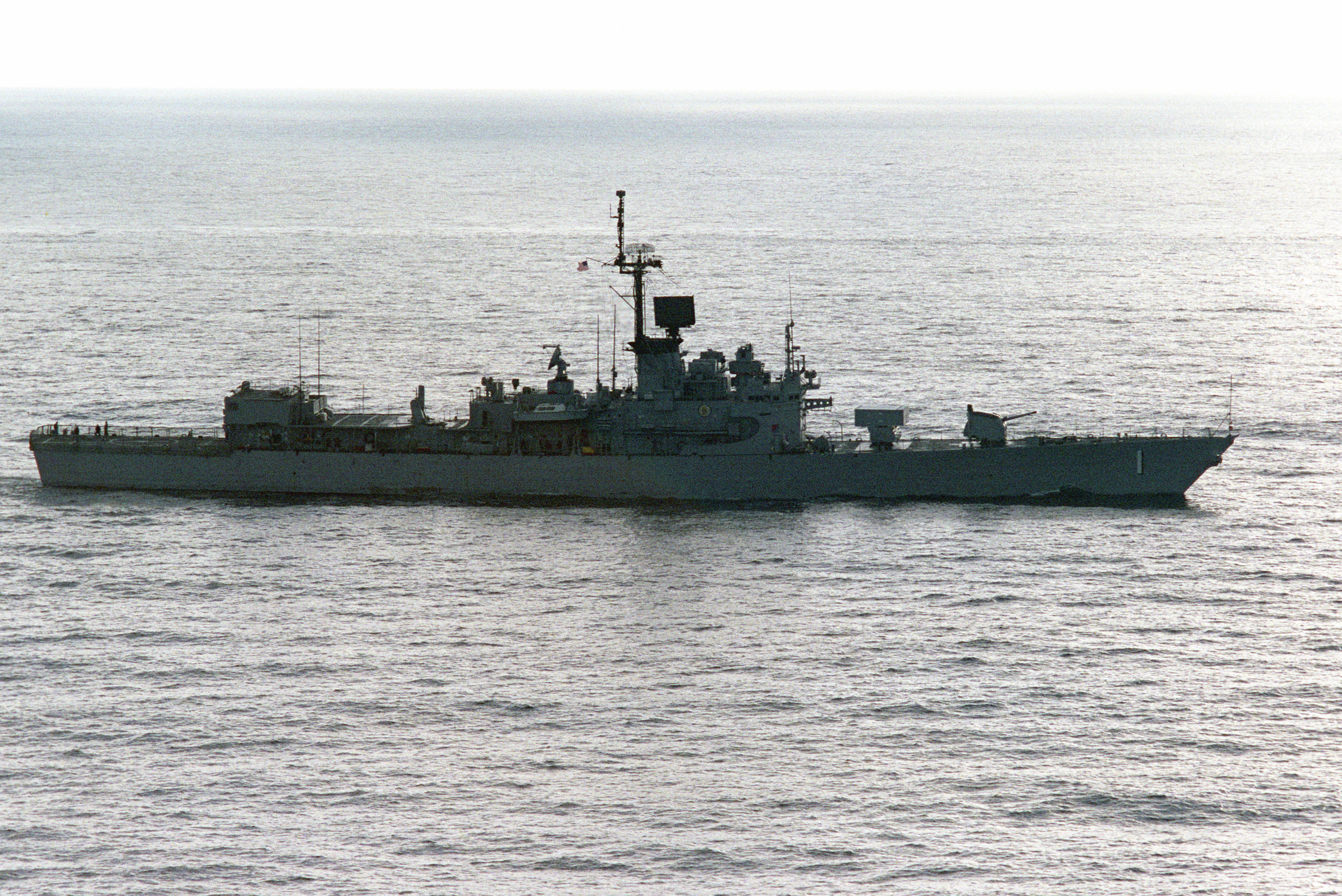
- USS Brooke (FFG-1)

Class overview
- Name: Brooke class
- Builders: Lockheed Shipbuilding and Construction Company, Seattle, Washington, U.S. Bath Iron Works
- Operators: United States Navy; Pakistan Navy
- Preceded by: Garcia class
- Succeeded by: Oliver Hazard Perry class
- Built: 1962–1968
- In commission: 1966–1989
- Planned: 19
- Completed: 6
- Retired: 6

General characteristics
- Type: Guided missile frigate
- Displacement: 2,640 tons std; 3,426 tons full
- Length: 390 ft (118.87 m) (pp); 415 ft 1.5 in (126.53 m) (oa)
- Beam: 44 ft 2.875 in (13.48 m)
- Draft: 14 ft 6 in (4.42 m) (keel, full load); 24 ft 5.75 in (7.46 m) (sonar, full load)
- Propulsion: 2 Foster Wheeler boilers, 1 GE (1-3) or Westinghouse (4-6) geared turbine, 35,000 shp (26 MW), 1 screw
- Speed: 27.2 knots (50.4 km/h; 31.3 mph)
- Range: 4,000 nautical miles (7,400 km; 4,600 mi)
- Complement: 14 officers, 214 crew
- Sensors & processing systems: AN/SPS-52 3D air search radar; AN/SPS-10 surface search radar; AN/SPG-51 missile fire control radar; AN/SQS-26 bow mounted sonar; Mk.56 fire-control system
- Electronic warfare & decoys: AN/SLQ-32
- Armament: 1 × 5-inch (127 mm)/38 caliber gun; 1 × Mk 22 RIM-24 Tartar/RIM-66 Standard missile launcher (16 missiles); 1 × 8 cell ASROC launcher; 2 × triple 12.75 in (324 mm) Mk 32 torpedo tubes, Mk 46 torpedoes (6 torpedoes); 1 × twin Mk 25 torpedo tubes for MK 37 torpedo (fixed, stern, removed later) (8 torpedoes)
- Aircraft carried: 1 SH-2 Seasprite

The Brooke class was a United States Navy frigate class based on the design of the Garcia class, but with the addition of the Tartar Guided Missile System. The first unit was commissioned in 1966 and the final sixth unit was decommissioned in 1989.

== Description ==
Brooke-class ships were nearly identical to the Garcia class, except the second 5-inch/38 caliber gun was replaced with a Mk.22 single arm missile launcher and the requisite Mk.74 Guided Missile Fire Control System to control it. Air search capabilities were provided by the AN/SPS-52 three dimension air search radar, which displaced the two dimension AN/SPS-40 carried on the Garcia class.

FFG-1 through FFG-3 had a Westinghouse geared steam turbine while FFG-4 through FFG-6 employed a General Electric turbine. All ships had two Foster Wheeler boilers. FFG-4 through FFG-6 had an angled base of the bridge structure behind the ASROC launcher for automatic reloading, displacing the loading crane carried on previous ships.

The Brooke class originally carried the DASH drone, but were later equipped with LAMPS SH-2 Seasprite after the hangar was enlarged.

Oliver Hazard Perry class systems were evaluated on Talbot including the 76 mm Mk.75 gun, the AN/SQS-56 sonar and other systems.

Initially classified as guided missile destroyer escorts (DEG), the class were redesignated as guided missile frigates (FFG) under the United States Navy 1975 ship reclassification. FFG-1 through FFG-3 were authorized in FY1962 while FFG-4 through FFG-6 were authorized in FY1963. Plans called for ten more ships to be authorized in FY1964 and possibly three more in later years, but those plans were dropped because of the $11 million higher cost of the DEG over a DE.

== Ships in class ==
Ship name	Hull no.	Crest	Builder	Commission– decommission	Fate	Link
Brooke	FFG-1		Lockheed Shipbuilding and Construction Company, Seattle	1966–1988	Transferred to Pakistan in 1989; disposed of by Navy title transfer to the Maritime Administration, 28 March 1994	
Ramsey	FFG-2		Lockheed Shipbuilding and Construction Company, Seattle	1967–1988	Disposed of in support of Fleet training exercise, 15 June 2000	
Schofield	FFG-3		Lockheed Shipbuilding and Construction Company, Seattle	1968–1988	Disposed of in support of Fleet training exercise, 11/02/1999	
Talbot	FFG-4		Bath Iron Works	1967–1988	Transferred to Pakistan in 1989; disposed of by Navy title transfer to the Maritime Administration, 28 March 1994	
Richard L. Page	FFG-5		Bath Iron Works	1967–1988	Transferred to Pakistan in 1989; disposed of by Navy title transfer to the Maritime Administration, 28 March 1994	
Julius A. Furer	FFG-6		Bath Iron Works	1967–1989	Transferred to Pakistan in 1989; disposed of by Navy title transfer to the Maritime Administration, 28 March 1994	

== Gallery ==
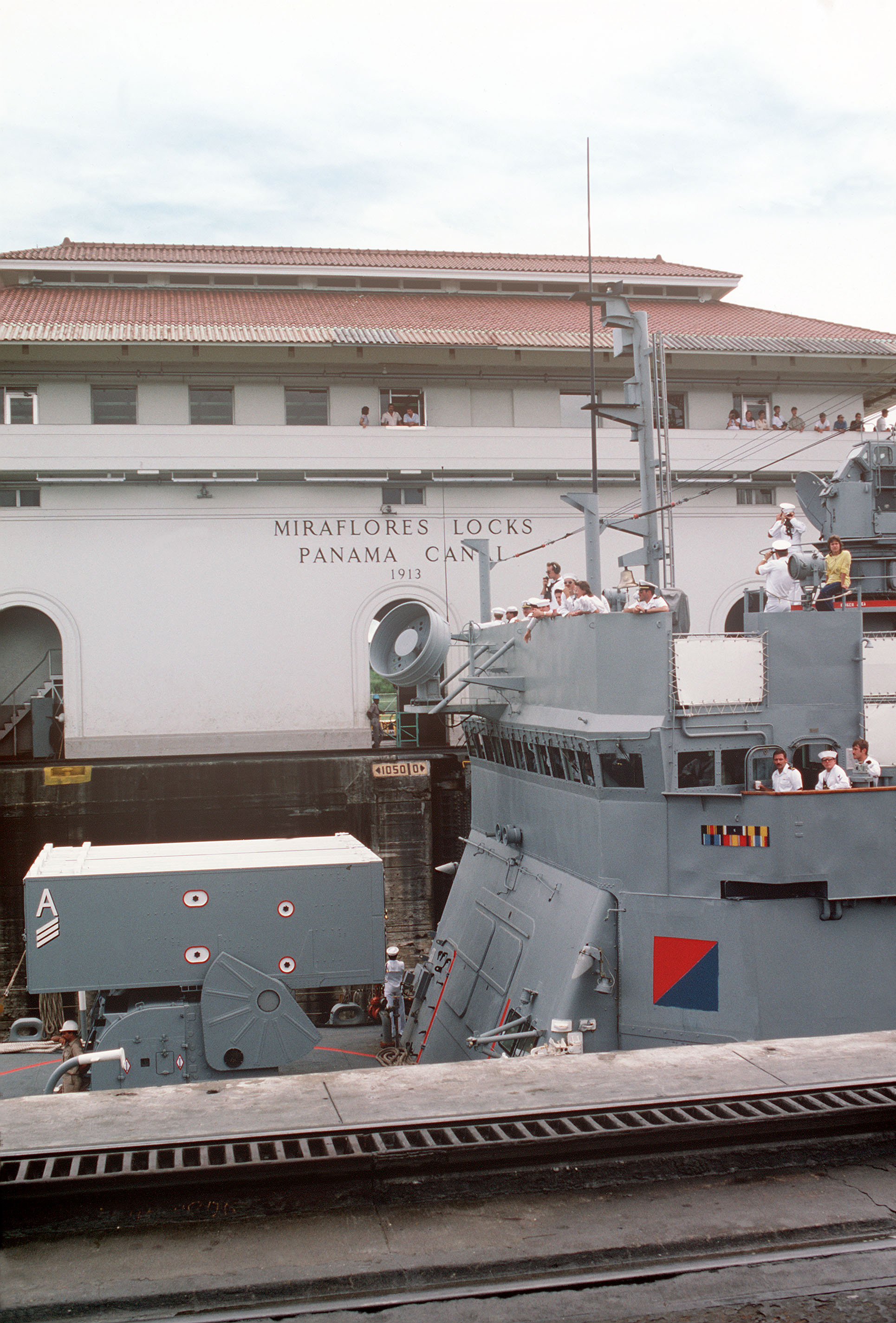
Talbot with angled bridge structure for automated ASROC loading.

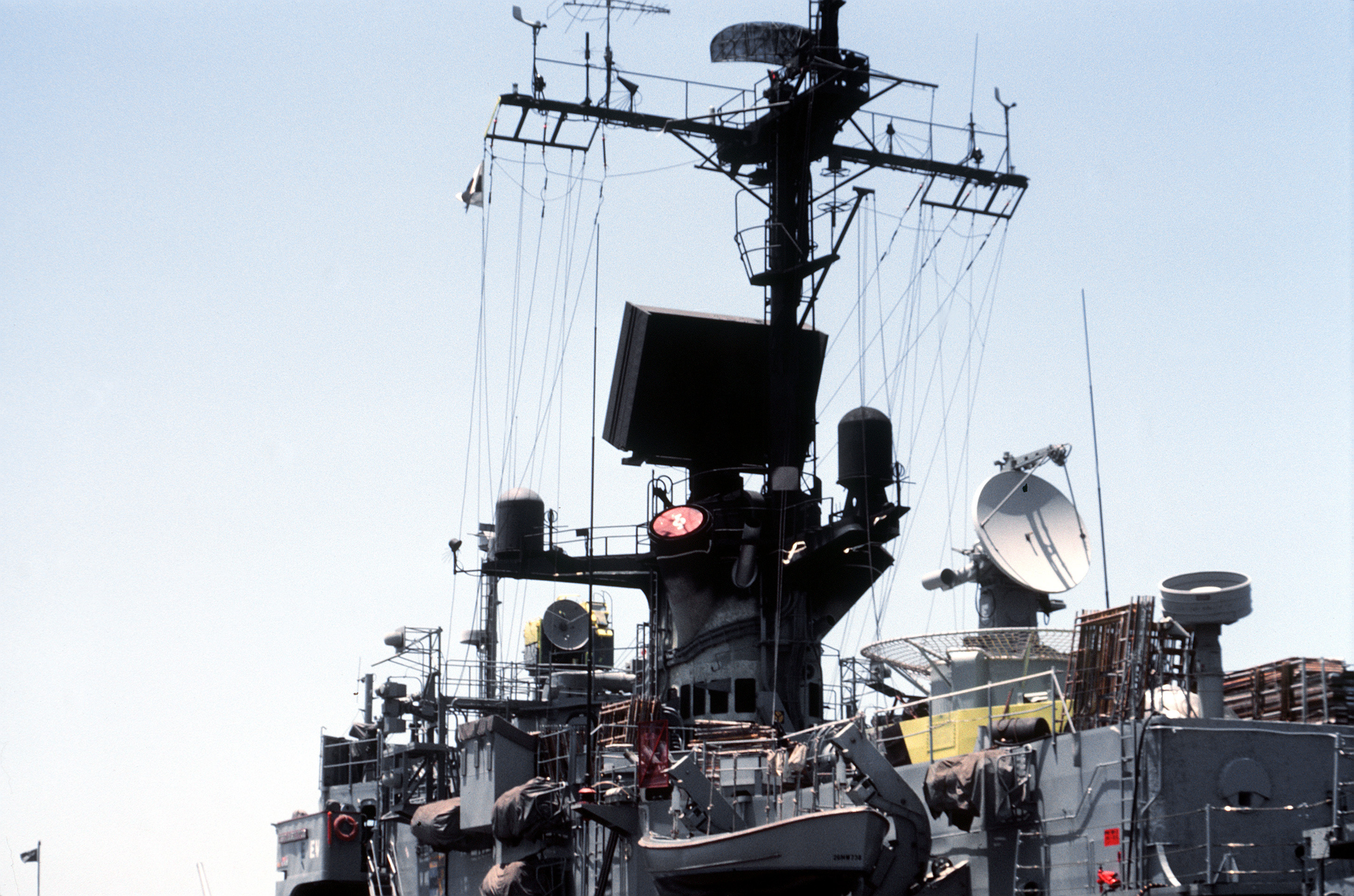
Ramsey's SPS-52, black panel at center and AN/SPG-51, dish at right.

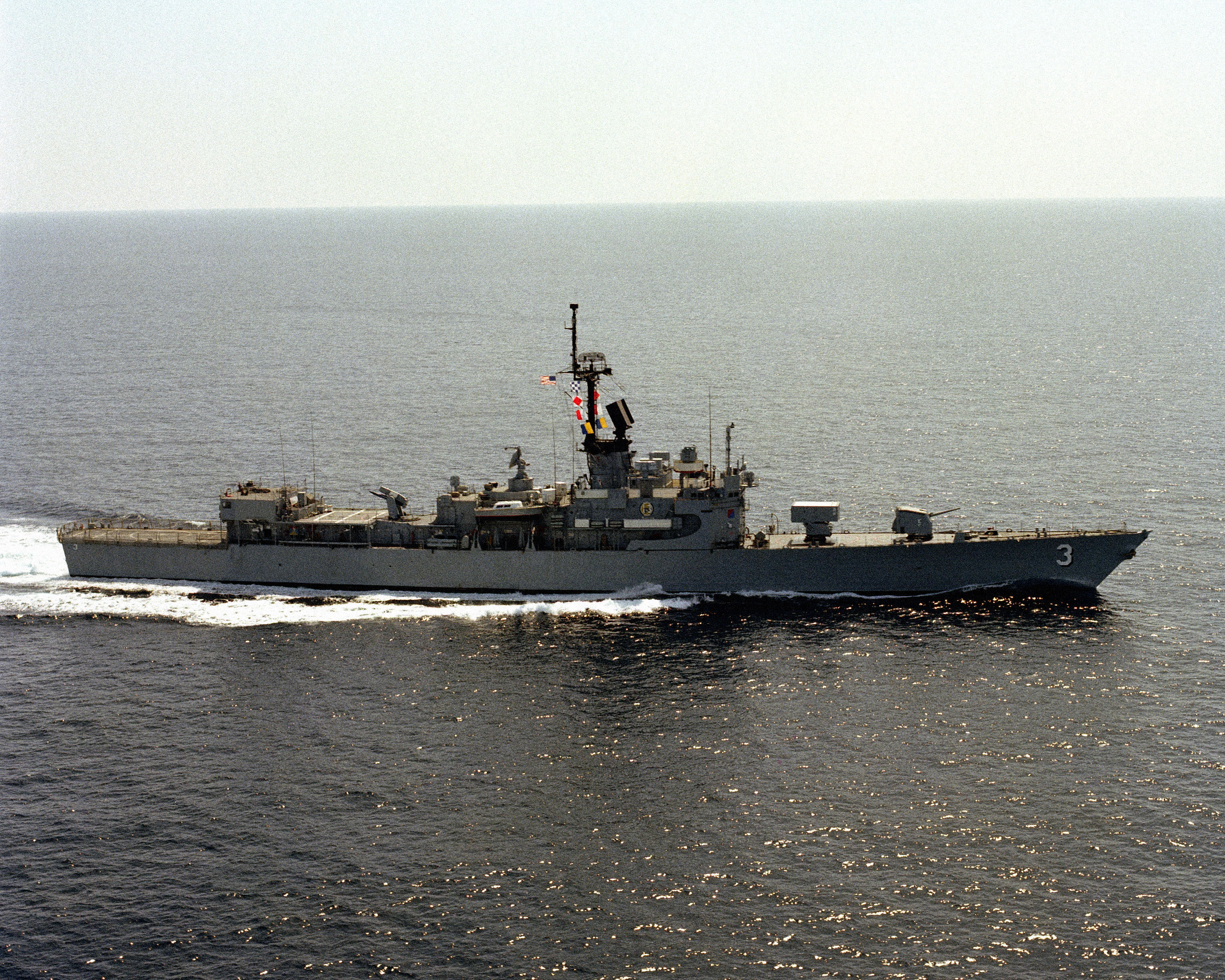
Schofield underway near San Diego, CA

== See also ==
- List of frigate classes by country

Equivalent frigates of the same era

- Alpino class
- Peder Skram class
- Condell class
- Van Speijk class
- Nilgiri class
