= Charles DeWitt Anderson =

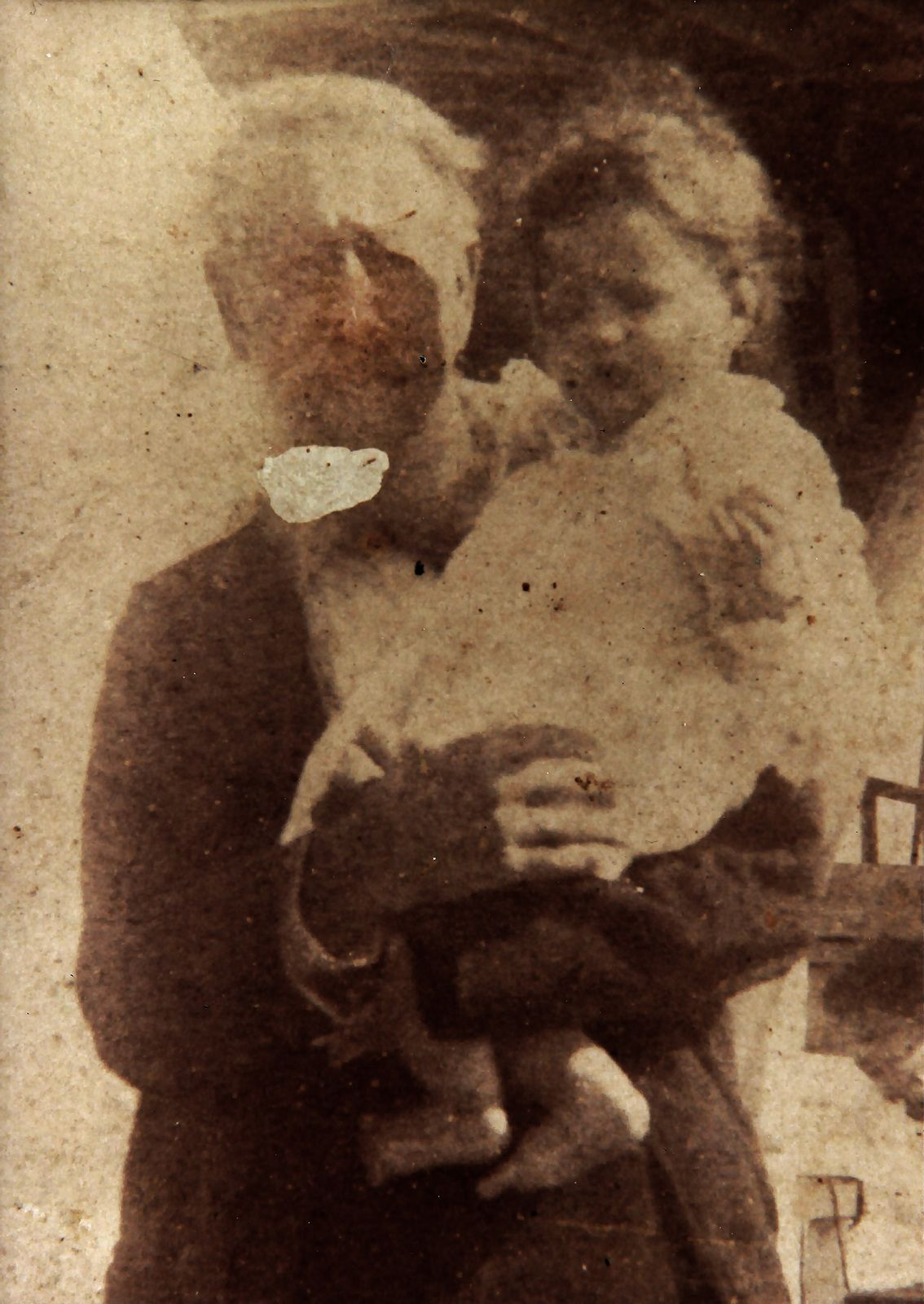
- Anderson holding his grandson, c. 1900
- Born: July 7, 1828; South Carolina
- Died: November 21, 1901 (aged 73); Galveston, Texas
- Burial place: Old Cahill Cemetery in Galveston
- Military career
- Allegiance: United States of America; Confederate States of America
- Branch: United States Army; Confederate States Army
- Service years: 1856–61 (USA); 1861–65 (CSA)
- Rank: First Lieutenant (USA); Colonel (CSA)
- Conflicts: American Civil War

Charles DeWitt Anderson (July 7, 1828 – November 21, 1901) was an American soldier, railway builder, civil engineer, and lighthouse keeper. He served as an officer in the U.S. Army, and later as a Confederate officer during the American Civil War. Anderson was noted for his controversial surrender of Fort Gaines at the Battle of Mobile Bay in August 1864.

== Early life and career ==
Charles DeWitt Anderson was born July 7, 1828, in South Carolina. In 1839 his family immigrated by sea to Texas, at the time an independent nation and not a U.S. state until 1845. During the voyage both of his parents died, and after arriving at the port of Galveston Anderson and his brother were adopted by an Episcopal minister, who raised them both.

In 1846 Anderson became the first Texan appointed to the United States Military Academy at West Point. He had been recommended by Texas' founder, Sam Houston, and he began attending on September 1. Anderson struggled academically at West Point; during his sophomore year he was found "deficient" in both French and mathematics, and resigned from the academy on November 13, 1848. Despite this, in 1856 Anderson was directly commissioned into the U.S. Army as a second lieutenant on June 27. He was assigned to the 4th U.S. Artillery and was promoted to first lieutenant on July 6, 1859. Anderson served with the 4th in Florida and then in the Utah Territory, and he was there when the Civil War began in 1861. Acquiring a leave of absence he headed home, and (after covering about 100 miles of wintry terrain) Anderson then decided to resign from the U.S. Army, which was accepted effective on April 1, 1861.

== Civil War service ==
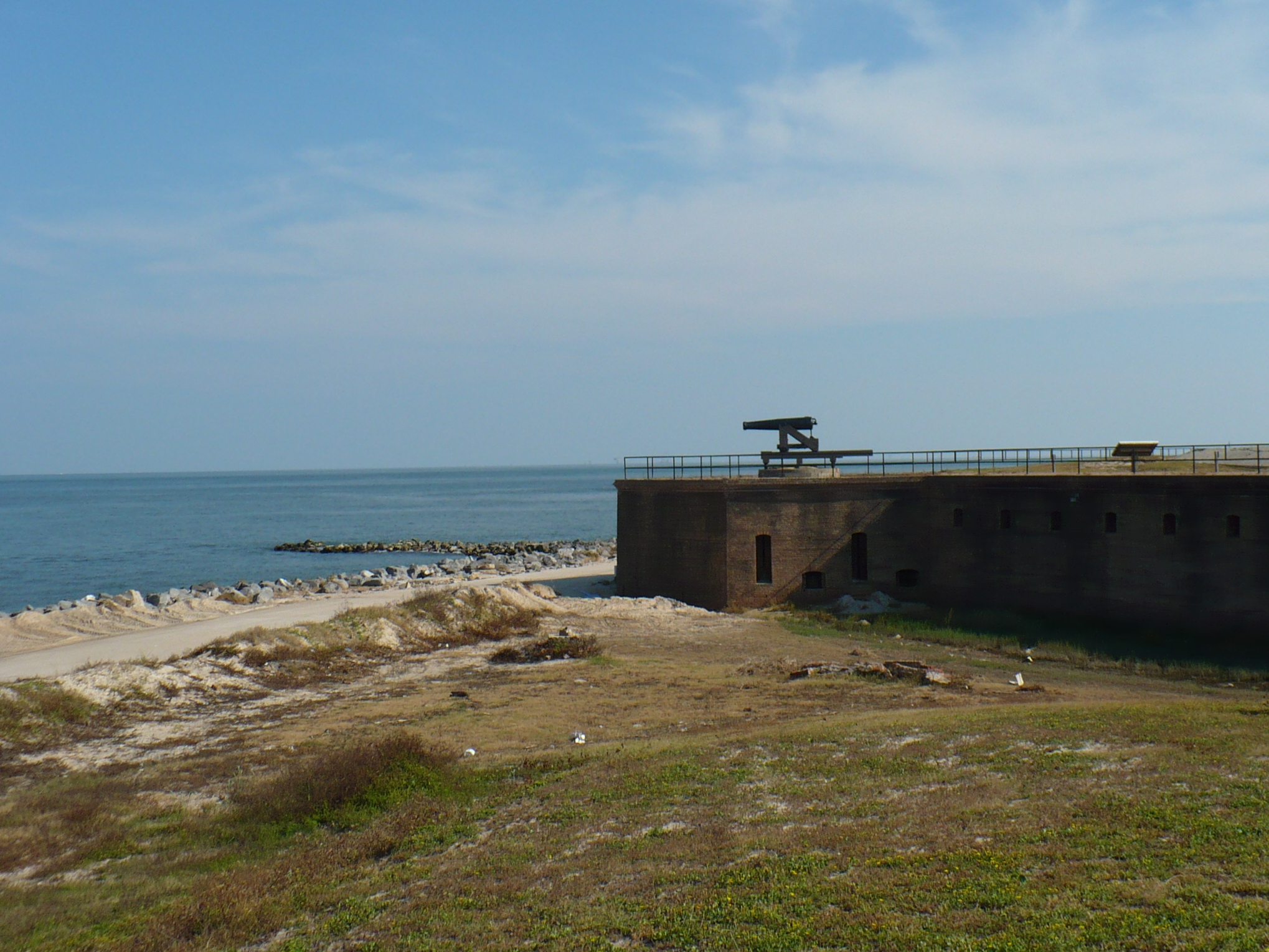
Fort Gaines, Alabama, as it appeared in 2008

At the beginning of the American Civil War in 1861, Anderson chose to follow his home state and the Confederate cause. On March 16 he was appointed a first lieutenant in the Regular Confederate Artillery. His first assignment was at Fort Morgan, guarding the entrance to Mobile Bay, Alabama. There he was given command a regular detachment, organized separately from the volunteer forces but attached to the 2nd Alabama Infantry, and was responsible for the installation's ordnance. His total force consisted of the remaining regular recruits from the Mount Vernon Arsenal in Alabama, and numbered only two officers and nine enlisted men. On November 9 Anderson entered the volunteer service for good, appointed a major in the 20th Alabama Infantry, and command of his regulars fell to 2nd Lt. Alfred M. O'Neal.

In late 1861 Anderson and the 20th Alabama were stationed at Knoxville, Tennessee, and on February 15, 1862, he left the unit to join the staff of Brig. Gen. Adley H. Gladden, posted at Mobile, Alabama. That April during the Battle of Shiloh, Anderson acted as his assistant adjutant general, but following Gladden's death in the battle the staff was broken up. The following month Anderson took command of the 21st Alabama Infantry, elected its colonel on May 8. The regiment became part of the defenses of Mobile, with Anderson commanding it for the remainder of 1862, all of 1863, and into 1864. From October 1862 to June 1863, Anderson commanded Companies A, B, C, and F, of the 21st Infantry's 1st Battalion while they were assigned to Fort Stonewall and Fort Sidney Johnston in Clarke County, Alabama.

=== Fort Gaines ===
By May 1864 Anderson was an acting brigadier general in the Confederate Army. That fall Union forces were operating against Mobile Bay, and Anderson was given command of Fort Gaines, situated directly across from Fort Morgan and resting on Dauphin Island. On August 5 the Union Navy ran past both forts, landing the infantry of Maj. Gen. Gordon Granger. Both forces then began bombarding Fort Gaines, with the heavy naval shells easily passing through the fort's walls. Despite receiving only moderate damage, Anderson's men panicked and demanded he surrender, which at first Anderson rejected, but realizing his command was about to mutiny he conceded defeat on August 8, after three days of shelling. Military historian Bruce Allardice summarized Anderson's predicament:

Union shells were penetrating the walls of Fort Gaines as if they were made of cheese. The small fort was encumbered with a superfluous number of conscripts and reservists, many mere boys, who could find no shelter from the shelling. Their panic spread to the rest of the garrison. At first Anderson was inclined to resist, but seeing that the officers and men were demoralized... and ready to mutiny, Anderson gave in.

Anderson turned over between 818 and 864 men as well as 26 cannon. His superior, Brig. Gen. Richard L. Page, criticized the surrender as a "deed of dishonor and disgrace" and for his allowing Lt. Col. James M. Williams (Anderson's second in command) to abandon nearby Fort Powell late on August 5. Page said this despite his own surrender of Fort Morgan two weeks later and after a single day of bombardment. Military historian David J. Eicher considered Anderson's actions a "halfhearted attempt to defend the position." Anderson would spend the rest of the war confined to a military prison in New Orleans, Louisiana, and was paroled in 1865. David Farragut, the admiral commanding the Union Navy vessels during Battle of Mobile Bay, had Anderson in mind with one of his dying wishes. He requested that the sword he received during Anderson's surrender be returned to Anderson "in recognition of his gallantry." Farragut stated in his official report of the battle "that Anderson had put up a better fight than Page."

== Postbellum career and death ==
Returning to Texas after the conflict ended in 1865, Anderson found work in the construction of railroads. He was then elected for two terms as Austin's chief engineer. Anderson next went back to Galveston, Texas, where he built the Galveston Island Lighthouse. Beginning in 1895 and until his death six years later, Anderson was the lighthouse's keeper. He died there, reportedly of the "grippe", in November 1901, and was buried in Old Cahill Cemetery in Galveston.
