= Richard Lucian Page =

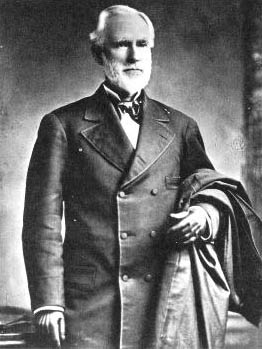
- Richard Lucian Page
- Born: December 20, 1807; Clarke County, Virginia
- Died: August 9, 1901 (aged 93); Blue Ridge Summit, Pennsylvania
- Burial place: Cedar Hill Cemetery, Norfolk, Virginia
- Relatives: Robert E. Lee (cousin); Thomas Nelson Page (cousin)
- Military career
- Allegiance: United States; Confederate States
- Branch: United States Navy; Confederate States Navy; Confederate States Army
- Service years: 1824–1861 (USN); 1861–1864 (CSN); 1864–1865 (CSA)
- Rank: Commander (USN); Captain (CSN); Brigadier General (CSA)
- Conflicts: Mexican–American War; American Civil War: Battle of Port Royal; Siege of Fort Morgan

Richard Lucian Page (December 20, 1807 – August 9, 1901) was a United States Navy officer who joined the Confederate States Navy and later became a brigadier general in the Confederate States Army during the American Civil War.

== Early life ==
Richard L. Page was born in Clarke County, Virginia on December 20, 1807, to William Byrd Page (1768–1812) and Ann (Lee) Page (b. 1776). He was a maternal cousin of future Confederate general Robert E. Lee and a paternal cousin of the poet Thomas Nelson Page. He was also maternally related to Charles Lee, who was U.S. Attorney General during the Washington Administration and the John Adams Administration. He attended the common schools in Clarke County and in Alexandria, Virginia.

== Early military service ==
Richard Lucian Page joined the U.S. Navy as a midshipman on March 12, 1824, and his first assignment in 1824–1825 was on board USS John Adams of the U.S. Navy West Indies Squadron led by Commodore David Porter. In 1825, he was ordered to USS Brandywine and was with the crew when it carried General Marquis de Lafayette back to France under the leadership of U.S. Navy Captain Charles Morris. Now in Europe, Midshipman Page was transferred to USS Constitution where he served with this U.S. Navy Mediterranean Squadron ship until it returned to the port of Boston, Massachusetts on Independence Day, 1828.

Page's next assignment came on USS Constellation after which he prepared for his naval examination. In 1830–1834, Passed Midshipman and Sailing Master Richard Page served on board USS Concord with the U.S. Navy Mediterranean Squadron.

On March 26, 1834, Richard Page was commissioned a U.S. Navy Lieutenant and was ordered to serve on USS Enterprise which was going overseas. He was then transferred to USS Ontario, then transferred back to Enterprise and then finally landing on USS Peacock which brought him back to the United States in October 1837. After his around-the-world tour of duty, Lieutenant Page was given a two-year leave of absence to visit Europe in 1837–1839.

Upon returning to duty in 1839, Page will serve at the Gosport Navy Yard as an ordnance officer. During this tour of duty at Norfolk, he married a local woman, Alexina Taylor, in 1841; they would have four children. After duty at the navy yard, he then took to the seas again on board USS Macedonian for two years. In 1844–1845, he was back with the U.S. Navy Mediterranean Squadron on board USS Fairfield. Upon returning to the United States in 1845, he served with the docked USS Pennsylvania at the U.S. Navy Norfolk Naval Ship Yard.

== Mexican–American War and afterwards ==
During the Mexican–American War of 1846–1848, he served for two years as a lieutenant commander on board USS Independence. This ship served as the flagship for U.S. Navy Pacific Squadron Commander, Commodore William Shubrick.

After this war, in 1849–1852, he was back doing ordnance duty at the U.S. Navy Norfolk Navy Ship Yard. Then in 1852–1854, Lieutenant Commander Page served as commander of USS Perry with the U.S. Navy Africa Squadron. Upon returning from Africa, Page was back at Norfolk, this time as an executive officer and a Member of the Retiring Board.

On September 14, 1855, U.S. Navy Lieutenant Commander Richard Page was promoted to commander in the midst of his 1854–1857 service while at Norfolk, Virginia. In 1857–1859, Commander Page was with the U.S. Navy East India Squadron serving as commander of USS Germantown. Then he returned to Norfolk where serve from 1859 to 1861.

As soon as the Commonwealth of Virginia ceded from the Union, U.S. Navy Commander Richard Lucian Page resigned his rank and office while at the Navy Yard.

== With the Confederates ==
Now out of the U.S. Navy, Richard L. Page next served as a naval aide-de-camp to the Governor of Virginia John Letcher with special duties to organize a State of Virginia Navy. While in this Office, Page supervised the building of fortifications at the mouth of the James River as well as those on the Nansemond River and on the Pagan River.

On June 10, 1861, Richard Page received a commission as a Confederate States of America Navy Commander. Prior to the evacuation at Norfolk, Virginia, he served at the shipyard. Upon being promoted to C.S. Navy captain a short time later, Page went on to establish the ordnance and construction depot located at Charlotte, North Carolina, which he would largely manage during the period of 1861–1864. During this time of 1861–1864, however, he would also briefly be in command of C.S. Navy forces at Savannah, Georgia, and would also be active in the Battle of Port Royal in November 1861, where he served on CSS Savannah under the fleet command of C.S. Navy squadron Flag Officer Josiah Tattnall III.

Then on March 1, 1864, Richard Page left the C.S. Navy to join the C.S. Army; he got a commission as a C.S. Army Brigadier General. He was then assigned to take command of the outer defenses of the C.S. Army held location at Mobile Bay, Alabama and would set up his headquarters at Fort Morgan.

Brigadier General Page was in command of the Confederate garrison that controlled Fort Morgan, Alabama during the Union's attacks on Mobile Bay. Fort Morgan withstood the Union attack on April 5, 1864, but was besieged on April 9.

Then on August 8, 1864, a 10,000-man and 200-cannon Union task force arrived to challenge Page's 400-man and 26-cannon Confederate force. Union task force staff summoned Page and told him to surrender; he replied that he would defend the fort to the end. Federal troops then moved their works closer to the outdated fort for the next two weeks. Then on August 22, 1864, heavy Union cannon fire replaced the lighter cannon fire of the previous two weeks. For the next 12 hours, 3,000 Union cannon shells were thrown at the fort. This Union cannon fire started some fires in the fort and threatened to ignite the Confederate powder magazine, and so the defenders put the powder kegs in the cisterns. On August 23 Brigadier General Richard Lucian Page unconditionally surrendered the fort, because his troops had little usable gunpowder. Indignant, he broke his sword over his knee instead of surrendering his sword to the Federals. Page's situation was further worsened when he was suspected of destroying munitions and works within the fort after he had agreed to surrender.

He was arrested by the Federal authorities and imprisoned at Fort Delaware on Pea Patch Island until September 1865.

== Late life ==
Page returned to Norfolk after the war, eventually becoming superintendent of public schools from 1875 to 1883.

He died in Blue Ridge Summit, Pennsylvania, on August 9, 1901 and is buried in Cedar Grove Cemetery, Norfolk, Virginia.

== Honors ==
In Confederate Military History: Volume 3 Clement A. Evans, himself a former C.S. Army Brigadier General, was moved to write the following on the defense of Fort Morgan on August 22–23, 1864, "The defense of Fort Morgan, under the command of (Brigadier) General Page, is one of the most celebrated instances of heroism in the history of the war."

USS Richard L. Page, a Brooke-class frigate built for the United States Navy in 1965, was named in his honor.

== See also ==
- List of American Civil War generals (Confederate)
