= Siege of Fort Morgan =

1864 battle of the American Civil War

Coordinates: 30°13′41″N 88°1′23″W

- Part of the American Civil War
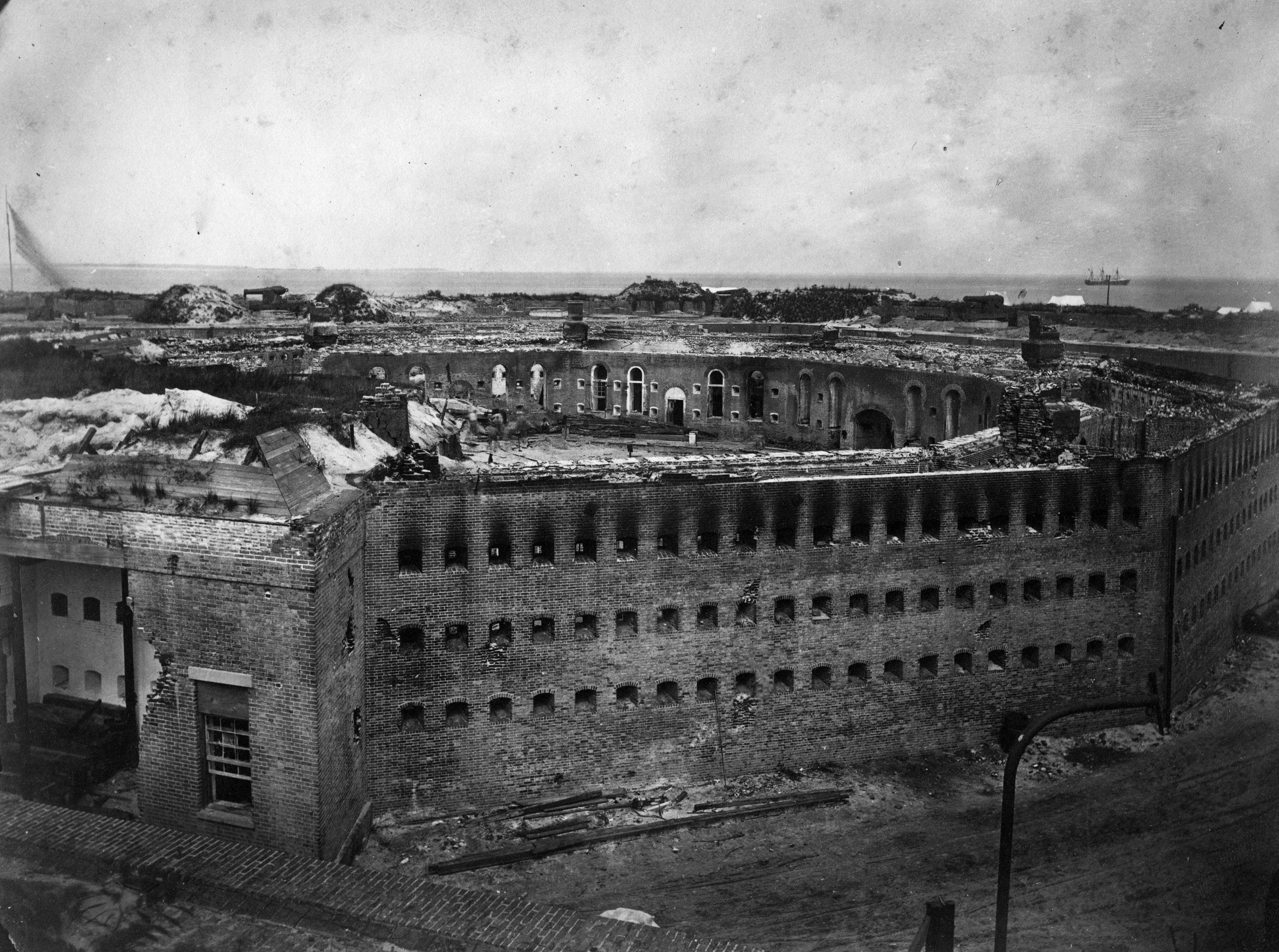
- Fort Morgan, Mobile Point, Alabama, 1864, showing damage to the south side of the fort following the battle and subsequent siege.
Date	August 9 – August 23, 1864
Location	Fort Morgan, Alabama
Result	Union victory

Belligerents
United States (Union)	Confederate States

Commanders and leaders
Gordon Granger	Richard L. Page

Strength
5,500	618

Casualties and losses
1 killed 7 wounded	3 killed 15 wounded 600 surrendered

The siege of Fort Morgan occurred during the American Civil War, as part of the battle for Mobile Bay, in the Confederate state of Alabama during August 1864. Union ground forces led by General Gordon Granger conducted a short siege of the Confederate garrison at the mouth of Mobile Bay under the command of General Richard L. Page. The Confederate surrender helped shut down Mobile, Alabama, as an effective Confederate port city.

== Background ==
Admiral David Farragut had defeated the Confederate navy in Mobile Bay on August 5, and Fort Gaines, guarding the western approach to the bay, had surrendered to the cooperating Union land forces under Maj. Gen. Gordon Granger. Granger and Farragut next turned their full attention to Fort Morgan on Mobile Point, east across from Fort Gaines. The fort was a powerful but outdated fortification garrisoned by 600 men under the command of Robert E. Lee's cousin, Brig. Gen. Richard L. Page.

== Siege ==
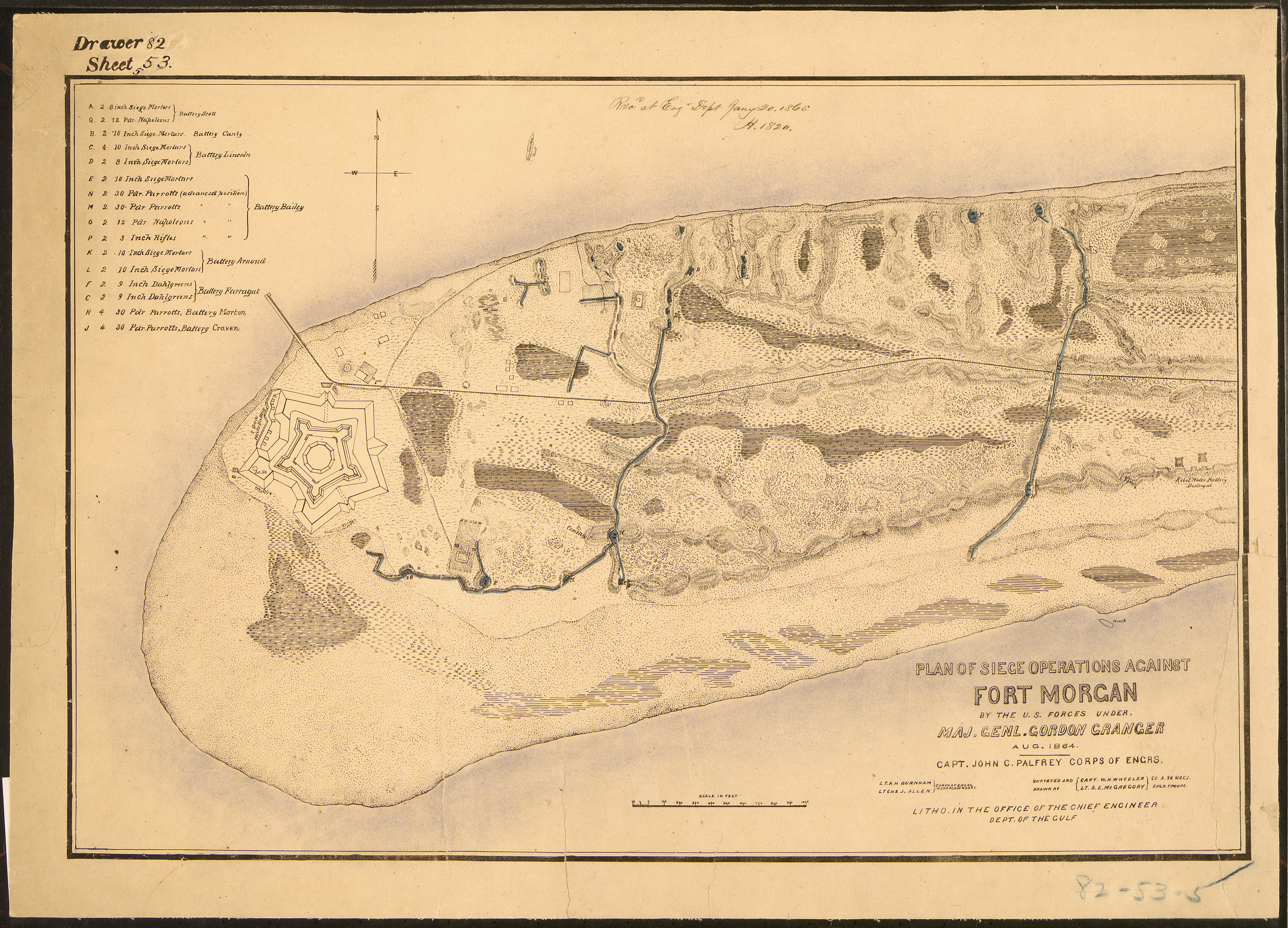
Plan of Siege Operations.

Granger's soldiers landed at Pilot Town on August 9 and began moving siege artillery within range. The Union fleet also turned their guns on the fort. For the next two weeks Union forces kept up a heavy and consistent artillery fire. On August 16 the Confederates abandoned two batteries of the outer defenses and Granger moved his siege mortars within 500 yards of the fort and his 30-pounder rifled guns to within 1,200 yards.

On August 23, General Page unconditionally surrendered the fort. Page's situation was further worsened when he was suspected of destroying munitions and works within the fort after the surrender agreement. For this he was arrested by the Federal authorities and imprisoned.

== Aftermath ==
The fall of Fort Morgan to the Union forces sealed the mouth of Mobile Bay. The city of Mobile, Alabama would fall on April 12, at the end of the Civil War, after the Battle of Fort Blakeley on April 9, 1865.

General Page remained imprisoned until July. A court of inquiry was convened in New Orleans to investigate the charges against Page for violating the laws of war. The court, however, found him "Not Guilty". The court found that much of the destruction of ammunition resulted from a fire in the Citadel and that Confederates had spiked the artillery pieces before they had raised a white flag of surrender.
