= William J. McCluney =

United States Navy officer

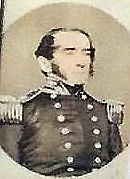
- Photographer unknown c. 1856-1858
- Born: 12 April 1796; Washington, Pennsylvania
- Died: 11 February 1864; Brooklyn, New York
- Burial place: Green-Wood Cemetery, later reburied at Laurel Hill Cemetery
- Spouse(s): Elizabeth Shoemaker Wharton (1813–1896) m. 8 November 1841
- Children: Deborah Wharton (1843–1848); Arabella (1850–1931)
- Relatives: James McCluney (Belfast, N.Ireland); Martha Levy (Philadelphia, PA, US)
- Military career
- Allegiance: United States
- Branch: United States Navy
- Service years: 1 January 1812 – 21 December 1861
- Rank: Commodore
- Commands: USS Revenge; USS Franklin; USS Hudson; USS Vandlia; USS John Adams; USS Mississippi; USS Powhatan; Stevens Battery; Home Squadron; USS Roanoke - flagship
- Conflicts: War of 1812: USS Wasp vs HMB Frolic; Mexican–American War: Battle of Palo Alto; Siege of Veracruz; Battle of Tuxpan; Battle of Tobasco; Opium Wars: Battle of Ty-ho Bay
- Awards: Congressional Silver Medal

Commodore William J. McCluney (12 April 1796 — 11 February 1864) was a United States Navy officer whose service included the War of 1812, the Mexican-American War, and the Battle of Ty-ho Bay, China. McCluney commanded two of the flagships—the USS Mississippi and the USS Powhatan—in support of the Perry Expedition to Japan in 1853-1854. As a flag officer, McCluney transported the first Japanese Embassy to the United States aboard his flagship, the USS Roanoke, in 1860 on the last leg of their journey.

== Early life ==
Born near Washington, Pennsylvania on 12 April 1796, William was the first child and only son of merchant James McCluney and Martha Levy. William's father died in 1799 leaving him, his mother, and two infant sisters on the Pennsylvania frontier. Four-year-old William's mother moved the family to Philadelphia in 1800. To support her family, William's mother became a shopkeeper in the heart of Philadelphia's commercial center. William's childhood was spent along the waterfront of America's busiest port. At age 15, McCluney applied for a commission in the U.S. Navy and on 1 January 1812, he became a midshipman. His first assignment was aboard the sloop-of-war USS Wasp (1807) under Master Commandant Jacob Jones and first Lieutenant James Biddle, a fellow Philadelphian.

== Early naval service ==
=== War of 1812 ===
McCluney's naval career began on the eve of the second war between the United States and Great Britain—now called the War of 1812. McCluney may have been aboard the Wasp returning from a diplomatic mission to France when the war hawks in Congress and President James Madison declared war on 18 June. For certain, he was aboard when the Wasp sailed from Philadelphia on 13 October with orders to harass British commercial shipping. After a storm damaged the ship and swept two crewmen overboard, the Wasp sighted a convoy of merchantmen accompanied by warships.

On Sunday morning 18 October, the Wasp closed with the convoy and engaged the 22-gun brig-sloop HMB Frolic. The ships exchanged broadside after broadside at close range, at times hull-to-hull in heavy seas. Finally, the Wasp pulled ahead and unleashed raking fire the length of Frolic's deck.

Wasp First Officer James Biddle led the boarding party to discover the destruction of the Frolic, both ship and crew. All of Frolic's officers and more than half her men were dead or wounded. Wounded British Commander Thomas Whinyates surrendered, but was unable to strike the Frolic's colors. Lieutenant Biddle struck for him. Moments later, both of Frolic's masts fell "by-the-board". The Wasp was badly damaged as well. Five men were dead and five wounded.

Contemporary historians described the Wasp-Frolic battle as possibly the most intense single-ship action of the war. Commandant Jones put a prize-crew aboard the Frolic to jury-rig repairs and assist the Frolic's surgeon with the wounded.

Neither victor nor vanquished could sail. Sunday afternoon, the 74-gun British battleship HMS Poitiers arrived, forcing both the Wasp and her prize to surrender.

At dawn, Sunday, 18 October, five days from his home in Philadelphia, McCluney, 16, the least experienced officer aboard the Wasp, could only imagine the coming duel of warships. By noon, McCluney had witnessed the death and dismemberment of more than a hundred comrades and enemy. By evening, he was a prisoner of war. Thus began a 50-year naval career.

See main article: Capture of HMS Frolic

=== Reception at home ===
The British paroled the men of the Wasp in Bermuda and they returned to the United States.

Officers and crew were greeted as national heroes. Along with the crew of the USS United States which had captured the HMS Macedonian seven days after the Wasp-Frolic battle, the sailors were celebrated in Baltimore, Philadelphia, and New York. Congress voted $25,000 to officers and crew of the Wasp, compensation for the loss of their prize. A gold Congressional medal—precursor to the Medal of Honor—was awarded to Jones. Silver medals were awarded to the officers.

Jones was promoted to captain and command of the now USS Macedonian. Biddle was promoted to master commandant and command of Wasp's sister ship, USS Hornet. McCluney received a share of the Congressional prize money, a silver medal, and assignment to the Macedonian. By spring 1813, the British blockade of North America kept the Macedonian and sister ships confined to New York and New London harbors. The naval war shifted from the Atlantic to the Great Lakes. McCluney was ordered to Sacketts Harbor, NY by way of New York City, taking charge of such recruits as were available for Lake Ontario.

McCluney was assigned to the frigate USS Superior on Lake Ontario. He later served aboard the USS Saranac, both under the command of Lieutenant John H. Elton.

=== Inter-war service ===
Promoted to Lieutenant in 1818, McCluney got his first command, an old 1808 Jefferson Gunboat #158 in Charleston, S.C. He was ordered "to prepare for service…and attend to repairs." Repairs were sufficient that, a year later McCluney's gunboat was recommissioned as the schooner USS Revenge. Two years later, Lieut. McCluney became first officer on a new schooner, the USS Dolphin under the command of Lieutenant David Conner.

The Dolphin's assignment was companion to the 90-gun ship-of-the-line USS Franklin, flagship of the United States' first Pacific Squadron under command of Commodore Charles Stewart. Upon completion of McCluney's tour, he was ordered to Washington as witness in the court martial of Commodore Stewart as a result of Stewart's wife's intrigues involving royalists and rebels in Chile and Peru.

After nearly three years in the Pacific, McCluney became second lieutenant on the frigate USS Constellation, flagship to the West India Squadron engaged in suppressing piracy.

From the summer of 1828 until fall 1830, McCluney served in the Mediterranean, first aboard the sloop USS Fairfield, then the USS Lexington. The last year of his Mediterranean tour, McCluney was first officer of the sloop USS Warren under Commander Charles W. Skinner.

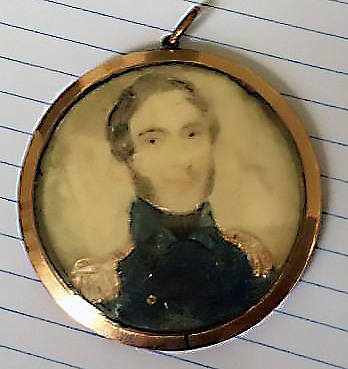
Miniature of Commander William J. McCluney, gift to Elizabeth Wharton, about the time of their marriage, 1841.

In 1831, McCluney was assigned command of the Franklin and later the Hudson, both serving as receiving ships for new recruits at the New York Navy Yard in Brooklyn. Subsequently, McCluney made Brooklyn his home.

=== Break in service ===
There is discontinuity in active service from the late 1830s, possibly because of health or an injury, though in 1839 he was promoted to commander. A Washington newspaper cited McCluney as an example of the Navy's "unemployed officers" in 1842. The paper reported a "disease of the knee joint" rendered him unfit for duty but that "an operation was performed…and he was cured, immediately applying for sea service."

== Family life ==
=== Marriage ===
During his extended leave from sea duty and with his promotion to commander McCluney became engaged to Elizabeth Shoemaker Wharton, the daughter of William Moore Wharton and Deborah Shoemaker, both of Philadelphia. On 8 November 1841, William and Elizabeth were married. In 1843, their first child, Deborah Wharton McCluney, was born. A second daughter, Arabella was born in 1850.

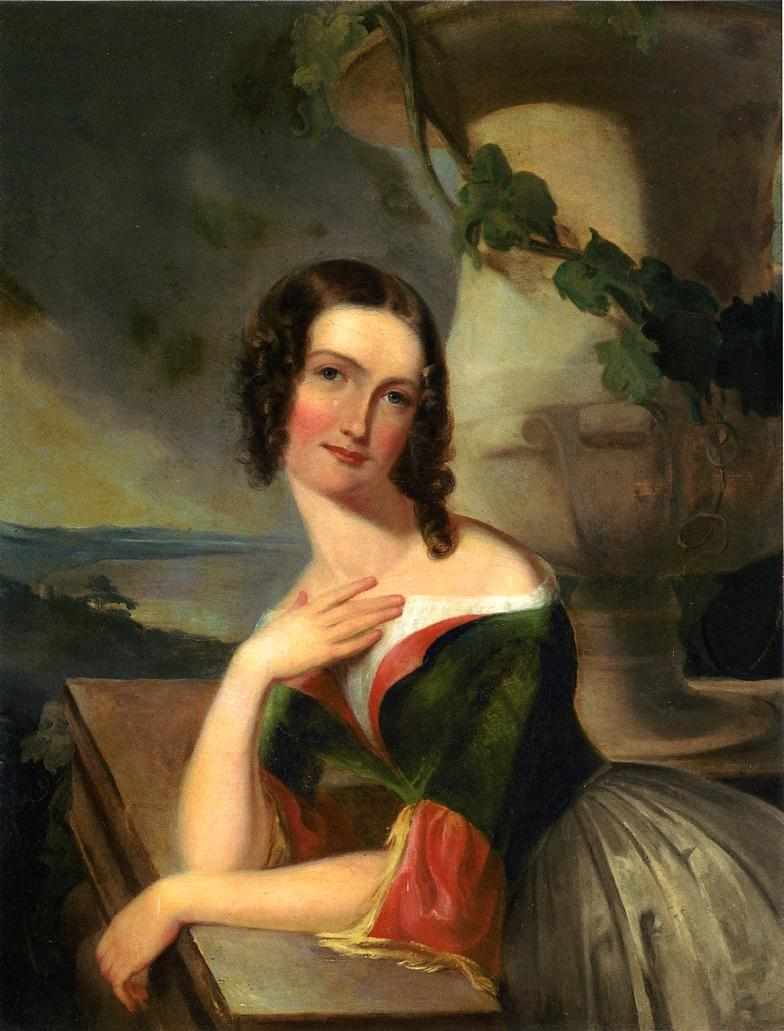
Elizabeth Shoemaker Wharton married Commander William J. McCluney November 8, 1841. Portrait by Thomas Sully.

== Later naval career ==
In 1841 McCluney gained command of the sloop USS Vandalia. As part of the newly created Home Squadron, the Vandalia cruised the Atlantic from Newfoundland to Brazil and the West Indies.

=== Mexican-American War ===
In the spring of 1845, McCluney was ordered to command the frigate USS John Adams. At the time, the Republic of Texas was being annexed by the United States and became the 28th state on 29 December. U.S. President James Polk was maneuvering to purchase or forcibly occupy disputed lands along the not-yet-agreed Mexico-Texas border. Polk had designs on California and the Mexican territories between California and Texas as well. The resulting Mexican–American War, primarily a land war, nevertheless involved the U.S. Navy in both the Pacific and the Caribbean. The Navy's role was blockade of Mexico and support of U.S. troops. The John Adams first engagement came in May 1846. McCluney anchored off Brazos Santiago along with Commodore David Conner's flagship, the USS Raritan, and the USS Potomac. On 18 May, during the Battle of Palo Alto, Commander McCluney joined Captain Francis H. Gregory of the Raritan forming a combined force of 500 seamen and marines for a successful amphibious assault on the military depot at Point Isabel (now Texas).

In March 1847, Vice Commodore Mathew C. Perry assumed command of the squadron, and initiated more aggressive actions against Mexico. Perry commenced a landing on Tuxpan with officers and men from the squadron. McCluney led 10 officers and 111 men from the John Adams. In June, Perry launched a similar amphibious assault 80-miles up the Tobasco River to take the provincial capital Villahermosa. McCluney and 1,400 sailors captured the mostly abandoned town before returning to their ships off the coastal town of Frontera.

=== Post War ===
Following the war, McCluney returned to his Brooklyn home and family, accepting command of rendezvous at the New York Navy Yard from March 1848 to March 1850. In August of 1848, the McCluney's daughter, Deborah, died at age five during an epidemic of dysentery called "cholera infantum." A second daughter, Arabella, was born November 1850 "At Sea," according to 1850 Census Records, probably aboard McCluney's "receiving ship" at the Navy Yard in Brooklyn.

On 13 October 1851, McCluney was promoted to captain.

=== Expedition to Japan ===
In January 1852, McCluney was ordered to Philadelphia Navy Yard to prepare the USS Mississippi as flagship for Commodore Perry's planned expedition to Japan. The newly refitted steam frigate Mississippi was recommissioned under McCluney's command 11 May 1852. Perry raised his flag aboard the Mississippi upon McCluney's arrival in New York. The vessel was diverted, however, from preparation for Japan to resolution of a diplomatic dispute off Nova Scotia. At the request of Secretary of State Daniel Webster, President Millard Fillmore ordered the Mississippi to intervene between British-Canadian and American commercial fisherman. The diversion served as a training opportunity for commodore, captain, and crew.

After the fishing dispute, Perry and McCluney proceeded to the Chesapeake Bay to resume preparation for Japan. America's newest steam clipper, USS Princeton, was scheduled to rendezvous with the Mississippi off Annapolis. Under Commander Sydney Smith Lee, the older brother of the U.S. Army engineer Robert E. Lee, the Princeton was scheduled to accompany the Mississippi to Japan. Within sight of Perry's flagship, the Princeton ran aground on a mud bank. The Mississippi went to her assistance. Between Annapolis and Norfolk, the Princeton's new steam boilers failed twice, the new engines possibly damaged on the mud bank. Examiners at the Norfolk Navy Yard declared the boilers unfit. Commodore Perry immediately left for Washington seeking a replacement ship.

The USS Powhatan was recalled from the Home Squadron and assigned to Perry's East India Squadron. Perry would not wait; the Mississippi would depart immediately and the Powhatan would follow when available.

On the morning of 24 November 1852, Captain McCluney had Mississippi steam up, ready to depart for the China Sea when Perry ordered him to remain in Norfolk. McCluney was ordered to command of the Powhatan immediately upon arrival. Commander S. S. Lee of the abandoned Princeton took command of the Mississippi.

Six hours later, underway from Hampton Roads, the Mississippi stopped for all hands to cheer the departure of their popular captain who had led the Mississippi since commissioning.

A last-minute transfer of command would seem unprecedented except: Commodore Perry, aside from the Japan expedition, was called the "Father of the Steam Navy." He led the transition from sail-to-steam widely resisted by Navy traditionalists. Perry considered a fleet of modern steamers essential to the impression he planned to make in Japan. He had contributed to the design of the steamer Princeton and personally selected Lee to command her. But after the Princeton's poor performance in Chesapeake Bay, Perry may have had reservations about Commander Lee's enthusiasm for steam, or his experience to command the Powhatan when she arrived. Though it would seem exceptional to replace a senior captain with a junior commander, the Mississippi had multiple experienced commanders. In addition to Perry, Henry A. Adams, designated Captain of the Fleet was aboard and the competent Mississippi crew had trained under McCluney for almost a year.

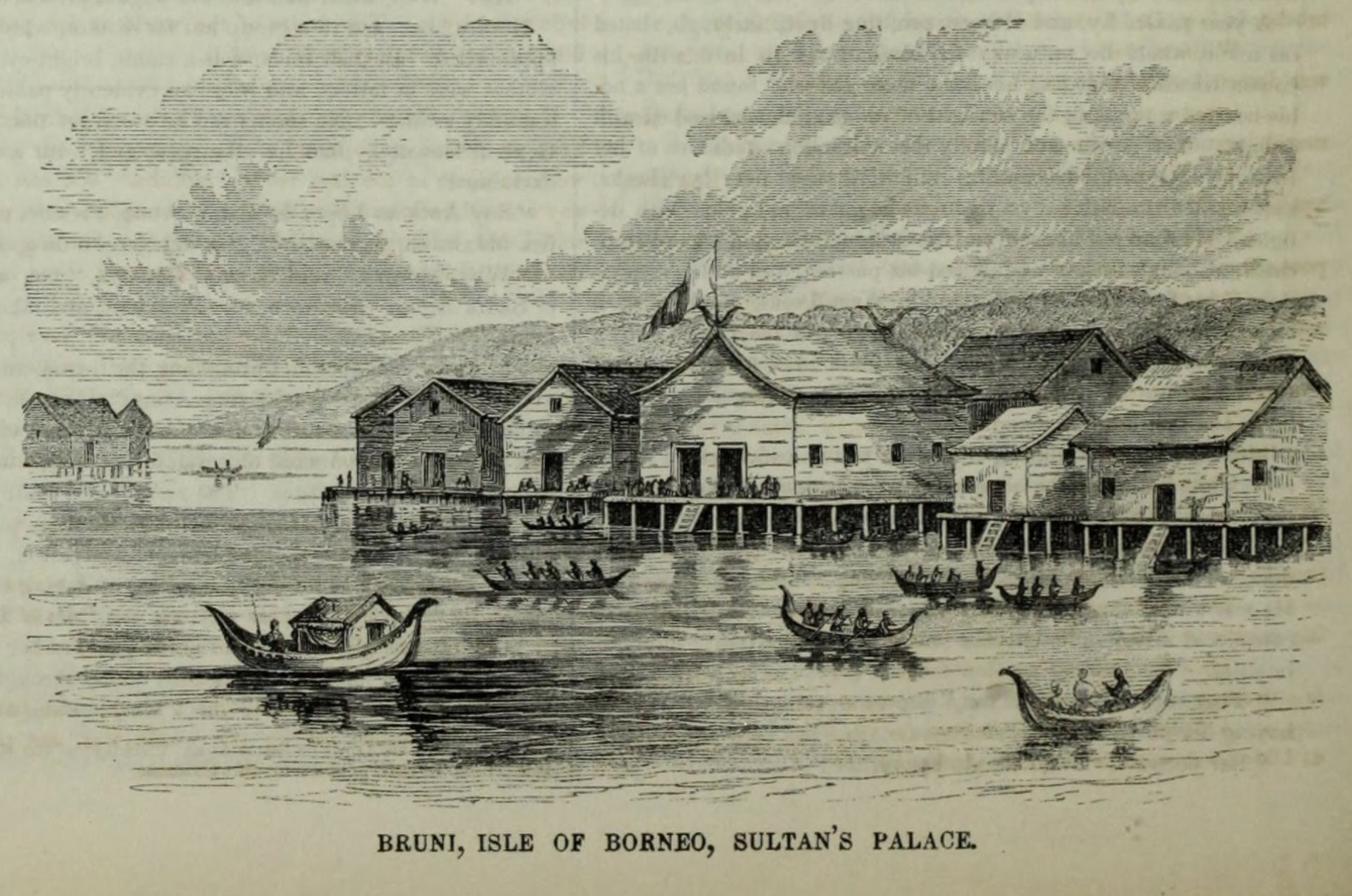
Drawn by an officer of the Powhatan 11 July 1853, this illustration of the "Sulton's Palace" Bruni, Borneo was published in Boston in 1855. Capt. McCluney and a delegation rowed 30 miles upstream to the ratification ceremony between the United States and the Sultan.

Perry apparently had confidence in McCluney to get the steamer Powhatan to the East Indies without supervision.

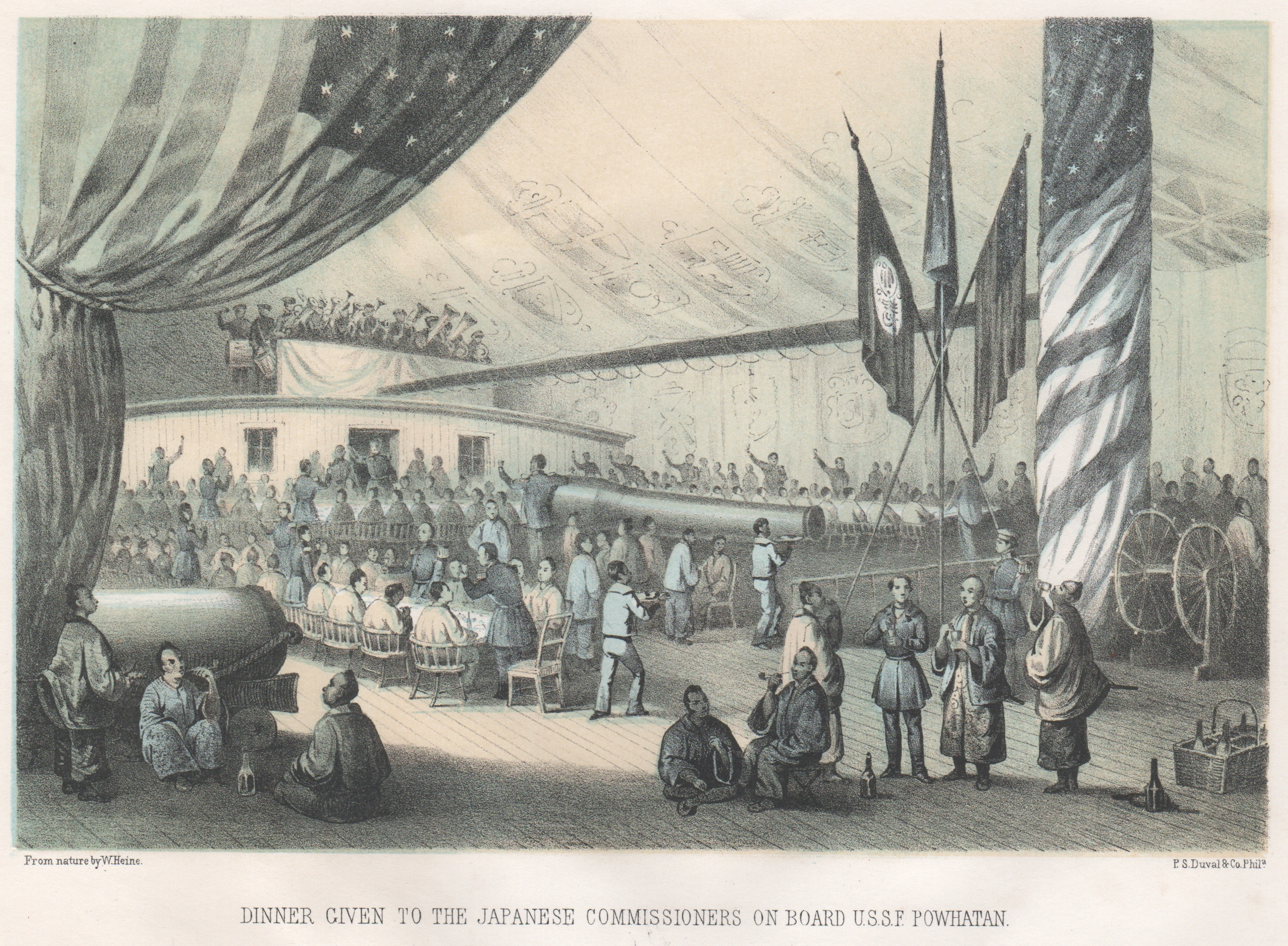
Dinner and "minstrel" entertainment on deck of the USS Powhatan arranged by Capt. Wm. McCluney for the Japanese delegation. The Japanese Commissioners dined below deck with Commodore Perry and the captains of the US expeditionary fleet.

Perry's confidence seems justified. Upon Powhatan's return to Norfolk, McCluney had her refitted, re-provisioned, and underway by 13 February 1853. In the two-week passage to Madeira, the Powhatan caught fire twice. Early steam frigates were sailing ships with auxiliary steam engines, not engineered for continuous steam power. Exhaust stacks overheated the surrounding structures, setting them ablaze. The fires were controlled without serious threat to crew or ship. Rather than delay or return to a navy yard, McCluney's engineers redesigned the exhaust system. With copper purchased in Funchal, capital of Portugal's Madeira archipelago, and re-rigging for sail, the Powhatan's engineers modified the boilers while underway in the South Atlantic. The Powhatan rounded the Cape of Good Hope, crossed the Indian Ocean, and arrived in Hong Kong under full steam.

=== Borneo Enroute ===
Before sailing, President Fillmore again cast naval officers in the dual role of diplomatic officers, empowering Captain McCluney to finalize ratification of a "'Convention of Peace, Friendship, and good Understanding' between the United States and His Highness the Sultan of Borneo."

Following Senate consent, Fillmore signed the treaty 31 January 1853 and empowered McCluney as United States representative to Borneo the next day. The Powhatan sailed twelve days later and arrived off Borneo in the South China Sea in July. Anchoring offshore, a delegation of officers and crew rowed thirty miles upriver to the capital of Bruni for a ratification ceremony at the Sultan's Palace Monday, 11 July 1853. In 2021, the treaty was still in effect, one of longest lasting agreements in U.S. diplomatic history.

=== Perry's flagship - again ===
Upon rendezvous with the East India Squadron that now included ten ships and more than 1,600 men, Commodore Perry transferred his flag to the Powhatan for final negotiations with the Japanese.

Under Perry's orders, McCluney prepared the Powhatan for a celebratory dinner for the Japanese commissioners. Monday, 27 March 1854, a giant awning covered the Powhatan's deck. Flags of both nations flew for the Japanese guests and the American hosts. The commissioners were entertained by Perry and his captains in the commodore's cabin. The rest of the Japanese officials and guests were entertained with an American minstrel performance on deck.

On Friday, 31 March 1854, Perry and the Commissioners signed the Japanese-American agreement, called the Convention of Kanagawa. With no translators fluent in both Japanese and English, the agreement was completed in multiple languages - English, Japanese, Chinese, and Dutch.

Perry and part of the East India Squadron returned to the United States. McCluney and the Powhatan remained on East Indies station in support of American interests in China and elsewhere.

=== Battle of Ty-Ho Bay ===
Off Hong Kong, McCluney assisted the British warships HMS Rattler and HMS Eaglet in recovering merchant vessels taken by Chinese pirates. The captured merchant vessels were located in Ty-Ho (also called Tai-ho or Tai O) Bay with a fleet of junks manned by an estimated 1,500 pirates. The bay was too shallow for either British or American warships. The Rattler and Powhatan launched small armed boats for action against the pirates. Powhatan Marine First Lieutenant James H. Jones led 26 American marines along with seven American officers and 66 sailors. Rattler provided a comparable force. The joint British-American assault rescued the merchant vessels, captured or destroyed most of the pirate fleet, and killed or captured most of the pirate force. The Powhatan lost five killed and six wounded. The Rattler had comparable losses.

See main article: Battle of Ty-ho Bay

== Return to United States ==
McCluney and the Powhatan returned to Norfolk on Valentine's Day, 14 February 1856, three years and one day from departure. Immediately, McCluney was ordered to command of the Norfolk Navy Yard because of the death of Vice Commodore McKeever. Apparently, McCluney declined the command, having been absent from his wife and six-year-old daughter for nearly four years. The order was rescinded eleven days later and McCluney was granted leave.

=== Stevens' Battery ===
An early adopter of steam power, McCluney in 1857 was assigned special duty to Stevens' Battery—the war steamer project. The project intended development of the first iron clad, steam powered, war ship. The war steamer was the brainchild of Robert L. Stevens and Edwin A. Stevens, engineers and inventors of Hoboken, New Jersey.

Perhaps McCluney accepted the assignment to be near home in Brooklyn, but he was an advocate of both steam power and naval innovation. His practical contribution seems to have been the need for effective ventilation of the enclosed, armored gun room. The Navy attempted to scrap the project; traditionalists were never fond of steam and actively opposed iron warships — until the Civil War.

When the Civil War began, inventor John Ericsson adapted, some say copied, many of the Stevens' brothers innovations into the design for the USS Monitor. Rushed to completion, the Monitor became the first working ironclad. The Stevens Project was abandoned. The Battle of the Monitor and Merrimac (renamed CSA Virginia), in Hampton Roads, ended the era of wooden ships and changed naval warfare.

McCluney was detached from the project well before the war. On 30 December 1858 he was assigned command of the Home Squadron.

See main article: Stevens Battery

=== Home Squadron and Japanese Embassy ===
McCluney sailed from New York in January 1859 for what was then called Aspinwall (Colon, Panama). He assumed command of the Home and West India Squadron and when the USS Roanoke arrived, he hoisted his flag aboard the giant steam frigate. As commander-in-chief of the fleet, McCluney was referred to with the honorific "Commodore" though the navy had no such rank.

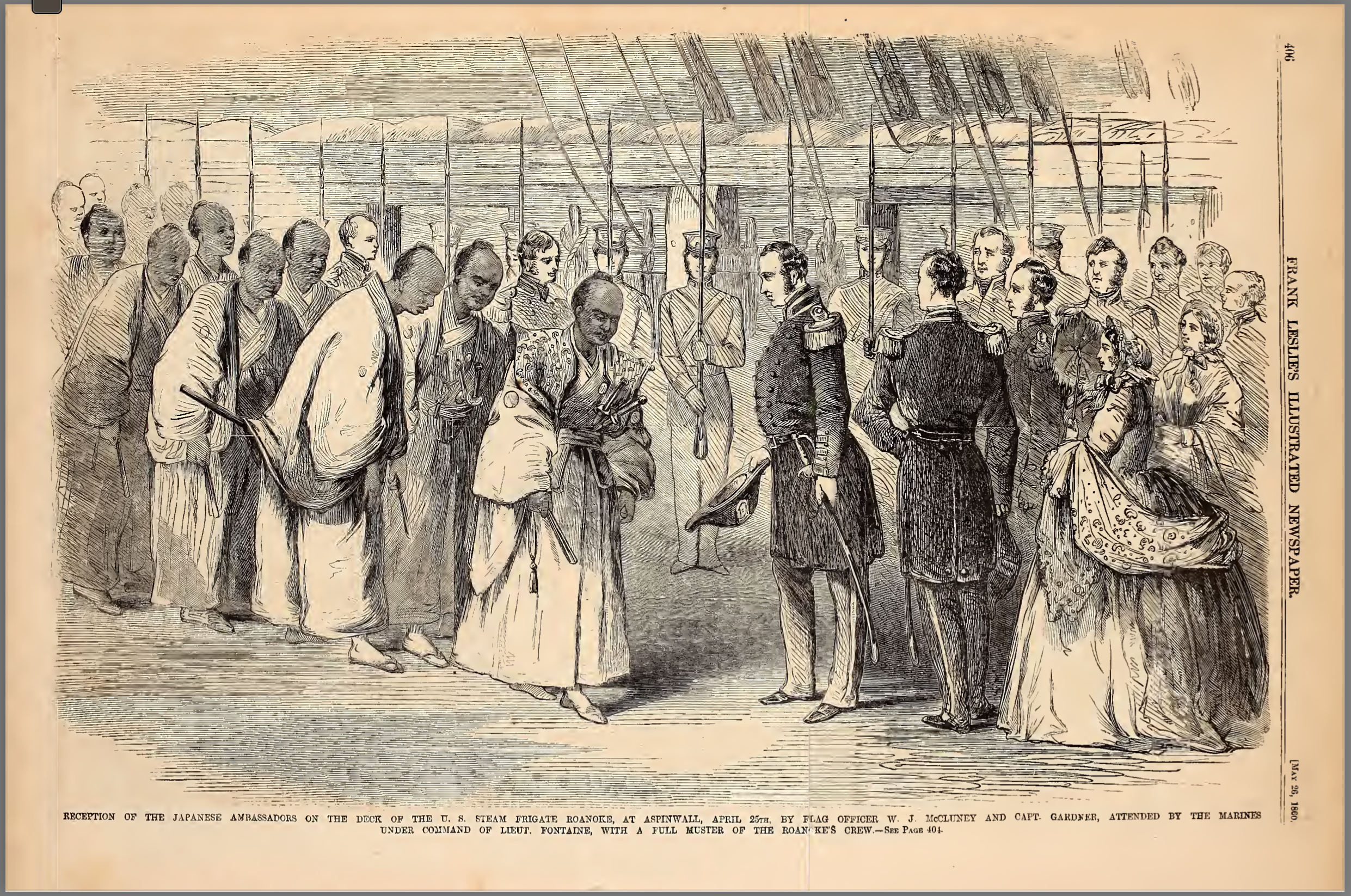
Commodore McCluney greets the Japanese Ambassadors aboard his flagship, USS Roanoke, upon their arrival at Aspinwall, Panama 25 April 1860. Leslie's Illustrated Newspaper, May 26, 1860.

McCluney may not have known initially that negotiations for a comprehensive treaty with Japan following Perry's and McCluney's expedition four years earlier were concluding. The Japanese intended to send a full embassy to the United States to present the final Treaty of Friendship, Commerce, and Navigation to President Buchanan in person.

U.S. State Department and Navy planners had decided senior officers with Japanese experience should host the delegation. They planned to transport the Japanese Embassy across the Pacific in the Powhatan, stop in San Francisco, then south to Panama. The delegation would traverse the isthmus by train. McCluney and the Roanoke would then transport them to New York.

The Roanoke waited off the unhealthy coast of Panama for more than a year. McCluney's correspondence is filled with notices of death, illness, and reassignment of officers and crew for reasons of health. McCluney's health deteriorated as well.

The Japanese reached Aspinwall and boarded the Roanoke 25 April 1860. Commodore McCluney greeted the delegation with full honors and entertained the principal ambassadors, Shinmi Masaoki (新見正興), Muragaki Norimasa (村垣範正), and Oguri Tadamasa (小栗忠順) as Perry had in 1854 when McCluney commanded the Powhatan. Ambassadors, embassy staff, and servants numbered more than seventy and were accommodated in special quarters McCluney had erected on deck. The Roanoke departed 26 April and arrived in 13-days off Sandy Hook for New York.

On 9 May, McCluney sent a complete list of the seventy-two-member Japanese delegation's full names and titles to the secretary in preparation for their arrival. Immediately a pilot returned with orders to divert the Roanoke from New York to Hampton Roads. President James Buchanan had changed his mind. New York had appropriated $30,000 for the Japanese reception and newspapers were critical of Buchanan's last minute decision to receive the Japanese in Washington instead of New York.

On the evening of 12 May, the Roanoke arrived in Hampton Roads. The Chesapeake was too shallow for the Roanoke to navigate to the District of Columbia. McCluney toasted the ambassadors "...on the safe arrival at the gates of Washington." The ambassadors presented McCluney with a long sword in appreciation of his courtesies. McCluney thanked them for the blade and complimented the Japanese for "...the finest steel in the world."

The Japanese embassy transferred to a shallow draft bay steamer for the short trip to Washington. McCluney sent a telegram announcing the ambassadors imminent arrival, and a hand written note to the secretary asking to be relieved of command for reasons of health. He was relieved on 20 May.

See the main article: Japanese Embassy to the United States

== Retirement and funeral ==
The secretary granted a leave of three months; however, McCluney's health did not improve. He never returned to active duty. McCluney retired 21 December 1861. Six months later he was promoted to the newly created rank of commodore. Abraham Lincoln signed his commission.

McCluney died at home in Brooklyn 11 February 1864. His funeral included a procession to Green-Wood Cemetery of admirals, commodores, and captains, an honor guard of 200 Marines, the Navy Band, and the officers and men of the Naval Academy Training Ship Savannah. Pall bearers included his old colleague from the Mexican-American War, now Rear Admiral Francis Gregory, along with the commandant of the New York Navy Yard, Rear Admiral Hiram Paulding, and Commodore William Radford, Captain Richard Worsam Meade II, Captain F. B. Ellison, Captain Charles S. Boggs, and Captain Thomas Tingey Craven.

After McCluney's death, his widow, Elizabeth, and 13-year-old daughter, Arabella, relocated to Philadelphia. In 1892 the commodore was reinterred to Laurel Hill Cemetery, Philadelphia, buried alongside his deceased daughter, Deborah. Elizabeth died 3 July 1896 and was buried with the commodore.
