= Saranac =

Saranac may refer to a place name in the United States:

- Saranac, Michigan, a village

New York

- Saranac, New York, a town in Clinton County
- Saranac Lake, New York, a large village in Franklin and Essex counties
- Upper Saranac Lake
- Middle Saranac Lake
- Lower Saranac Lake
- The Saranac Inn at Upper Saranac Lake
- The Saranac River, a river in New York state

Other uses

- USS Saranac, the name of four ships
- Saranac Beer, brewed by the Matt Brewing Company
