= 1854 expedition to Coulan =

Anti-Piracy expedition

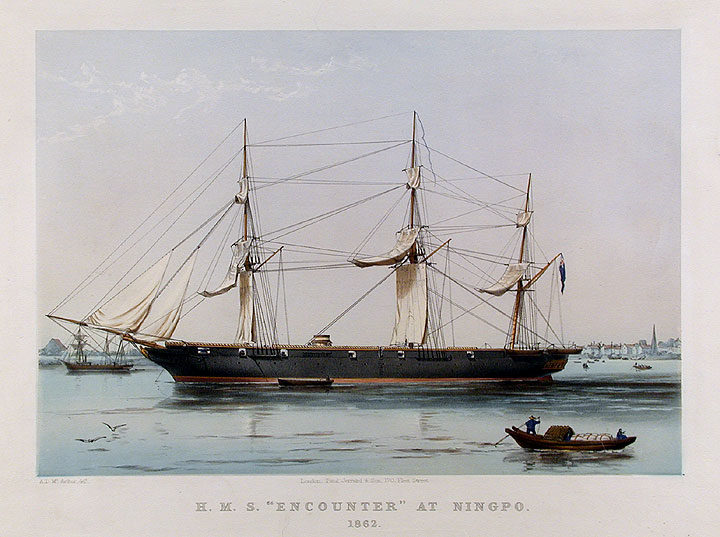
- HMS Encounter
Date	Mid-November 1854
Location	Coulan Bay, Pearl River Delta
Result	Coalition victory

Belligerents
United Kingdom; Qing dynasty Kingdom of Portugal; United States	Chinese pirates

Commanders and leaders
(United Kingdom) Douglas O’Callaghan; Zhang Yutang; Eduardo Scarnichia (United States) George Henry Preble	Unknown

Strength
1,000 troops 3 warships 3 steamships	Unknown

Casualties and losses
1 killed	50–60 killed 13 captured 53 junks destroyed 50 guns captured

The 1854 expedition to Coulan was an international naval campaign in mid-November 1854 against Chinese pirates in Coulan Bay, in the Pearl River Delta. Under the command of British Captain Douglas O’Callaghan, the coalition destroyed three batteries and 53 junks, marking a high point in anti-piracy cooperation prior to the Second Opium War.

== Background ==
In early October 1854, Chinese pirates attacked the Chilean barque Caldera after it was dismasted in a typhoon. The crew and passengers, including British Captain Matthew Rooney and Frenchwoman Fanny Loviot were captured. Upon hearing of Loviot's capture, George L. Haskell, the French vice-consul in Hong Kong, requested British assistance. Captain William Hoste of HMS Spartan dispatched Lieutenant Palliser with 85 crew aboard the steamer Ann to rescue her, with additional orders to destroy the town of Coulan and obtain information about the plundering of the Caldera. Hoste noted:

There can be no doubt Coulan is the stronghold of a large piratical fleet… [They] commit great depredations… [and] detach small parties to plunder in this neighbourhood who carry their booty to Coulan, where they consider themselves impregnable.

Palliser's force burned the villages of Coo-choo-mee, but upon entering Coulan Bay, he found his forces insufficient to confront the pirate junks and batteries. Even so, a Chinese report credited Palliser's expedition with "destroying over ten pirate junks [and] killing over one hundred pirates", noting that the remainder ran aground and were captured by official cruisers from Xiangshan. Because neither British nor Qing forces could handle the Coulan pirates alone, closer cooperation, both with each other and with other nations, became necessary.

Rear-Admiral James Stirling contacted Ye Mingchen, the governor-general of Guangdong and Guangxi, to urge action against piracy. When Ye admitted he lacked the necessary naval fleet, Stirling offered to send a British expedition. After receiving sanction through Consul Robertson, Stirling gained Ye's support despite his mistrust of the British, who sent Dapeng Colonel Zhang Yutang and a war junk to join the fleet.

Others also supported Stirling's measure. The governor of Macau, Isidoro Francisco Guimarães, sent the armed lorcha Amazona under Senior Lieutenant João Eduardo Scarnichia, manned by three midshipmen, eleven soldiers and thirty sailors. Commodore David Geisinger sent the USN Queen, a steamship chartered by the United States Navy, under Lieutenant George Henry Preble. Chinese merchants raised $5,000 to charter the P&O steamers Canton and Sir Charles Forbes to support the British fleet, consisting of HMS Barracouta, Encounter, and Styx, along with boats from HMS Winchester and Spartan. A truly international force had been assembled.

== Expedition ==
In mid-November 1854, the expedition set out for Coulan under command of Captain George William Douglas O’Callaghan of HMS Encounter. A Chinese witness reported that the fleet carried over 1,000 troops across three warships and three steamships. Along the way, the fleet searched three suspicious junks, which were subsequently burned. That evening, the flotilla blockaded Coulan.

The next morning, 12 November, a landing force went ashore, transported by boats from the British and American ships under the direct protection of the Amazona. When they approached the shore, the Amazona intensely bombarded the pirate ships, leaving them severely battered and allowing the landing to take place without difficulty. The China Mail reported that 340 men landed: 280 British, 25 Portuguese, 20 Chinese, and 15 Americans. They "destroyed 3 batteries, and some villages at Coulan". Captain O’Callaghan further reported the destruction of fifty junks and the capture of fifty guns. He estimated that fifty to sixty pirates were killed, and thirteen prisoners were captured and handed over to Zhang. The coalition's only serious casualty was Morrison, an American seaman who was shot in the head.

== Aftermath ==
Reports indicate that as the British and American ships were returning to Hong Kong after the battle, they passed by the Amazona and saluted her with enthusiastic cheers.

The Coulan expedition marked a high point of anti-piracy cooperation prior to the Second Opium War. It extended a collaborative imperial network well beyond Hong Kong's maritime jurisdiction to include Portuguese and American forces. The China Mail celebrated it as a phenomenon of the age, seeing English, American, Portuguese, and Chinese forces working hand in hand against a common enemy. Macau's government gazette praised the actions of the Amazona and Senior Lieutenant João Eduardo Scarnichia, who was promoted for distinguished service. Governor-General Ye wrote to John Bowring, the new governor of Hong Kong, that the expedition was "sufficient evidence of Britain's sincere designs against a common foe".

Though these celebrations may have been premature, as British and American forces would have to return for another joint expedition nine months later, the voyage reflected an increased willingness toward cooperation.

== See also ==
- Battle of Muddy Flat

== Bibliography ==
- Kwan, C. Nathan (June 2020). The Anglo-Qing Suppression of Piracy in South China (PDF) (PhD thesis). King's College London.
- Saturnino Monteiro, Armando da Silva (1997). Batalhas e Combates da Marinha Portuguesa (1808-1975) (in Portuguese). Vol. VIII. Lisbon: Livraria Sá da Costa. ISBN 972-562-332-0.
- Sellick, Douglas R. G. (2010). Pirate Outrages: True Stories of Terror on the China Seas. Fremantle Press. ISBN 9781921696077.
