= Battle of Ty-ho Bay =

Naval engagement in 1855 against Chinese pirates

Coordinates: 22.2672°N 113.8503°E

- A model of an eight gun pirate junk.
Date	August 4, 1855
Location	Off Tai O, Hong Kong
Result	Coalition victory

Belligerents
United Kingdom; United States; Kingdom of Portugal	Chinese Pirates

Commanders and leaders
(United Kingdom) William Fellowes (United States) William McCluney; José da Silva Carvalho	Unknown

Strength
1 steamer 1 sloop 1 screw frigate ~6 armed boats sailors and marines	36 war-junks

Casualties and losses
9 killed ~6 wounded	~500 killed or wounded ~1,000 captured 20 war-junks sunk
- Seven captured merchant ships were liberated by the British and Americans during the battle, two sustained heavy damage and were burned.

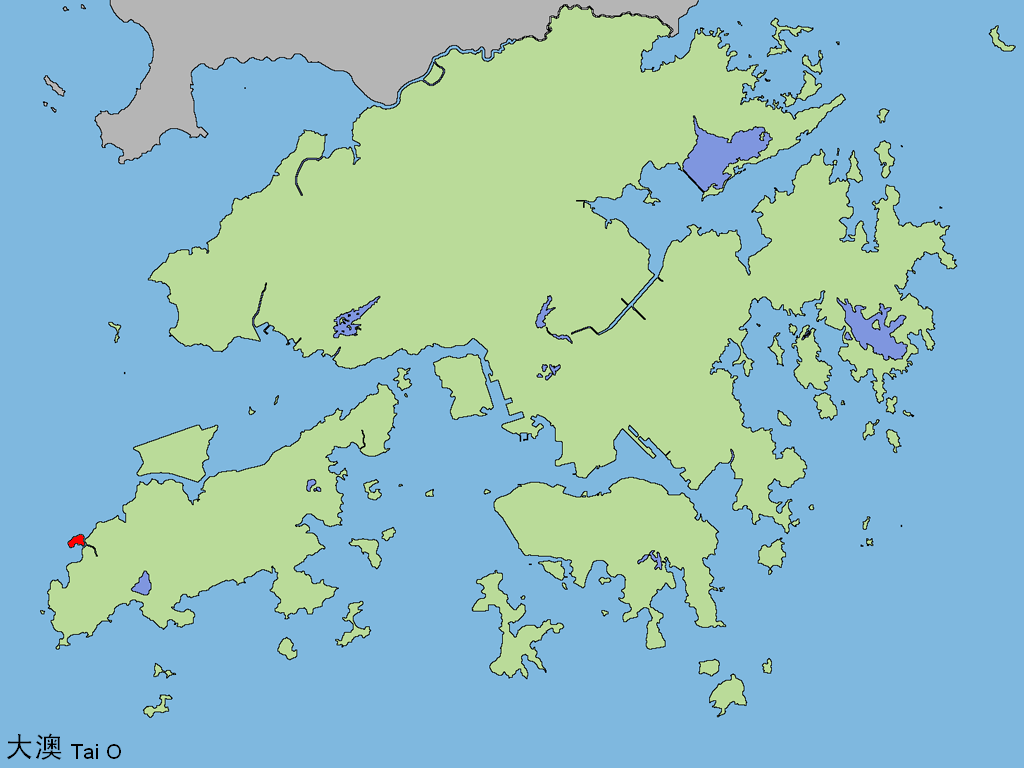
Location of Tai O within Hong Kong.

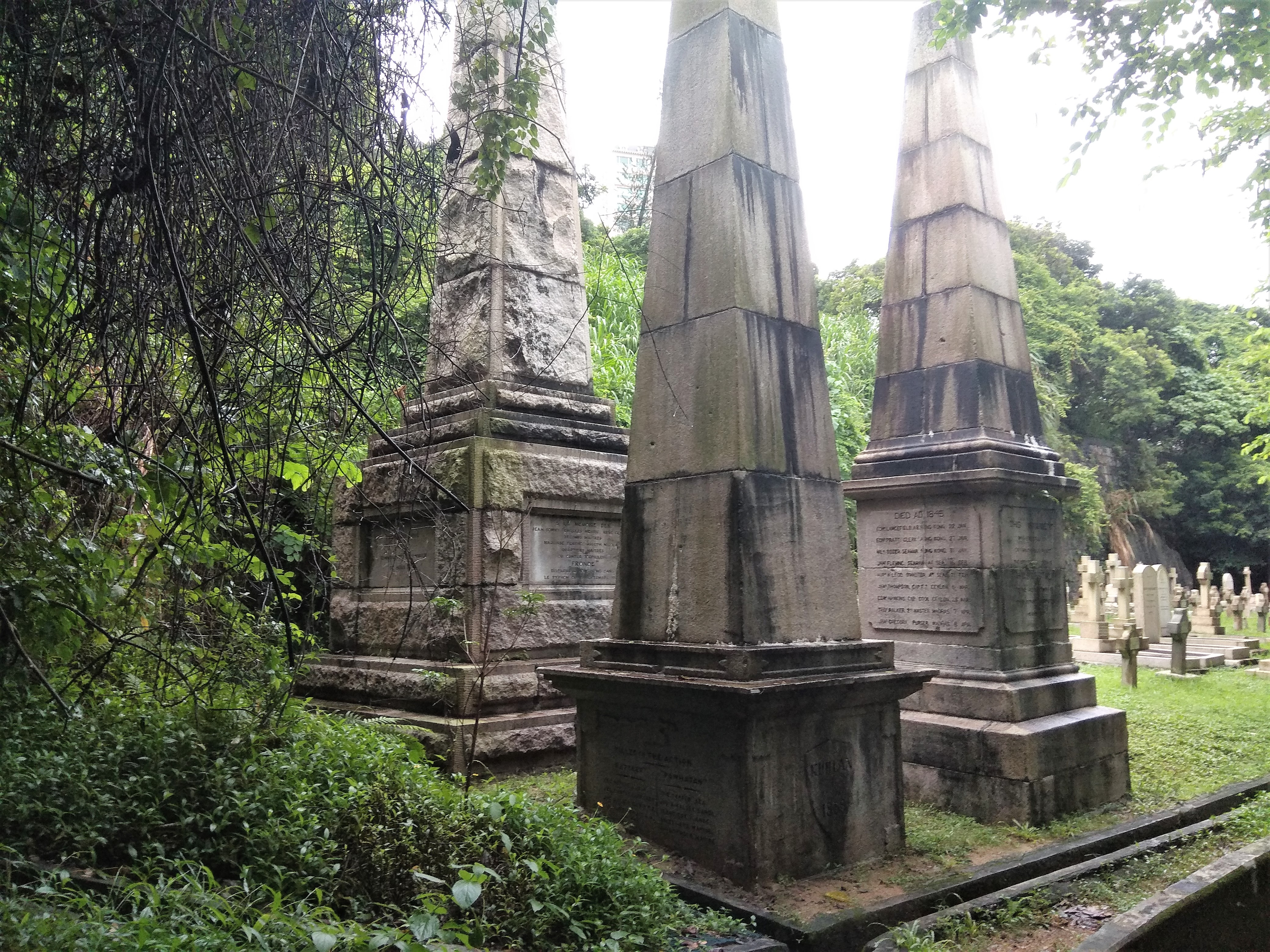
Kuhlan Monument (centre) in Hong Kong Cemetery, commemorating the battle. The obelisk on the left is the Fronde Memorial. The one on the right is the HMS Vestal Memorial, commemorating officers and crew of HMS Vestal who died between 1844 and 1847.

The Battle of Ty-ho Bay was a significant naval engagement in 1855 involving the United Kingdom, the United States, and Portugal against Chinese pirates. The action off Tai O, Hong Kong was to rescue captured merchant vessels, held by a fleet of armed war-junks. The coalition forces defeated the pirates in one of the last major battles between Chinese pirate fleets and western navies. It was also one of the first joint operations undertaken by British and American forces.

== Background ==
Unlike the Atlantic Ocean where piracy was largely ended by 1830, piracy in Asia and the Pacific continued to thrive as it had for centuries. Chinese and Japanese pirates constantly fought each other throughout China's coastal regions. Hundreds of pirate hideouts existed along the Chinese coast by 1855. This prompted western naval forces to fight them when they attacked shipping. In September 1855, the pirates of Kuhlan seized four merchant vessels escorted by the paddle steamer HMS Eaglet. The Royal Navy sloop-of-war HMS Rattler was sent to rescue the merchantmen.

HMS Rattler found the pirates in Kuhlan Harbor. When shallow water prevented her from attacking, she left to seek aid from the Eaglet and USS Powhatan, a sidewheel steam frigate of the East India Squadron commanded by Commodore William J. McCluney. Powhatan later played a significant role during the American Civil War. Rattler was commanded by Commodore William Fellowes and was manned by 180 officers and crew. The number of crew and armament of Eaglet is unknown. She was originally a civil vessel chartered for British naval service between 1855 and 1857, to tow British vessels through shallow water.

== Battle ==
On August 4, the steamer Eaglet arrived at Ty-ho Bay, she was towing at least six boats of different types, filled with British and American sailors and marines. Each boat was armed with a howitzer or cannon. The British first spotted a merchant junk that appeared to be fleeing the bay, so the pinnace of the Rattler and the cutter of the Powhatan were sent to cut the junk out. Minutes later, when the pinnace and cutter disappeared from sight, the remaining British and American vessels sighted the pirate fleet, which included fourteen large junks and twenty-two smaller ones. Some 1,500 pirates crewed the vessels and they were armed with small cannons. Also in the bay were seven captured merchant ships, most of which were Chinese junks. When the Chinese sighted the approaching enemy, half of the pirate junks began to flee while the other remained behind to engage.

The pirates began a heavy fire on the British and Americans but most of the shot was not well directed and passed over the Eaglet and the armed boats. When the expedition was in range the boats started their return fire and six junks were sunk at this time. When the range decreased to close quarters, Eaglet detached the boats and they went off to board the junks. Fourteen were taken with heavy resistance and were burned just after. The seven merchant ships were also liberated but two were heavily damaged in the battle and subsequently burned as well. As result of the action, fourteen larger junks were destroyed along with six small ones while sixteen others escaped.

An estimated 500 pirates were killed in action, drowned, or were wounded. Around 1,000 pirates were taken prisoner. American casualties consisted of six wounded with five dead out of about 100 men, the dead were crewmen John Pepper, James A. Halsey, Isaac Coe, Landsman, S. Mullard and B. F. Addamson. The British suffered several wounded and four men killed, officer George Mitchell, and crewmen James Silvers, John Massey, and M. Oliff. The battle is largely forgotten but a monument was erected at Happy Valley in commemoration, it was later moved to Hong Kong Cemetery.

== See also ==
- 1854 expedition to Coulan
- Battle of Fatshan Creek
- First and Second Opium War
