= USS Powhatan (1850) =

Ship

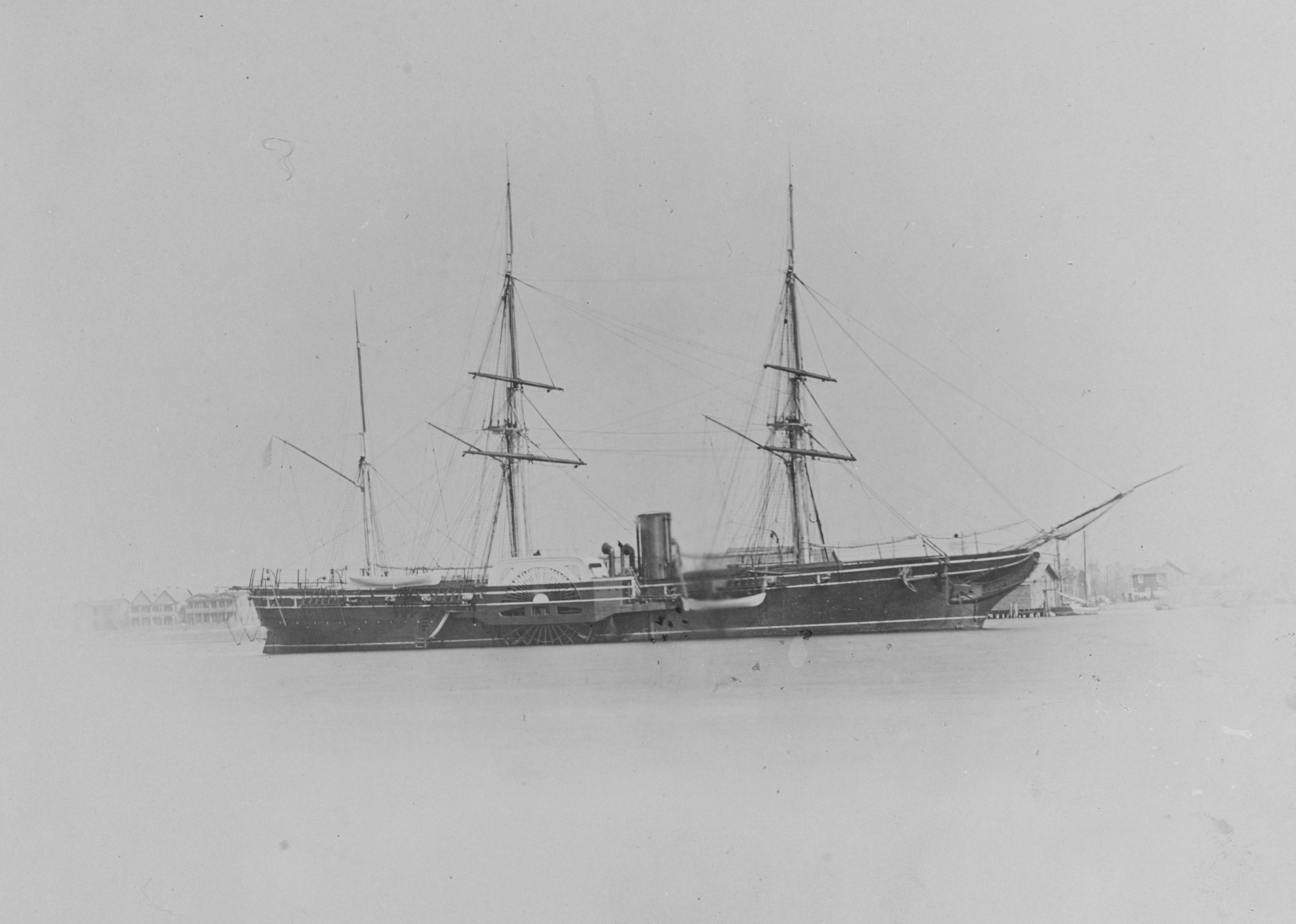
- USS Powhatan

History

United States
- Name: USS Powhatan
- Namesake: Powatan
- Builder: Norfolk Naval Shipyard, Portsmouth, Virginia
- Cost: $785,000
- Laid down: 6 August 1847
- Launched: 14 February 1850
- Commissioned: 2 September 1852
- Decommissioned: 2 June 1886
- Fate: Scrapped, 5 August 1887

General characteristics
- Type: steam frigate
- Tonnage: 2415
- Displacement: 3,765 long tons (3,825 t)
- Length: 253 ft 8 in (77.32 m)
- Beam: 45 ft (14 m)
- Draft: 18 ft 6 in (5.64 m)
- Propulsion: Steam engine, 1,500 hp (1,119 kW), side paddlewheels
- Speed: 11 knots (20 km/h; 13 mph)
- Complement: 289 officers and enlisted
- Armament: 1 × 11 in (280 mm) Dahlgren smoothbore gun; 10 × 9 in (230 mm) Dahlgren smoothbore guns; 5 × 12-pounder guns (5.4 kg)

The first USS Powhatan was a sidewheel steam frigate in the United States Navy during the American Civil War. She was named for Powhatan, a Native American chief of eastern Virginia. She was one of the last, and largest, of the United States Navy's paddle frigates.

Powhatan was built by Samuel Hartt and her keel was laid on 6 August 1847 at Norfolk Naval Shipyard, then Gosport Shipyard, at Portsmouth, Virginia. Her engines were constructed by Mehaffy & Company. She cost $785,000. She was launched on 14 February 1850 by the Norfolk Navy Yard and commissioned on 2 September 1852, Captain William Mervine in command.

== Service history ==
=== Home Squadron, 1852 ===
After shakedown out of the Norfolk Navy Yard, Powhatan joined the Home Squadron as flagship of Commodore John T. Newton and sailed for New York where she was visited by the Secretary of the Navy, John P. Kennedy. She departed New York on 16 October 1852 for Vera Cruz with the new Minister to Mexico, Judge Alfred Conkling, on board and returned to Norfolk on 27 November via Havana and Pensacola.

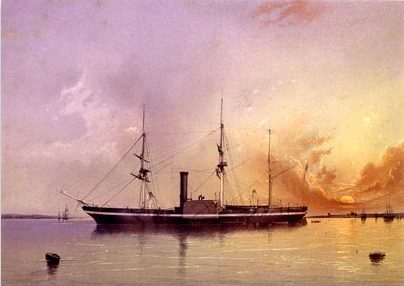
Powhatan

=== East India Squadron, 1853–1860 ===
Powhatan, under Comdr. William J. McCluney, was next assigned to the East India Squadron and arrived on station via Cape of Good Hope on 15 June 1853. Her arrival in Chinese waters coincided with an important phase of Commodore Matthew C. Perry's expedition to open commercial relations with the Japanese. She was Perry's flagship during his November visit to Whampoa. On 14 February 1854 she entered Edo Bay with the rest of the squadron, remaining until the Convention of Kanagawa was signed on 31 March 1854 as part of Perry's show of force. After the signing of the treaty, the squadron moved to Shimoda, one of the ports opened by the treaty and the site of a future American consulate to conduct surveying operations. While at Shimoda, Yoshida Shoin came aboard and unsuccessfully requested to be taken to the United States.

During August 1855, Powhatan accompanied HMS Rattler in a successful battle against Chinese pirates off Kowloon, and reached the U.S. on 14 February 1856 with the new treaty.

The US-Japan Treaty of Amity and Commerce was signed on her deck on 29 July 1858 (19 June in the old Japanese calendar).

The U.S. Minister, Gen. Ward came to Penang on the steamer Ganges and was transferred to the Powhatan for his journey onto Pekin in May 1859. The American government also at the same time chartered the steamer Hong Kong accompany Ward into the north and to return the remains of Ye Mingchen's for interment in Canton, 13 May 1859.

On 13 February 1860, the Powhatan accompanied by a Japanese capital ship, Kanrin Maru that departed on 9 February (18 January in the old Japanese calendar), left Yokohama, Japan, en route to San Francisco as part of the first official embassy of the Empire of Japan to the United States of America. The Japanese embassy was formally composed of three men: Ambassador Shinmi Masaoki (新見正興), Vice-Ambassador Muragaki Norimasa (村垣範正), and Observer Oguri Tadamasa (小栗忠順).

=== Civil War, 1860–1865 ===
Powhatan remained active throughout the Civil War. She served as Flag Officer Garrett J. Pendergrast's flagship at Vera Cruz during October 1860. In April 1861, while under the command of Lt. David Dixon Porter, she assisted in the relief of Fort Pickens, Florida. President Abraham Lincoln had attempted to countermand the order sending the Powhatan to Fort Pickens and send the ship to assist in the relief expedition to Fort Sumter instead, but because Secretary of State William H. Seward signed the order "Seward" rather than "Lincoln," the order was not obeyed. The Powhatan assisted in the establishment of the blockade of Mobile, Alabama on 26 May, capturing schooner Mary Clinton on 29 May. During July and August Powhatan joined the blockade of the Southwest Pass of the Mississippi River, retaking schooner Abby Bradford on 15 August. From late August to October she pursued CSS Sumter throughout much of the West Indies.

Powhatan operated off Charleston, South Carolina from October 1862 to August 1863, captured schooner Major E. Willis on 19 April and sloop C. Routereau on 16 May, and deployed for a second time to the West Indies from November 1863 to September 1864 as flagship of Rear Admiral James L. Lardner. She participated in the successful reduction of Fort Fisher, 24–25 December 1864 and in its capture on 13–15 January 1865.

=== South Pacific Squadron, 1866–1869 ===
After the war, in October 1865, she sailed from Boston with Tuscarora and Vanderbilt, escorting monitor USS Monadnock to California via Cape Horn. She arrived at San Francisco on 22 June 1866.

Powhatan was the flagship of the South Pacific Squadron 1866–1869, commanded by Rear Admiral John A. Dahlgren from 12 December 1866 to 14 July 1868. In March 1866 she was sent to Valparaíso to protect U.S. interests during the Chincha Islands War.

On 13 August 1868, Powhatah sustained damaged to one of her paddle wheels at Callao, Peru during the Arica earthquake.

=== North Atlantic Squadron, 1869–1886 ===
From 1869 to 1886, she was attached to the North Atlantic Squadron and was flagship from 15 September 1869 until 30 December 1870. On 24 August 1873, Powhatan was caught in a storm at Halifax, Nova Scotia, Canada. She was driven from her moorings at the Cunard wharf across to the ordnance wharf. She served as flagship again from 4 July 1877 until 10 December 1879. During this period, three Powhatan crewman earned the Medal of Honor for rescuing fellow sailors from drowning: Landsman George W. Cutter at Norfolk, Virginia, on 27 May 1872; Seaman Joseph B. Noil at Norfolk on 26 December 1872; and Coxswain William Anderson on 28 June 1878.

In 1877, the ship was ordered to Baltimore, Maryland along with the Swatara, on a peacekeeping mission following the city's riots, which occurred as part of the Great Railroad Strike of 1877.

The ship ended her long and conspicuous career by making numerous cruises in Cuban waters to protect American commerce: July–August 1880, February–May 1882, January–May 1883, January–May 1885, and January–February 1886. Powhatan was decommissioned on 2 June 1886 and was sold on 30 July 1886 to Burdette Pond of Meriden, Connecticut, and scrapped 5 August 1887.

== See also ==
- Media related to USS Powhatan (ship, 1852) at Wikimedia Commons
- List of steam frigates of the United States Navy
- Bibliography of early American naval history
- Union Navy
- Union Blockade
- List of United States Navy ships
