= William Anderson (Medal of Honor) =

American sailor and Medal of Honor recipient

- Born: c. 1852; Sweden
- Died: March 11, 1908 (aged 55–56); Brooklyn, New York
- Burial place: Holy Cross Cemetery, Brooklyn
- Military career
- Allegiance: United States of America
- Branch: United States Navy
- Rank: Coxswain
- Unit: USS Powhatan
- Awards: Medal of Honor

William Anderson (c. 1852–1908) was a United States Navy sailor and a recipient of the United States military's highest decoration, the Medal of Honor.

== Biography ==
Born in about 1852 in Sweden, Anderson migrated to the United States and joined the Navy from New York. By June 28, 1878, he was serving as a coxswain on the USS Powhatan. On that day, he rescued First Class Boy William Henry Moffett aka Moffatt from drowning, for which he was awarded the Medal of Honor.

Anderson's official Medal of Honor citation reads:

On board the U.S.S. Powhatan, 28 June 1878. Acting courageously, Anderson rescued from drowning W. H. Moffatt, first class boy.

== See also ==
- List of Medal of Honor recipients in non-combat incidents
