= Stevens Battery =

Unfinished 19th-century U.S. ironclad warship

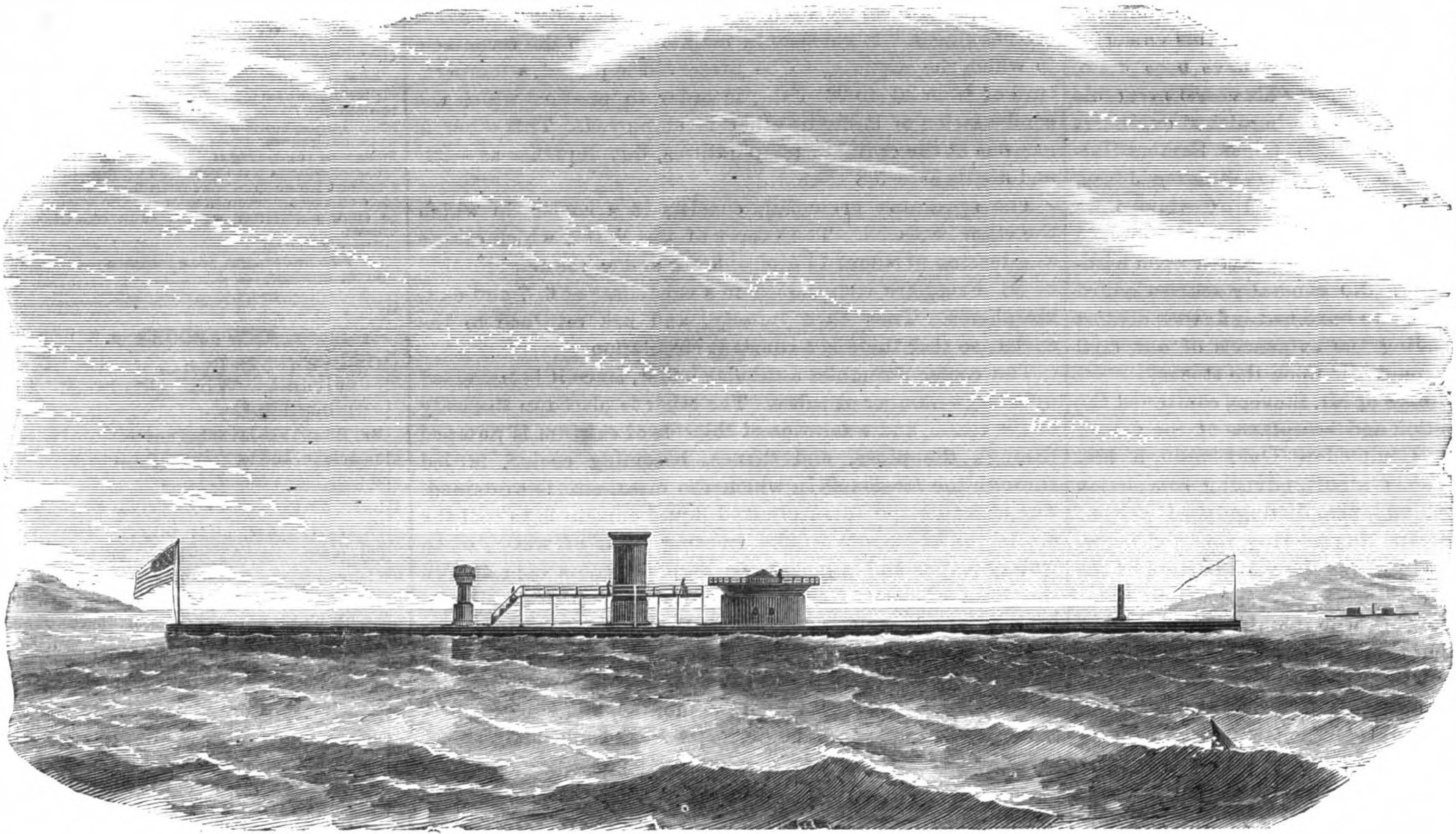
- The Stevens Battery design as of 1874

History

United States
- Name: Stevens Battery
- Namesake: Its designers and builders, Robert L. Stevens and Edwin Augustus Stevens, who proposed the ship in 1841
- Ordered: By Stevens Battery Act of 1841
- Awarded: 1842
- Builder: Construction was at Stevens family estate, Hoboken, New Jersey; 1844 design builders: Robert L. Stevens and Edwin Augustus Stevens; 1854 design builders: Robert L. Stevens and Edwin Augustus Stevens; 1869 design builder: The State of New Jersey; George B. McClellan (engineer-in-charge)
- Cost: Approximately $2,500,000 (USD) spent between 1841 and 1874; approximately $450,000 (USD) additional estimated to be required for launching ship when work ended in 1874
- Laid down: 1854
- Launched: Never
- Completed: Never
- Commissioned: Never
- Fate: Scrapped incomplete 1881

General characteristics (1844 design)
- Type: Semisubmersible ironclad
- Displacement: 1,500 tons
- Length: 250 ft (76.2 m)
- Beam: 40 ft (12.2 m)
- Installed power: 900 ihp (671 kW)
- Propulsion: Steam engine; screw-propelled
- Speed: 18 knots (estimated)
- Armament: 6 x large muzzle-loading cannons
- Armor: 4.5 in (11.4 cm) iron plate plus; 14 in (35.6 cm) locust timber

General characteristics (1854 design)
- Type: Semisubmersible ironclad
- Displacement: 4,683 tons
- Length: 420 ft (128.0 m)
- Beam: 53 ft 0 in (16.2 m)
- Installed power: 8,624 ihp (6,431 kW)
- Propulsion: Eight steam engines, two screws, 1,000 tons coal
- Speed: 20 knots (estimated)
- Armament: 5 × 15-inch (381-mm) smoothbore guns; 2 × 10-inch (254-mm) rifled guns; Ram bow
- Armor: 6.75 in (17.1 cm) iron plate

General characteristics (1869 design)
- Type: Ironclad ram
- Propulsion: Ten large-diameter boilers, two Maudsley and Field vertical overhead-crosshead steam engines, two screws
- Speed: 15 knots (estimated)
- Armament: Never determined
- Armor: 10 in (25.4 cm) iron plate

The Stevens Battery was an early design for a type of ironclad, first proposed in 1841 for use by the United States Navy. A revolutionary design with potential capabilities far beyond the norm for her times, she might have set a new standard in naval design for the time if she had put to sea in the 1840s, 1850s, or 1860s. One full-sized example was begun, but attempts in the following decades to complete the ship to three different designs all failed thanks to extensive construction delays and a lack of funding. Construction finally was abandoned in 1874, and she was sold for scrapping in 1881 without ever being launched.

== Background ==
In 1841, the United States was in the midst of a war scare with the United Kingdom over the American boundary with Canada, among other issues. Americans remembered the British invasion of the United States by sea during the War of 1812 and, to avoid its recurrence, President John Tyler and United States Secretary of the Navy Abel P. Upshur called for a large increase in the size of the United States Navy in order to defend the coast. A like-minded United States Congress authorized the use of US$8,500,000 to fund the expansion.

In this environment, Robert L. Stevens and Edwin Augustus Stevens, the sons of the inventor Colonel John Stevens, proposed to the United States Department of the Navy on August 13, 1841, the construction of a revolutionary steam-powered ironclad vessel of high speed, with screw propellers and all machinery below the waterline. Congress passed and President Tyler signed the Stevens Battery Act the same year to authorize funding for the construction of the ship, and the U.S. Navy's Board of Navy Commissioners approved the Stevens brothers' specific proposal for the ship in January 1842. An act of Congress authorizing Upshur to contract for the construction of a shot- and shell-proof steamer, to be built principally of iron, on the Stevens plan was approved on April 14, 1842. The ship, which became known as the "Stevens Battery," was to be the first such ship ever to be built under United States Government authorization. She was intended to serve as a fast, powerful, heavily armored, mobile battery, reinforcing the coastal fortifications of New York City.

The Stevens brothers selected their family estate in Hoboken, New Jersey, as the construction site for the ship. They had to have a drydock dug out of solid rock there, and then install large pumps to keep the drydock from flooding, and delays occurred from the very beginning of the project. The budget for the ship was set at US$600,000, based on vaguely similar earlier ships, but in fact the new ship was so revolutionary in concept and design that no one really knew how to build her or how much she would cost.

== The 1844 design ==
The Stevens's original design for the ship was completed in 1844 and called for a 250-foot-long (76-meter) ship 40 feet (12 m) in beam and displacing 1,500 tons. She was to be armed with six large-caliber muzzle-loading cannons in open casemates on decks, loaded from below the main deck by gun crews protected by armored casemates employing sloped armor to further improve protection. She was to be proof against 64-pound (29 kg) shells, the largest fired by U.S. Navy guns at the time. To achieve this, she was to be armored with 4.5-inch-thick (114 mm) iron plate reinforced by 14 inches (356 millimeters) of locust timber, a thickness of iron and wood believed by the Stevenses to be sufficient to resist any gun then known. Furthermore, she was to be semisubmersible, able to submerge herself to her gunwales to make her a smaller target for enemy gunners. Her steam engines were to produce 900 indicated horsepower (671 kilowatts) and give her an estimated top speed of 18 knots (21 mph; 33 km/h), and this very high speed for the era combined with good maneuverability was intended to make her a hard target to hit as well.

Experiments by John Ericsson with his 12-inch (305 mm) wrought iron gun Oregon, which could fire a 225-pound (102 kg) shell 5 miles (8 kilometers), soon proved that 4.5-inch (114 mm) armor was insufficient. In March 1845, Robert Stevens' health failed and he spent the next two years recuperating in Europe. His absence and the need to rethink the ship's armor scheme led to little work being done on her for several years. In 1851, Secretary of the Navy George Bancroft ordered work on the ship stopped because of her inadequate armor, and Commodore Charles W. Skinner, chief of the Navy's Bureau of Construction, announced his intention to scrap the incomplete ship and sell her materials.

== The 1854 design ==
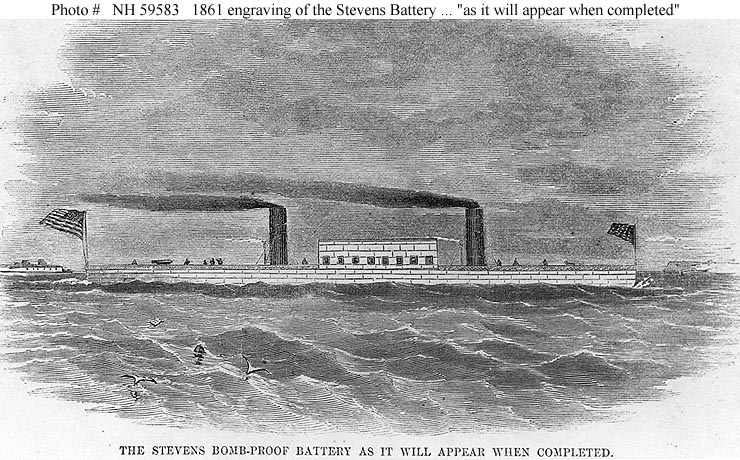
A highly speculative depiction of the appearance of the 1854 version of the Stevens Battery when completed. (Engraving published in Harper's Weekly, 1861)

The Stevens brothers succeeded in getting Congress to overrule Bancroft and Skinner, and set about radically redesigning the Stevens Battery. The new design was ready by January 1854. It called for a great increase in the ship's size and capabilities. She was now to be 420 feet (128 m) long, 53 feet (16 m) in beam, and displace 4,683 tons. She was to be proof against 125-pound (56.7 kg) shells, with armor made up of 6.75-pound (3.1 kg) iron plates sloping upwards from 1 foot (0.3 m) below the waterline to the main deck and running along the entire side of the ship from stem to stern. She was to have bulwarks to make her more seaworthy when steaming which could be lowered to reduce her freeboard in combat, making her a smaller target. Again, the ship was to be semisubmersible, able to submerge herself down to the gunwales, also to make her a smaller target.

Her armament was to consist of two 10-inch (254 mm) rifled guns mounted on pivots fore and aft and five 15-inch (381 mm) smoothbore guns mounted on the deck above an armored casemate. The 15-inch (381 mm) guns were to fire 425-pound (193 kg) shells. The gun crews, protected by the casemates, would load the 15-inch (381 mm) guns from below through holes in the deck protected by armored hoods; the gun's muzzle would be pointed into the hole, and a steam-powered cylinder would use a ramrod to load the gun for the next shot, allowing a high rate of fire. Water was to be injected into each gun automatically after it fired, to cool the gun and prevent it from being damaged by extended, rapid firing.

The ship was to have eight steam engines generating 8,600 indicated horsepower (6,413 kW) to drive two propellers and give the ship a maximum speed of 20 knots (23 mph; 37 km/h), breathtakingly fast for the time. She would have consumed a lot of coal, and her 1,000-ton coal capacity suggests that she would have had a very short operating range. She was to be the first ship equipped with fan-driven ventilation, intended to increase crew comfort by extracting fumes and hot air from below decks.

The Stevens brothers made significant progress on the newly designed ship between January 1854 and September 1855, but then work slowed again. When Robert Stevens died in April 1856, worked stopped entirely, and did not resume until 1859.

The Navy by then was losing interest in the ship. By 1861, it had spent US$500,000 on the project, and the Stevens family had spent another US$228,435. That year, Edwin Stevens and his brother John C. Stevens offered to pay for completion of the ship themselves if the Navy would agree to pay for the ship if it was completed and proved successful, but a Navy board rejected the offer, finding deficiencies in the project. It was not clear when the ship would be completed, and in 1862 Edwin Stevens estimated that it would take another US$730,484 just to make enough progress on construction of the ship for her to be launched.

== The Civil War and USRC Naugatuck ==
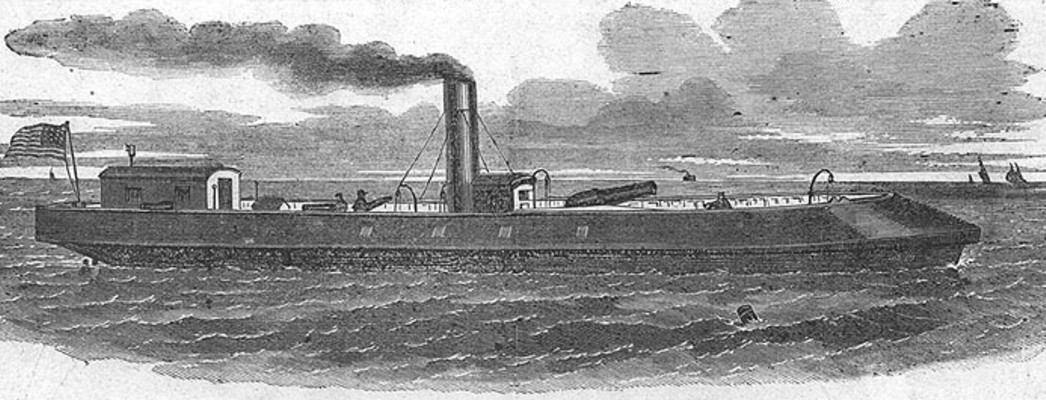
USRC E. A. Stevens, later USRC Naugatuck.

When the American Civil War broke out in 1861, Edwin Stevens claimed that a completed Stevens Battery would have a decisive impact against Confederate forces. Hoping to prove his point, he purchased an iron-hulled steamer and modified her greatly into a warship that would demonstrate to the U.S. Navy some of the principles he had in mind for the Stevens Battery, including high maneuverability, a respectable top speed, a semisubmersible capability, and a large gun on the main deck capable of a high rate of fire and loaded from below the deck by gun crews protected by armor.

The resulting vessel, initially named USRC E. A. Stevens and soon renamed USRC Naugatuck, went into service with the United States Revenue-Marine in the autumn of 1861, but soon was loaned to the Navy, resulting in U.S. Navy dispatches often incorrectly referring to her as "USS Naugatuck." In action in May 1862, her main gun burst. Her armor protected the gun crew from the explosion as Stevens intended, but the Navy was not won over by the design, and Naugatuck soon went back to the Revenue-Marine.

Although the Navy had a large ironclad program during the Civil War for which the Stevens Battery seemed a logical fit, a Navy board found numerous deficiencies in the ship and the Navy decided not to spend any more money on her. On July 17, 1862, Congress voted to turn all ownership of and rights to the Stevens Battery over to the Stevens family, and the ship spent the Civil War in her drydock.

== The 1869 design ==
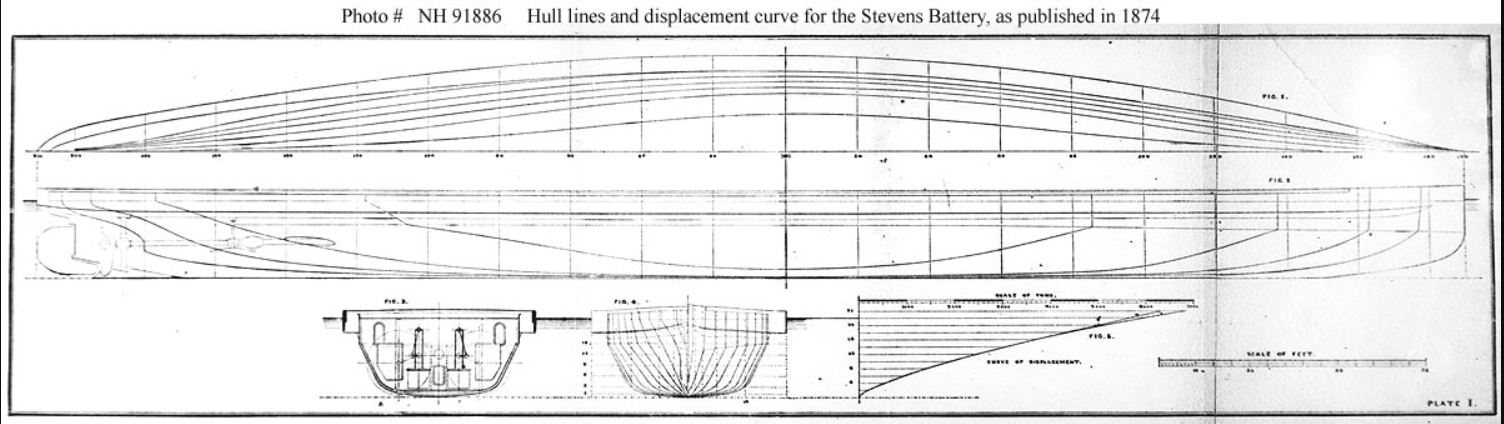
Line drawing of the final design of the Stevens Battery. (Engraving published in the 1874 book The Stevens Ironclad Battery)

Edwin Stevens died in 1868, leaving the Stevens Battery and US$1,000,000 with which to finish her to the State of New Jersey. New Jersey Governor Theodore F. Randolph appointed an oversight commission, and United States Army Major General George B. McClellan, the commander of the Army of the Potomac early in the American Civil War, became engineer-in-chief.

McClellan redesigned the ship yet again. The 1866 Battle of Lissa, in which ramming had proven an important tactic, was influential in ship design for 40 years, and his 1869 design called for the ship to have an iron spur ram bow. She also was to have a heavier hull, with 10 inches (254 mm) of iron armor and a monitor-type armored extension at the waterline. Instead of guns mounted in casemates, the Stevens Battery now was to have her guns in a revolving turret like that of USS Monitor, although the type and caliber of guns were never determined. Her machinery was removed and replaced by ten large-diameter boilers and two Maudsley and Field vertical overhead-crosshead steam engines of the return connecting-rod type which, driving two three-bladed cast-iron screws rotating in opposite directions, were to give the Stevens Battery a top speed of 15 knots (17 mph; 28 km/h).

== The end ==
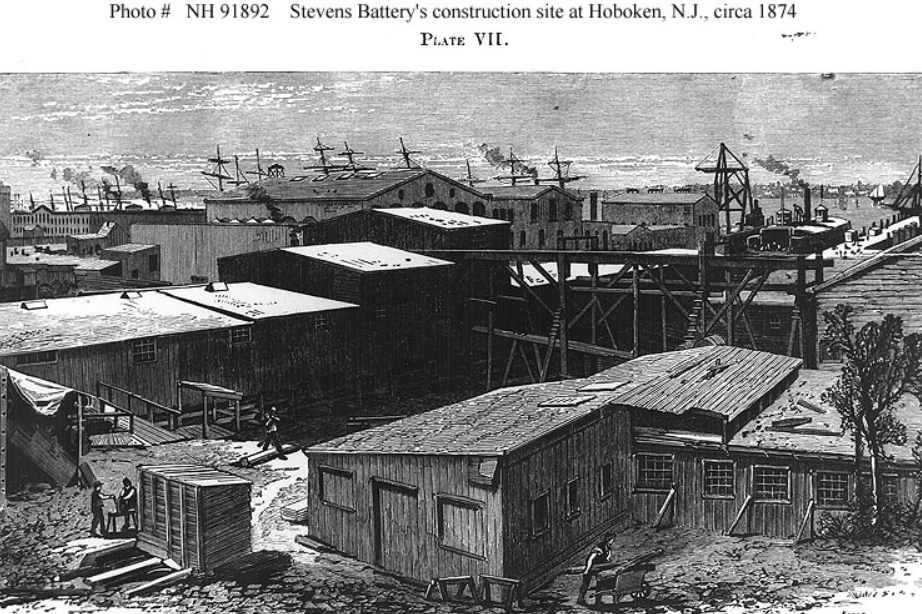
The Stevens Battery's construction site in Hoboken, New Jersey, ca. 1874. The ship's hull has been housed over. (Engraving published in the book The Stevens Ironclad Battery, 1874)

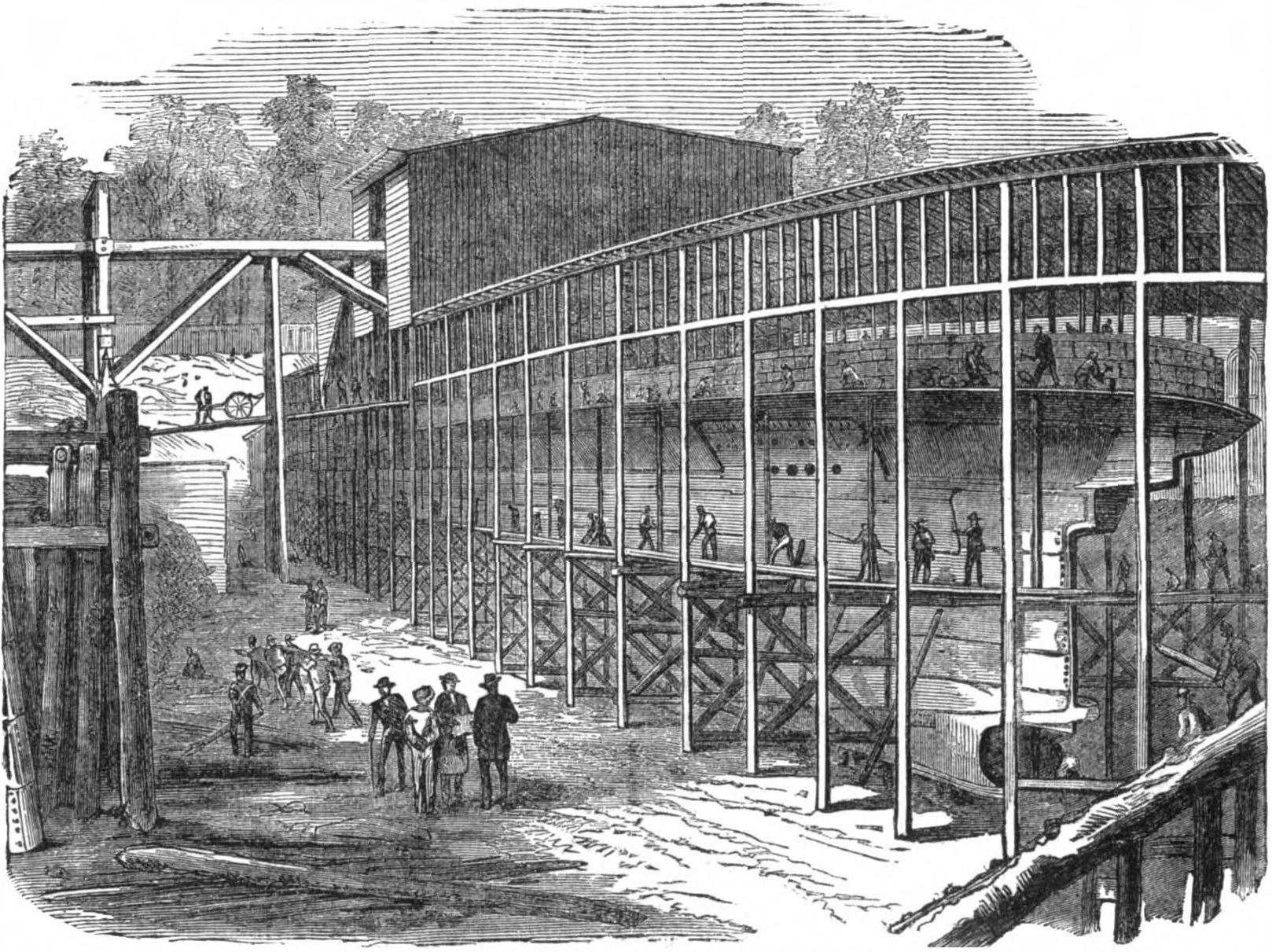
The Stevens Battery, housed over in her building dock in Hoboken, New Jersey, in 1874. (Engraving published in Scientific American, 8 August 1874)

By 1874, all the money for the completion of the Stevens Battery was gone, and the ship was not yet ready for launching even after the Stevens family had spent US$2,000,000 on her since proposing her in 1841. McClellan estimated that she would require another US$450,000 just to reach a state where she could be launched, with more necessary to fit her out after that. No more money was available from the Stevens family, Robert and Edwin Stevens both were dead, and the last hope to make something out of the project was to sell the ship. A possible sale to Prussia fell through, and there were no other potential buyers.

Most of the ship's machinery was sold in 1874 and 1875, and the ship was sold for scrap at public auction in 1881. The scrappers had to use blasting to dismantle her hull.

The Stevens Battery in many ways was far ahead of her time when proposed in 1841, and remained a revolutionary design with potential capabilities far beyond the norm for her times. But her first design proved inadequate in the face of the advance of gun technology, her second design took too long to build and never found favor with the U.S. Navy, and her third design, although modernized, came too late to salvage the project before it ran out of money. Had the Stevens Battery ever put to sea in the 1840s, 1850s, or 1860s, she might have set a new standard for the time in naval design.
