= USS Saranac =

USS Saranac may refer to the following ships of the United States Navy:

- USS Saranac (1814), a brig, built in 1814 and decommissioned in 1818.
- USS Saranac (1848), a sloop of war, launched in 1848 and wrecked in 1875.
- USS Saranac (1899), a minelayer, built in 1899, acquired by the Navy in 1917 and decommissioned in 1919.
- USS Saranac (AO-74), a Type T2-SE-A1 fleet oiler, commissioned in 1943 and decommissioned in 1946.

== See also ==
- USCGC Saranac, United States Coast Guard cutter # 52, launched in 1930 and leased to the Royal Navy as HMS Banff in 1941.
