= United States naval architect =

United States naval architects or ship designers introduced the faster and larger sailing frigates and sloop-of-wars of the early United States Navy which influenced the later merchant ships and clipper ships.

== Naval architects ==
Name - Years served

- Ships designed

Joshua Humphreys 1794 to 1801

- USS Constitution
- United States
- Constellation
- Congress
- Hassan Bashaw, 1797 brig (DANFS)

Josiah Fox 1794 to 1801, 1804 to 1809

- Constitution and Constellation class frigates, Crescent, Chesapeake, John Adams, Portsmouth, Hornet and Wasp, Ferret (schooner), and revenue cutters

William Doughty 1813 to 1837

- President, Independence 74's, Peacock class, Erie class, Java and Guerriere, North Carolina 74's class, Brandywine 44's Class, brigs, revenue cutters, and Baltimore Clipper model.

Benjamin Hutton 1803

- brig Syren, schooners Vixen (DANFS) and Skjoldebrand (DANFS), Enterprise, and Experiment

Samuel Humphreys 1813 to 1846

- Pennsylvania, Macedonian, Congress, Boston class sloops-of-war, Cyane. and Levant, Delphine and Porpoise, Somers and Bainbridge, and Morris-class revenue cutters

Francis Grice 1817 to 1859

- Truxton, Perry, and Albany

Henry Eckford 1817 to 1820

- all the War of 1812 Lake Ontario men-of-war, Superior (DANFS), General Pike (DANFS), Lady of the Lake (DANFS + DANFS), Mohawk (DANFS), schooner Grampus, Mahmoudieh (for the Ottoman Empire), and the Ohio class 74s in 1820.

Samuel M. Pook 1841 to 1866

- USS Plymouth (DANFS), Saratoga and Portsmouth

== See also ==
- Naval architecture
