= List of ships of the line of the United States Navy =

Ships of the United States Navy

Ships in current service
- Current ships

Ships grouped alphabetically
- A–B; C; D–F; G–H; I–K; L; M; N–O; P; Q–R; S; T–V; W–Z

Ships grouped by type
- Aircraft carriers; Airships; Amphibious warfare ships; Auxiliaries; Battlecruisers; Battleships; Cruisers; Destroyers; Destroyer escorts; Destroyer leaders; Escort carriers; Frigates; Hospital ships; Littoral combat ships; Mine warfare vessels; Monitors; Oilers; Patrol vessels; Registered civilian vessels; Sailing frigates; Steam frigates; Steam gunboats; Ships of the line; Sloops of war; Submarines; Torpedo boats; Torpedo retrievers; Unclassified miscellaneous; Yard and district craft

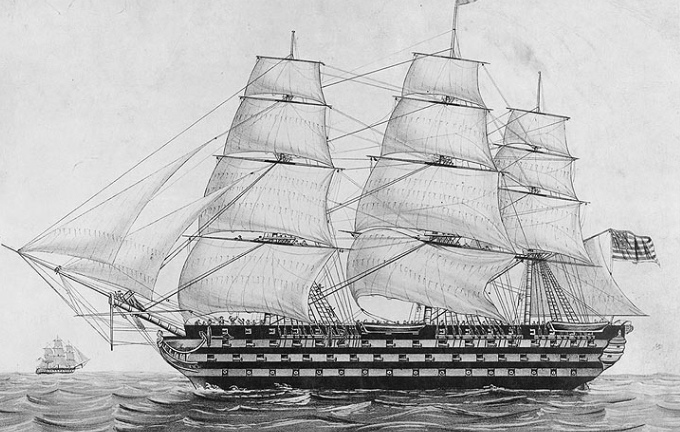
USS Pennsylvania

This is a list of ships of the line of the United States Navy. Because of the operating expense, a number of these were never launched. These ships were maintained on the stocks, sometimes for decades, in case of an urgent need.

== Continental Navy ==
- USS America (given to France upon launching, 1782)
- Unnamed class
  - Unnamed, Boston (canceled, 1778)
  - Unnamed, Philadelphia (abandoned with the capture of Philadelphia, 1777)
  - Unnamed, Poughkeepsie, New York (canceled, unknown date)

== United States Navy ==
- Columbus class
  - Columbus (canceled, 1800)
  - Unnamed, Boston Navy Yard (canceled, 1800)
  - Unnamed, New York Navy Yard (canceled, 1800)
  - Franklin (canceled, 1800)
  - Unnamed, Washington Navy Yard (canceled, 1800)
  - Unnamed, Norfolk Navy Yard (canceled, 1800)
- Independence-class
  - USS Independence (1814–1912, razeed 1836)
  - USS Washington (1814–1843)
  - USS Franklin (1815–1852)
  - USS Columbus (1819–1861)
- Chippewa-class
  - USS Chippewa (laid down 1815, never completed)
  - USS New Orleans (laid down 1815, never completed)
  - USS Pennsylvania (1837–1861)
- Delaware-class
  - USS Delaware (1820–1861)
  - USS Vermont (1848–1901)
  - USS New Hampshire (launched as depot ship, 1864; training ship, 1892–1921)
  - USS Virginia (laid down 1822, never launched)
  - USS New York (laid down 1820; never launched; burnt on ways, 1861)
  - USS Ohio (1820–1883)
  - USS North Carolina (1820–1866)
