= List of shipwrecks in April 1861 =

The list of shipwrecks in April 1861 includes ships sunk, foundered, grounded, or otherwise lost during April 1861.

== 1 April ==
List of shipwrecks: 1 April 1861
Ship	State	Description
Amsterdam	Netherlands	The steamship ran aground. She was on a voyage from Hamburg to Amsterdam, North Holland.
Eslington	United Kingdom	The ship ran aground on the Newcombe Sand, in the North Sea off the coast of Suffolk. She was on a voyage from Antwerp, Belgium to South Shields, County Durham. She was refloated.
Maid	United Kingdom	The ship was beached at Larne, County Antrim.. She was on a voyage from Nairn to Liverpool, Lancashire.
Ocean's Bride	United Kingdom	The ship was wrecked at Dundee, Forfarshire with the loss of six of her seven crew.
Tamarac	United Kingdom	The brigantine caught fire and sank off Exmouth, Devon. Her crew were rescued.

== 2 April ==
List of shipwrecks: 2 April 1861
Ship	State	Description
Eslington	United Kingdom	The ship ran aground on the Newcombe Sand, in the North Sea off the coast of Suffolk. She was on a voyage from Antwerp, Belgium to South Shields, County Durham.
Union	United States	The 139-ton sidewheel paddle steamer struck a snag and sank in the Wabash River at Clinton, Indiana.

== 3 April ==
List of shipwrecks: 3 April 1861
Ship	State	Description
Auguste	Hamburg	The ship ran aground in Holm Sound. She was on a voyage from Hamburg to Newfoundland, British North America. She was refloated and taken in to Stromness, Orkney Islands, United Kingdom.
Holland	United States	The barque was driven ashore on "Granerort". She was on a voyage from Matanzas, Cuba to Hamburg. She was refloated with assistance from the steamships Concordia and Vorwaerts both Hamburg. Concordia towed her in to Hamburg.

== 4 April ==
List of shipwrecks: 4 April 1861
Ship	State	Description
Cornelia	United States	The ship was abandoned in the Atlantic Ocean 25 nautical miles (46 km) north of the Isles of Scilly, United Kingdom. Her crew were rescued by Mary Ann Jones (United Kingdom). Cornelia was on a voyage from the Clyde to Santos, Brazil.
Gartcraig	United Kingdom	The ship ran aground on the Kimmeridge Ledge, in the English Channel off the coast of Dorset. She was on a voyage from Poole, Dorset to Quebec City, Province of Canada, British North America.
Henry Bailey	United Kingdom	The ship sprang a leak and sank in the Bristol Channel 20 nautical miles (37 km) off Lundy Island, Devon. Her crew were rescued. She was on a voyage from Tralee, County Kerry to Gloucester.
Toad	United Kingdom	The barque sprang a leak and foundered in the Mediterranean Sea off the coast of Spain. Her crew survived. She was on a voyage from Alexandria, Egypt to Falmouth, Cornwall.

== 5 April ==
List of shipwrecks: 5 April 1861
Ship	State	Description
Falke	Bremen	The steamship was driven ashore in the Weser downstream of Bremen. She was on a voyage from Bremen to London, United Kingdom.
Magnet	United Kingdom	The brig ran aground on Scroby Sands, Norfolk. She was on a voyage from Aberdeen to London. She was refloated the next day and resumed her voyage.
Scotia	United Kingdom	The brig ran aground on the Scroby Sands, Norfolk. She was on a voyage from Blyth, Northumberland to Dover, Kent. She was refloated on 7 April and taken in to Great Yarmouth, Norfolk in a leaky condition.

== 6 April ==
List of shipwrecks: 6 April 1861
Ship	State	Description
Nieman	France	The ship was driven ashore in the Yangtze-kiang. She was on a voyage from Saint-Nazaire, Ille-et-Vilaine to Shanghai, China.

== 7 April ==
List of shipwrecks: 7 April 1861
Ship	State	Description
Oregon	United Kingdom	The schooner ran aground on the South Gaze Sand, at the mouth of the River Tees and sank. Her four crew were rescued by the Middlesbrough Lifeboat. She was on a voyage from Grangemouth, Stirlingshire to Middlesbrough, Yorkshire.

== 8 April ==
List of shipwrecks: 8 April 1861
Ship	State	Description
America	United Kingdom	The barque was wrecked at Cape San Antonio, Cuba. She was on a voyage from Cienfuegos, Cuba to Boston, Massachusetts, United States.
Black Squall	Unknown	The brig was lost on the coast of North Carolina at Ocracoke Inlet.
Boundary	United States	Carrying a cargo of lumber, the schooner was wrecked on Block Island off the coast of Rhode Island.
Niagara	United Kingdom	The steamship ran aground at Queenstown, County Cork. She was on a voyage from Liverpool, Lancashire to Halifax, Nova Scotia, British North America. She was refloated and resumed her voyage.
Witchcraft	United States	The clipper ran aground at Chicamanconico on the coast of North Carolina, within sight of the Cape Hatteras and Bodie Island lighthouses and was pounded to pieces by the surf.

== 9 April ==
List of shipwrecks: 9 April 1861
Ship	State	Description
Hortense	United Kingdom	The ship was damaged by fire at London.
Jane	United Kingdom	The schooner ran aground on the Blacktail Sand, in the North Sea off the coast of Essex. She was on a voyage from Perth to London. She was refloated with assistance from the luggers Southern Bell and Zephyr and the yawls Devotion and Friends (all United Kingdom) and resumed her voyage.
Perseverance	United Kingdom	The ship was sunk by ice 130 to 150 nautical miles (240 to 280 km) east north east of Saint John's, Newfoundland, British North America. Her ten crew survived, but nine of them died before her captain was rescued by the barque Lord Petre (United Kingdom) on 27 April.
Star of the East	United Kingdom	The ship was wrecked on a reef 20 nautical miles (37 km) west of Cape Infanta, Cape Colony. She was on a voyage from Bombay, India to Liverpool, Lancashire. She broke up on 12 April.

== 10 April ==
List of shipwrecks: 10 April 1861
Ship	State	Description
Olympia	Italy	The ship was wrecked at Messina, Sicily. She was on a voyage from Gallipoli, Ottoman Empire to an English port.

== 11 April ==
List of shipwrecks: 11 April 1861
Ship	State	Description
Swift	United Kingdom	The steam barge ran aground in the River Avon at Pill, Somerset. She was on a voyage from Cardiff, Glamorgan to Bristol, Gloucestershire. She was refloated but consequently sank.

== 12 April ==
List of shipwrecks: 12 April 1861
Ship	State	Description
Dinorwic	United Kingdom	The ship was driven ashore on Texel, North Holland, Netherlands. Her crew were rescued. She was on a voyage from Caernarfon to Hamburg.
Oneko and Johann	Russian Empire	The ship was wrecked at Thisted, Denmark. Her crew were rescued. She was on a voyage from Newcastle upon Tyne, Northumberland, United Kingdom to Riga.
Paquete do Minho	Portugal	The ship ran aground on the Gunfleet Sand, in the North Sea off the coast of Essex, United Kingdom. She was on a voyage from South Shields, County Durham, United Kingdom to Montevideo, Uruguay. She was refloated and taken in to Harwich, Essex.
Queen of the Seas	United Kingdom	The ship was wrecked at Thisted. Her crew were rescued. She was on a voyage from Sunderland, County Durham to Stettin.
Tennant	United Kingdom	The brig was driven ashore at Palermo, Sicily, Italy.

== 13 April ==
List of shipwrecks: 13 April 1861
Ship	State	Description
Charles	United Kingdom	The sloop sank off Dundee, Forfarshire.

== 17 April ==
List of shipwrecks: 17 April 1861
Ship	State	Description
Adelaide	(United Kingdom of Great Britain and Ireland) South Australia	The brigantine was wrecked at MacDonnel Bay.
Clarinda	United Kingdom	The ship struck a sunken rock off the Plana Islands, Spain and was holed. She was taken in to Alicante Bay in a leaky condition.
Einigkeit	Prussia	The koff sank 30 nautical miles (56 km) west of Skagen, Denmark. Her crew were rescued by the steamship Colonist (United Kingdom). Einigkeit was on a voyage from Newcastle upon Tyne, Northumberland, United Kingdom to Pillau.
Elaine	United Kingdom	The full-rigged ship was wrecked in the Saint Lawrence River at Point-des-Monts, Province of Canada, British North America. She was on a voyage from Sunderland, County Durham to Montreal, Province of Canada.
James Baillie	United Kingdom	The barque was wrecked on Skagen, Denmark. Her crew were rescued. She was on a voyage from Newcastle upon Tyne, Northumberland to Kronstadt, Russia.
Two large unidentified boats	Confederate States of America	American Civil War: The boats were scuttled as blockships by Confederate forces in the Elizabeth River in Virginia near Craney Island on or about 17 April.

== 18 April ==
List of shipwrecks: 18 April 1861
Ship	State	Description
Julinder	United Kingdom	The barque was driven ashore 35 nautical miles (65 km) north of Jeddah, Hejaz Vilayet. Her eighteen crew survived. She was on a voyage from Newcastle upon Tyne, Northumberland to Suez, Egypt.

== 19 April ==
List of shipwrecks: 19 April 1861
Ship	State	Description
Arabian	United Kingdom	The barque was wrecked in the Nun River. Her crew were rescued. She was on a voyage from Liverpool, Lancashire to the Brass River.

== 20 April ==
List of shipwrecks: 20 April 1861
Ship	State	Description
USS Columbus	United States Navy	American Civil War: The decommissioned ship-of-the-line, laid up in ordinary at the Gosport Navy Yard in Portsmouth, Virginia, was scuttled to prevent her capture by Confederate forces.
USS Delaware	United States Navy	American Civil War: The decommissioned ship-of-the-line, laid up in ordinary at the Gosport Navy Yard in Portsmouth, Virginia, was burned to prevent her capture by Confederate forces.
Elizabeth	United Kingdom	The ship was driven ashore and wrecked on Saaremaa, Russia. Her crew were rescued. She was on a voyage from South Shields, County Durham to Kronstadt, Russia.
USS Germantown	United States Navy	American Civil War: The sloop-of-war was scuttled at the Gosport Navy Yard in Portsmouth, Virginia, to prevent her capture by Confederate forces. The Confederates later raised her and used her as a floating battery.
H. H. Boody	United States	The ship ran aground at Drogheda, County Louth, United Kingdom. Her crew were rescued. She was on a voyage from Liverpool, Lancashire, United Kingdom to Portland, Maine.
USS Merrimack	United States Navy	American Civil War: The screw frigate, laid up in ordinary at the Gosport Navy Yard in Portsmouth, Virginia, was burned to the waterline and scuttled to prevent her capture by Confederate forces. The Confederates later raised her and converted her into the casemate ironclad CSS Virginia (Confederate States Navy).
USS Pennsylvania	United States Navy	American Civil War: The ship-of-the-line, serving as a receiving ship at the Gosport Navy Yard in Portsmouth, Virginia, was burned to prevent her capture by Confederate forces.
USS Plymouth	United States Navy	American Civil War: The sloop-of-war was scuttled and partially burned while under repair at the Gosport Navy Yard in Portsmouth, Virginia, to prevent her capture by Confederate forces.
USS Raritan	United States Navy	American Civil War: The frigate, laid up in ordinary at the Gosport Navy Yard in Portsmouth, Virginia, was destroyed to prevent her capture by Confederate forces.

== 21 April ==
List of shipwrecks: 21 April 1861
Ship	State	Description
USS Columbia	United States Navy	American Civil War: The frigate was scuttled and burned to the waterline at the Gosport Navy Yard in Portsmouth, Virginia, to prevent her capture by Confederate forces.
USS Dolphin	United States Navy	American Civil War: The brig was burned at the Gosport Navy Yard in Portsmouth, Virginia, to prevent her capture by Confederate forces.
Express No. 10	France	The steamship foundered in the English Channel off Havre de Grâce, Seine-Inférieure. She was on a voyage from Havre de Grâce to Rouen. She was refloated on 24 April and found to be severely damaged. Express No. 10 was taken in to Havre de Grâce for repairs.
Maryland	United Kingdom	American Civil War: The steamship ran aground at Annapolis, Maryland. She was refloated.
New York	United States	American Civil War: The incomplete ship-of-the-line, laid down in March 1820 but never launched, was burned at the Gosport Navy Yard in Portsmouth, Virginia, to prevent her capture by Confederate forces.
Utopia	United Kingdom	The ship was driven ashore at Mogador, Morocco. She was refloated the next day.

== 22 April ==
List of shipwrecks: 22 April 1861
Ship	State	Description
Orion	United Kingdom	The barque ran aground on the Droogden, in the North Sea off the Dutch coast. She was refloated on 25 April and resumed her voyage.
Spero	United Kingdom	The ship was lost in Riga Bay. Her crew survived.

== 23 April ==
List of shipwrecks: 23 April 1861
Ship	State	Description
Corsair	(United Kingdom of Great Britain and Ireland) New Zealand	The brig was heavily damaged in a collision with the steamer Omeo in Lyttelton Harbour, New Zealand. She was driven on shore and abandoned as a wreck.
James Clinton	United States	The 105-ton sternwheel paddle steamer was destroyed on the Willamette River at Oregon City, Oregon, by a fire that spread to her from a warehouse and flour mills.
Japan	United Kingdom	The ship was wrecked near Foo Chow Foo, China. She was on a voyage from Foo Chow Foo to London.

== 24 April ==
List of shipwrecks: 24 April 1861
Ship	State	Description
Defence	United Kingdom	The Defence-class ironclad ran aground on being launched at Jarrow-on-Tyne, County Durham. She was refloated the next day.
Robert Stephenson	United Kingdom	The brig ran aground on the Newcombe Sand. She was on a voyage from London to Blyth, Northumberland. She was refloated and resumed her voyage.
Argus, and Ross D. Mangles	United Kingdom	The steam yacht Argus collided with the steamship Ross D. Mangles in the Thames Estuary and was severely damaged. Ross D. Mangles was on a voyage from Sunderland, County Durham to London. She was taken into the River Thames flooded at the bows.

== 25 April ==
List of shipwrecks: 25 April 1861
Ship	State	Description
Fanny	United Kingdom	The ship was driven ashore and wrecked at Thisted, Denmark with the loss of all hands.
Syren	United States	The 1,064-ton clipper struck the Mile Rocks off Lands End at San Francisco, California, then returned to San Francisco Harbor and was beached. She was refloated and repaired.
United States	United Kingdom	The steamship was wrecked on the Bird Rocks, in the Gulf of St. Lawrence with the loss of one life. Survivors were rescued by the barque Maranham (United Kingdom). United States was on a voyage from Glasgow, Renfrewshire to Quebec City, Province of Canada, British North America.

== 26 April ==
List of shipwrecks: 26 April 1861
Ship	State	Description
Agatha Hendrika	Denmark	The koff was driven ashore and wrecked on Læsø. Her crew were rescued. She was on a voyage from Newcastle upon Tyne, Northumberland, United Kingdom to Aalborg.
Bucephalus	United Kingdom	The ship capsized at Liverpool, Lancashire.
Kettle Bottom Lightship	United States Lighthouse Service	The lightship burned on the Potomac River at Kettle Bottom Shoals.
Mary	United Kingdom	The schooner was wrecked on Scharhörn. Her crew were rescued. She was on a voyage from Portmadoc, Caernarfonshire to Hamburg.

== 27 April ==
List of shipwrecks: 27 April 1861
Ship	State	Description
Eiferous	United Kingdom	The brig ran aground on the Gibb Sand, in the North Sea and was wrecked. Her crew were rescued. She was on a voyage from Hartlepool, County Durham to Hamburg.
Prince Albert	United Kingdom	The paddle tug was driven ashore and sank at Sunderland, County Durham with the loss of one of her four crew.
Tibislæ	Hamburg	The tjalk sank at Hamburg. She was on a voyage from Makkum, Friesland, Netherlands to Altona.

== 28 April ==
List of shipwrecks: 28 April 1861
Ship	State	Description
Ironside	United Kingdom	The ship, which had caught fire at Belize City, British Honduras, was beached in the Pass A L'Outre. She had been on a voyage from New Orleans, Louisiana, Confederate States of America to Liverpool, Lancashire.
Victoria	United Kingdom	The cutter collided with Lucknow (United Kingdom) and sank in the North Sea off Whitby, Yorkshire. Her crew were rescued by Lucknow.

== 29 April ==
List of shipwrecks: 29 April 1861
Ship	State	Description
Circassian	United Kingdom	The brig sprang a leak was abandoned off Sønderho, Denmark. Her eleven crew survived. She was on a voyage from Newcastle upon Tyne, Northumberland to Kronstadt, Russia.
Forth	United Kingdom	The schooner caught fire at sea. She was on a voyage from Sunderland, County Durham to Aberdeen. She put back to Sunderland where the fire was extinguished.
Pearl	United Kingdom	The schooner ran aground on the Cross Sand, in the North Sea. She was on a voyage from Havre de Grâce, Seine-Inférieure, France to Danzig. She was refloated on 3 May and taken in to Grimsby, Lincolnshire for repairs.

== 30 April ==
List of shipwrecks: 30 April 1861
Ship	State	Description
Coral Isle	United Kingdom	The ship ran aground off Great Yarmouth, Norfolk. She was on a voyage from Sunderland, County Durham to New York, United States. She was refloated and resumed her voyage, but consequently put in to Gravesend, Kent in a leaky condition.

== Unknown date ==
List of shipwrecks: Unknown date in April 1861
Ship	State	Description
Anna Maria	Netherlands	The brig ran aground in the Dardanelles before 28 April. She was on a voyage from Brăila, Ottoman Empire to Falmouth, Cornwall, United Kingdom.
Arcturus	United Kingdom	The brig foundered in the North Sea. She was in a voyage from Inverkeithing, Fife to Kronstadt, Russia.
Arthur	United Kingdom	The steamship ran aground on Læsø, Denmark. She was on a voyage from Hull, Yorkshire to Stettin. She subsequently broke up.
Ferdinand	Hamburg	The ship collided with Humboldt (United States) and foundered before 3 April with loss of life. Three crew were rescued by Humboldt. Ferdinand was on a voyage from Antwerp, Belgium to Hamburg.
Marquette	United States	The ship ran aground on the Burbo Bank, in Liverpool Bay. She was on a voyage from New Orleans, Louisiana to Liverpool, Lancashire, United Kingdom. She was refloated on 15 April and towed in to Liverpool.
Olaf	Norway	The koff ran aground off Hirsholmene. She was on a voyage from Hartlepool, County Durham, United Kingdom to Fredrikshavn. She was refloated and assisted in to Fredrikshavn, where she arrived on 18 April in a severely leaky condition.
Palestine	United Kingdom	The ship was abandoned in the Atlantic Ocean before 16 April. She was on a voyage from New York City, United States to London.
Rectitude	United Kingdom	The barque was sunk by ice in the Gulf of St. Lawrence before 21 April. Her crew were rescued by Colombia (United Kingdom). Rectitude was on a voyage from Dundee, Forfarshire to Quebec City, Province of Canada, British North America.
Saint Savinien	France	The brigantine was lost near "Carabournou", Ottoman Empire before 5 April. Her crew were rescued. She was on a voyage from Odesa to Constantinople, Ottoman Empire.
Sophie	Grand Duchy of Oldenburg	The brig was destroyed by fire at Falmouth before 24 April.
Spartan	United Kingdom	The ship was driven ashore before 4 April. She was on a voyage from Hong Kong to London. She was refloated and taken in to Foo Chow Foo, China where it was found she had broken her back. She was condemned.
Tasmania	(United Kingdom of Great Britain and Ireland) Victoria	The steamship was wrecked at Waitara, New South Wales before 11 April. Some of her crew were rescued by Aborigines.
Troas	United Kingdom	The ship was driven ashore in the Hooghly River. She was on a voyage from Sunderland, County Durham to Calcutta, India. She was later refloated and taken in to Calcutta, where she arrived on 24 April.
