= USS Columbus (1819) =

90-gun ship of the line in the United States Navy

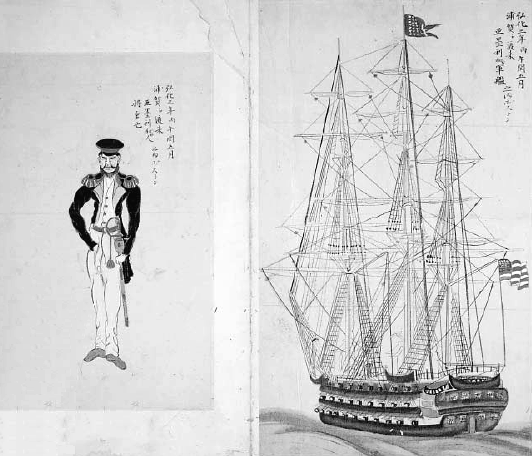
- USS Columbus

History

United States
- Name: USS Columbus
- Builder: Washington Navy Yard
- Launched: 1 March 1819
- Commissioned: 7 September 1819
- Decommissioned: March 1848
- Fate: Scuttled, 20 April 1861

General characteristics
- Type: Ship of the line
- Tonnage: 2480
- Length: 191 ft 9 in (58.45 m)
- Beam: 53 ft 5 in (16.28 m)
- Draft: 25 ft (7.6 m)
- Complement: 780 officers and men
- Armament: 68 × 32-pounder (15 kg) guns, 24 × 42-pounder (19 kg) carronades

USS Columbus was a 92-gun ship of the line in the United States Navy. Although construction of the warship was authorized by Congress on 2 January 1813, the burning of the Washington Navy Yard by the Americans in 1814 just prior to the British occupation of Washington, intended to keep US military stores out of British hands, led to the destruction of any initial framing. Days after Congress re-authorized the vessel on 29 April 1816, a keel was laid and construction resumed.

Columbus was launched on 1 March 1819 into the Anacostia River at the Washington Navy Yard; her dimensions were "191 feet 10 inches, between perpendiculars; breadth of beam from outside to outside, 53 feet 6 inches". The warship was commissioned on 29 November 1819, Master Commandant John H. Elton, commanding. Her original armament comprised "92 guns: 68 long 32-pounders and twenty-four 42-pounder carronades"; this was greater than the Naval artillery equipping most of the nine ships-of-the-line authorized by Congress in the 1816 legislation, which specified that these warships "rate not less than seventy-four guns each".

Enslaved laborer and diarist, Michael Shiner, documented the launching thus, "The United States Ship Columbus 74, constructed and built by Colonel William Doughty and launch on 4 March 1819 on Monday at Washington Navy Yard the United States Ship Columbus 74."

== History ==
Clearing Norfolk, Virginia, on 28 April 1820, Columbus served as flagship for Commodore William Bainbridge in the Mediterranean until returning to Boston on 23 July 1821.In 1824 enslaved seaman James Hutton through his attorney Francis Scott Key brought a freedom suit against Lt. William J. Belt, USN. Judge William Cranch of the District of Columbia Court, in his verdict, found that Lt. Belt by his action in enrolling James Hutton as an Ordinary Seaman aboard USS Columbus, and USS Spark (1813) was sufficient evidence of "implied manumission" and subsequently accorded Hutton his freedom. in reaching a decision, the court relied on muster rolls of both vessels and the letter of Commodore William Bainbridge dated 6 June 1825, see thumbnail.

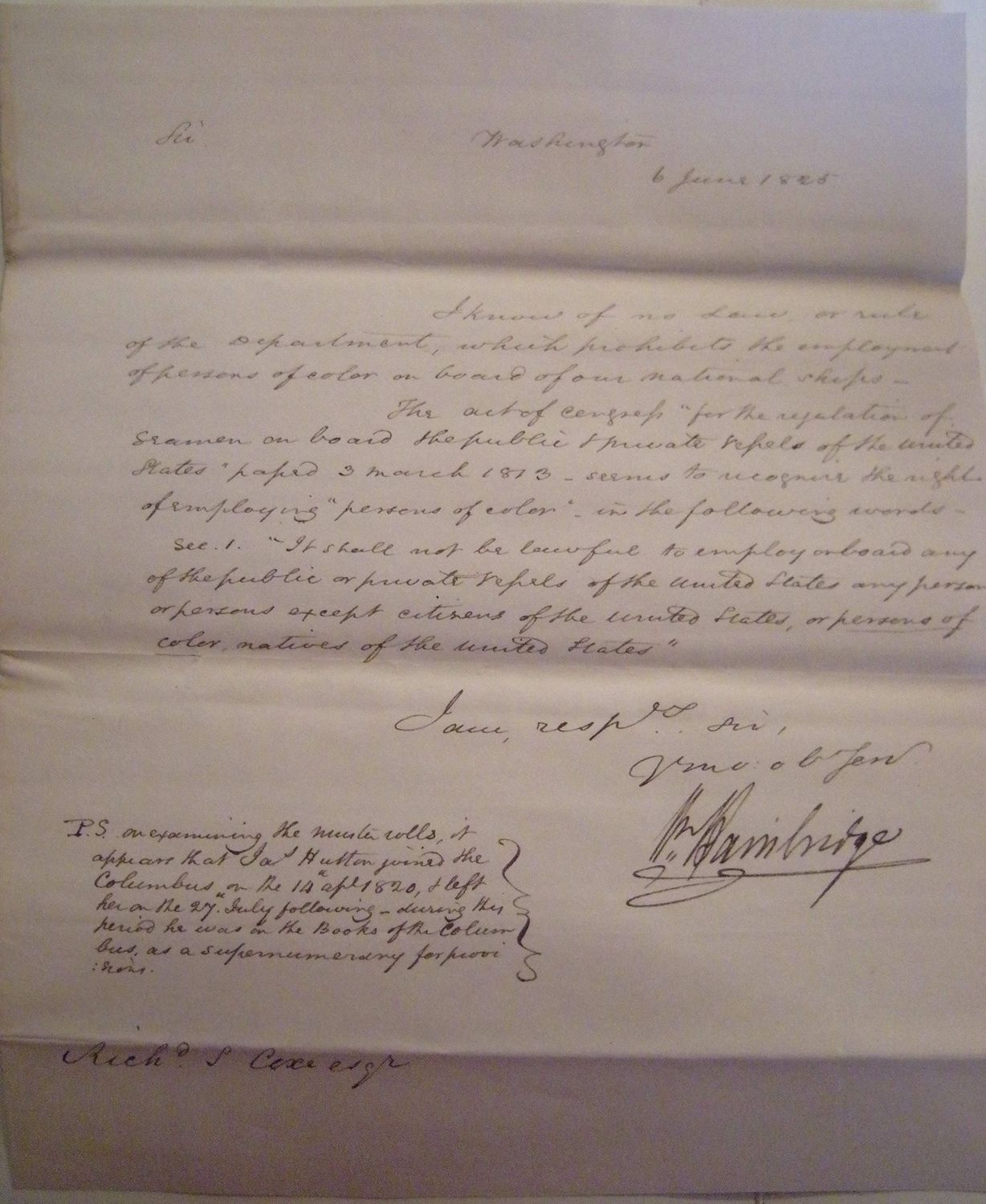
Commodore William Bainbridge letter re enslaved seaman James Hutton 6 June 1825 and his service on board USS Columbus and USS Spark

Serving as a receiving ship after 1833, she remained at Boston in ordinary until sailing to the Mediterranean on 29 August 1842, as flagship for Commodore Charles W. Morgan. On 24 February 1843, she sailed from Genoa, Italy, and reached Rio de Janeiro, Brazil, on 29 July to become flagship of the Brazil Squadron, Commodore Daniel Turner. She returned to New York City on 27 May 1844 for repairs.

After embarking Commodore James Biddle, Commander, East India Squadron, she sailed on 4 June 1845 for Canton, China, where on 31 December Commodore Biddle exchanged ratified copies of the first American commercial treaty with China. Columbus remained there until April 1846, when she sailed for Japan to attempt opening that country to American commerce. She raised Uraga Channel on 19 July in company with Vincennes, but achieved no success. Recalled at the outbreak of the Mexican–American War Columbus reached Valparaíso, Chile, in December and arrived off Monterey, California, 2 March 1847. Too large to be useful in the California operations, the ship sailed from San Francisco on 25 July for Norfolk, arriving on 3 March 1848.

In 1845 the writer, Charles Nordhoff joined the ship as a boy (aged 15), and served for 3 years. He would write later of his adventure in his book. Man-of-War Life: a Boy's Experience in the U. S. Navy, largely autobiographical (Cincinnati, 1855).

At Norfolk Navy Yard, Columbus lay in ordinary until 20 April 1861, when she was sunk by withdrawing Union forces to prevent her falling into Confederate hands.

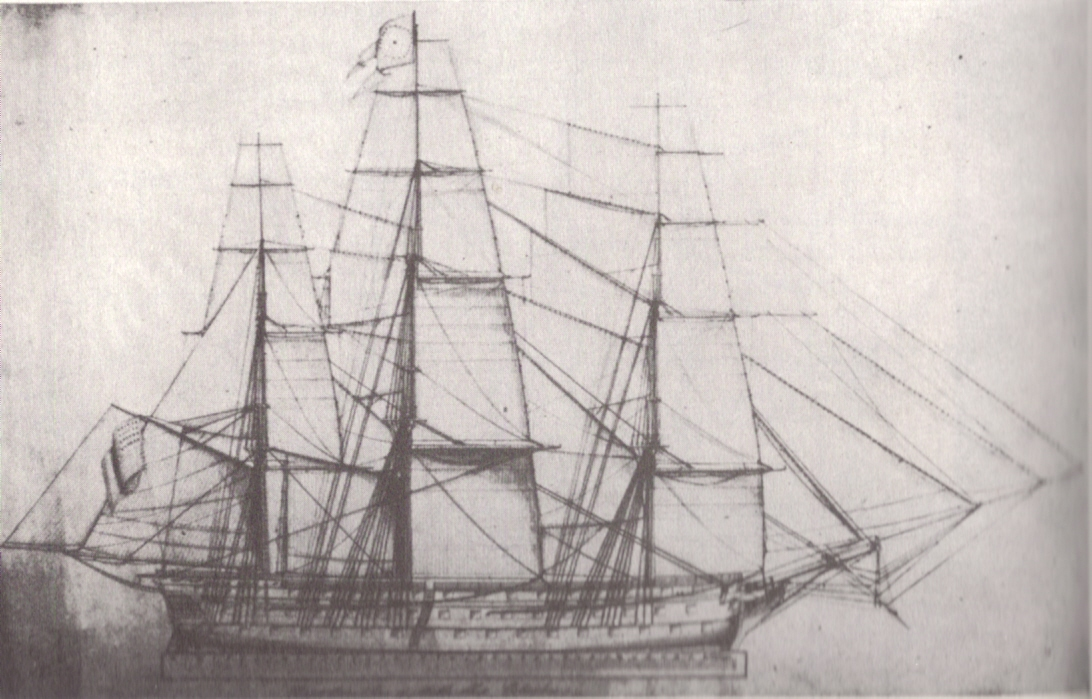
Sailmaker's plan of USS Columbus

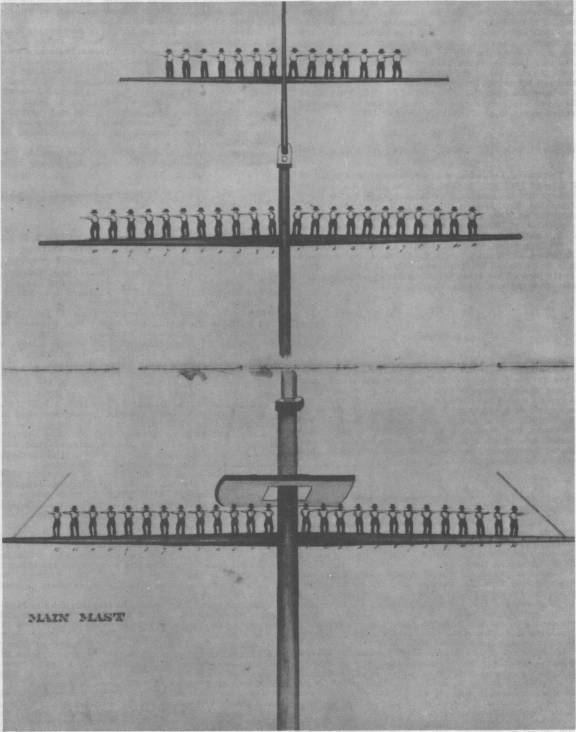
An 1847 illustration of men manning the yards aboard USS Columbus
