= William Doughty (naval architect) =

American naval architect

- Born: James William Doughty c. 1773; Philadelphia, Pennsylvania
- Died: 1859; Georgetown, District of Columbia (Washington D.C.)
- Other names: James Doughty, John Doughty
- Occupations: Clerk, Naval carpenter, United States naval architect, Militia Officer, Soldier
- Spouse: Eleanor Doughty
- Military career
- Allegiance: United States
- Service years: War of 1812: Battle of Bladensburg (1814)
- Commands: U.S. Navy Philadelphia Navy Yard (1794–1803) United States naval architect Washington Navy Yard (1803–1837) Captain of Navy Yard Rifles (Navy Yard volunteers), Major Robert Brent's 2nd Regiment, District of Columbia Militia (1814)

Born James William Doughty also known as William Doughty and James Doughty (c. 1773 – 1859) was a United States naval architect who designed many of the sailing "Seventy-four ships". Doughty worked for many years as a United States naval architect laying down such ships "as the USS Delaware, USS Ohio, and USS Carolina that rank with the best ships ever built."

== Shipbuilding career ==
=== Philadelphia Navy Yard ===
William Doughty began his career as protégé of noted naval constructor Joshua Humphreys. In a letter to Secretary Henry Knox dated 22 October 1794, Humphreys recommended young Doughty for a position as his clerk at the Philadelphia Navy Yard. Humphreys stated he believed Doughty to be a "devoted and distinguished worker." Doughty took the oath of allegiance on 23 October 1794 as a clerk at the Philadelphia Naval Shipyard; his pay was set at $500.00 per annum.

=== Washington Navy Yard ===
On April 12, 1804, William Doughty was appointed as head carpenter, Washington Navy Yard, by Secretary of the Navy Robert Smith Doughty was popular among shipyard mechanics and laborers and was supportive of their 1835 strike. Naval constructors like William Doughty combined the skills of a naval architect and engineer, at the navy yard his position was somewhat unique, for the naval constructor job provided Doughty with a wide range of connections; most importantly, it meant that he reported to the Board of Navy Commissioners and not to the shipyard commandants like Thomas Tingey and Isaac Hull. The BNC placed such a high value on Doughty's nautical expertise that they scheduled a regular Monday morning meeting to consult with him each week. This relationship with the Navy Commissioners allowed Doughty considerable influence. The regard he enjoyed with the shipyard workforce also led to considerable tension as during the strike of 1835, when he advised the ship carpenters to hold out for higher wages.

His career as a shipbuilder, though, was long and very successful; the 1850 census for the District of Columbia records his real estate as valued at $35,000. He was also one of the highest-paid civilians at the Washington Navy Yard. The navy yard payroll for April 1829 shows William Doughty's annual salary as $1,900, nearly the same as a naval captain. William Doughty, while working at Washington Navy Yard designed many naval vessels, including the USS Independence and USS Brandywine. He also designed the President, USS United States 74s, Peacock class, Erie class, Java and Guerrier, USS North Carolina 74s class, USS Brandywine 44s Class, brigs, revenue cutters, and Baltimore Clipper model.

== War of 1812 ==
=== Navy Yard Rifles ===
During the War of 1812 British Chesapeake Campaign, William Doughty served as a militia captain and was incorrectly named in the military records as John Doughty. In 1813, Doughty formed the quasi-militia Navy Yard volunteers and drilled them regularly after Navy Yard working hours. This military unit became known as the "Navy Yard Rifles", becoming a volunteer rifle company that served under the command of Major Robert Brent of the 2nd Regiment of the District of Columbia Militia, who was the first Mayor of Washington, D.C., in the defense of the capital city which resulted in the disastrous defeat in August 1814 at the Battle of Bladensburg.

== Bibliography ==
- Brown, Gordon S. The Captain Who Burned His Ships Captain Thomas Tingey, USN, 1750–1829 Naval Institute Press: Annapolis 2011 pp 141–142.
- Donovan, Jane B. Henry Foxall: Methodist, Industrialist, American, New Room Books 2017.
- Maloney, Linda M. The Captain from Connecticut: the Life and Naval Times of Isaac Hull. Northeastern University Press.1986 p. 268.
- Sharp, John G. History of the Washington Navy Yard Civilian Workforce 1799–1962 Stockton: Vindolanda Press, 2005 p. 13.
- Shiner, Michael. The Diary of Michael Shiner Relating to the History of the Washington Navy Yard 1813-1869. Transcribed in 2007.
- Wood, Virginia Steele William Doughty Naval Constructor 1773–1859 New Interpretations in Naval History Selected Papers from the Twelfth Naval History Symposium, ed. W.Cogan US Naval Academy: Annapolis 1992 pp 114–122.
