= Narrow gauge railway at Camp A. A. Humphreys =

Coordinates: 38.719737°N 77.154582°W

Camp A. A. Humphreys
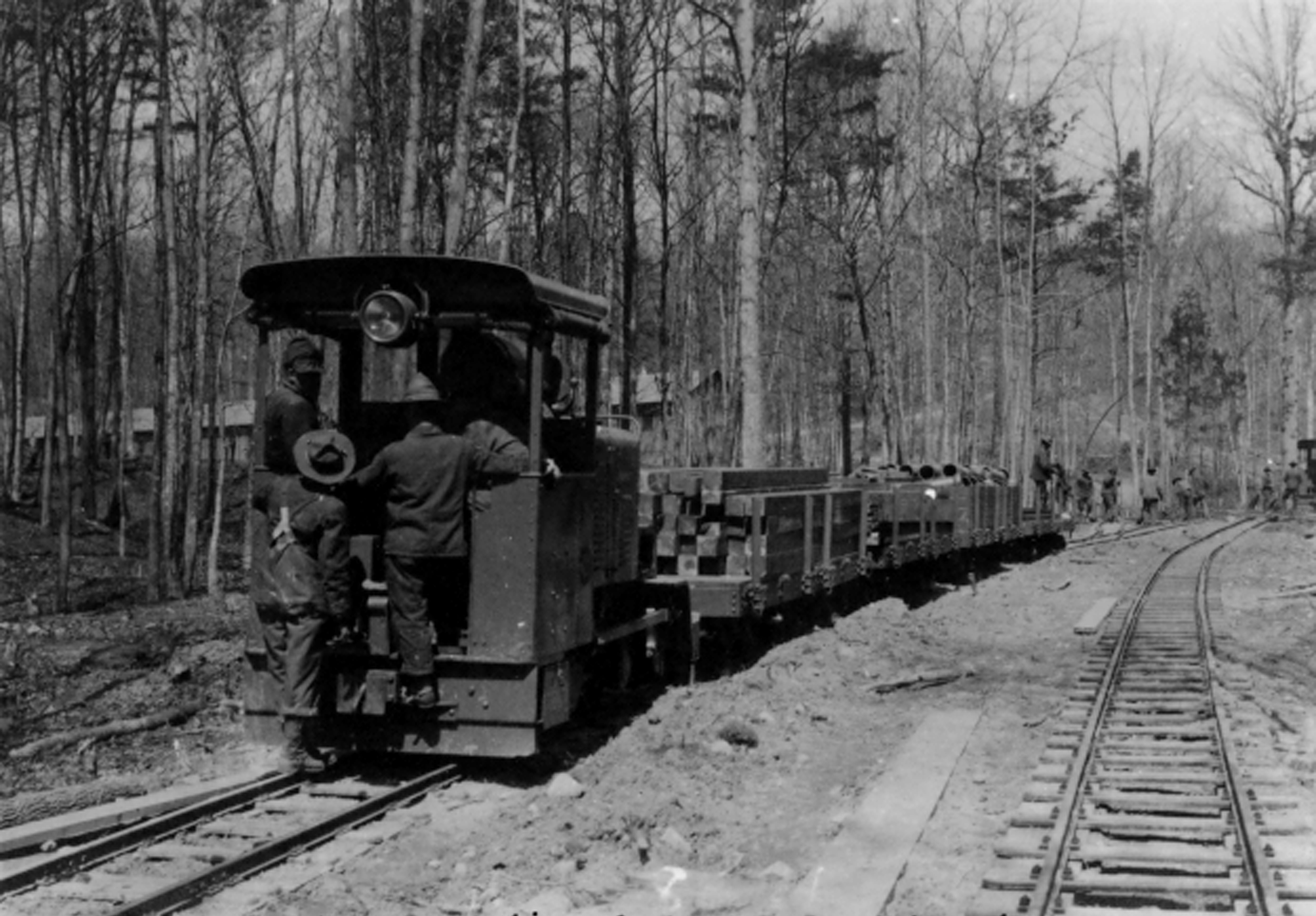

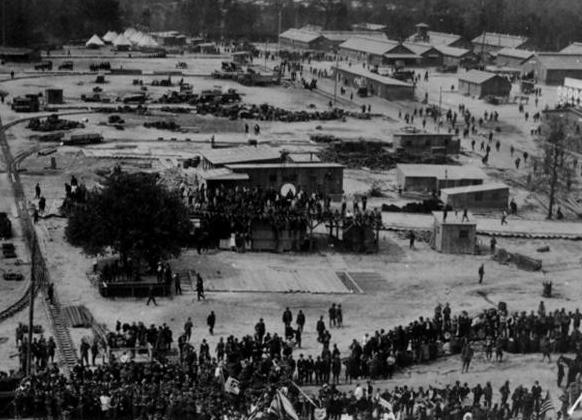
- Hundreds of soldiers were trained to lay and operate narrow gauge railways before heading to frontlines in Europe in 1918

Technical
- Line length: 20 miles (32 km)
- Track gauge: 2 ft (610 mm)

The narrow gauge railway at Camp A. A. Humphreys was a 20 miles (32 km) long 2 ft (610 mm) gauge military railway at what is now Fort Belvoir, Virginia.

== History ==
In 1918, the AA Humphreys camp was set-up in Fort Belvoir, Virginia. It was named after Brigadier General Andrew Atkinson Humphreys, who served during the civil war in the Union Army and later as the Chief of the engineers of the army before he died in 1883. It was an important training camp for pioneers and other soldiers who learned to build roads, railroads, bridges and trenches.

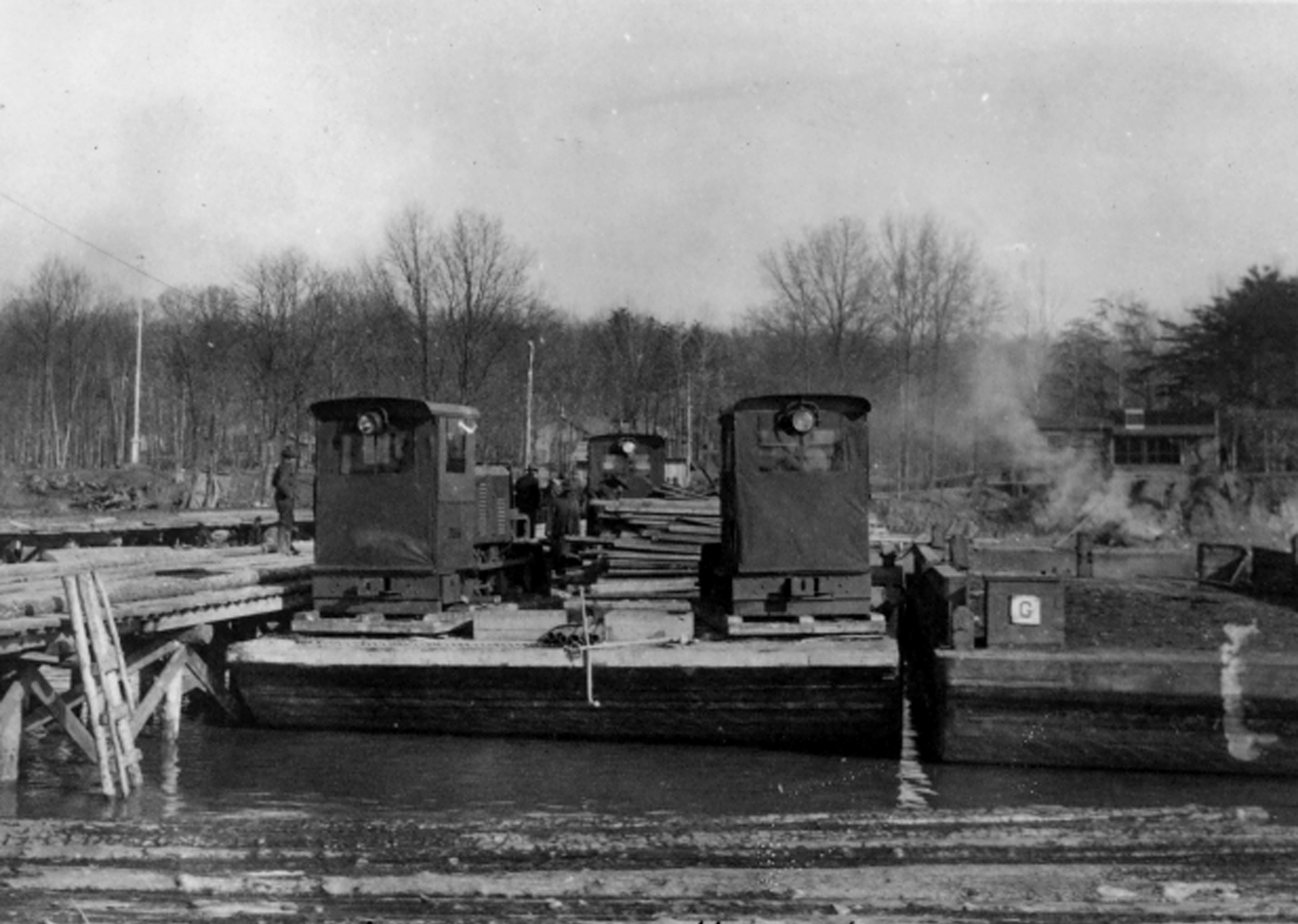
Delivery of 75 hp Baldwin gas locomotives at Belvoir Dock

Beginning in the first half of 1918, a 20 miles (32 km) long narrow gauge line was built there. 15 miles (24 km) of track ran between the pier at the Potomac River and Camp Humphreys.

The light rails of a narrow-gauge railway could be laid quickly and, if necessary, quickly dismantled. The 5 metres (16 ft) long prefabricated sections of the flying track weighing 100 kilograms (220 lb) could be carried and laid by only two soldiers. Because of the small gauge, smaller radii could be used than with standard gauge railways.

From March 1918 until the end of the war on 11 November 1918, hundreds of soldiers and engineers learned how to construct and operate a narrow-gauge railway. They trained to lay tracks, to build railway bridges and to operate the small steam and gasoline locomotives. Many narrow-gauge railways were used by American troops in the international war theater to transport supplies, ammunition and building materials as well as casualties and the wounded. Similar narrow gauge railways were located in Fort Benning, Georgia, Fort Sill, Oklahoma, Fort Benjamin Harrison, Indiana, and Fort Dix, New Jersey.

Around 1920, the narrow gauge railway tracks of Camp Humphreys were lifted and fell into oblivion. After the war, some of the locomotives and wagons of Camp Humphreys and other forts were re-used in mining operations and plantations around the world rather than being scrapped.
