= Andrew A. Humphreys =

American general (1810–1883)

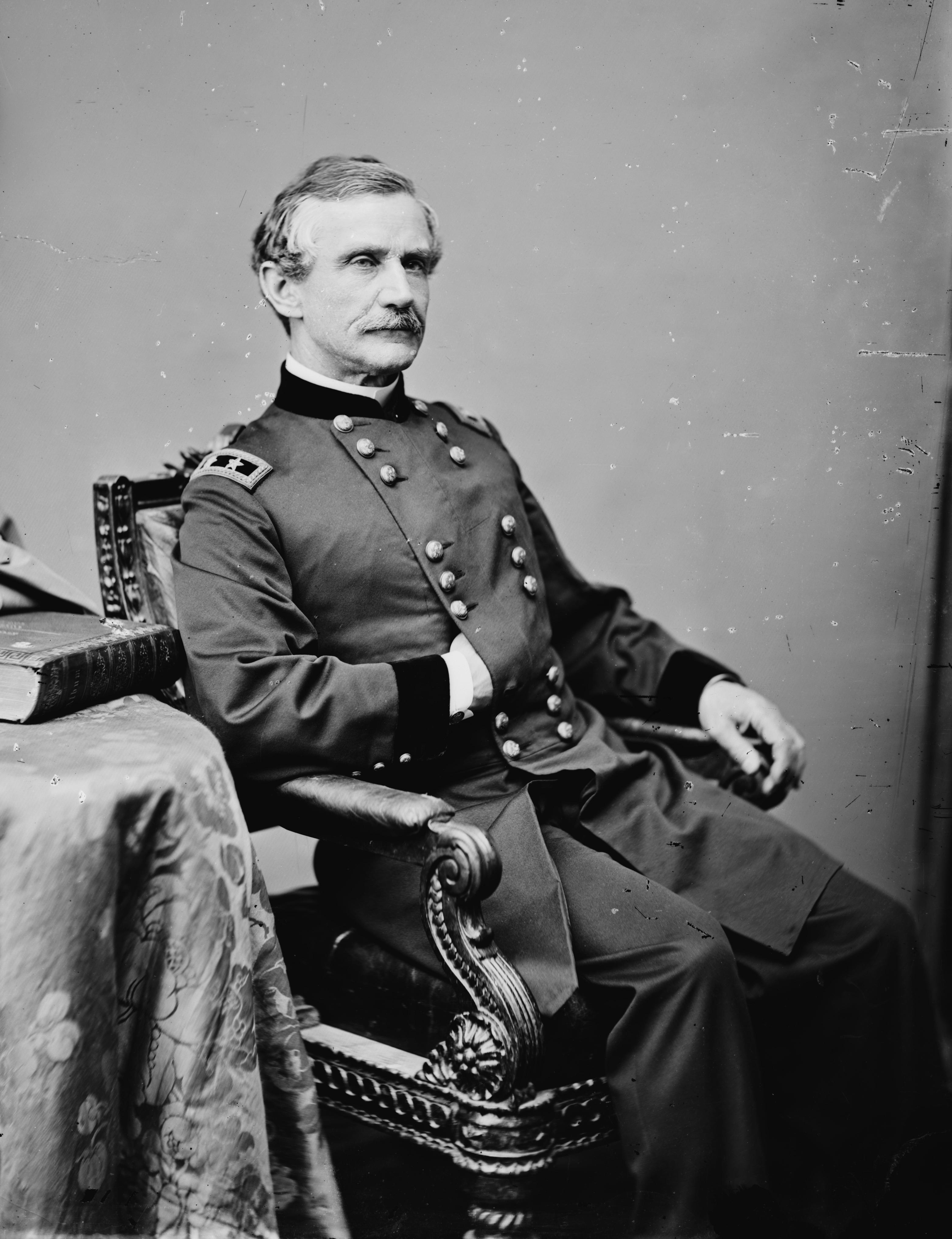
- Andrew A. Humphreys
- Born: November 2, 1810; Philadelphia, Pennsylvania
- Died: December 27, 1883 (aged 73); Washington, D.C.
- Burial place: Congressional Cemetery
- Spouse: Rebecca Humphreys Hollingsworth
- Relatives: Joshua Humphreys (grandfather); Samuel Humphreys (father); Letitia Atkinson (mother); Henry Humphreys (son)
- Military career
- Allegiance: United States (Union)
- Branch: United States Army; Union Army
- Service years: 1831–1836, 1838–1879
- Rank: Major General
- Commands: II Corps; US Army Corps of Engineers
- Conflicts: Seminole Wars; Second Seminole War; American Civil War; Peninsula campaign; Battle of Yorktown; Battle of Williamsburg; Battle of Malvern Hill; Maryland campaign; Battle of Fredericksburg; Battle of Chancellorsville; Gettysburg campaign; Battle of Gettysburg; Bristoe campaign; Mine Run campaign; Overland Campaign; Siege of Petersburg; Appomattox campaign; Battle of Sailor's Creek; Battle of High Bridge; Battle of Cumberland Church
- Other work: Authored Report upon the physics and hydraulics of the Mississippi River (1861) From Gettysburg to the Rapidan (1883) and The Virginia Campaign of '64 and '65 (1883)

Andrew Atkinson Humphreys (November 2, 1810 – December 27, 1883), was a career United States Army officer, civil engineer, and a Union General in the American Civil War. He served in senior positions in the Army of the Potomac, including division command, chief of staff, and corps command, and was Chief Engineer of the U.S. Army.

== Early life ==
Andrew Atkinson Humphreys was born in Philadelphia, Pennsylvania, to a family with Quaker ancestry. His grandfather, Joshua, was the "Father of the American Navy", who had served as chief naval constructor from 1794 to 1801 and designed the first U.S. warships, six frigates, the USS Constitution ("Old Ironsides") and her sister ships. Andrew's father, Samuel designed and built the USS Pennsylvania, the largest and most heavily armed ship at the time. Samuel, like his father, was a chief naval constructor from 1826 to 1846. Andrew graduated from Nazareth Hall (predecessor to the present-day Moravian College and Theological Seminary). Thereafter, he entered the United States Military Academy, more commonly known as West Point, at the age of seventeen. He graduated from the Academy on July 1, 1831. Upon graduation Humphreys joined the second artillery regiment at Fort Moultrie in South Carolina. Near the beginning of the Seminole Wars he followed his regiment in the summer of 1836 to Florida where he received his first combat experience, while also falling ill, having to leave by September. J. Watts De Peyster, who rose to brevet major general for the New York Volunteer Army during the Civil War and later Civil War historian says:

The only fighting that he saw previous to the "Great American Conflict" was in the miserably mismanaged Seminole War in 1836. Of suffering he underwent sufficiency. Disgusted, he resigned 30 September 1836. For about two years he was a Civil Engineer in the U.S. service. On 7 July 1838, he was re-appointed in the U.S. Army as 1st Lieutenant in the corps of Topographical Engineers. Of the next twenty-three years each one was illustrated by some distinguished engineering achievement which won for him a reputation at home only exceeded by that what he acquired abroad.

— de Peyster

After being reinstated in the engineer corps in 1844 Humphreys was put in charge of the Central Office of the Coast Survey at Washington and appointed to captain in 1848. During 1850 he was directed to commence surveys and investigate the Mississippi River Delta in order to figure out what could prevent inundation and increase the depth of water on the bars. This work took up ten years of Humphreys' life, during which he visited Europe. From 1853 to 1857 he also worked on the Pacific Railroad Surveys with Secretary of War Jefferson Davis. Humphreys, along with 100-plus men, including soldiers, scientists and technicians, went west to find the most practical route for the first transcontinental railroad. As a result, just before the Civil War, Humphreys was ranked among the upper echelon of American people of learning and gained membership to the American Philosophical Society.

== Civil War ==
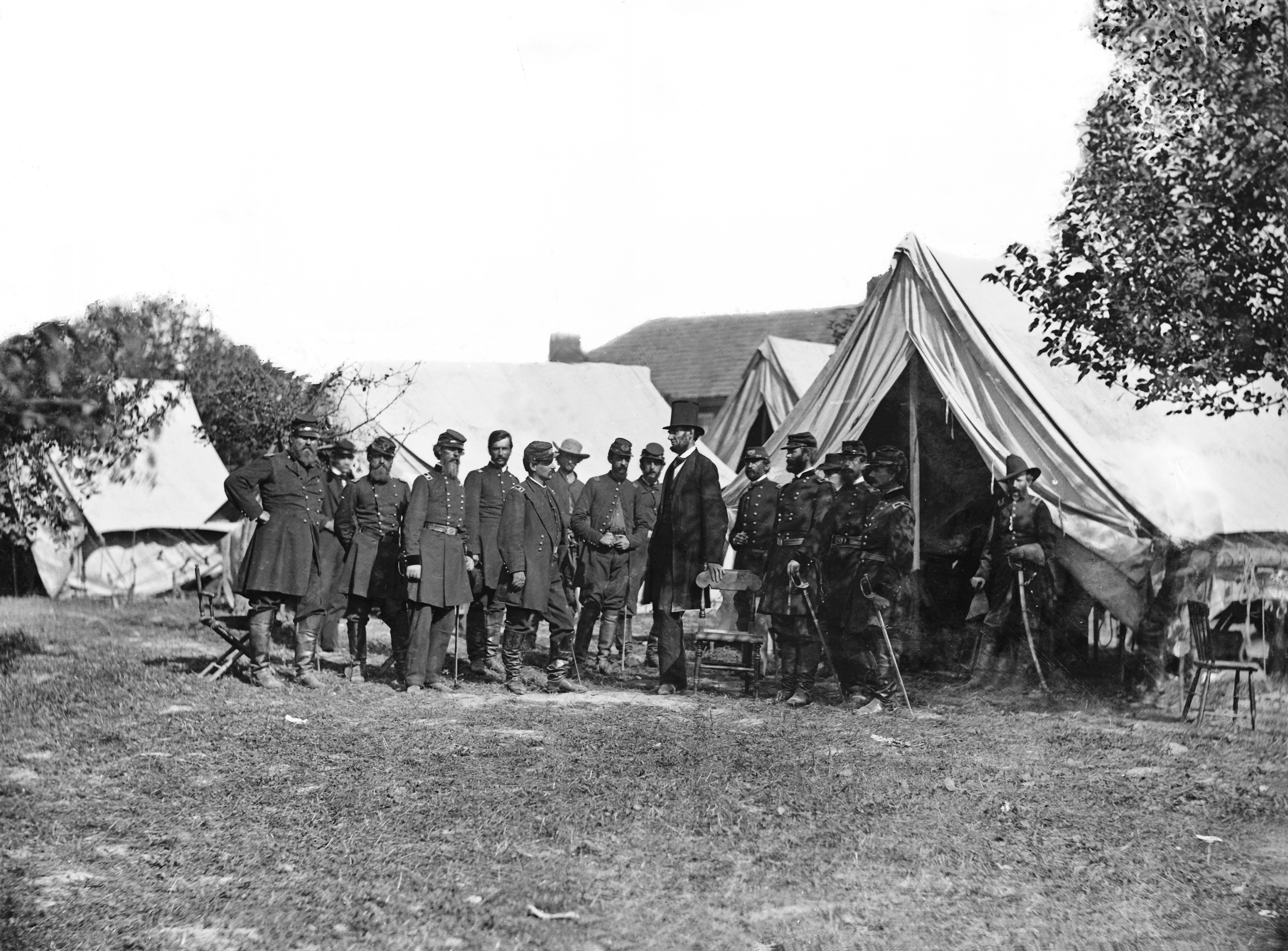
Humphreys, second from the right, and President Abraham Lincoln after the Battle of Antietam

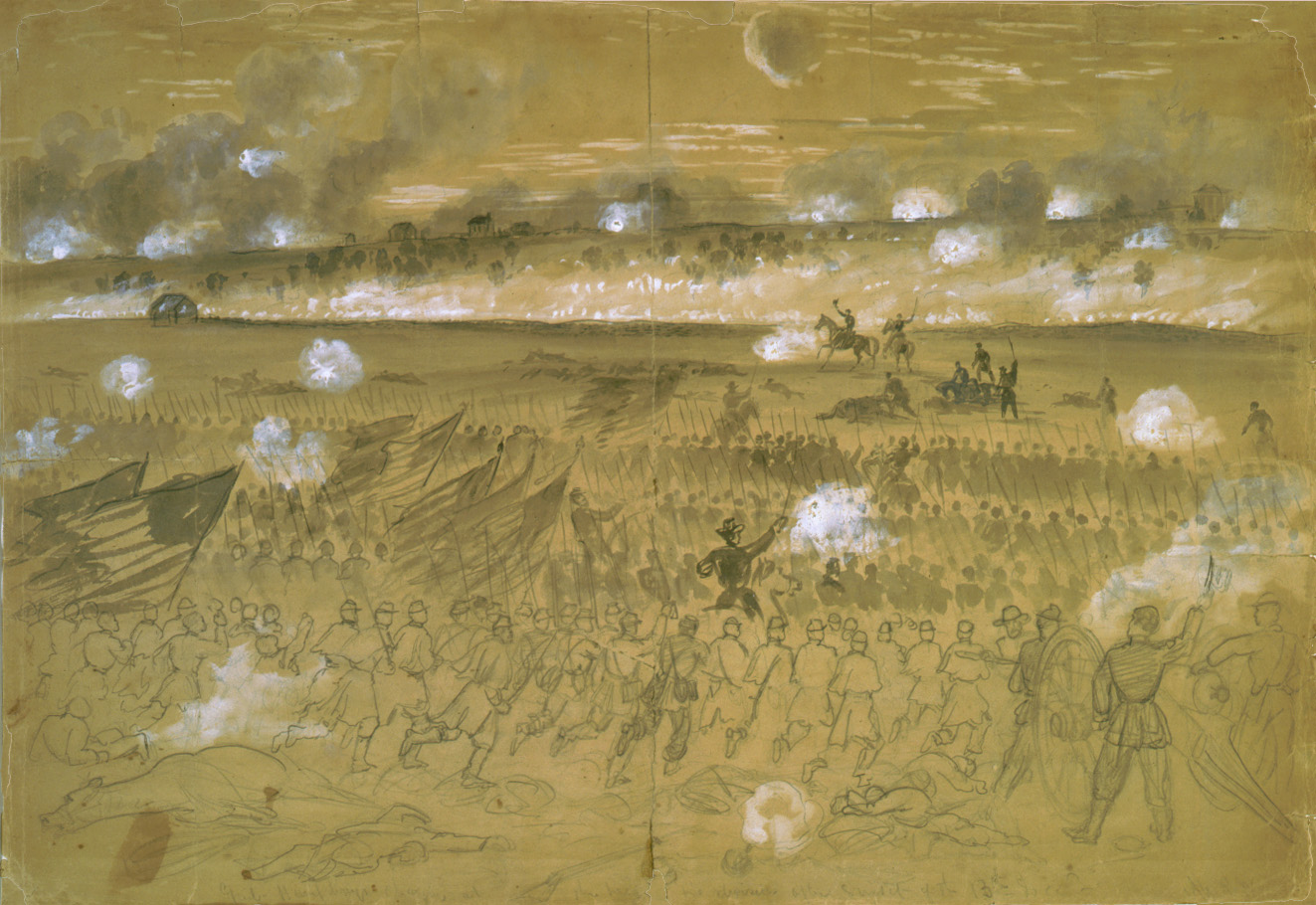
General Humphrey charging at the Battle of Fredericksburg, by Alfred Waud

After the outbreak of the Civil War, Humphreys was promoted on August 6, 1861, to major and became chief topographical engineer in Maj. Gen. George B. McClellan's Army of the Potomac. Humphreys was put in this position because of his achievements in life but also because "those in power at Washington distrusted him because of his intimacy with Jefferson Davis before the war." Initially involved in planning the defenses of Washington, D.C., by March 1862, he shipped out with McClellan for the Peninsula Campaign. Humphreys was promoted to brigadier general of volunteers on April 28 and on September 12 assumed command of the new 3rd Division in the V Corps of the Army of the Potomac, two brigades of nine month regiments mustered in in August. The division did not arrive on the field until September 18 and so missed the battle of Antietam, instead getting its first taste of action at the Battle of Shepherdstown two days later when part of it was attacked and routed by A.P. Hill's Confederate division. At the Battle of Fredericksburg, his division achieved the farthest advance against fierce Confederate fire from Marye's Heights, with Humphreys personally commanding from the very front of the line on horseback, while five of his seven staff were shot down. During the battle Humphreys himself had two of horses shot from under him and finding a third he continued to ride, having his clothes pierced by bullets but himself unharmed. His corps commander, Brig. Gen. Daniel Butterfield, wrote: "I hardly know how to express my appreciation of the soldierly qualities, the gallantry, and energy displayed by my division commanders, Generals George Sykes, Humphreys, and Charles Griffin." General Butterfield goes on to talk personally about Humphreys' actions: "General Humphreys personally led his division in the most gallant manner. His attack was spirited, and worthy of veterans. Made as it was by raw troops, the value of the example set by the division commander can hardly be estimated." For an officer with little combat experience, he inspired his troops with his personal bravery. Historian Larry Tagg wrote:

... for certain good reasons connected with the effect of what I did upon the spirit of the men and from an invincible repugnance to ride anywhere else, I always rode at the head of my troops." Lt. Cavada of the general's staff recalled that just before he took his troops up to the Stone Wall at Fredericksburg, Humphreys had bowed to his staff in his courtly way, "and in the blandest manner remarked, 'Young gentlemen, I intend to lead this assault; I presume, of course, you will wish to ride with me?'" Since it was put like that, the staff had done so, and five of the seven officers were knocked off their horses. After his men had taken as much as they could stand in front of the Stone Wall on Marye's Heights, the next brigade coming up the hill saw Humphreys sitting his horse all alone, looking out across the plain, bullets cutting the air all around him. Something about the way the general was taking it pleased them, and they sent up a cheer. Humphreys looked over, surprised, waved his cap to them with a grim smile, and then went riding off into the twilight. In this way Humphreys had turned his first division's dislike of him into admiration for his heroic leadership ...

— Larry Tagg, Generals of Gettysburg

Although respected by his men for his bravery under fire, Humphreys was not well liked by them. In his 50s, they considered him an old man, despite his relatively youthful appearance. His nickname was "Old Goggle Eyes" for his eyeglasses. He was a taskmaster and strict disciplinarian. Charles A. Dana, the Assistant Secretary of War, called him a man of "distinguished and brilliant profanity."

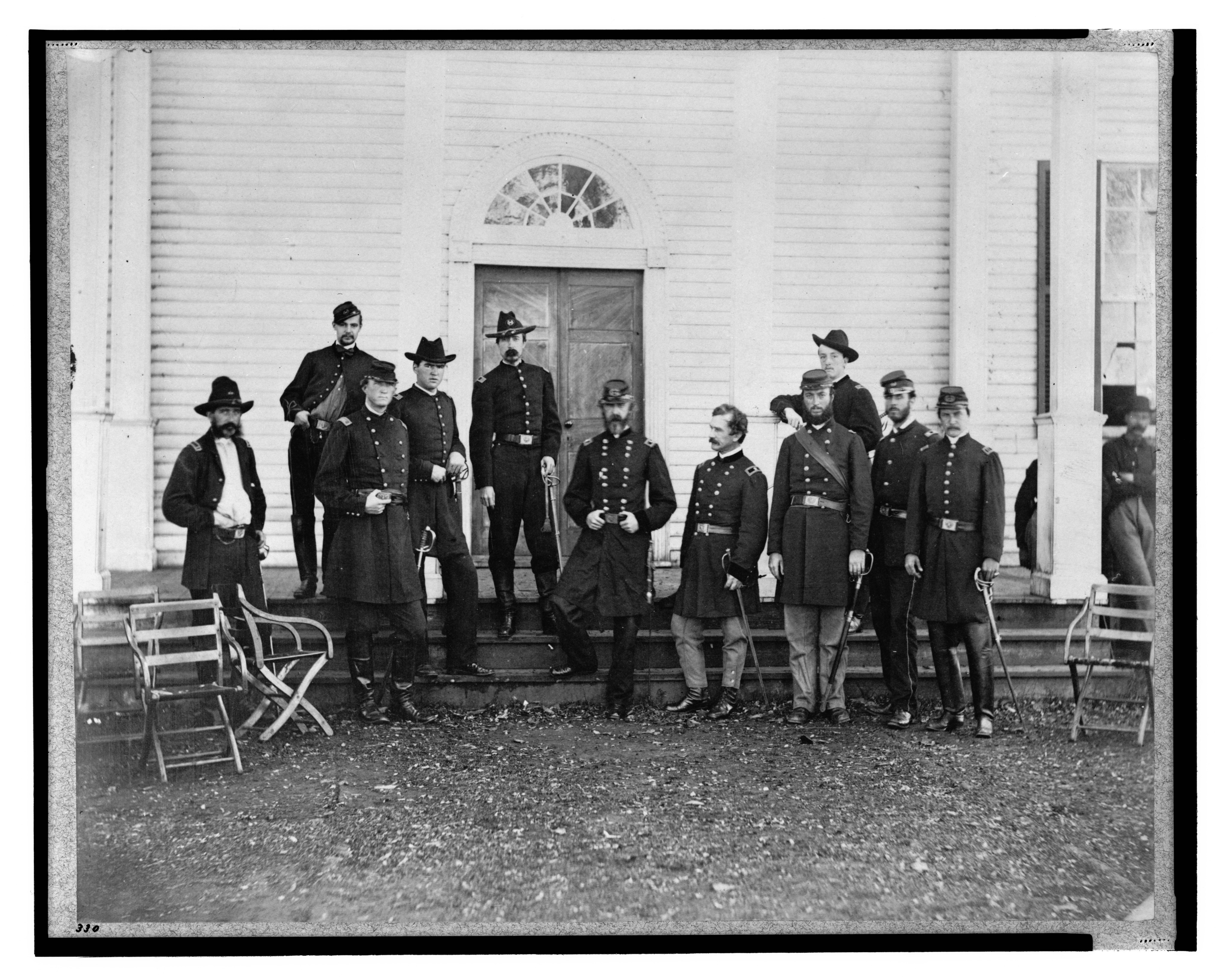
Generals Andrew A. Humphreys, George G. Meade and staff in Culpeper, Virginia, outside Meade's headquarters, 1863

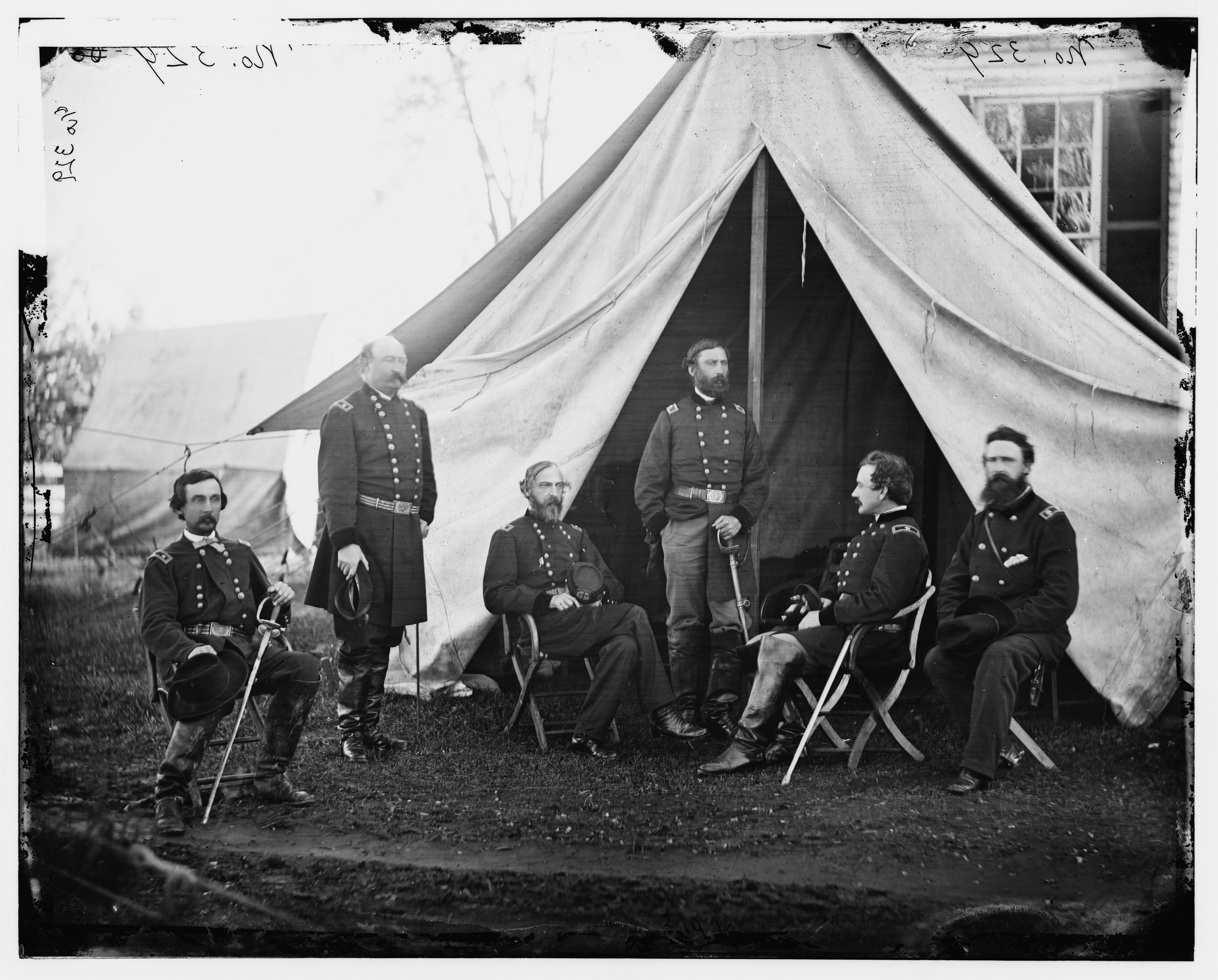
Commanders of the Army of the Potomac, Gouverneur K. Warren, William H. French, George G. Meade, Henry J. Hunt, Andrew A. Humphreys and George Sykes in September 1863

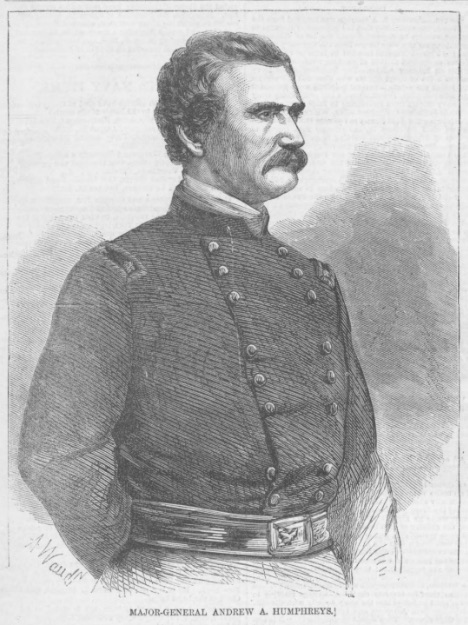
Maj. Gen. Humphreys in Harper's Weekly (Jan. 16, 1864)

At the Battle of Chancellorsville, Humphreys' division was attacked by Colquitt's brigade on the third day of the battle. The nine month regiments were set to go home in May when their enlistment terms expired, so his command ceased to exist a few weeks after Chancellorsville. On May 23, 1863, Humphreys was transferred to the command of the 2nd Division in the III Corps, under Maj. Gen. Daniel E. Sickles. When Meade assumed command of the Army of the Potomac just before the Battle of Gettysburg, he asked Humphreys to be his chief of staff, replacing Maj. Gen. Daniel Butterfield, who was considered to be too close politically to the previous commander, Maj. Gen. Joseph Hooker. Humphreys declined the opportunity to give up his division command. His new division immediately saw action at Gettysburg where, on July 2, 1863, Sickles insubordinately moved his corps from its assigned defensive position on Cemetery Ridge. Humphreys' new position was on the Emmitsburg Road, part of a salient directly in the path of the Confederate assault, and it was too long a front for a single division to defend. Assaulted by the division of Maj. Gen. Lafayette McLaws, Humphreys' three brigades were demolished; Sickles had pulled back Humphreys's reserve brigade to shore up the neighboring division (Maj. Gen. David B. Birney), which was the first to be attacked. Humphreys put up the best fight that could have been expected and was eventually able to reform his survivors on Cemetery Ridge, but his division and the entire corps were finished as a fighting force.

Humphreys was promoted to major general of volunteers on July 8, 1863, and finally acceded to Meade's request to serve as his chief of staff; as his division was decimated in the fighting at Gettysburg. He served in that position through the Bristoe and Mine Run campaigns that fall, and the Overland Campaign and the Siege of Petersburg in 1864, proving one of the best and most dependable generals in the Army of the Potomac during the latter phase of the war. In November 1864, he assumed command of the II Corps after Winfield Hancock was forced to resign for health reasons, which he led for the rest of the siege and during the pursuit of Gen. Robert E. Lee to Appomattox Court House and surrender. On March 13, 1865, he was breveted brigadier general in the regular army and then on May 26, 1865, he was awarded brevet major general in the regular army for "gallant and meritorious service at the battle of Gettysburg" for the Battle of Sayler's Creek during Lee's retreat.

== Postbellum ==
After the war, Humphreys commanded the District of Pennsylvania. He became a permanent brigadier general and Chief of Engineers in 1866. "He oversaw a corps whose personnel—consisting of only about 100 officers and an equal number of civilian assistants—were greatly taxed by the numerous responsibilities heaped upon them. River and harbor work increased from 49 projects and 26 surveys in 1866 to 371 projects and 135 surveys in 1882". He held this position until June 30, 1879, when he retired, serving during this period on lighthouse and other engineering boards.

Humphreys was awarded the honorary degree of LL.D. by Harvard University in 1868. In retirement, he studied philosophy and was one of the incorporators of the National Academy of Sciences. Humphreys's published works were highlighted by the 1861 Report on the Physics and Hydraulics of the Mississippi River, co-authored with Lt. Henry Abbot, which gave him considerable prominence in the scientific community, as the survey was the most extensive to date and introduced novel formulations of the lower river's flow. In 1871, he co-founded the Philosophical Society of Washington, a scientific organization. He also wrote personal accounts of the war, published in 1883: From Gettysburg to the Rapidan and The Virginia Campaign of '64 and '65. He died in Washington, D.C., and is buried there in the Congressional Cemetery.

Camp A. A. Humphreys was formerly named after Humphreys. Humphreys Peak, 12,633', Arizona's highest peak, is named in honor of General A.A. Humphreys.

He is the namesake of Mount Humphreys in Yellowstone National Park in Wyoming.

== See also ==
- List of American Civil War generals (Union)

== Notes ==
Military offices
Preceded by George Meade	Commander of the Fifth Army Corps; February 23, 1863 – February 28, 1863	Succeeded by George Meade
Preceded by Winfield S. Hancock	Commander of the Second Army Corps; November 26, 1864 – February 15, 1865	Succeeded by Gershom Mott
Preceded by Nelson A. Miles	Commander of the Second Army Corps; February 25, 1865 – April 22, 1865	Succeeded by Francis C. Barlow
Preceded by Francis C. Barlow	Commander of the Second Army Corps; May 5, 1865 – June 9, 1865	Succeeded by Gershom Mott
Preceded by Gershom Mott	Commander of the Second Army Corps; June 20, 1865 – June 28, 1865	Succeeded by Army disbanded
Preceded by Richard Delafield	Chief of Engineers; 1866–1879	Succeeded by Horatio Wright
