= Samuel Humphreys =

American naval architect and shipbuilder (1778–1846)

- Born: 23 November 1778
- Died: 16 August 1846 (aged 67)
- Resting place: Congressional Cemetery, Washington, D.C.
- Occupations: Naval architect, shipbuilder

Samuel Humphreys (23 November 1778 – 16 August 1846) was an American naval architect and shipbuilder in the early 19th century. He served the United States Navy as the Chief Constructor for the Navy from 1826 to 1846.

== Naval architect ==
The building of the Frigate Philadelphia, Plate 29 of Birch's Views of Philadelphia (1800). The man standing in the foreground may be a portrait of Humphreys's father.

Samuel Humphreys supervised the construction of the frigate USS Philadelphia, which was laid down at Philadelphia, Pennsylvania, in 1798, and launched in 1799. He later constructed ships at the Philadelphia Navy Yard, and supervised the construction of the ship-of-the-line USS Franklin, the first ship to be laid down at the yard, in 1815.

In 1824, Humphreys turned down a very lucrative offer from Emperor Alexander I of Russia to create a Russian navy, saying: "I do not know that I possess the merits attributed to me, but, be they great or small, I owe them all to the flag of my country."

In 1826, Humpherys was elected a member of the American Philosophical Society.

Humphreys was Chief Constructor for the Navy from 1826 to 1846. He designed America's first first-rate ship-of-the-line, USS Pennsylvania, which was laid down in 1821, but not launched until 1837. He also designed the supply ship USS Relief, which was laid down in 1835 and launched in 1836.

Around 1827, Humphreys took on John Lenthall as his apprentice to work as his assistant and draftsman, and in 1828 he nominated Lenthall for a position as one of the assistant naval constructors at the Philadelphia Navy Yard. Lenthall would go on to serve as Chief Constructor for the Navy from 1849 to 1853 and as Chief of the Navy's Bureau of Construction and Repair from 1853 to 1871.

== Family ==
Humphreys's father was Joshua Humphreys (1751-1838), the naval architect for the first six frigates of the U.S. Navy. Samuel, and his wife Letitia, had sons Andrew (1810-1883) and Joshua (1813–1873) who served in the Union Army and Confederate States Navy, respectively, in the American Civil War (1861-1865). His other children were Jane Murray McCrabb (1813–1897), Mary Yonge (1823–1866), and William Humphreys (1828–1897).

Samuel Humphreys is buried at the Congressional Cemetery in Washington, D.C., with his sons Andrew and Joshua.

== See also ==
- United States naval architect
- Naval architecture
