= Charles W. Morgan (naval officer) =

American Navy officer

- Born: c. 1790; Virginia, U.S.
- Died: 1853 (aged 62–63); Washington, D.C., U.S.
- Military career
- Branch: United States Navy
- Rank: Commodore
- Units: Constitution; Franklin; North Carolina
- Commands: War of 1812

Commodore Charles W. Morgan (c. 1790 – January 5, 1853) was an officer in the United States Navy during the War of 1812.

== Biography ==
Born in Virginia, Morgan served during the War of 1812 as a lieutenant on Constitution during her battle with HMS Guerriere and also served aboard Franklin.

He was promoted to captain in 1831 and commanded 74-gun ship of the line North Carolina. He also served as the commodore of the Mediterranean Squadron.

He should not be confused with Charles Waln Morgan (1796–1861), the original owner of the whaling ship Charles W. Morgan, which is preserved by Mystic Seaport in Stonington, Connecticut.

== Death ==
Morgan died in Washington, D.C., in 1853. He was survived by his wife, Julia.

== Dates of rank ==
- Midshipman - 1 January 1808
- Lieutenant - 3 March 1813
- Master Commandant - 15 April 1820
- Captain - 21 February 1831
