= USS Brandywine =

Sailing frigate of the United States Navy

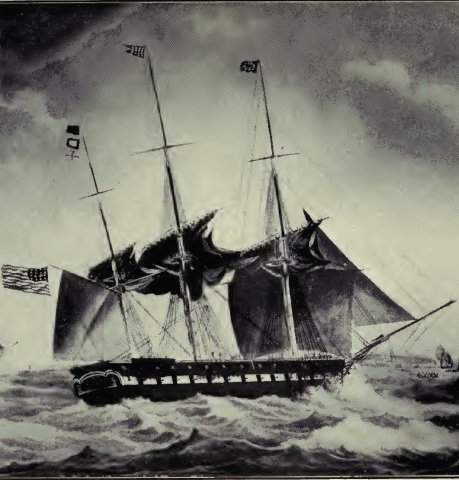
- U.S.S. Brandywine off Malta, November 6, 1831

History

United States
- Name: USS Brandywine
- Namesake: Battle of Brandywine
- Ordered: as Susquehanna
- Builder: Washington Navy Yard
- Laid down: September 20, 1821
- Launched: June 16, 1825
- Commissioned: August 25, 1825
- Out of service: September 3, 1864
- Stricken: 1867 (est.)
- Fate: burned, September 3, 1864; raised and sold March 26, 1867

General characteristics
- Type: frigate
- Tonnage: 1708
- Length: 175 ft (53 m)(between perpendiculars)
- Beam: 45 ft (14 m)
- Draft: 22 ft 4 in (6.81 m)
- Depth of hold: 14 ft 5 in (4.39 m)
- Propulsion: Frigate sail
- Speed: 13 kn (15 mph; 24 km/h)
- Complement: 480 officers and enlisted
- Armament: 30 × 32-pounder guns; 24 × 42-pounder carronades

USS Brandywine (formerly named Susquehanna) was a wooden-hulled, three-masted frigate of the United States Navy bearing 44 guns which had the initial task of conveying the Marquis de Lafayette back to France. She was later recommissioned a number of times for service in various theaters, such as in the Mediterranean, in China and in the South Atlantic Ocean.

During several instances she served as a role player in American gunboat diplomacy, a role she was well suited for with her large long-range 32-pounder guns and her short-range carronades which produced fragmentation and fire damage to the ship fired upon, as well as splinter and shrapnel injury to its crew.

== 1825: Conveying Marquis de Lafayette to France ==
From July 1824 to September 1825, the last surviving French general of the Revolutionary War, the Marquis de Lafayette, made a famous tour of the 24 states in the United States. At many stops on this tour, he was received by the populace with a hero's welcome, and many honors and monuments were presented to commemorate and memorialize Lafayette's visit.

Susquehanna—a 44-gun frigate—was laid down on September 20, 1821, at the Washington Navy Yard. Shortly before she was to be launched in the spring of 1825, President John Quincy Adams decided to have an American warship carry the Marquis de Lafayette back to Europe, in the wake of his visit to the land he had fought to free almost 50 years before.

The general had expressed his intention of sailing for home sometime in the late summer or early autumn of 1825. Adams selected Susquehanna for this honor, and accordingly—as a gesture of the nation's affection for Lafayette—the frigate was renamed Brandywine to commemorate the Battle of Brandywine, in which Lafayette was wounded fighting with American forces. Launched on June 16, 1825, and christened by Sailing Master Marmaduke Dove, Brandywine was commissioned on August 25, 1825, Captain Charles Morris in command.

As an honor to the Marquis, officers were selected from as many U.S. states as possible and, where practicable, from descendants of persons who had distinguished themselves in the American Revolution. One of these young men selected as an officer on the Brandywine's maiden voyage was 19-year-old Virginian Matthew Fontaine Maury, who would eventually have a great influence on the science of oceanography.

After fitting out at the Navy Yard, the frigate traveled down the Potomac River to await her passenger at St. Mary's, Maryland, not far from the river's mouth. Lafayette enjoyed a last state dinner to celebrate his 68th birthday on the evening of September 6, and then embarked in the steamboat Mount Vernon on September 7 for the trip downriver to join Brandywine. On September 8, the frigate stood out of the Potomac River and sailed down Chesapeake Bay toward the open ocean.

After a stormy three weeks at sea, the warship arrived off Le Havre, France, early in October; and, following some initial trepidation about the government's attitude toward Lafayette's return to a France now ruled by the ultra-royalist King Charles X, Brandywine's passenger and her captain disembarked, the former to return home and the latter to tour the country for six months to study shipyards, ship design and other naval matters.

== 1825: European operations ==
Brandywine left Le Havre that same day to join the United States' Mediterranean Squadron. En route, she stopped at Cowes on the Isle of Wight in England to re-caulk seams that had opened rather badly during the Atlantic crossing.

Then, after being rendered more seaworthy, she resumed her voyage to Gibraltar on October 22, reaching the famed British bastion guarding the Mediterranean Sea's Atlantic entrance on November 2. At the end of a fortnight in port, Brandywine sailed for the Balearic Islands in company with the ship of the line North Carolina and sloop of war Erie. Following an 11-day passage, the trio reached Port Mahon, Minorca; and Brandywine spent the next three months refitting.

In February 1826, Porpoise arrived in Port Mahon with orders recalling Brandywine to the U.S., and the frigate set sail for home late in the month. She stopped at Gibraltar early in March and finally entered New York Harbor in mid-April.

== 1826: Pacific Ocean operations ==
After passing the rest of spring and much of the summer in repairs and outfitting for duty in the Pacific Ocean, Brandywine departed New York City on September 3, 1826, as the flagship of Commodore Jacob Jones who was sailing around Cape Horn for the Pacific coast of South America to take over command of the American squadron in the region from Commodore Isaac Hull and his flagship, USS United States. She also carried a relief crew for the schooner Dolphin that had been slated to remain on the Pacific Station.

By the time the frigate joined the squadron on January 6, 1827, Spain had abandoned her efforts to re-conquer her empire in the Western Hemisphere, so Brandywine's tour of duty in the Pacific proved far less troubled than that of her predecessor. She directed her efforts to protecting American citizens, especially merchant seamen who were being impressed into service by the Peruvian Navy.

Her own relief—the frigate Guerriere—arrived in the summer of 1829 bringing Commodore Charles C. B. Thompson, the squadron's new commander, along with another crew for Dolphin; and Brandywine set sail for home. She reached New York City on October 8 and was decommissioned soon thereafter.

== 1830: Gunboat diplomacy in Europe ==
Placed back in commission on January 10, 1830, Capt. Henry E. Ballard in command, the warship set out for the Gulf of Mexico two months later to gather information concerning conditions in that area. She returned to the east coast at Norfolk, Virginia on July 7 and began preparations for another European deployment.

Brandywine departed Hampton Roads, Virginia on October 22, 1830, and headed for Gibraltar. At first, this deployment was devoted almost exclusively to sailing from one peaceful port to the next, showing the flag to maintain and enhance American prestige. However, President Andrew Jackson—determined to collect indemnities owed to the U.S. for merchant ships that had been confiscated by several European nations while under Napoleon Bonaparte's governments during the Napoleonic Wars—decided to begin with the Kingdom of Naples.

While Napoleon's brother, Joseph Bonaparte, sat on the throne there, Naples had seized several American merchantmen; and the most recent successor to the throne, King Ferdinand II, had repudiated the debts. Jackson sent former Maryland congressman John Nelson to Naples as U.S. minister to negotiate the payment of these debts.

He also dispatched Commodore Daniel Patterson to the Mediterranean with reinforcements for the squadron already there and with orders to take overall command of American forces from Commodore James Biddle. The frigate gave a physical dimension to Nelson's legal arguments.

== 1832: Demonstrating American firepower ==
When Nelson first raised the issue of the debts, King Ferdinand refused even to consider the question. This prompted the American minister to write to Commodore Patterson asking for naval support.

The commodore divided his squadron into two groups. The first contingent—headed by Brandywine and including Constellation—reached Naples on July 23, 1832, and anchored near Ferdinand's palace. This group remained in port until late in August when it returned to Port Mahon. Beginning with Concord, that arrived on September 17, however, the ships of the second contingent began standing into the harbor at Naples singly. Soon, the frigate United States arrived, followed in rapid succession by John Adams and Boston.

Not a shot was fired and no explicit reference to the squadron was made during the negotiations; nevertheless, the unspoken message of power helped the king to see the justice of the American claims and prompted him to sign a treaty promising to pay 2,100,000 ducats to the U.S. over the next nine years. Her remaining months in the Mediterranean proved less dramatic; and Brandywine sailed for the United States late in the spring of 1833, returning to New York on July 9 and going out of commission two days later.

== 1834: Pacific Ocean operations ==
Reactivated in the spring of 1834, on April 4, Capt. David Deacon in command, and set sail on June 2 to replace Vincennes as the flagship of the Pacific Squadron. She reached Rio de Janeiro, Brazil on July 22 and stayed until August 14, when she resumed her journey down the coast and around Cape Horn.

Brandywine arrived at Valparaíso on October 3 after a stormy passage of the cape, and Commodore Alexander S. Wadsworth broke his flag in her on November 1. For the next three years, the warship plied the waters along South America's west coast protecting U.S. citizens and commerce. On November 3, 1836, she collided with the Peruvian ship Limena off Callao, Peru, while Limena was on a voyage from Callao to Igargue, Peru; Limena suffered severe damage and put back into Callao for repairs.

Finally, expiring enlistments signaled the time for Brandywine to sail for home, and she departed Callao in January 1837, bringing Commodore Wadsworth back home at the conclusion of his own tour of duty. After a relatively quiet 94-day passage, she reached Norfolk, Virginia, on April 22, 1837, and was placed in ordinary on May 9, 1837.

== 1839: The Caroline incident ==
After being laid up for more than two years, the frigate was recommissioned on August 2, 1839, Capt. William C. Bolton in command; and, once outfitted, sailed for the Mediterranean on October 22.

This cruise was enlivened by tension with Great Britain over the Caroline incident. In 1837, when many people in the United States had sympathized with Canadian rebels, some Canadian loyalists had captured the steamboat Caroline from the American side of the Niagara River. In November 1840, a Canadian had been arrested and charged with murder in Lewiston, New York, after drunkenly boasting that he had taken part in the cutting out of Caroline and had killed an American.

Feelings on both sides of the Atlantic deepened during the spring of 1841, and the American minister to the Court of St. James's wrote to Commodore Hull urging him to leave the Mediterranean lest war break out and his squadron be trapped there.

== 1841: Avoiding war with Britain ==
Upon receiving this warning, Hull ordered his ships to get underway and head for Gibraltar. Not knowing what faced them when they reached the strait, Brandywine and her consorts were prepared for the worst. Steady pilots manned the helms on both sides, and peace persisted unbroken when the warship passed the strait and entered the Atlantic Ocean.

The frigate continued on westward and entered New York Harbor on May 12, 1841. Later that summer, the crisis with Great Britain abated somewhat, and Brandywine headed back to the Mediterranean on June 29. She completed her originally scheduled tour there under the command of Capt. David Greisinger and then returned to New York on July 12, 1842, to be decommissioned on July 30, 1842.

== 1843: China operations ==
Brandywine went back into commission on February 16, 1843, Lieutenant Charles W. Chauncey in command, and set sail for the East Indies on 24 May. After rounding the Cape of Good Hope, she reached Bombay, India on October 24 to pick up the special envoy to China, Caleb Cushing, and took him to Macau where he went ashore and began negotiations for a treaty. While Cushing was working to develop contacts with the Chinese government, Brandywine visited Manila, Hong Kong and Whampoa. On June 16, 1844, the high commissioner appointed by the Chinese emperor to deal with Cushing, Ch'i-ying, arrived at Macau; and negotiations opened on the 21st.

Following 12 days of discussions, the Treaty of Wanghia was signed on July 3 providing for the establishment of five American treaty ports in China. It also granted protection to American sailors shipwrecked on Chinese shores and guaranteed that both civil and criminal law cases involving Americans would be adjudicated in consular courts. In effect, the treaty extended to the U.S. the privileges granted to Britain in the Treaty of Nanking which ended the First Opium War. It also granted Chinese officials the power to confiscate American ships operating outside treaty ports and withdrew consular protection in cases in which US citizens were trading in opium.

Cushing set sail in the brig Perry on August 29 to return to the U.S. with the new treaty. Brandywine, on the other hand, remained in the Orient until departing Macau for Honolulu, Hawaii on December 2, carrying word of the Chinese privy council's approval of the treaty. From Hawaii, she sailed to the west coast of South America where she made calls at several ports before setting out to double Cape Horn on her way home. At the end of a long and successful cruise, Brandywine stood into Norfolk, Virginia on September 17, 1845, and was decommissioned there eight days later.

== 1847: Brazil Station operations ==
After nearly two years in ordinary, the frigate was recommissioned once more on August 30, 1847, Capt. Thomas Crabbe in command. On September 13, Brandywine set sail for the Brazil Station where she cruised for more than three years protecting United States interests in the region. The warship then returned to the United States at New York City on December 4, 1850, and was decommissioned 10 days later.

== 1861: American Civil War operations ==
Laid up in ordinary for more than a decade, Brandywine finally resumed active service as a result of the American Civil War. She was recommissioned at the New York Navy Yard on October 27, 1861, Commander Benjamin J. Totten in command, and set sail immediately for Hampton Roads, Virginia, where she arrived on October 29.

Housed over and converted to a storeship, the former warship supported the operations of the North Atlantic Blockading Squadron for almost three years. She spent much of that time anchored near Fort Monroe, her most conspicuous absence coming in the wake of CSS Virginia's attempt to break the Union blockade early in the spring of 1862.

Towed to Baltimore, Maryland by Mount Vernon, Brandywine remained there until early June 1862, by which time the danger posed by the Confederate ironclad had waned considerably. Later moved to Norfolk, she also assumed the role of receiving ship for the squadron.

== 1864: Brandywine sinks at her moorings ==
She remained so employed until a fire broke out in her paint locker on September 3, 1864, and destroyed her. She sank at her moorings at Norfolk but was later raised and sold to Maltby & Co., of Norfolk on March 26, 1867.

== Note ==
Brandywine is notable as the final evolution of the 44-gun frigate design that began by USS Constitution and her sisters a quarter-century earlier; while ships such as Raritan were launched in the 1840s and differed in details, their basic design was identical to Brandywine. Brandywine was also the very first warship ever built with an innovative elliptical stern which reduced the chronic vulnerability of the traditional square stern ship to enemy fire and allowed her to carry stern-mounted guns.
