= USS Franklin (1815) =

74-gun ship of the line

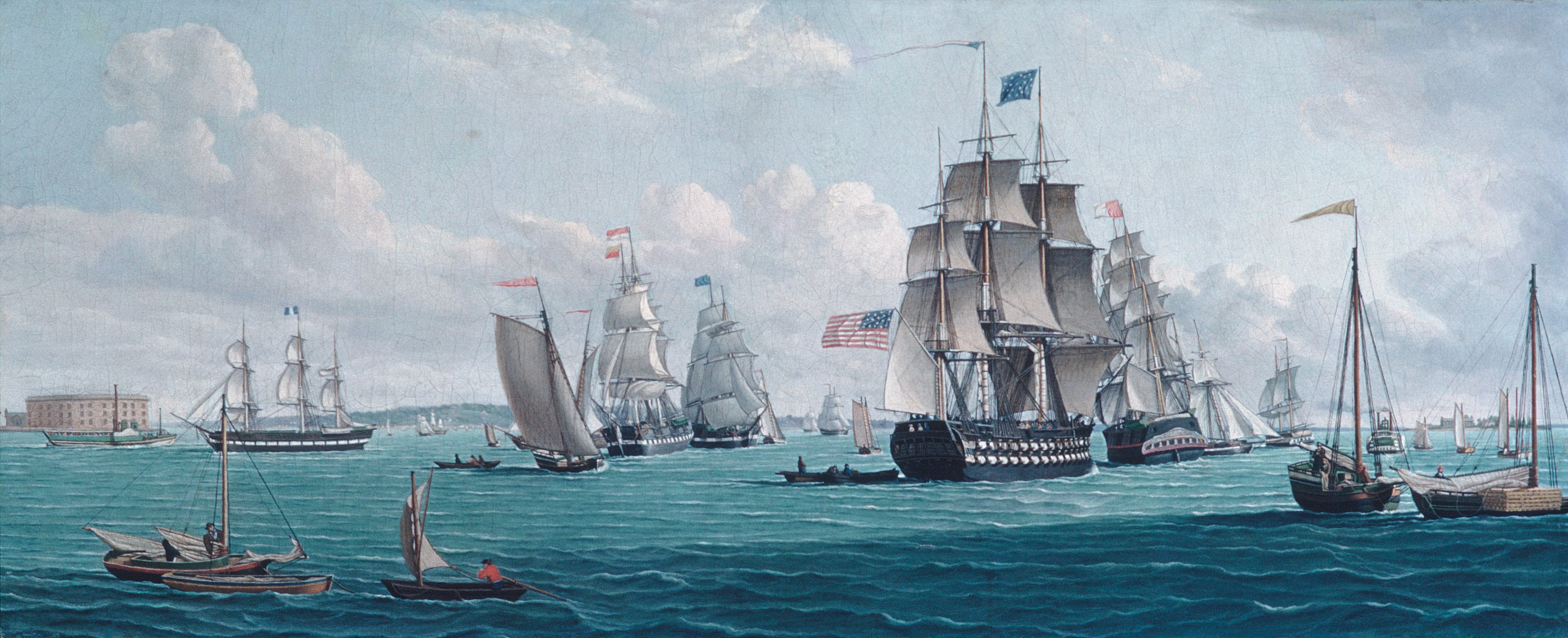
- 1820 painting of Franklin (center-right) in New York Bay

History

United States
- Name: USS Franklin
- Namesake: Benjamin Franklin
- Builder: Philadelphia Navy Yard
- Laid down: 1815
- Launched: August 1815
- Commissioned: before 14 October 1817
- Fate: Broken up, 1852

General characteristics
- Type: Ship of the line
- Tonnage: 2243
- Length: 190 ft 9 in (58.14 m)
- Beam: 54 ft 7 in (16.64 m)
- Draft: 24 ft 3 in (7.39 m)
- Armament: 30 × long 32-pounder guns; 32 × medium 32-pounder guns; 24 × 32-pounder carronades

USS Franklin was a 74-gun ship of the line of the United States Navy. She was named for Founding Father Benjamin Franklin.

== Construction ==
Built in 1815 under the supervision of Samuel Humphreys and Charles Penrose she was the first vessel to be laid down at the Philadelphia Navy Yard. She was superintended by her commander Captain John Smith, who died before or right around her launch in August 1815.

== Description ==
This is the description of USS Franklin from Journal of Hezekiah Loomis:

A frigate of 74 guns, launched with bowsprit, drawing 13.6 forward and 17.2 aft. When equipped for sea her lower deck ports amidships were within 4 feet of the water. In commission, 1815; 188 feet long; 50 feet beam; 20 feet hold.

== Service ==
Franklin sailed on her first cruise on 14 October 1817, when under the command of Master Commandant H. E. Ballard she proceeded from Philadelphia to the Mediterranean. She carried the Hon. Richard Rush, U.S. Minister to England, to his post. Subsequently, she was designated flagship of the Mediterranean Squadron, cruising on that station until March 1820. She returned to New York City on 24 April 1820.

From 11 October 1821 until 29 August 1824 she served as flagship on the Pacific Squadron. Franklin was laid up in ordinary until the summer of 1838 when she was ordered to Boston as a receiving ship. She continued in this capacity until 1852 at which time she was taken to Portsmouth, New Hampshire, razed and broken up.

Parts from her were used in the construction of her successor, the screw frigate USS Franklin, launched in 1864.
