= USS North Carolina (1820) =

Ship of the line

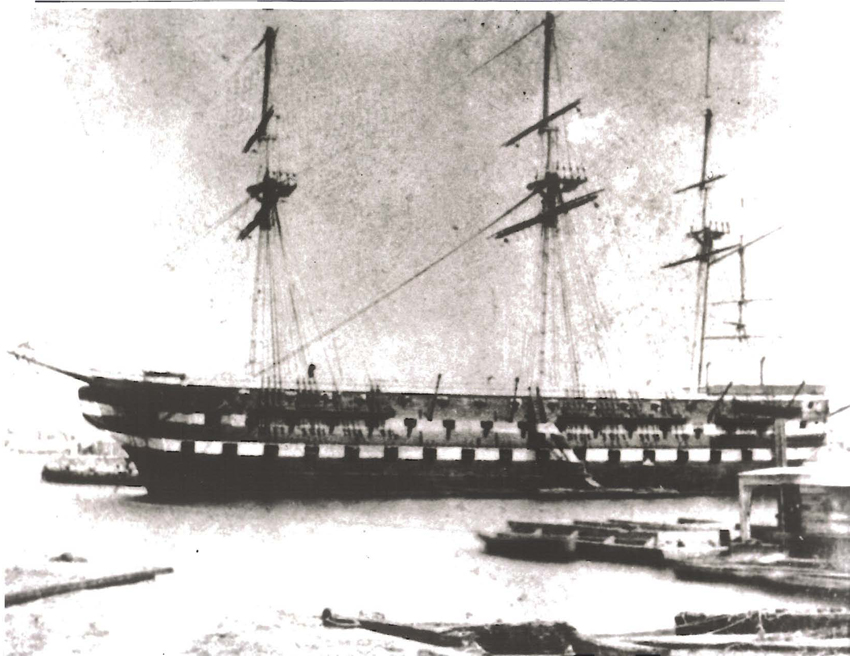

History

United States
- Name: USS North Carolina
- Namesake: North Carolina
- Ordered: 29 April 1816
- Builder: William Doughty (United States naval architect) Philadelphia Navy Yard
- Laid down: 1818
- Launched: 7 September 1820
- Commissioned: 24 June 1824
- Decommissioned: 1866
- Fate: sold, 1 October 1867

General characteristics
- Type: Ship of the line
- Tonnage: 2633
- Length: 196 ft (60 m)
- Beam: 53.6 ft (16.3 m)
- Draft: 21.6 ft (6.6 m)
- Propulsion: Sail
- Complement: 820 officers and men
- Armament: 74 guns, 42 and 32 pounders (19 and 15 kg)

USS North Carolina was a 74-gun ship of the line in the United States Navy. One of the "nine ships to rate not less than 74 guns each" authorized by Congress on 29 April 1816, she was laid down in 1818 by the Philadelphia Navy Yard, launched on 7 September 1820, and fitted out in the Norfolk Navy Yard. Master Commandant Charles W. Morgan was assigned to North Carolina as her first commanding officer on 24 June 1824.

While nominally a 74-gun ship, a popular size at the time, North Carolina was actually pierced (had gunports) for 102 guns, and probably originally mounted ninety-four 42-pounder (19 kg) and 32-pounder (15 kg) cannons. In 1845, she had fifty-six 42-pounders (19 kg), twenty-six 32-pounders (15 kg), and eight 8 in (200 mm) cannons, a total of ninety.

The North Carolina served in the Mediterranean as flagship for Commodore John Rodgers from 29 April 1825 to 18 May 1827. In the early days of the Republic, as today, a display of naval might brought a nation prestige and enhanced its commerce. This proved to be the case when Rodgers's squadron laid the groundwork for the 1830 commercial treaty with Turkey, opening ports of the Eastern Mediterranean and the Black Sea to American traders.

After a period in ordinary at Norfolk, North Carolina decommissioned on 30 October 1836 to fit out for the Pacific Squadron, the one other area where ships of her vast size could be employed. Only the Mediterranean and the western coast of South America at that time offered ports which could accommodate ships of great draft. Again flagship of her station, flying the pennant of Commodore Henry E. Ballard, North Carolina reached Callao, Peru, on 26 May 1837. With the War of the Confederation raging between Chile and Peru, and relations between the United States and Mexico strained, North Carolina protected the important American commerce of the eastern Pacific until March 1839. Since her great size made her less flexible than smaller ships, she returned to the New York Navy Yard in June, and served as a receiving ship. During the American Civil War, African Nova Scotian sailor Benjamin Jackson was assigned to this ship before being transferred to the West Gulf Blockading Squadron. The North Carolina was placed in ordinary in 1866. She was sold while at New York on 1 October 1867.

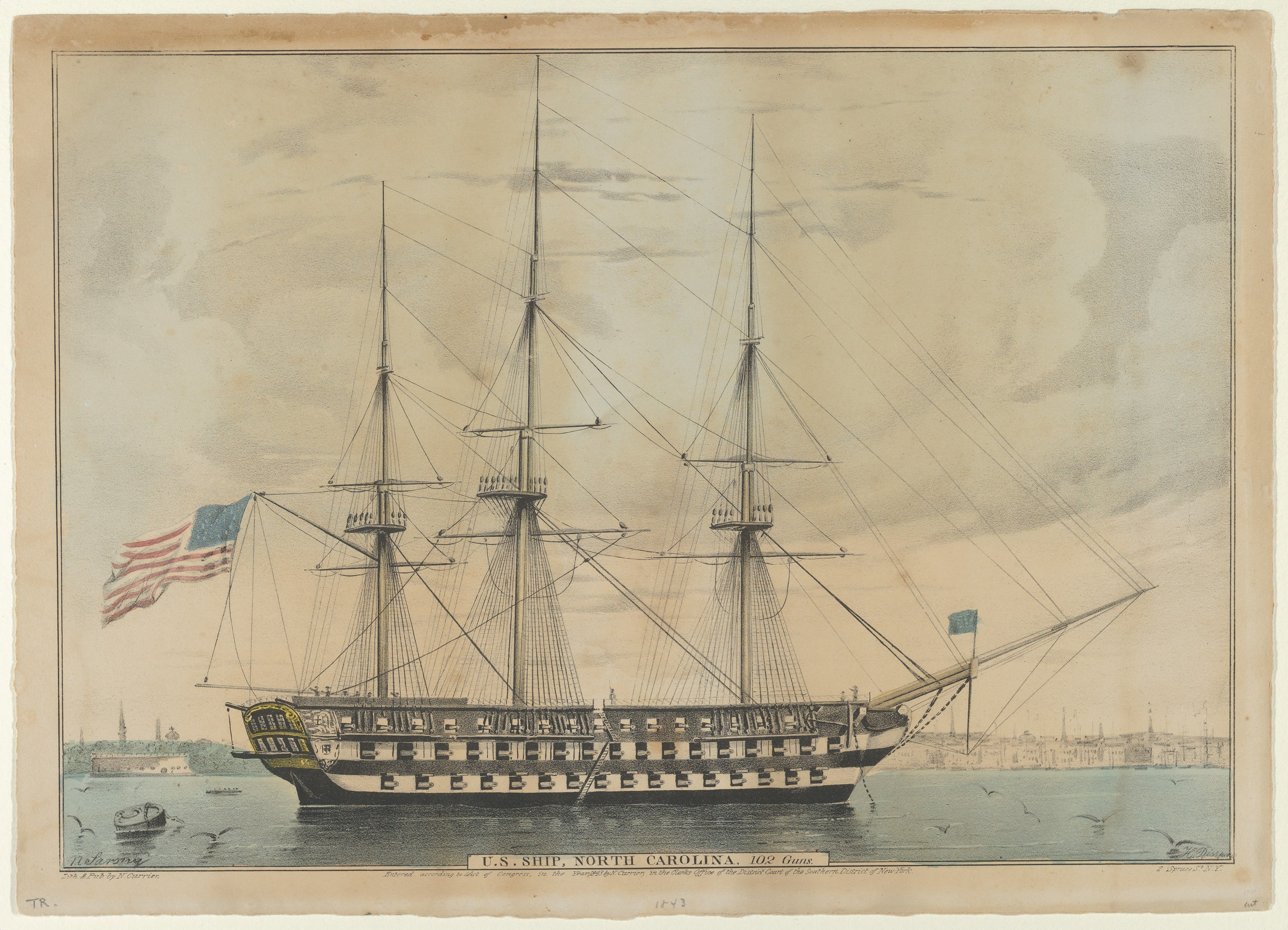
Lithograph of North Carolina, 1842. Currently in the collection of the Metropolitan Museum of Art

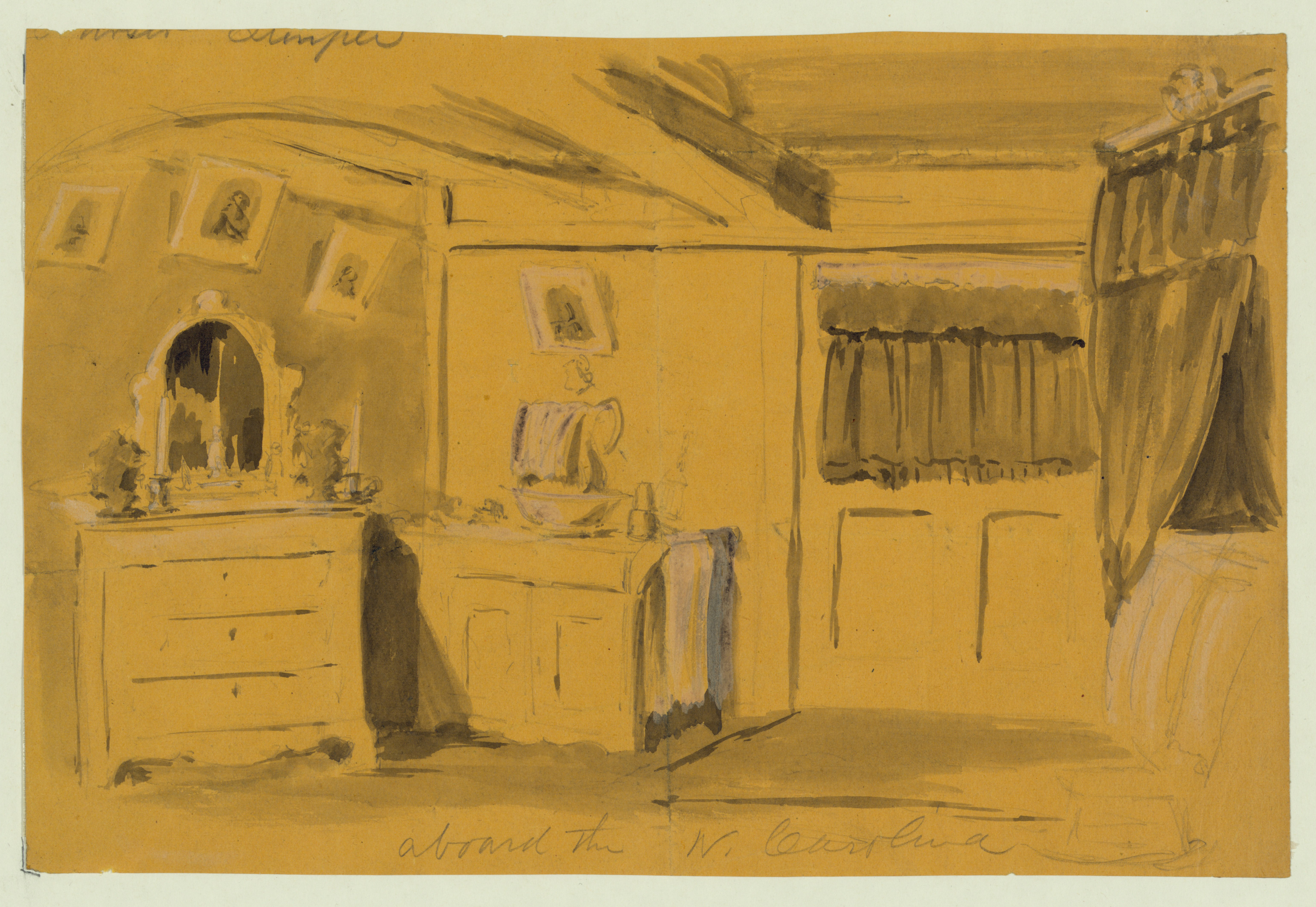
Aboard the N. Carolina (1863 drawing by
Alfred R. Waud)
