= USS Independence (1814) =

1814 three-masted ship of the United States Navy

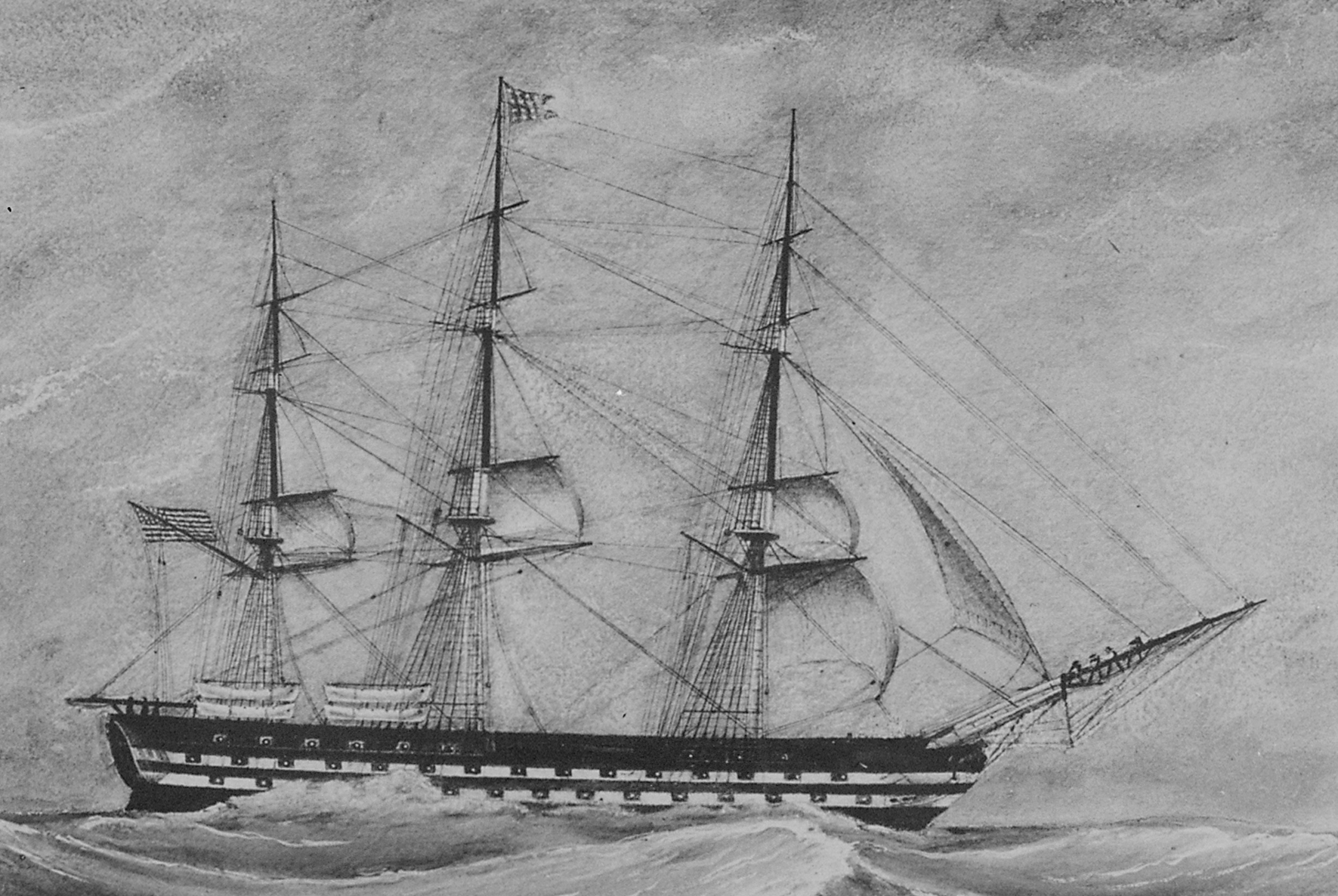

History

United States
- Name: USS Independence
- Namesake: Declaration of Independence
- Builder: Boston Navy Yard
- Launched: 22 June 1814
- Decommissioned: 1822
- Refit: Razeed, 1836
- Recommissioned: 26 March 1837
- Decommissioned: 3 November 1912
- Stricken: 3 September 1913
- Fate: Scrapped 1915

General characteristics
- Type: Ship of the line
- Tonnage: 2243
- Length: 190 ft 9 in (58.14 m)
- Beam: 54 ft 7 in (16.64 m)
- Draft: 21 ft 3 in (6.48 m)
- Propulsion: Sail
- Complement: 790 officers and enlisted
- Armament: 90 × 32-pounder (15 kg) guns

USS Independence was a wooden-hulled, three-masted ship, originally a ship of the line and the first to be commissioned by the United States Navy. Originally a 90-gun ship, in 1836 she was cut down by one deck and re-rated as a 54-gun frigate.

== Service history ==
=== Mediterranean Fleet, 1814–1822 ===
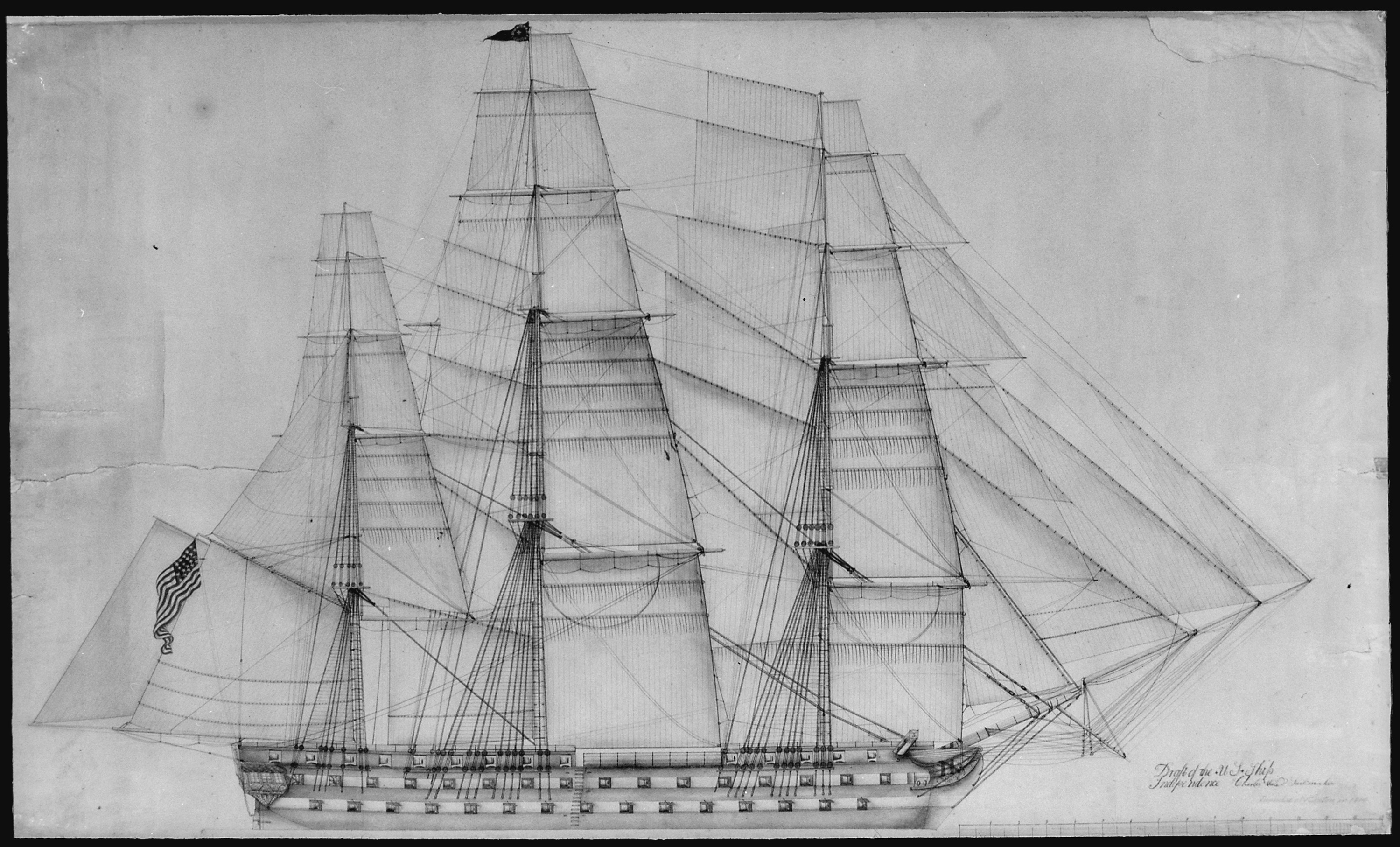
Master sailmaker's plan of USS Independence

Launched on 22 June 1814 in the Boston Navy Yard, she immediately took on guns and was stationed with frigate USS Constitution in Boston. She could not cruise until the end of the War of 1812 as she was blockaded in port by a British squadron consisting of a number of 74-gun ships and the 98-gun HMS Boyne. Flying the broad pennant of Commodore William Bainbridge, and under command of Captain William M. Crane, she led her squadron from Boston on 3 July 1815 to deal with piratical acts of the Barbary States against American merchant commerce.

Peace had been enforced by a squadron under Stephen Decatur by the time Independence arrived in the Mediterranean. But she led an impressive show of American naval might before Barbary ports that encouraged them to keep the peace treaties concluded. Having served adequate notice of rising U.S. seapower and added to the prestige of the Navy and the Nation, Independence returned to Newport, Rhode Island on 15 November 1815. She continued to wear the pennant of Commodore Bainbridge at Boston until 29 November 1819, then was flagship of Commodore John Shaw until placed in ordinary in 1822.

=== Refit 1836 ===
Independence remained in ordinary at Boston until 1836 when she was razeed (cut down to one covered fighting deck with poop and forecastle). She was rated down to 54 guns as her configuration gave way to that of a very large frigate. She proved to be one of the fastest and most powerful "frigates" of the Navy.

=== Russia, South America, Home Squadron, 1837–1845 ===
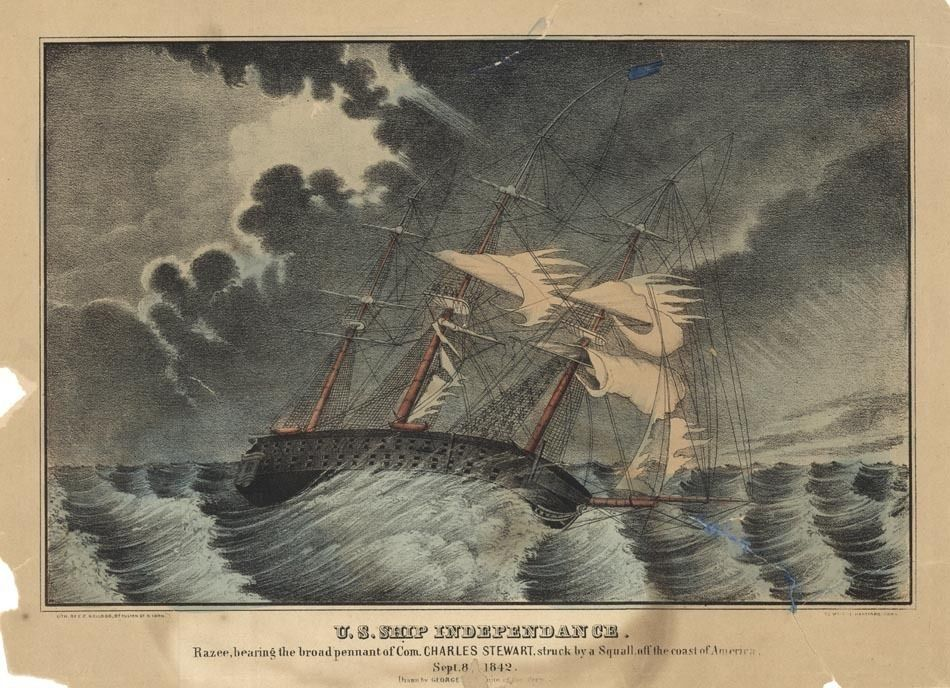
Lithograph of U.S. Ship Independance [sic] struck by a squall off the coast of America, 8 Sept. 1842. Razee, bearing the broad pennant of Com. Charles Stewart.

Independence recommissioned on 26 March 1837 and sailed from Boston on 20 May 1837 as flagship of Commodore John B. Nicholson. On board for her record passage across the Atlantic Ocean to England was the Honorable George Dallas, Minister to Russia. She arrived at Portsmouth, England, 13 June, called at Copenhagen; then proceeded into Kronstadt 29 July 1837 to receive a visit from the Emperor Nicholas I of Russia. Two days later a steam boat arrived to transport Mr. Dallas and his family to St. Petersburg.

Having received marked social courtesies from the Russian government, Independence departed Kronstadt on 13 August 1837 for Rio de Janeiro, where she became flagship of the Brazil Squadron to guard American commerce along the eastern seaboard of South America. This duty continued into the spring of 1839 when Commodore Nicholson attempted mediation to end the war between France and Argentina. He reported 22 April 1839 that:

"I volunteered, as I conceived it a duty I owed to my Country, as well as to all Neutrals, to endeavor to get peace restored that commerce should be allowed to take its usual course. In accordance of the feelings of humanity at least, I hope my endeavors will be approved by the Department . . . I see no probable termination of this War and Blockade which is so injurious to the Commerce of all Neutrals ... "

Independence returned north to New York on 30 March 1840. She was laid up in ordinary until 14 May 1842 when she became flagship of Commodore Charles Stewart in the Home Squadron. Based at Boston and New York, she continued as his flagship until laid up in ordinary on 3 December 1845.

=== Mexican War, 1846–1849 ===
She recommissioned on 4 August 1846, and the nation was already at war with Mexico as she departed Boston 29 August 1846 for the coast of California. She entered Monterey Bay on 22 January 1847 and became the flagship of Commodore William Shubrick, commanding the Pacific Squadron.

Independence assisted in the blockade of the Mexican coast, capturing Mexican ship Correo and a launch on 16 May 1847. She was present to support the capture of Guaymas on 19 October and landed sailors and Marines to occupy Mazatlán on 11 November 1847. She later cruised as far as Hawaii, arriving Hilo on 12 August 1848, arriving Lahaina on 30 August 1848 and Honolulu 4 September 1848. Independence returned to the East Coast at Norfolk, Virginia on 23 May 1849 and decommissioned there on 30 May.

=== Mediterranean, Pacific, 1849–1912 ===
Recommissioned on 7 July 1849, Independence departed Norfolk on 26 July under Captain Thomas Conover to serve as flagship of the Mediterranean Squadron under Commodore Charles Morgan. She was the first U.S. man-of-war to show the flag at Spezia, Italy, arriving on 23 May 1850 to an enthusiastic welcome. She returned to Norfolk on 25 June 1852 and was placed in ordinary at New York on 3 July 1852.

Independence was recommissioned in September 1854 and departed New York on 10 October to serve as flagship of the Pacific Squadron under Commodore William Mervine. She arrived Valparaíso, Chile, on 2 February 1855. Her cruising grounds ranged northward to San Francisco and west to Hawaii. Proceeding from Panama Bay, she entered the Mare Island Navy Yard on 2 October 1857. She served as receiving ship there until decommissioned on 3 November 1912. Her name was struck from the Navy List on 3 September 1913.

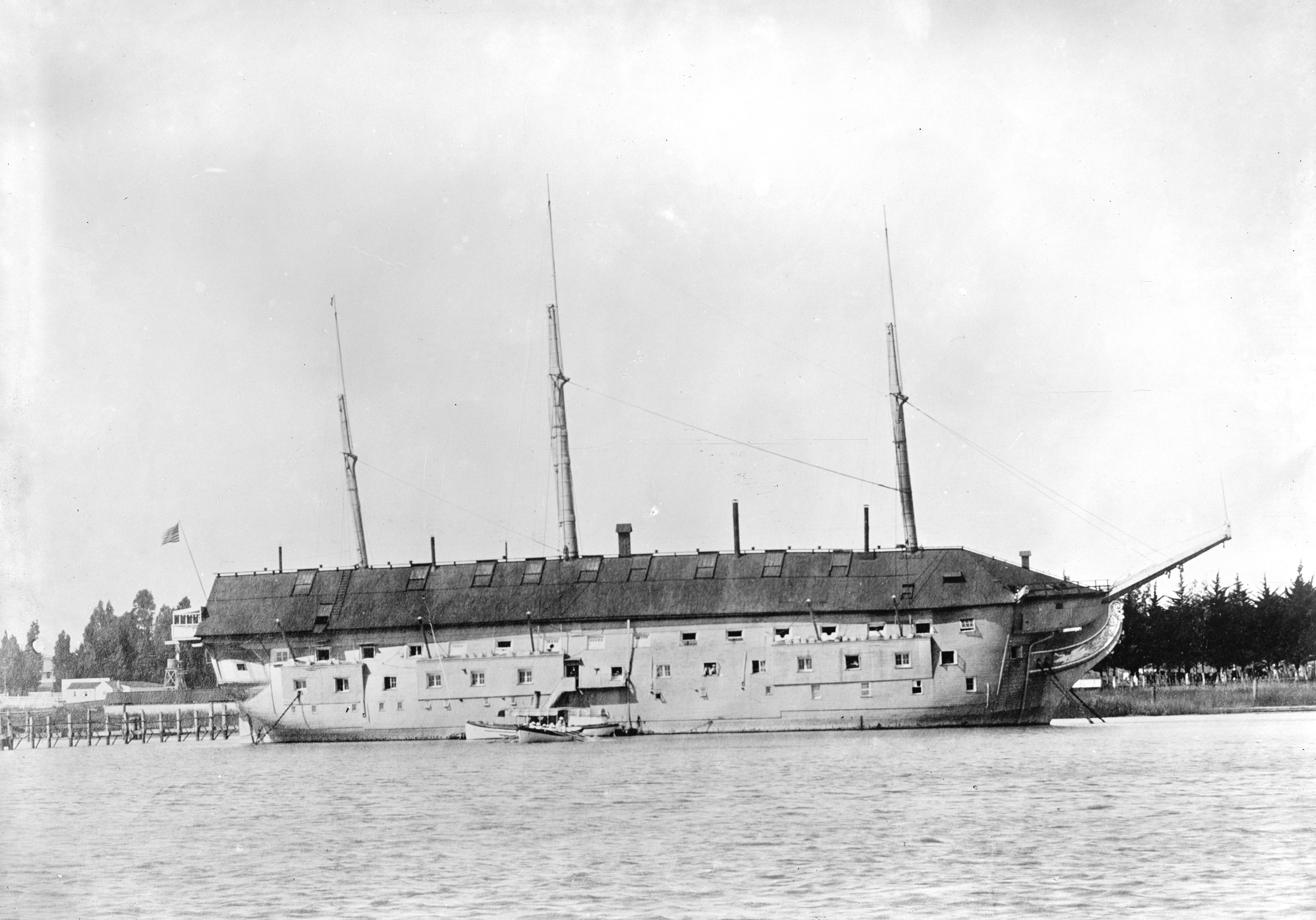
Independence at Mare Island Navy Yard in the 1890s.

=== Decommissioning and fate ===
Independence did not leave the Mare Island Navy Yard until 28 November 1914. Sold to John H. Rinder, she was towed to the Union Iron Works, San Francisco. On 5 March 1915 she shifted to Hunters Point, and remained for a week. Some repairs were made and a plan formulated to use her as a restaurant for the Panama–Pacific International Exposition. But this plan was not executed though a permit was granted by Exposition authorities. Pig iron and ballast were removed from her hold and valuable hard wood salvaged from her orlop deck knees. On the night of 20 September 1915, Independence was burned on the Hunter's Point mud flats to recover her metal fittings.
