= USS Pennsylvania (1837) =

Ship of the line

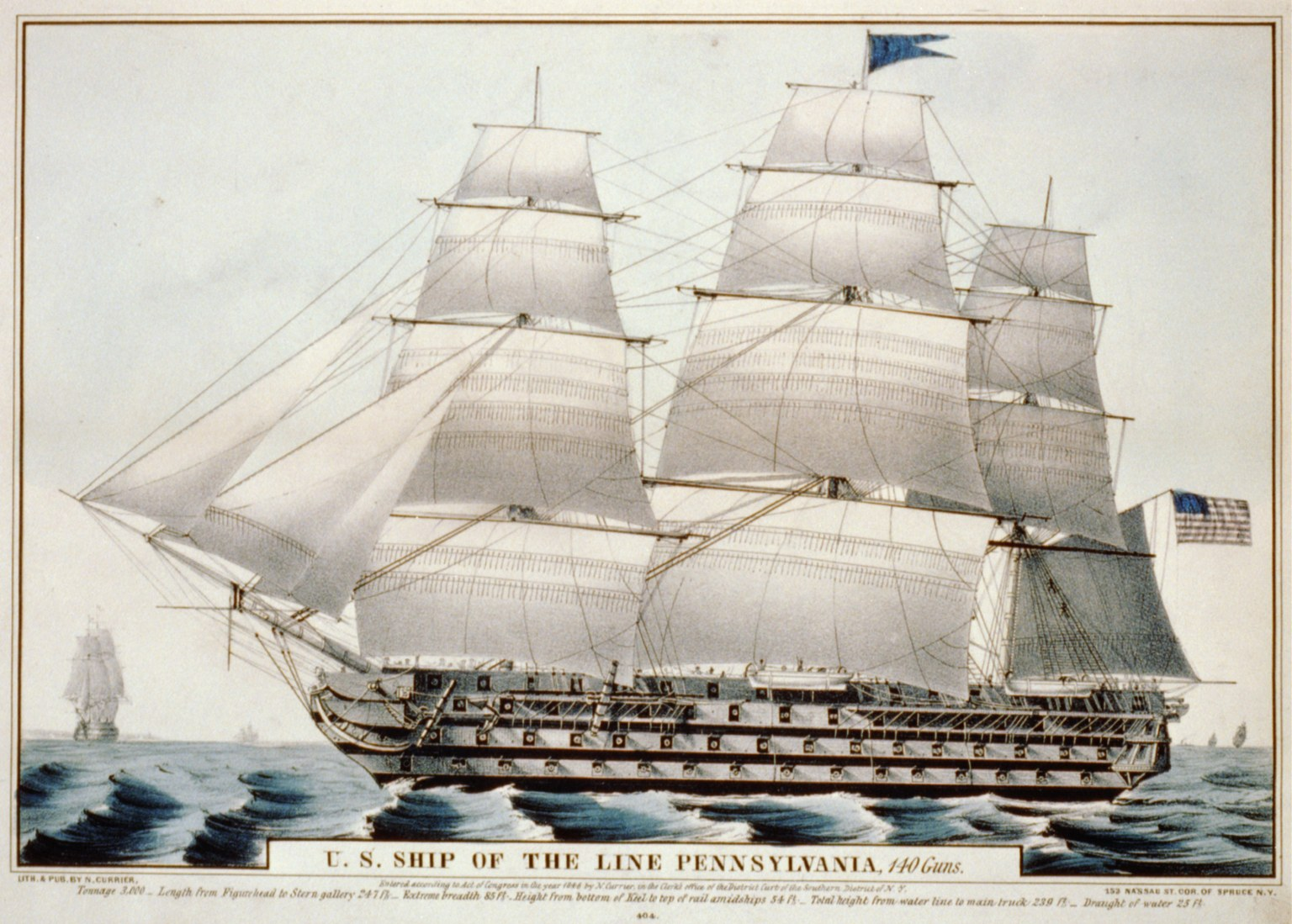
- An 1846 lithography of the USS Pennsylvania by Currier and Ives

History
- Name: USS Pennsylvania
- Namesake: Commonwealth of Pennsylvania
- Ordered: 29 April 1816
- Builder: Philadelphia Naval Shipyard
- Cost: $687,026 (exclusive of armament)
- Laid down: September 1821
- Launched: 18 July 1837
- Commissioned: late 1837
- Fate: Burned, 20 April 1861, wreck salvaged and scrapped, late 1860s

General characteristics
- Tonnage: 3,241 tons burden
- Length: 210 ft (64 m)
- Beam: 56 ft 9 in (17.30 m)
- Depth of hold: 24 ft 4 in (7.42 m)
- Sail plan: ship rig
- Complement: 1,100 officers and men
- Armament: 130 × 32-pounder (15 kg) guns

USS Pennsylvania was a three-decked ship of the line of the United States Navy, rated at 130 guns, and named for the state of Pennsylvania. She was the largest United States sailing warship ever built, the equivalent of a first-rate of the British Royal Navy. Authorized in 1816 and launched in 1837, her only cruise was a single trip from Delaware Bay through the Chesapeake Bay to the Norfolk Navy Yard. The ship became a receiving ship, and, during the American Civil War, was destroyed.

== History ==
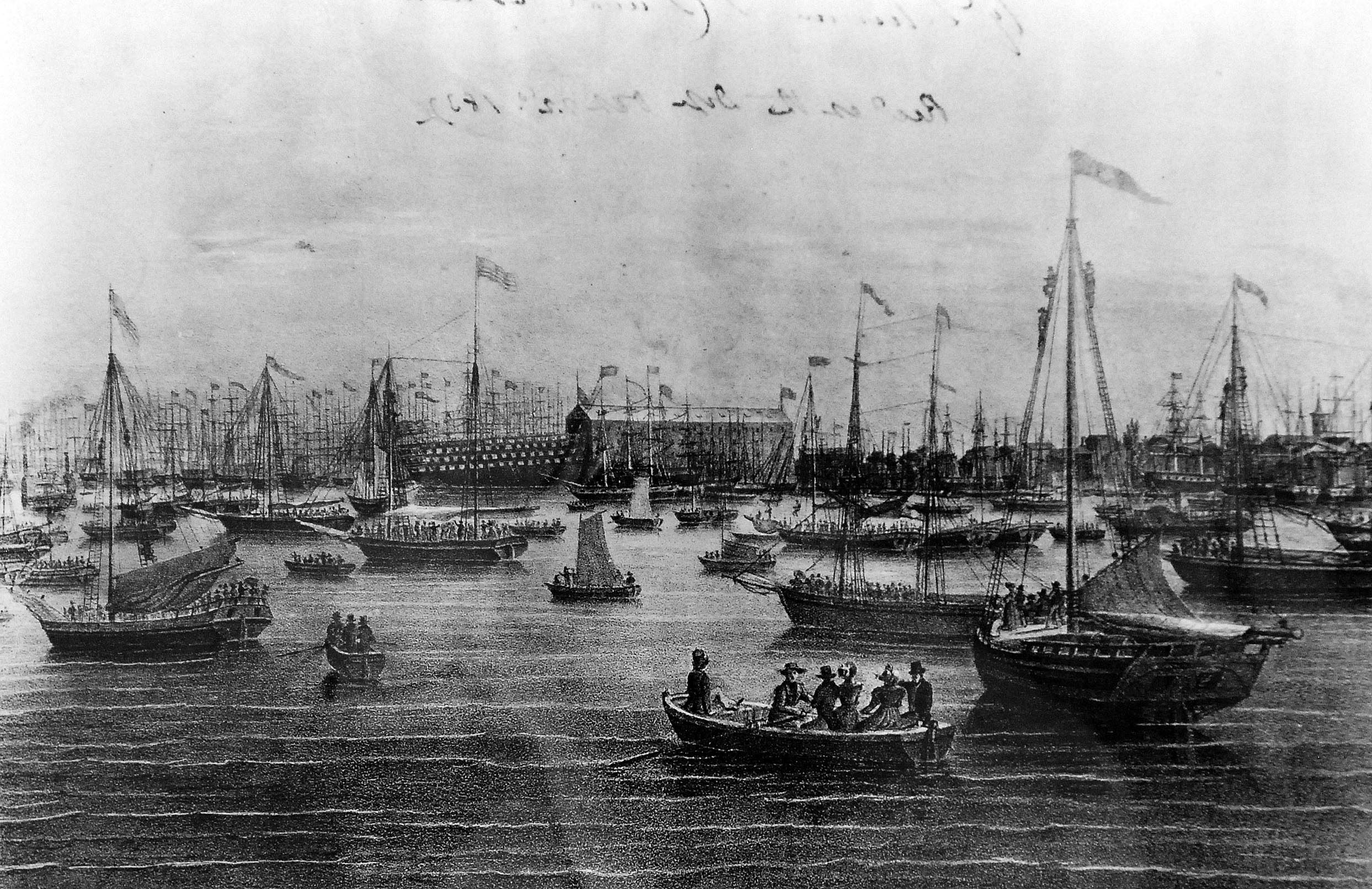
The launch of Pennsylvania at the Philadelphia Navy Yard

Pennsylvania was one of the "nine ships to rate not less than 74 guns each" authorized by the U.S. Congress on 29 April 1816. She was designed and built by Samuel Humphreys in the Philadelphia Navy Yard. Her keel was laid in September 1821, but tight budgets slowed her construction, preventing her being launched until 18 July 1837. The largest sailing warship ever built for the United States, she had three complete gun decks and a flush spar-deck and her hull was pierced for 136 guns.

Exploding shell guns were replacing solid shot by the time Pennsylvania was fitting out. A Bureau of Ordnance Gun Register for 1846 records her armament as follows:

- Spar deck: two 9-pounder (4 kg) cannons and one small brass swivel.
- Main deck: four 8 inch (203 mm) chambered cannons received from Norfolk in 1842, and thirty-two 32 pounder (15 kg) cannons.
- Middle deck: four 8 inch chambered cannons received from Norfolk in 1842, and thirty 32 pounder cannons.
- Lower deck: four 8 inch chambered cannons and 28 × 32 pounder cannons.

Pennsylvania shifted from her launching site to off Chester, Pennsylvania, on 29 November 1837 and was partially manned there the following day. Only 34 of her guns were noted as having been mounted on 3 December 1837. She stood downriver for New Castle, Delaware, 9 December, to receive gun carriages and other equippage before proceeding to the Norfolk Navy Yard (then called "Gosport") for the coppering of her hull. She departed New Castle on 20 December 1837 and discharged the Delaware pilot on the 25th. That afternoon she sailed for the Virginia Capes. She came off the Norfolk dry dock on 2 January 1838. That day her crew transferred to Columbia.

A few days before 18 September 1838, Pennsylvania was driven ashore at Norfolk. She remained in ordinary until 1842 when she became a receiving ship for the Norfolk Navy Yard. She remained in the yard until 20 April 1861 when she was burned to the waterline to prevent her falling into Confederate hands. Her wreck was salvaged and broken up.

== Bibliography ==
- Claude Berube. "Budget Battles, Interest Groups and Relevancy in a New Era: The Ship-of-the-Line USS Pennsylvania", (U.S. Naval Institute Proceedings, January 2008)
- Howard Chapelle, The History of the American Sailing Navy: The Ships and their Development (New York: Norton, 1949)
- Robert Gardiner, The Line of Battle: The Sailing Warship 1650–1850 (London: Conway Maritime Press, 1992)
