= Bellwood (Richmond, Virginia) =

Historic house in Virginia, United States

- U.S. National Register of Historic Places
- Virginia Landmarks Register
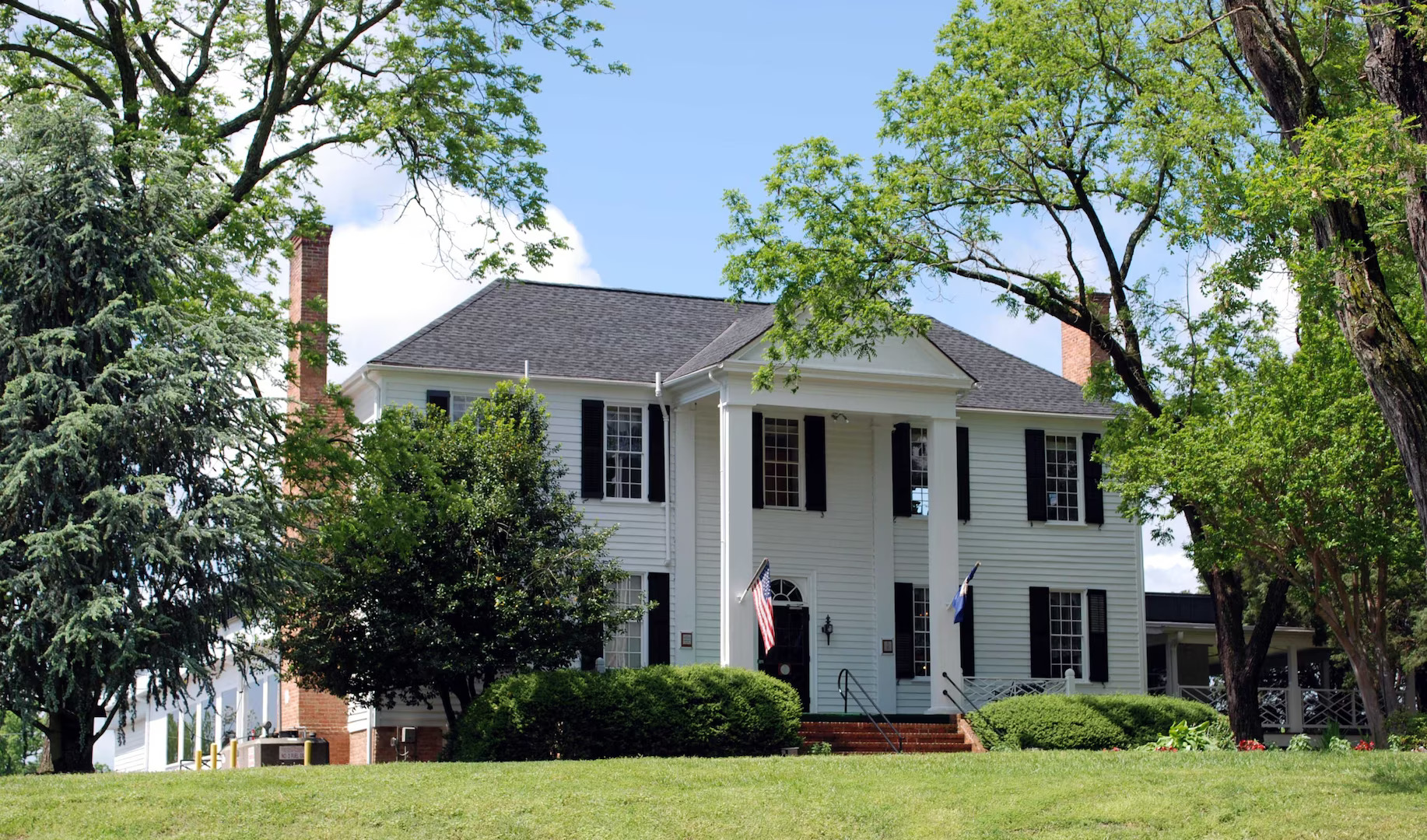
- Bellwood in 2019

- Location within Virginia Location within the United States
- Nearest city: Richmond, Virginia
- Coordinates: 37°24′55″N 77°26′10″W
- Area: 21 acres (8.5 ha)
- Built: c. 1804
- NRHP reference No.: 78003013
- VLR No.: 020-0007

Significant dates
- Added to NRHP: December 12, 1978
- Designated VLR: June 19, 1973, September 22, 2011

Bellwood, also known at various times over the past two centuries as Sheffields, New Oxford, Auburn Chase, and currently as Defense Supply Center Richmond Officers' Club-Building 42, is a historic plantation house located south of Richmond in Chesterfield County, Virginia.

Bellwood was built on a plantation that had been owned by the Ward family since the mid 17th century. In 1656 Judge Richard Ward, son of the original Seth Ward immigrant, married Elizabeth Blackman, daughter of Captain Jeremy Blackman a merchant, mariner and ship owner of London who patented land in the Colony of Virginia and later became President of the East India Company. In 1665 Ward acquired 1,337 acres on the south bank of the James River just downstream from the mouth of Falling Creek known as "Sheffields Plantation" that had been patented by his father-in-law, Blackman, in 1646.

First settled in 1619, the plantation got its name from Thomas Sheffield, the first proprietor, who was slain there along with his wife Rachel and 11 others during the Indian massacre of 1622. Their eldest son, Seth Ward (1661-1707), inherited the plantation in 1682 and over the next century four subsequent generations of first-born sons named Seth were born and raised at Sheffields and each in turn inherited the land. Seth Ward V sold the property to his aunt and uncle, Mary Ann Ward and Richard Claiborne Gregory in 1797.

The manor house now known as Bellwood was built on the plantation between 1790 and 1804. It is a two-story, five-bay, timberframe I-house dwelling with a low hipped roof in the Georgian style. The house is set on brick foundations and sheathed in weatherboard. Unlike many of the James River Plantations where the manor houses were built directly on the river, this house was built back from the river facing the Petersburg Turnpike, the road between Richmond and Petersburg, that preceded U.S. Route 1.

Richard Claiborne Gregory's son, Richard Augustus Gregory (1795-1835) inherited the property and in 1847, the plantation passed again through inheritance to Gregory's daughter Lavinia and her husband, Chesterfield Justice of the Peace Augustus Harrison Drewry. At the outbreak of the Civil War, Drewry was commissioned as commander of Company C, 2nd Regiment Virginia Artillery, CSA and helped construct a fort on the edge of the property known as Drewry's Bluff, or Fort Darling. The fort overlooked the James River and had 3 large guns (1 ten-inch and 2 eight-inch columbiads), the installation of which were overseen by General Robert E. Lee's eldest son Brigadier General G.W.C. Lee. The fort along with ships sunk in the river channel below Drewry's bluff to create obstructions were intended to prevent Union gunboats from reaching the Confederate Capitol, Richmond.

On May 15, 1862, in the Battle of Drewry's Bluff the guns of Fort Darling successfully held off an attempt by the Union warships Monitor and Galena to steam upriver to Richmond and later, repelled an attack by land. Drewry's regiment was broken up soon after the battle, but he was promoted to major shortly afterward for his actions during the battle that seriously damaged the Galena forcing the Union ironclads to retreat.

In May 1864, Confederate General P.G.T. Beauregard made the site his headquarters and met with General Braxton Bragg and Confederate President Jefferson Davis in the manor house to discuss plans for halting the Union Army's advance on Richmond. After the war, Drewry traded the farm, then known as "Auburn Chase", to Captain James P. Jones and moved to Westover in Charles City County where he lived until his death in 1899. Jones wasn't successful at farming, since the land had been worn out from over two centuries of mono-culture tobacco and cotton crops.

In 1887, the house and farmlands were acquired by James Bellwood, a Canadian farmer. Bellwood paid $18.50 per acre for approximately 2,000 acres of land and made the manor house his home and the property became known as "Bellwood Farms". To restore the productivity of the depleted soil, Bellwood introduced crop rotation, used mulching and natural fertilizers and installed miles of drainage tiles and levees transforming the worn out farm into one of Virginia's chief agricultural showplaces of the early 20th century. James Bellwood won many awards for his crops and livestock at the Panama–Pacific International Exposition in San Francisco in 1915. He grew many different varieties of grains, grasses and forage crops and also operated a large dairy farm which supplied milk to Richmond markets. He had a herd of over 1,000 Holstein cattle and a prize herd of beef cattle. Bellwood, a native of Ontario, missed the elk from his homeland and imported a breeding pair of elk and created an elk herd on the property.

James Bellwood died in 1924 and his descendants continued the agricultural operation through the 1930s. In 1941, 631 acres of the Bellwood property including the manor house, a large dairy barn and several outbuildings were acquired from his heirs by the U.S. Government to construct the Richmond Quartermaster Depot. The Army wanted the property due to its location along the Atlantic Coast Line Railroad, and US Route 1 (then the main north–south East Coast highway) and its close proximity to the newly constructed Port of Richmond. The Bellwoods agreed to sell the land to the government but one of the stipulations of the sale was that the Army agree to look after the elk herd and they have done so ever since. The dairy barn was demolished in 1947 but the antebellum manor house is maintained as the center's officers' club.

Although the house is now used as an officers’ club, much of the early fabric is still intact. This includes original heart pine flooring, paneled doors, stairs, and most of the door and window frames. A handsome Adam style mantel and paneled dado survive in one of the first-floor rooms. A long, one-story wing spanning the width of the house was added to the rear of the structure in modern times to accommodate a ballroom and the club's service areas. The property also contains the Gregory Family cemetery, the historic elk pasture created by James Bellwood, and two feeding stations for the elk. Bellwood is a listed Virginia and Chesterfield County landmark and was added the National Register of Historic Places in 1978. A boundary increase was accepted in 2013.

In 2020 and 2021 the Bellwood Manor house underwent a year-long $3.28 million renovation. The renovation work overseen by the U.S. Army Corps of Engineers was done in accordance with plans and drawings approved by the Virginia State Historic Preservation Office, and included some structural repairs, as well as interior and exterior restoration.
