= John F. Mackie =

US Marine Corps Medal of Honor recipient (1835–1910)

John Freeman Mackie
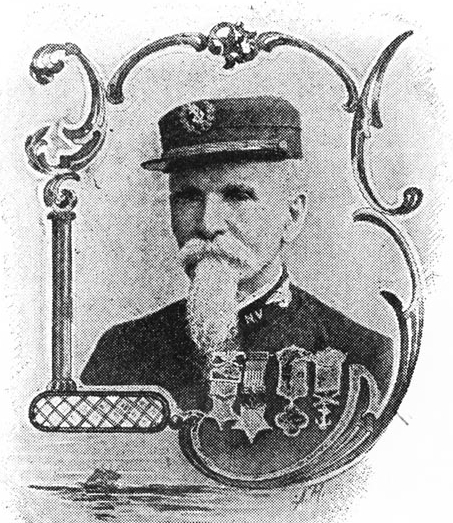
- John F. Mackie
- Born: October 1, 1835; New York City, U.S.
- Died: June 18, 1910 (aged 74)
- Burial place: Arlington Cemetery, Drexel Hill, Pennsylvania
- Military career
- Allegiance: United States of America
- Branch: United States Marine Corps
- Service years: 1861 – 1865
- Rank: Orderly sergeant
- Units: (United States Marine Corps) USS Galena (1862) (United States Marine Corps) USS Seminole (1859)
- Conflicts: American Civil War: Battle of Drewry's Bluff
- Awards: Medal of Honor

John Freeman Mackie (October 1, 1835 – June 18, 1910) was a United States Marine Corps sergeant during the American Civil War. He was awarded the nation's highest military decoration for valor—the Medal of Honor, for his actions aboard the USS Galena during the battle with Confederate Marines and artillery batteries at Fort Darling near Richmond, Virginia, on May 15, 1862. He is one of the first two Marines to be awarded the Medal of Honor, and is considered to be the first Marine to receive the Medal of Honor in the history of the Marine Corps.

== Biography ==
Mackie enlisted in the Marine Corps from New York on April 24, 1861. His first assignment was with the Marine Detachment on board the USS Savannah. He was promoted to corporal on March 1, 1862. On April 1, he began serving on the ironclad warship USS Galena. On May 15, a five-ship Union Navy squadron, including the Galena, steamed up the James River to test the defenses of the Confederate capital, Richmond, Virginia. After reaching a bend in the river upstream of Dutch Gap, the squadron encountered submerged obstacles and heavy fire from two battalions of Confederate Marines positioned on the banks of the river and artillery fire from Fort Darling atop Drewry's Bluff about eight miles below Richmond. Mackie commanded 12 Marines on the gun deck. The fort's artillery batteries inflicted severe damage on the Galena and forced the Union squadron to turn back. During the battle (which would come to be known as the Battle of Drewry's Bluff), most of Galena's naval gun crew was killed or wounded. Mackie led a group of Marines who took over operation of the guns for the remainder of the battle. On November 1, he was promoted to orderly sergeant. In June 1863, he was assigned to the USS Seminole.

On July 10, 1863, Mackie was awarded the Medal of Honor (Navy version) for his actions aboard the Galena on May 15, 1862. Mackie was particularly mentioned for his "gallant conduct and services and signal acts of devotion to duty". On October 11, 1863, he received the medal by U.S. Postal Service mail while aboard the Seminole which was anchored off Sabine Pass, Texas. Mackie was presented the Medal of Honor during a ceremony on the quarterdeck of the ship. He was honorably discharged from the Marine Corps on August 23, 1865, in Boston. Mackie and Sergeant Pinkerton Vaughn (USS Mississippi, 1863) were the first Marines to be awarded the Medal of Honor.

Mackie eventually married and settled near Philadelphia. He died at the age of 74 and is buried in Arlington Cemetery, in the Drexel Hill section of Upper Darby, Pennsylvania. At Drewry's Bluff, now within Richmond National Battlefield Park, a marker is posted which features Mackie's Medal of Honor action.

== Medal of Honor citation ==
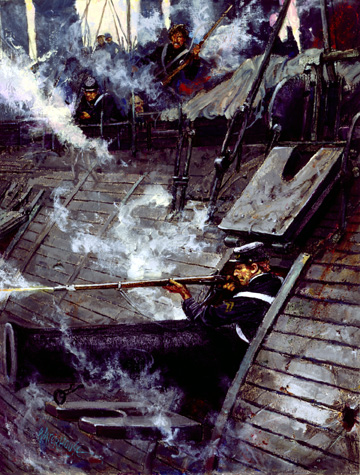
Cpl Mackie aboard the USS Galena at Drewry's Bluff

Mackie's Medal of Honor Citation reads:

Rank and Organization: Corporal, U.S. Marine Corps
Born: 1836, New York, N.Y.
Accredited to: New York
G.O. No.: 17, 10 July 1863

Citation:

On board the U.S.S. Galena, in the attack on Fort Darling, at Drewry's Bluff, James River, on May 15, 1862. As enemy shellfire raked the deck of his ship, Corporal Mackie fearlessly maintained his musket fire against the rifle pits along the shore and, when ordered to fill vacancies at guns caused by men wounded and killed in action, manned the weapon with skill and courage.

== See also ==
- List of American Civil War Medal of Honor recipients: M–P
- List of Historically Important U.S. Marines
