= Battle of Drewry's Bluff =

Battle of the American Civil War

Coordinates: 37.4211°N 77.4229°W

- Part of the American Civil War
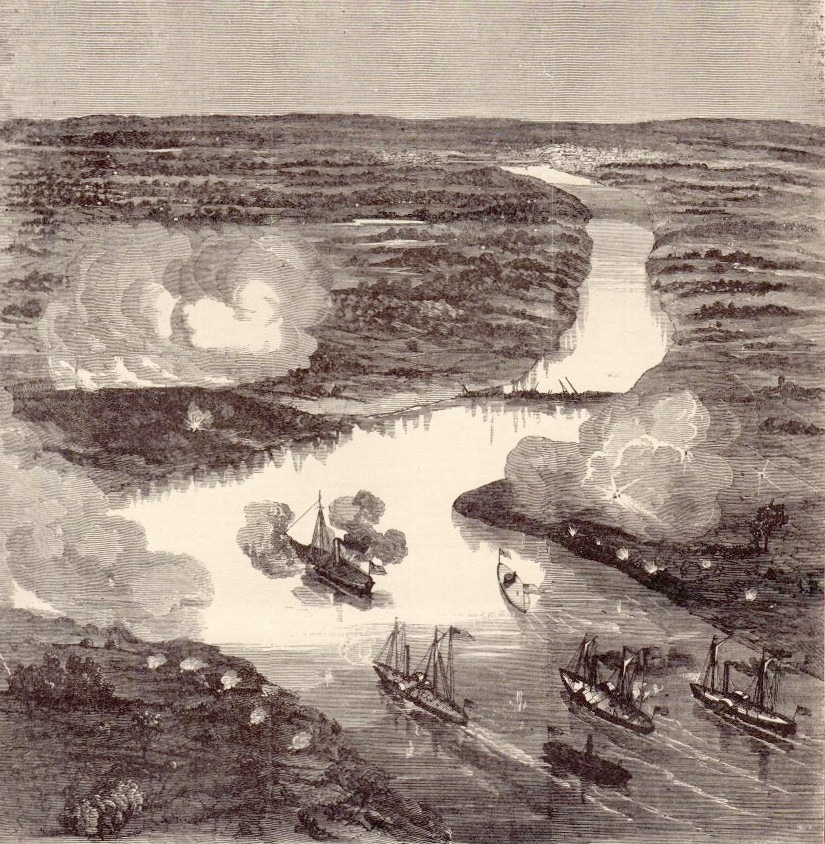
Date	May 15, 1862
Location	Chesterfield County, Virginia
Result	Confederate victory

Belligerents
United States (Union)	CSA (Confederacy)

Commanders and leaders
John Rodgers	Ebenezer Farrand; William Mahone; John Taylor Wood

Strength
3 ironclads; 2 gunboats	~8 artillery pieces; 1 fort; 1 shore battery

Casualties and losses
2 ironclads damaged; 2 gunboats damaged; 27 killed or wounded	1 fort damaged; 15 killed or wounded

The Battle of Drewry's Bluff, also known as the Battle of Fort Darling, or Fort Drewry, took place on May 15, 1862, in Chesterfield County, Virginia, as part of the Peninsula Campaign of the American Civil War. Four Union Navy warships, including the ironclads USS Monitor and Galena, and the United States Revenue Cutter Service's ironclad USRC Naugatuck steamed up the James River to test the defenses of Richmond, Virginia, the Confederate capital. They encountered submerged obstacles, and the batteries of Fort Darling at Drewry's Bluff inflicted severe damage on Galena, forcing the ships to turn back.

== Background ==
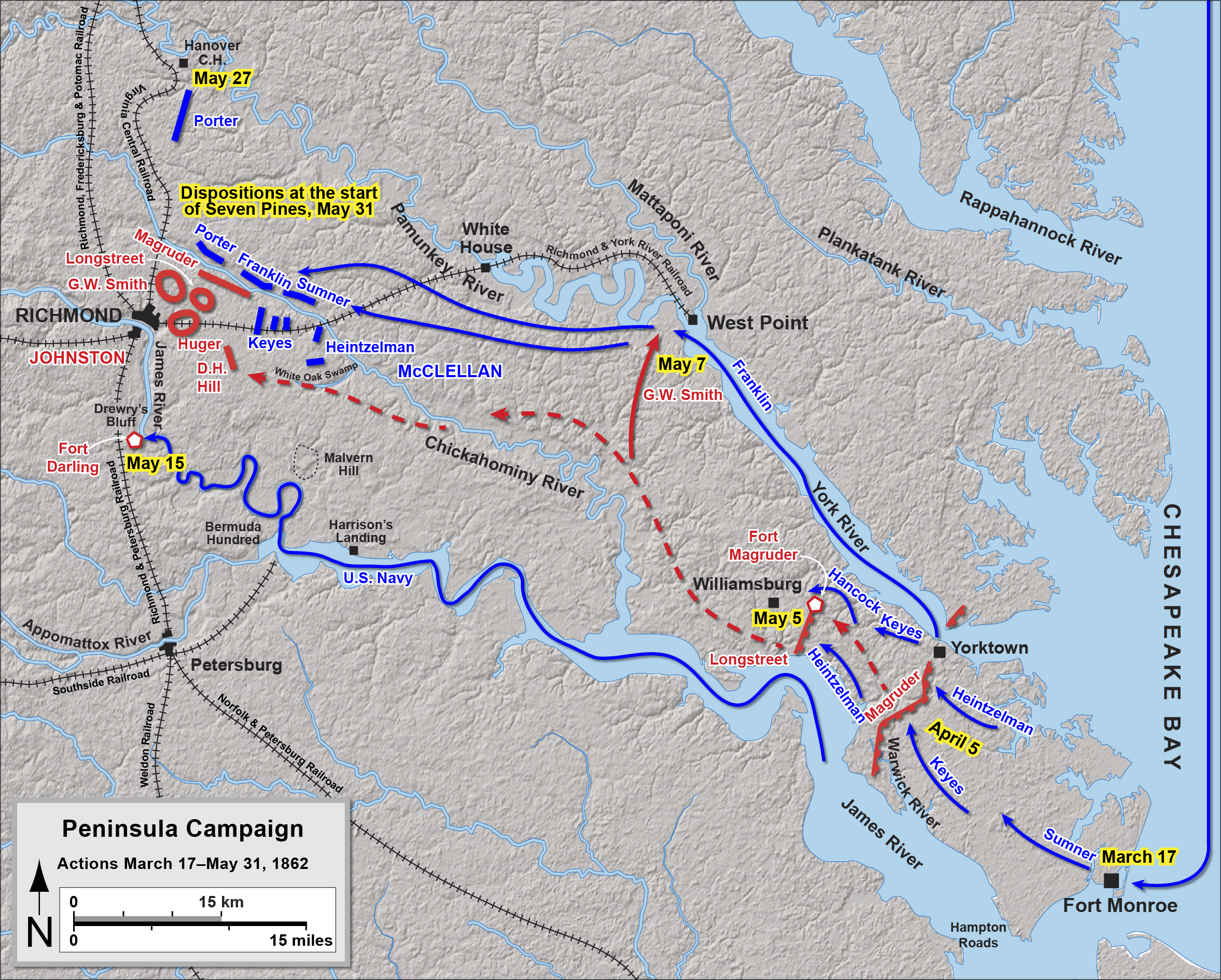
Peninsula Campaign, map of events up to the Battle of Seven Pines Confederate Union

In the spring of 1862, Union Major General George B. McClellan launched an amphibious operation against Richmond by landing troops at Fort Monroe and then marching northwest up the Virginia Peninsula. After the fall of Yorktown and the withdrawal of General Joseph E. Johnston's army up the Peninsula, only the Confederate Navy ironclad CSS Virginia prevented Union occupation of the lower James River and Norfolk. When the Confederate garrison at Norfolk was evacuated by Maj. Gen. Benjamin Huger on May 10, Commodore Josiah Tattnall III knew that he could not navigate Virginia through the shallow stretches of the James River toward Richmond, so she was scuttled on May 11 off Craney Island to prevent her capture. This opened the James River at Hampton Roads to Federal gunboats.

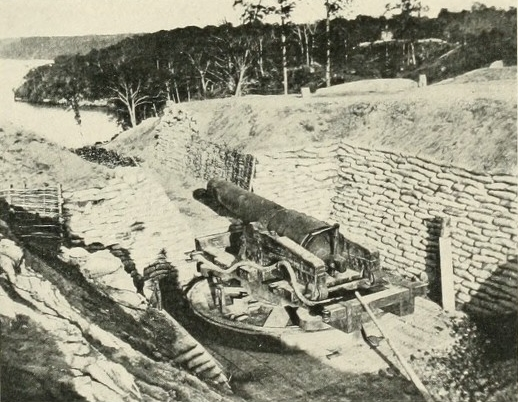
Confederate gun at Battery Dantzler, Drewry's Bluff.

The only obstacle protecting Richmond from a river approach was Fort Darling on Drewry's Bluff, overlooking a sharp bend 7 mi (11 km) down river from the city. The Confederate defenders, including marines, sailors, and soldiers, were supervised by navy Commander Ebenezer Farrand and by army Captain Augustus H. Drewry (the owner of the property that bore his name) of the Southside Heavy Artillery. The eight cannons in the fort, including field artillery pieces and five naval guns, some salvaged from Virginia, commanded the river for miles in both directions. Guns from CSS Patrick Henry, including an 8 in (203 mm) smoothbore, were just upriver and sharpshooters gathered on the river banks. An underwater obstruction of sunken steamers, pilings, debris, and other vessels connected by chains was placed just below the bluff, making it difficult for vessels to maneuver in the narrow river.

== Battle ==
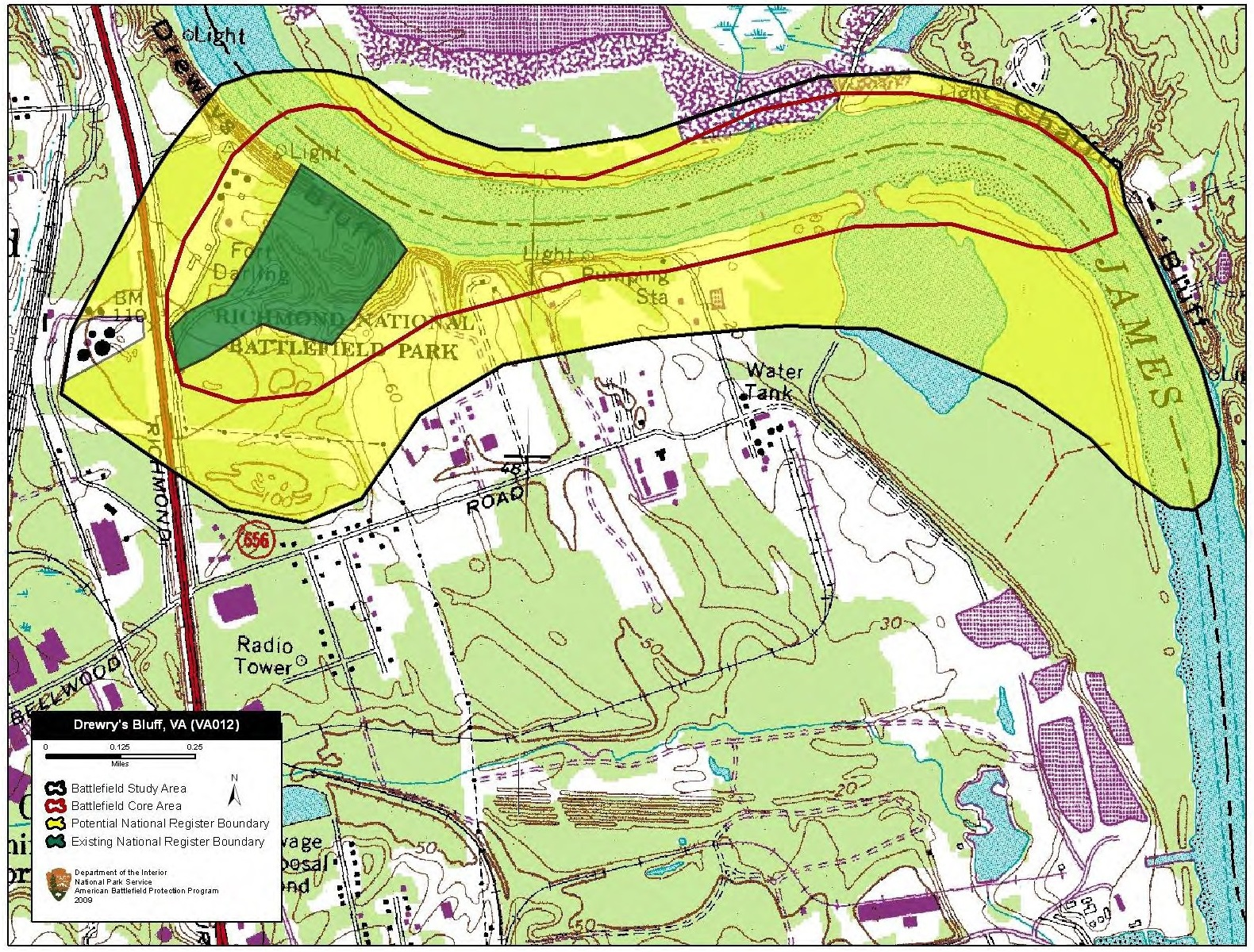
Map of Drewry's_Bluff Battlefield core and study areas by the American Battlefield Protection Program.

On May 15, a detachment of the U.S. Navy's North Atlantic Blockading Squadron, under the command of Commander John Rodgers steamed up the James River from Fort Monroe to test the Richmond defenses. The flotilla consisted of the ironclad gunboats USS Monitor (commanded by Lieutenant William N. Jeffers) and Galena (the flagship), the screw gunship Aroostook, the side-wheeler Port Royal, and the twin-screw semi-submersible ironclad USRC Naugatuck.

At 07:45, Galena closed to within 600 yd (550 m) of the fort and anchored, but before Rodgers could open fire, two Confederate rounds pierced the lightly armored vessel. The battle lasted over three hours and during that time, Galena remained almost stationary and took 45 hits. Her crew reported casualties of 14 dead or mortally wounded and 10 injured. Monitor was a frequent target, but her heavier armor withstood the blows. Contrary to some reports, Monitor, despite her squat turret, did not have difficulty bringing her guns to bear and fired steadily against the fort. Naugatuck sustained little damage compared to the Monitor and Galena due to her semi-submersible design, but had to withdraw when her 100-pounder Parrott rifle exploded. The two wooden gunboats remained largely out of range of the big guns, but the captain of Port Royal was wounded by a sharpshooter. Around 11:00, the Union ships withdrew to City Point.

== Aftermath ==
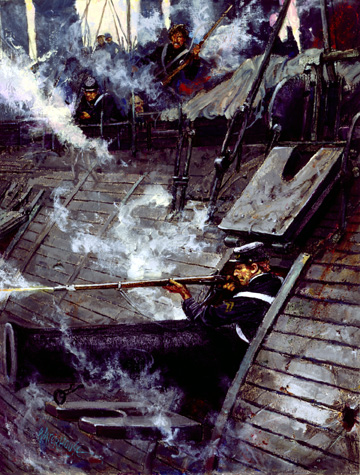
U.S. Marine Corps illustration of Corporal John F. Mackie firing his rifle aboard the USS Galena.

During the battle, Corporal John F. Mackie became the first Marine to earn the Medal of Honor.

The massive fort on Drewry's Bluff had blunted the Union advance just 7 mi (11 km) short of the Confederate capital, at a loss of seven Confederates killed and eight wounded. Richmond remained safe. Rodgers reported to McClellan that it was feasible for the navy to land troops as close as 10 mi (16 km) from Richmond. Some amateur researchers think the Union Army never took advantage of this observation.

The area saw action again during the Siege of Petersburg. The Army of the James landed on May 5, 1864, at Bermuda Hundred, a neck of land north of City Point at the confluence of the James and Appomattox Rivers, only 15 miles (24 km) south of Richmond. The army marched overland, advancing within three miles (4.8 km) of Drewry's Bluff by May 9. From a tactical perspective, Bermuda Hundred allowed a complete amphibious landing with less likelihood of counterattack than a landing five miles closer to Drewry's Bluff and Fort Darling.

== Gallery ==
Drewry's Bluff

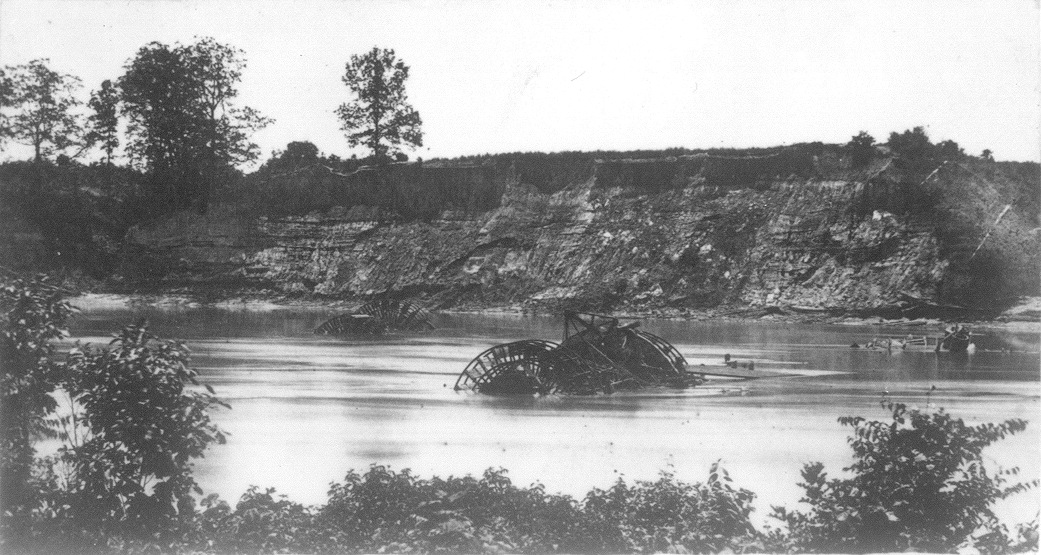
Drewry's Bluff, 1865.

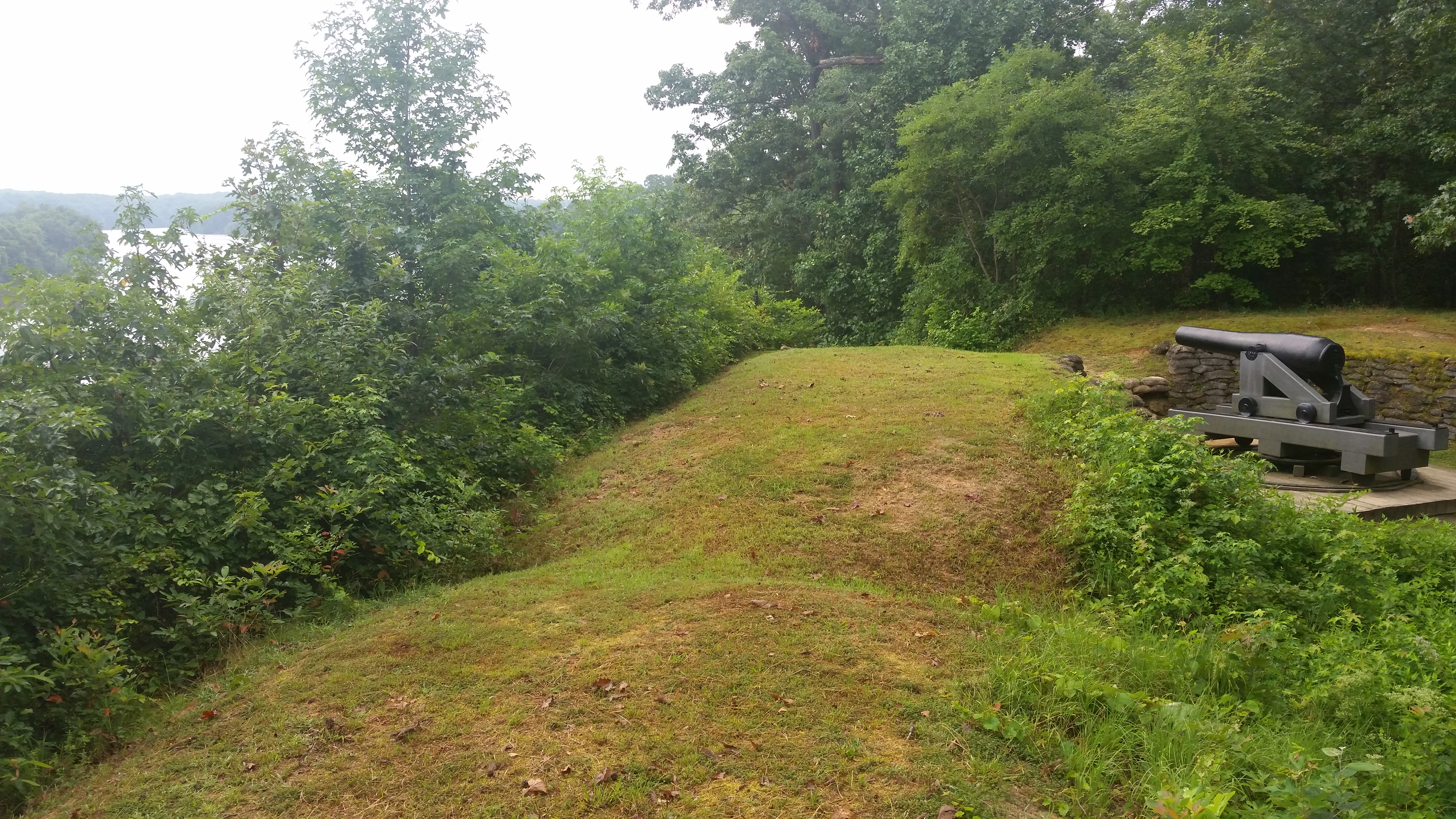
Drewry's Bluff, August 2016.
