= CSS Patrick Henry =

1859 gunboat of the Confederate States Navy

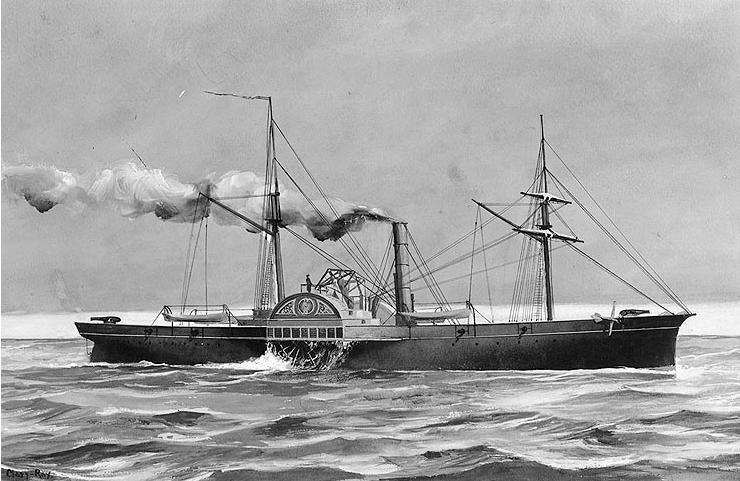

History

Confederate States
- Name: Patrick Henry
- Namesake: Patrick Henry
- Launched: 1859
- Christened: (as Yorktown)
- Commissioned: 17 April 1861
- Fate: Burned to prevent capture 3 April 1865

General characteristics
- Displacement: 1300 tons
- Length: 250 ft (76 m)
- Beam: 34 ft (10 m)
- Draft: 13 ft (4.0 m)
- Propulsion: steam
- Complement: 150 officers and men
- Armament: 1 × 10-inch (254 mm) smoothbore, 1 × 64-pounder (29 kg), 6 × 8-inch (203 mm) guns, 2 × 32-pounder (15 kg) rifles

CSS Patrick Henry was a ship built in New York City in 1859 by the renowned William H. Webb for the Old Dominion Steam Ship Line as the civilian steamer Yorktown, a brigantine-rigged side-wheel steamer. She carried passengers and freight between Richmond, Virginia, and New York City. Yorktown was anchored in the James River when Virginia seceded from the Union on 17 April 1861 and was seized by the Virginia Navy and later turned over to the Confederate Navy on 8 June 1861.

Commander John Randolph Tucker, who commanded the ship, directed that Yorktown be converted into a gunboat and renamed Patrick Henry in honor of Patrick Henry, the revolutionary patriot and Founding Father. She also served as the first flagship of the James River Squadron.

== Career ==
Still commonly referred to as Yorktown, she was assigned to a position near Mulberry Island in the James River to protect the right flank of the Confederate Army of the Peninsula.

On 13 September 1861 and again on 2 December, Commander Tucker took Patrick Henry down the river to a point about 1.5 miles (2.4 kilometers) above Newport News, Virginia, and opened fire on the Federal squadron at long range hoping to draw out some of the gunboats. The gambit was refused, but Tucker inflicted some minor damage.

During the Battle of Hampton Roads on 8 March 1862 in which CSS Virginia destroyed the Federal warships USS Cumberland and USS Congress, Patrick Henry attempted to take the latter's surrender but was fired upon by shore batteries, and took a shell in her steam chest that killed four men. Towed out of action long enough to make repairs, she soon resumed her former position.

During the historic 9 March 1862 action between Virginia and USS Monitor, Patrick Henry fired long range at Monitor. The Confederate Congress later accorded special thanks to all officers and men for their gallant conduct during the two-day battle.

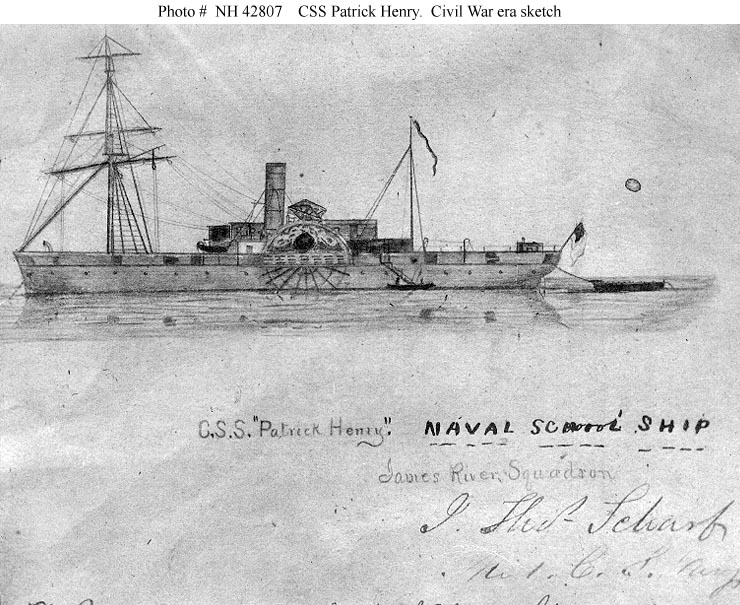
A sketch of the CSS Patrick Henry signed by Midshipman J.Thomas Scharf.

Patrick Henry was also present during some of Virginia's other actions. In a daring night operation on 5 May 1862, she helped remove Confederate property from the Norfolk Navy Yard before it was abandoned to the Federals.

After the surrender of Norfolk, Virginia, on 10 May 1862, the James River Squadron, including Patrick Henry, retired up the river to Drewry's Bluff, where pursuing Federal ships were repulsed on 15 May.

Patrick Henry was designated an academy ship in May 1862 and underwent appropriate alterations. In October 1863, Patrick Henry housed the floating Confederate States Naval Academy at Drewry's Bluff, where instruction for 52 midshipmen began under the superintendency of Lieutenant William Harwar Parker. Numbers later increased to sixty, with thirteen teachers in attendance. Sometimes she took part in action with the midshipmen on board.

When Richmond was evacuated on 3 April 1865, Patrick Henry was burned to prevent capture. Her midshipmen were charged with the delivery of a treasury of some CS$500,000 to the new government seat of Danville, Virginia. When they were disbanded each were given $40 in gold to help them reach their homes.

== Commanders ==
The commanders of the CSS Patrick Henry were:

- Captain John Randolph Tucker (1861 – June 1862)
- Lieutenant William Harwar Parker (1863-end of war)

== See also ==
- Bibliography of American Civil War naval history
- List of ships of the Confederate States Navy
- Union Navy
- USS Patrick Henry
