= Confederate States Naval Academy =

- Motto: Deo Vindice
- Motto in English: With God Our Vindicator
- Type: Military academy
- Established: April 21, 1862
- Superintendent: LT William H. Parker, CSN
- Administrative staff: 13
- Undergraduates: 52
- Location: Richmond, Virginia, CSA
- Campus: CSS Patrick Henry
- Colors: Steel Gray █ and Gold █
- Website: Naval Historical Center: CSS Patrick Henry

The Confederate States Naval Academy was an undergraduate academy in Richmond, Virginia, of the Confederate States of America that educated and commissioned officers of the Confederate States Navy. The CS Naval Academy was established by an act of the Confederate States Congress on April 21, 1862, and graduated a number of midshipmen before being disbanded on May 2, 1865, in Abbeville, South Carolina, subsequent to the fall of the Confederate States.

== Mission ==
Shortly after the establishment of the Confederate States of America in 1861, the separatist state became involved in a large war with the United States of America, and the Confederate Secretary of the Navy Stephen Mallory had the responsibility to quickly build the Confederate States Navy, starting with almost no ships or resources. Among his primary goals was the establishment of an academy. Confederate States officials saw no need for a Naval Academy early in the war, due to the number of southern military schools, and so midshipmen in the early Confederate Navy were trained by the traditional system of assigning them directly to ships and batteries.

President Jefferson Davis, a graduate of the United States Military Academy, quickly recognized the need for a long term plan to form both army and navy academies for the nation, and gave his vision that "to secure a thorough military education ... it is essential that officers should enter upon the study of their profession at an early period of life and have elementary instruction in a military school."

== Facilities ==
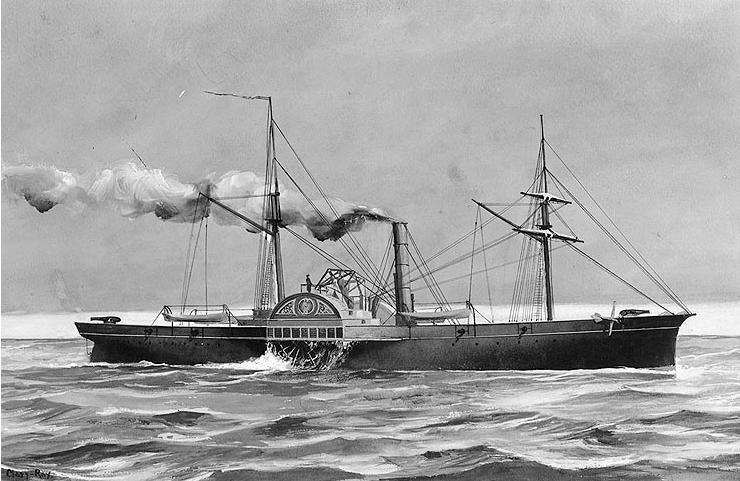
CSS Patrick Henry, CS Naval Academy school ship

The naval college was housed on board the CSS Patrick Henry, a seagoing sidewheel steamer with a walking-beam engine and brigantine rigged, armed with ten guns, and a veteran of the Battle of Hampton Roads. Anchored seven miles south of Richmond, Virginia at Drewry's Bluff, near the Confederate States Marine Corps Camp Beall, "she had now become the most realistic war college that ever existed." Located there, Patrick Henry served the additional purpose of potentially being sunk as an obstruction in the James River channel. The CSS Patrick Henry could only accommodate 52 midshipmen, 20 officers, professors and crew, which limited and helped dictate the size of the naval college.

The ship also functioned as a receiving ship for receiving other steamers under flags of truce, taking captured United States POWs to Harrison's Landing for exchange. Steamers under flags of truce would stop at the Patrick Henry to get their permit to continue downriver, and then return and discharge liberated former Confederate States prisoners.

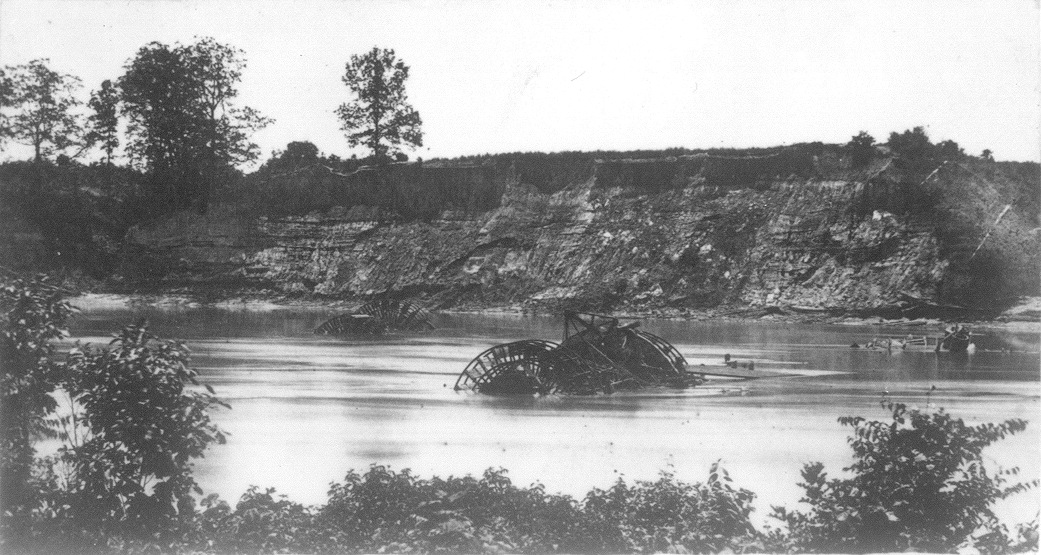
Drewry's Bluff, south of Richmond, Virginia on the James River

The Patrick Henry was specially modified to serve as the school ship in May 1862 when she was sent to the Rockets Navy Yard in Richmond. All but four of her guns had been mounted at the naval battery at Drewry's Bluff on the James River. The four remaining guns were used for gunnery drills and training of the midshipmen, and served to assist, when necessary, in the defense of that river location. Two class rooms made of pine boards were mounted amidships on the gun deck between the paddlewheel boxes, and an oversized fully rigged mast was placed forward for sail handling and training. Finally a small launch armed with a twelve-pound howitzer was kept on davits for training.

Toward the end of the war the demand for midshipmen to assist with shoreside combat duty greatly increased, requiring the students to be housed in huts built inside the Drewry's Bluff batteries.

== Supervision of the Academy ==
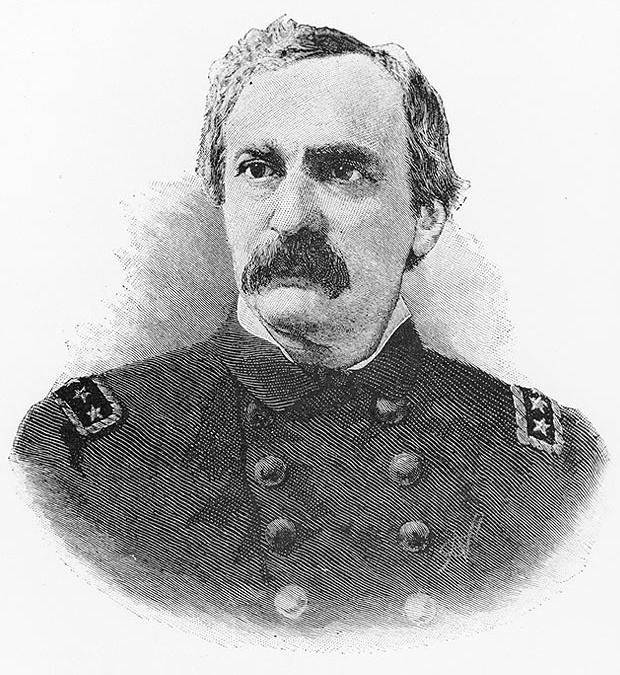
Lieutenant William H. Parker, CSN: Superintendent of the CS Naval Academy

The superintendent, LT Parker, had been an instructor of seamanship at the U.S. Naval Academy, and was assisted by six CS Navy lieutenants and three CS Navy masters along with several civilian professors. The faculty worked on the hurricane deck between the paddlewheel boxes in two small recitation rooms. While serving as the superintendent Parker wrote the textbook Elements of Seamanship for the school.

=== Faculty and staff ===
The following academic faculty served at CSNA:

==== Military Faculty ====
- Lieutenant Wiburn B. Hall, CSN - Commandant of Midshipman and Executive Officer of the CSS Patrick Henry
- Lieutenant Oscar F. Johnston, CSN - Commandant of Midshipman and Professor of Astronomy, Navigation and Surveying
- Lieutenant Benjamin P. Loyall, CSN - Commandant of Midshipman and Professor of Astronomy, Navigation and Surveying
- Lieutenant James H. Rochelle, CSN - Commandant of Midshipman and Executive Officer of the CSS Patrick Henry
- Lieutenant Thomas W. W. Davies, CSN - Assistant Professor of Astronomy, Navigation and Surveying
- Lieutenant Charles Iverson Graves, CSN - Instructor of Seamanship
- Lieutenant James W. Billups, CSN - Assistant Instructor of Seamanship
- Lieutenant William Van Comstock, CSN - Instructor of Gunnery
- Lieutenant John P. McGuire, CSN - Assistant Professor of Mathematics
- Master George M. Peek, CSN - Professor of Mathematics
- Master George W. Armistead, CSN - Professor of Physics
- Master George A. Pepley, CSN - Professor of French and German

==== Civilian Faculty ====
- Gustave Adolphus "Gus" Peple - Professor of French and Spanish
- William B. Cox - Instructor of Drawing and Painting
- Mr. Sanxey - Instructor of Infantry Tactics
- Louis N. Huck - Professor of English Literature
- Unknown - Sword Master

==== School ship crew ====
- Assistant Surgeon W. J. Addison
- Assistant Surgeon James G. Bixley
- Paymaster William H. Ladd
- Assistant Paymaster John F. Wheless
- First Assistant Engineer - Elias G. Hall
- Boatswain - Andrew Blakie
- Gunner - E. R. Johnson
- Gunner - William F. Brittingham
- Sailmaker - William Bennett

The original staff appointed to the school remained fairly intact, with the change that in the summer of 1864 a new Commandant of Midshipman was appointed: Lieutenant O. F. Johnston, and then he was followed by Commander James Henry Rochelle who was appointed both Commandant of Midshipman and Executive Officer.

== Student Activities ==
=== Uniforms ===
The midshipman uniforms followed the CS Navy uniform regulations issued after 1862, requiring the uniform to be steel grey in color, lined with dark black silk serge. The jackets were coarse gray cloth material, and made of wool. The sleeves of midshipmen, like all officers, had three sleeve buttons mounted vertically. In lieu of stripe, midshipman had three small buttons with fouled anchors, and passed midshipmen had three large buttons with fouled anchors mounted horizontally. A midshipman had no shoulder strap, while a passed midshipman had a strip of gold lace four inches long and half an inch wide. The covers of both ranks of midshipman were also steel gray and contained only a horizontal gold officers band with a fouled anchor, and a black leather visor.

Confederate States Navy Midshipman Rank Insignia
Insignia location	Passed Midshipman	Midshipman
Sleeves		
Shoulder; Straps		(none)
Cover		

=== Meals ===
The menu had little variety. Breakfast was hard-tack and a decoction of coffee made from either sweet potatoes or beans. Typically a meal was a lump of fat pork (salt-junk) or fresh meat shaving, a piece of hardtack, and a tin cup of coffee made from either chicory or burned corn. Occasionally vegetables were served, and corn-meal.

=== Daily routine ===
The daily life of a midshipman was centered around three activities: academic recitations and drills, work and maintenance of the school ship, and occasional help and support to actual combat operations with onshore batteries. The daily schedule was composed of:

- 0700 - the morning gun
- 0800 - breakfast
- 0900–1200 - studies, recitations or sick call
- 1200 - dinner
- afternoon - school exercises or dress parade
- 2130 - tattoo
- 2200 - taps

=== Extra-curricular activities ===
On top of the recitation classrooms signalmen were posted who would relay wig-wag messages to the local batteries onshore. Occasionally, when the guns opened up for combat engagement they would be short of officers and a message was sent down to the school to request some midshipmen to help out. Every midshipman was eager to volunteer, and so these details to the shore batteries were given as a reward from the classroom instructors.

== Appointment process ==
Midshipmen were generally appointed by their representatives to the CS Congress from their districts, while some appointments at large were made directly by the President of the Confederate States. Candidates were required to be between the ages of fourteen and eighteen, to pass a physical examination, and an academic examination on reading, writing, spelling and arithmetic, and to be of "good moral character".

== Curricula ==
Academic subjects included seamanship, gunnery, mathematics, steam engineering, navigation, English studies, French, drawing and drafting. The basic organization, studies and regulations of the school were modeled after the curriculum and format of the U. S. Naval Academy.

=== Studies ===
Studies were divided into six departments and twenty-two branches, distributed in four annual courses of learning, with one course of learning assigned to each year of the four years of planned study, as follows:

- Fourth Class year – practical seamanship, naval gunnery, artillery, infantry tactics, arithmetic, algebra (to first degree equations), English grammar, descriptive geography
- Third Class year – practical seamanship, gunnery, artillery, infantry tactics, algebra, geometry, plane and spherical trigonometry, physical geography, history, French
- Second Class year – seamanship, steam, gunnery, field artillery, astronomy, navigation, application of algebra and trigonometry to mensuration of planes and solids, political science, French
- First Class year – seamanship, naval tactics, gunnery, infantry tactics, navigation, surveying, French, Spanish

=== Academic board ===
Secretary Mallory provided an order for examination by a board of officers. Captain Sidney S. Lee, CSN and Captain Samuel Barron, CSN led an appointed board of examiners. The academic board held examinations of midshipmen twice a year in June and December, and as soon as a midshipman passed his examinations and was ready for sea duty, he was promoted to the rank of "passed" midshipman, and given orders to either a ship, battery or other duties. The Academic board was composed of three captains and two commanders.

== History ==
=== 1861 ===
The provisional government of the newly formed Confederate States of America established the Confederate States Navy and formed a structure for it on March 16 which "amply authorized" the creation of a Confederate States Naval Academy. By December of that year, the Confederate States Congress instructed Secretary Mallory to establish "some form of education for midshipmen."

=== 1862 ===
Secretary Mallory, overwhelmed with the duties of standing up the CS Navy in the midst of a war, finally responded to the dictate from Congress in a letter to President Davis on February 27, 1862, in which he recommended the creation and establishment of a naval academy as the best form and means of educating midshipmen. On April 21, 1862, by an act of Congress, the naval academy was approved with a total manpower level for midshipmen at 106 and that of passed midshipmen 20. In that same month, the CS Naval Academy started taking appointments for the school.

On May 5, 1862 five Union gunboats, including the USS Monitor and the USS Galena, sailed up the James to test the Richmond defenses at Fort Darling on Drewry's Bluff which commanded a strategically powerful location on the cliffs overlooking the James River. Engaging in battle with Fort Darling's guns the ships received heavy damage and were forced to withdraw on May 15. The crew of the CSS Patrick Henry, flagship of the James River Squadron were commended for their service during this battle, and the same day the flagship was selected to be withdrawn from combat service for conversion to house the new naval academy "without interfering with her efficiency as a vessel of war.". The CSS Patrick Henry, a 1,300 ton sidewheel steamer, partially and lightly ironclad amidships, was pulled into Rockets Navy Yard in Richmond for refitting as a school ship, and then stationed near Drewry's Bluff where cabins were constructed ashore for the midshipmen, when they were needed to man the naval batteries there. Drewry's Bluff also became an important training ground for the Confederate States Marine Corps Camp of Instruction.

The organization and stand up of the school was performed by LT Parker and Commander John Mercer Brooke, CSN. CDR Brooke was serving as the head of the Office of Ordnance and Hydrography for the CS Navy department in Richmond and both Parker and Brooke were graduates from among the first classes of the United States Naval Academy. They were well qualified for the organization of the school and Parker had, in fact, been an instructor at the US Naval Academy for six years. LT Parker was appointed as the superintendent of the school and its midshipman, and was instructed to create the regulations for its government and submitted his regulations to CDR Brooke.

=== 1863 ===
CDR Brooke had responsibility for supervision of the school, and on July 23, 1863 the final organizational proposals and regulations that he and LT Parker had put together were approved by Secretary Mallory and the Naval Academy officially went into operation. Throughout the spring of 1863 materials, supplies and textbooks had been purchased and obtained for the school, including arithmetic, algebra, grammar, English and astronomy texts, and various special equipments such as azimuth compasses. The first of the midshipmen arrived onboard Patrick Henry and on July 23, 1863 the Confederate Naval Academy started its first class of midshipman. Only 52 of the 106 authorized level of midshipmen reported to the Naval Academy, partly due to the limitations of boarding space on the school ship. The midshipmen were "active" Navy and received $500.00 annually plus room, board and uniforms.

In October 1863, William Harwar Parker became superintendent. His brother, Commodore Foxhall A. Parker, became Superintendent of USNA on July 1, 1878.

During October, instruction and classes began for 52 midshipmen at the Confederate States Naval Academy on board CSS Patrick Henry in the James River. Numbers later increased to sixty, with thirteen teachers in attendance.

Hubbard T. Minor (was from the 42nd Tennessee Regiment). Hubbard's diary was a requirement to be kept at school.

=== 1864 ===
In May 1864 Major General Benjamin F. Butler landed southeast of the school near Bermuda Hundred, Virginia during the Bermuda Hundred Campaign. Only 3,000 Confederate forces were between the Appomattox River and Richmond, forcing Commander J. K. Mitchell to employ the James River Squadron in fortifications south of the capital. LT William Parker took one detachment of midshipman on board the CSS Fredericksburg, and LT Hall and LT Johnson took another detachment of midshipman on board the CSS Virginia II. The ships were used to defend the left flank of General P. G. T. Beauregard's army at the Howlett House battery. The midshipman were landed under the command of LT Hall and participated in several skirmishes with forces from the Union's Army of the James, as the Confederate forces successfully "bottled" that army.

June 1864 raid on the USS Water Witch, evacuation of CSS Savannah, Confederate retreat to Richmond.

By September 1864 a lull in fighting allowed LT Parker to be relieved of command of the CSS Fredericksburg and return to the school on board the CSS Patrick Henry. The school ship was moved upriver to the water front in Richmond.

December 1864 – 29 former U.S. Midshipmen and 30 others were passed.

=== 1865 ===
In the spring of 1865, as the fall of Richmond became inevitable, Secretary Mallory made a decision to relocate the school further into the interior of the Condederate States, in some location possibly in North or South Carolina or Georgia. Lieutenant Graves was sent to examine locations and buildings which could be used for the move. But no good location was found for the move, and the superintendent, LT Parker, rented a warehouse at the corner of Franklin and 24th Street in Richmond in March. Preparations were made for the midshipman to sink their beloved school ship as an obstruction in the James River.

On the afternoon of April 2, 1865 as Richmond was being evacuated, LT Parker received the order to have the midshipman and faculty assembled at the Danville Depot by 6pm and to report to the Quartermaster General of the CS Army. LT Parker and his midshipmen were ordered to escort President Jefferson Davis, his party, and the Confederate archives and treasury south. The Lieutenant took 50 of his students for that mission leaving the remaining 10 students under the command of LT Billups with the task of destroying the ship that had been their school, and the CSS Patrick Henry was set on fire and destroyed. LT Billups and the rear party never caught up with LT Parker and his main body of 50 midshipman. LT Parker and the main body guarded the train containing the public treasure of $500,000 which was destined for the new government seat of Danville. The following day, April 3, they escorted the archives of the government and the bullion of the treasury from Richmond to Danville and southward. Midshipman Raphael Semmes, Jr. was detailed to the staff of his father, Admiral Raphael Semmes and Midshipman Breckinridge was detailed as an aide to his father the Confederate States Secretary of War, John C. Breckinridge

From April 3 through April 9, LT Parker and the midshipman remained in Danville, Virginia and then moved south to Greensboro, North Carolina on April 10, and to Charlotte, North Carolina by April 13. Here the treasury was temporarily held in the Charlotte mint, but taken out as the contingent moved to Chester, South Carolina. The use of the train was abandoned, and the treasury was put in a wagon train, with the gold packed in small boxes and the silver in kegs. Together, with the first lady, Mrs. Jefferson Davis, they travelled to Abbeville, South Carolina by the 15th of April, and then the 17th they moved by wagon train again on to Washington, Georgia, arriving on the 19th, and then in Augusta, Georgia on the 20th.

By this time, LT Parker was unable to locate either President Davis or any member of the Confederate Treasury Department. He had, however, joined forces with a company of men under Captain Tabb back in Charlotte. LT Parker and the CSNA midshipmen were now in a dangerous situation guarding the Confederate treasury as the countryside was filled with bummers and looters tailing along behind Major General William T. Sherman's army. LT Parker was finally able to secure the treasury, composed of coin and bullion, in the vaults of a bank in Augusta, and they remained in Augusta guarding the treasure until the armistice was signed between General Joseph E. Johnston and Major General Sherman. LT Parker declined to disband the midshipman guarding the treasury, and so removed it out of the vaults and returned to Washington, Georgia while searching for President Davis, finally arriving back in Abbeville, South Carolina by the 29th of April. There they stored the treasury in a warehouse, and President Davis and his escort arrived the following day on April 30, accompanied by Secretary Mallory. LT Parker and the midshipmen turned over the treasury to the Acting Secretary of the Treasury, who had them deliver it to Brigadier General Basil W. Duke, commander of the cavalry detachment escorting the President.

On May 2, 1865 after approximately two years of existence, the Confederate Naval Academy ceased to exist when the school members disbanded at Abbeville, South Carolina. LT Parker issued a written order to each midshipman detaching them from the Naval Academy, and after this they were each given $40 in gold to help them reach their homes.

== Alumni ==
"This Patrick Henry may have been a unique institution of learning, but the "Confederate States Naval Academy" turned out men who afterwards became United States Senators, members of Congress, judges, successful bankers, and successful business men as well as sailors."

=== List of prominent alumni ===
Recollections of a Rebel Reefer (1917) by Colonel James Morris Morgan.

- Clifton R. Breckinridge - served in the U. S. House of Representatives
- Jefferson Davis Howell (1846–1875) - youngest brother of Varina Howell Davis, wife of President Jefferson Davis, he captained various steamers, and gave his life saving others in a shipwreck of the mail steamship Pacific
- Colonel John Thomas Scharf - commissioner of Maryland
