= Pinkerton R. Vaughn =

American medal of honor recipient (1839-1866)

Pinkerton Ross Vaughn, Sr.
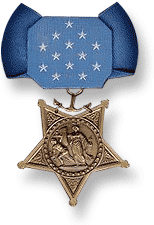
- Medal of Honor
- Born: 1839; Downingtown, Pennsylvania, U.S.
- Died: August 22, 1866 (aged 26–27); Philadelphia, Pennsylvania, U.S.
- Burial place: Laurel Hill Cemetery, Philadelphia, Pennsylvania, U.S.
- Military career
- Allegiance: United States of America; Union
- Branch: United States Marine Corps
- Service years: 1860 - 1864
- Rank: Sergeant
- Unit: USS Mississippi
- Conflicts: American Civil War
- Awards: Medal of Honor

Pinkerton Ross Vaughn Sr. (1839 – August 22, 1866) was a United States Marine Corps sergeant who served during the American Civil War. He was the second Marine to be awarded the Medal of Honor for his actions aboard the USS Mississippi during a battle with Confederate artillery batteries at Port Hudson, Louisiana, on March 14, 1863.

== Biography ==
Vaughn was born in Downingtown, Pennsylvania in 1839, the son of Matthew Vaughn and Ann Vaughn.

He enlisted for military service as his nation was descending into secession and civil war. After enrolling in Philadelphia in October 1860, Vaughn officially mustered in with the U.S. Marine Corps at the Marine Barracks in Philadelphia on October 31. During his service, he obtained the rank of sergeant and served aboard the USS Tennessee and USS Mississippi. The steam-powered and 17-gun warship USS Mississippi was part of the U.S. Navy fleet commanded by Admiral David Farragut that battled with Confederate artillery batteries on March 14–15, 1863, shortly before and prelude to, the Union army's battle and siege of Port Hudson, Louisiana.

On July 10, 1863, Vaughn was awarded the Medal of Honor (Navy version) for his actions during the night of March 14 aboard the Mississippi. He was "commended for zeal and courage displayed in the performance of unusual and trying service while the vessel was aground and exposed to a heavy fire". He was honorably discharged in Philadelphia on November 7, 1864. Vaughn and Sergeant John Mackie (USS Galena) were the first Marines to be awarded the Medal of Honor. While Mackie was the first Marine nominated to receive the award, Vaughn was the first to physically receive the award.

Vaughn returned home to Pennsylvania after he was discharged, and secured work as a brakeman with a trolley company in Philadelphia. On May 18, 1865, he married Elizabeth A. Getty in Philadelphia. A native of New Jersey, she was a daughter of Andrew and Ann Getty. Their only child, Pinkerton Ross Vaughn Jr., was born in February 1866. On August 22, 1866, Vaughn was severely injured in a trolley car accident and died later that day. He was interred at Philadelphia's Laurel Hill Cemetery on August 27. The West Chester Village Record reported on his death as follows:

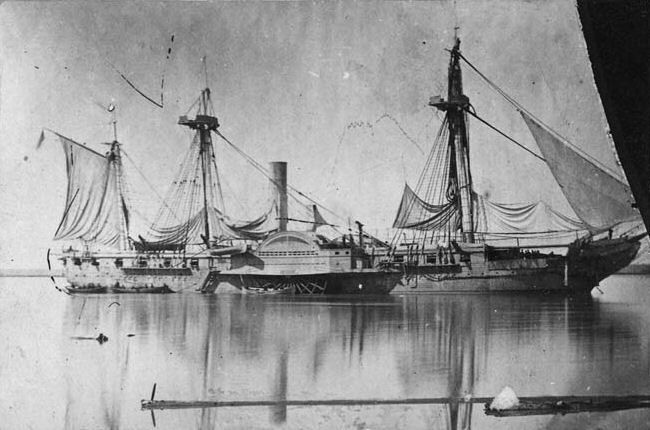
USS Mississippi, circa 1863.

Fatal Accident - On Wednesday, the 22nd, while the 3d stock train on the Penna. rail road was going east, one of the brakemen named Pinkerton R. Vaughn, was struck on the head by an overhead Bridge west of City Avenue, causing death in about 40 minutes. He was 25 years old and leaves a wife and one child. He was buried from his late residence 32d and Bearing st. West Philadelphia. Mr. Vaughn served all through the war in the navy and received a medal of honor from the War Department for bravery while in action. It seems hard that he should meet so untimely a death. M.S. Chalfount of West Chester was the conductor on the train. The parents of the deceased reside at Downingtown.

== Medal of Honor citation ==

Vaughn's Medal of Honor citation reads:

Rank and organization: Sergeant, U.S. Marine Corps.
Born: 1839, Downingtown, Pa.
Accredited to: Pennsylvania.
G.O. No: 17, 10 July 1863.

Citation:

Serving on board the U.S.S. Mississippi during her abandonment and firing in the action with the Port Hudson batteries, 14 March 1863. During the abandonment of the Mississippi which had to be grounded, Sergeant Vaughn rendered invaluable assistance to his commanding officer, remaining with the ship until all the crew had landed and the ship had been fired to prevent its falling into enemy hands. Persistent until the last, and conspicuously cool under the heavy shellfire, Sergeant Vaughn was finally ordered to save himself as he saw fit.

== See also ==
- List of Medal of Honor recipients
- Pennsylvania in the American Civil War
