= Sydney Smith Lee =

Confederate States naval officer (1802 - 1869)

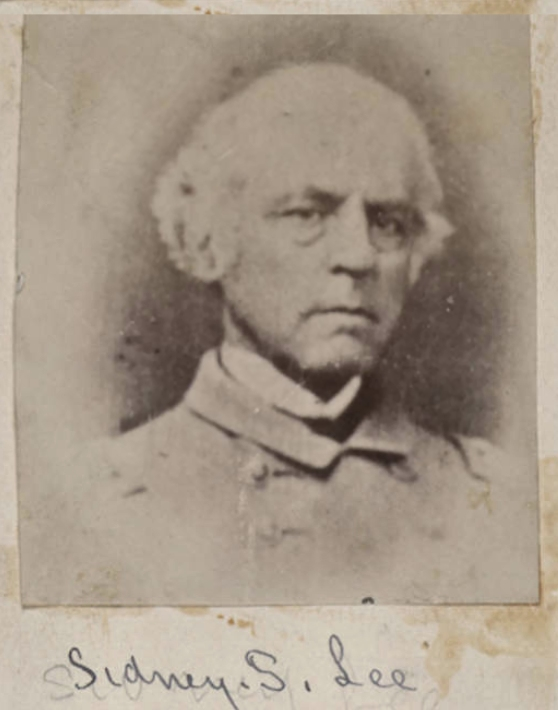
- Born: September 2, 1802; Camden, New Jersey, U.S.
- Died: July 22, 1869 (aged 66); Richland, Stafford County, U.S.
- Burial place: Christ Church Episcopal Cemetery, Alexandria, Virginia, U.S.
- Spouse: Anne Marie Mason
- Relatives: Fitzhugh Lee (son); Henry Lee III (father); Anne Hill Carter (mother); Robert E. Lee (brother)
- Military career
- Allegiance: United States; Confederate States
- Branch: United States Navy; Confederate States Navy
- Service years: 1820–1861 (USN); 1861–1865 (CSN)
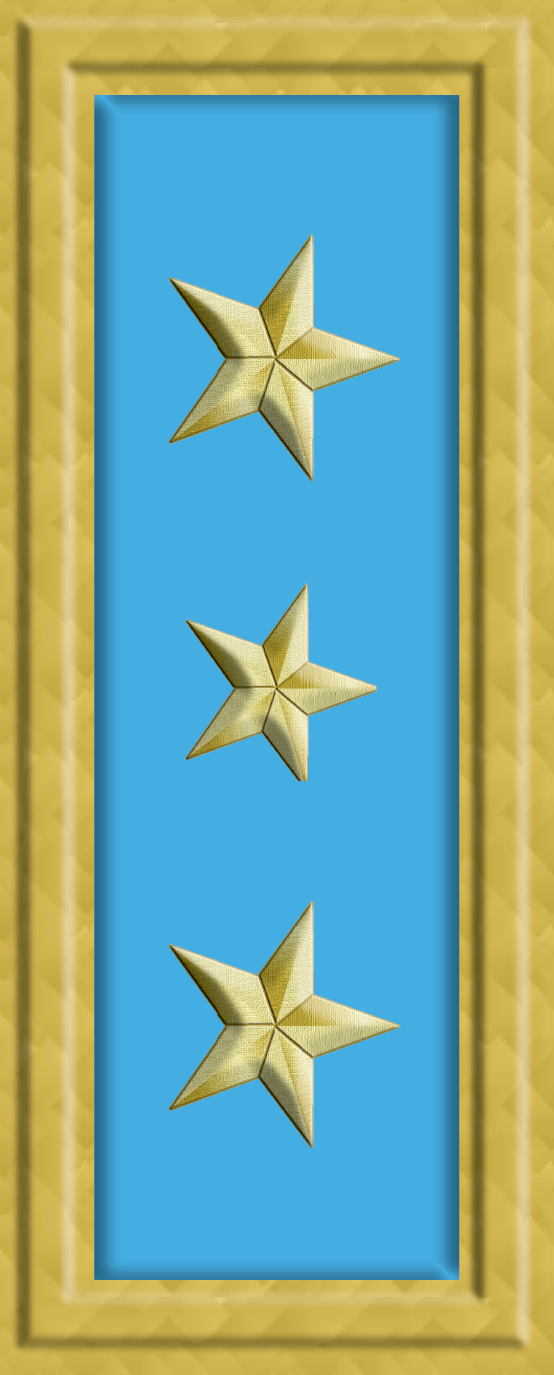
- Rank: Commander (USN) Captain (CSN)
- Commands: USS Mississippi; Gosport Navy Yard; CSN Bureau of Orders and Detail
- Conflicts: Mexican War: Battle of Veracruz; American Civil War

Sydney Smith Lee (September 2, 1802 – July 22, 1869), called Smith Lee in his lifetime, was a Naval officer who served as a Naval officer in the United States navy and in the Confederate States Navy during the American Civil War. He was a descendant of the Lee Family of Virginia, the third child of Henry "Light Horse Harry" Lee and Anne Hill Carter Lee, and the older brother of Confederate general Robert E. Lee.

== Early life and education ==
Lee Family Coat of Arms

Lee was born in Camden, New Jersey, on September 2, 1802. At the age of 18 on December 30, 1820, he was appointed midshipman in the United States Navy and 8 years later promoted to lieutenant on May 17, 1828. During the Mexican–American War Lee fought in the Battle of Veracruz with his brother Robert E. Lee, and afterwards was stationed there. He was promoted to commander on June 4. 1850 and accompanied Commodore Perry to Japan in 1853, commanding his flagship USS Mississippi.

== Career ==
Commander Lee served as commandant of the U.S. Naval Academy and Philadelphia Navy Yard. He resigned from the service on April 17, 1861, the day Virginia declared it had seceded, though the resignation was not accepted. After dismissal on April 22, 1861, he accepted a commission as commander in the Confederate States Navy.

When the U.S. Navy abandoned the Gosport Navy Yard in Norfolk, Virginia, Commander Lee became the commanding officer there. When Union forces regained it, he was put in charge of batteries at Drewry's Bluffs, Virginia. On May 6, 1864, he became chief of the Confederate Navy's Bureau of Orders and Detail, replacing Captain John K. Mitchell. Lee was promoted to captain, and remained at this post until the end of the war.

Lee fought for the Confederacy reluctantly. As late as 1863 he denounced South Carolina for "getting us into this snarl" of secession, complaining that Robert and his family had persuaded him to act against his love of the U.S. Navy.

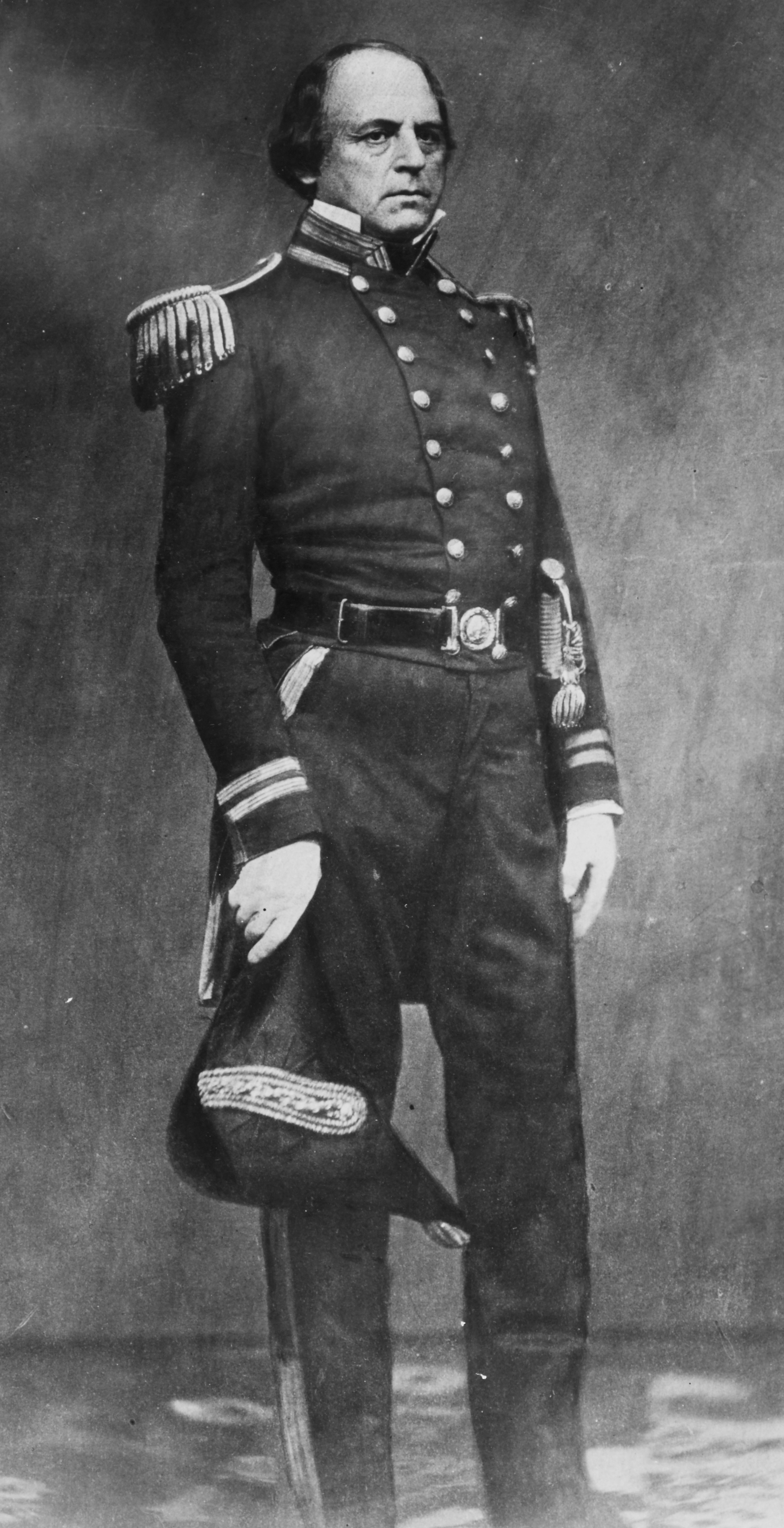
Commander Sidney Smith Lee, USN.

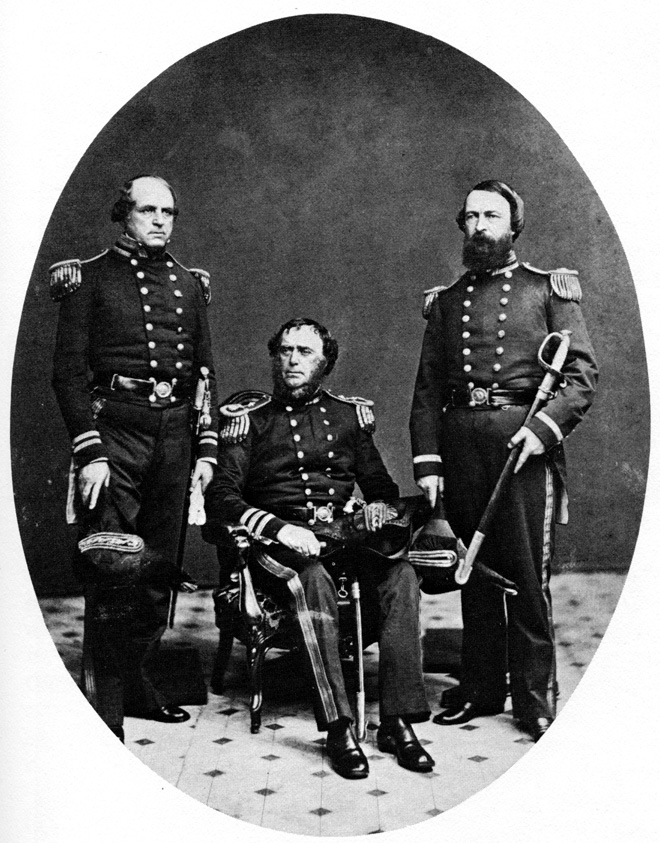
Lee, on the left, in 1860. The other officers are Samuel F. Du Pont and David D. Porter.

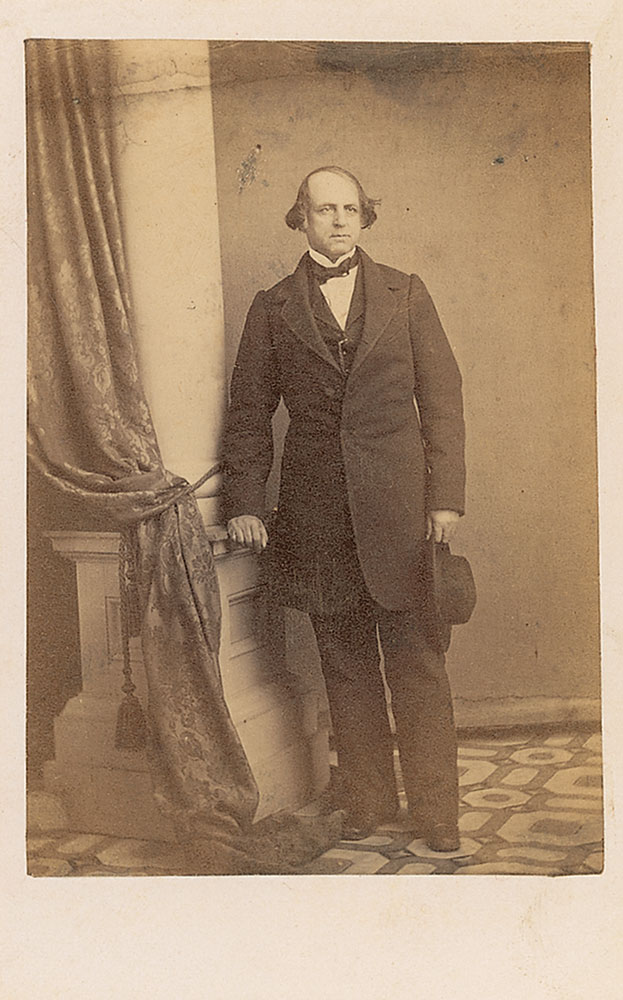
Smith Lee in mufti.

== Family and death ==
Lee's wife was Anne Marie Mason of Virginia. One of their sons was Confederate Major General Fitzhugh Lee who later became Governor of Virginia, diplomat and writer; and served as Major General of U.S. Volunteers during the Spanish–American War. At least four more of his sons served in the Confederate States Army or Navy. After the war Lee became a farmer and died at his residence at Richland in Stafford County, Virginia on July 22, 1869.
