= Surat Presidency =

Presidency of Surat 1608–1687
- Historical era: New Imperialism
| Preceded by | Succeeded by |
| Mughal Empire; Gujarat Subah | Bombay Presidency |
- Today part of: India

Surat Presidency of the East India Company which existed from 1608 to 1687. The presidency was established with the founding of an East India Company factory in the western Indian port city of Surat and was terminated when the presidency's seat was moved to Bombay. At its height, the Presidency included all factories on the west coast of India, including Ahmadabad, Balasore (1655–84), Bombay (1665–87), Hooghly (1655–84). From 1655 to 1684, the president of the Surat factory also exercised his authority over Madras.

== List of presidents at Surat ==
1. Thomas Aldworth, 1613-15
2. Thomas Kerridge, 1616-21
3. Thomas Rastell, 1621-5
4. Thomas Kerridge, 1625-8
5. Richard Wylde, 1628-30
6. John Skibbow (acting), April-September, 1630
7. Thomas Rastell, 1630-1
8. Joseph Hopkinson, 1631-3
9. William Methwold, 1633-9
10. William Fremlin, 1639-44
11. Francis Breton, 1644-9
12. Thomas Merry, 1649-52
13. Jeremy Blackman, 1652-5
14. John Spiller, 1656-7
15. Henry Revington, 1657-8
16. Nathaniel Wyche, 1658-9
17. Matthew Andrews, 1659-62
18. Sir George Oxinden, 1662

== See also ==
- List of tourist attractions in Surat
- Surat Railway Station
- Surat Airport
- Surat BRTS
- Surat Metro
- Surat Metropolitan Region
