= Fort Darling =

Confederate military installation during the American Civil War

Coordinates: 37°25′16″N 77°25′35″W

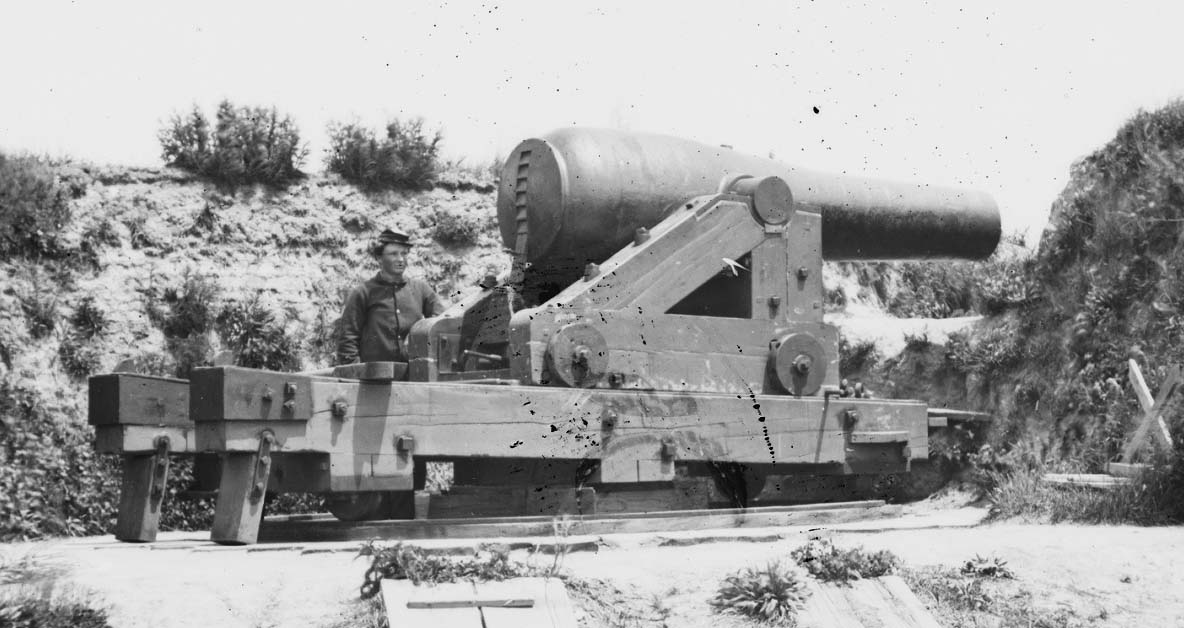
The 10 inch columbiad gun at Fort Darling

Fort Darling (Drewry's Fort, Drewry's Bluff) was a Confederate military installation during the American Civil War located at Drewry's Bluff, a high point of 80–100 feet overlooking a bend in the James River south of Richmond in Chesterfield County, Virginia. It protected the Confederate capital of Richmond from Union naval attacks throughout most of the war.

== Drewry's Bluff ==
On 17 March 1862, Captain Augustus H. Drewry a local landowner (after whom the name Drewry's Bluff is taken) moved in with his artillery unit and began constructing earthworks, defenses and installing three large guns (one ten-inch and two eight-inch columbiads), the installation of which was overseen by General Robert E. Lee's eldest son Brigadier General G.W.C. Lee. Fort Darling was to defend Richmond, the capital of the Confederacy, in anticipation of a Union attack by gunboats from along the river.

== Defenses bolstered and their first test ==
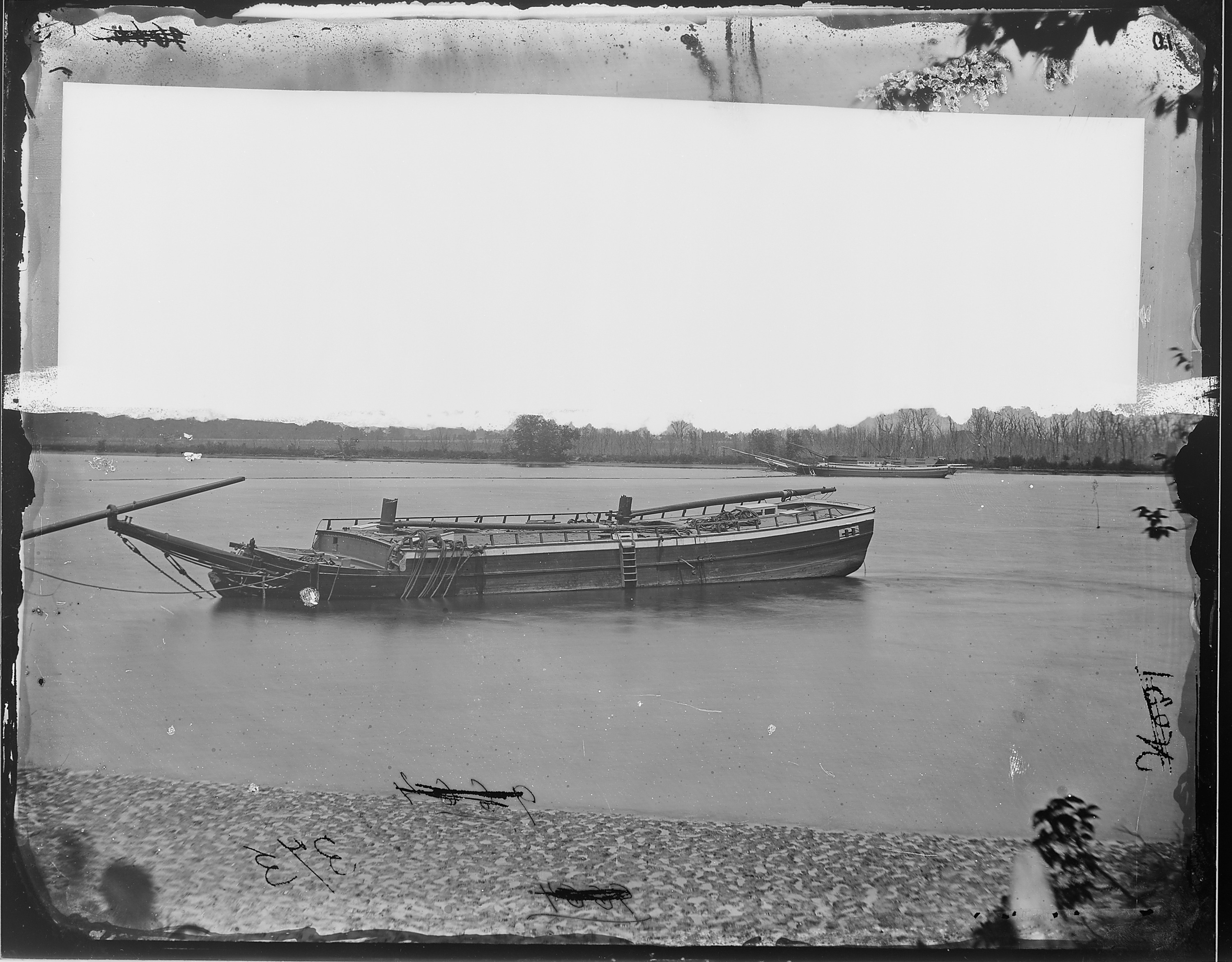
Obstructions placed in the James River around Fort Darling

In May 1862 the garrison was joined by the crew of the CSS Virginia, who had scuttled their ship with the fall of Norfolk on May 9. With them, defenses were expanded further and obstacles sunk into the James River and six more guns placed in a battery upriver. Men worked around the clock for the anticipated battle.

Then on May 15, five Union Navy vessels steamed towards Richmond. Led by Commander John Rodgers, the USS Monitor, USS Galena, Port Royal, Aroostook and Naugatuck engaged the defenses at Fort Darling at 7.45 am. The concussion from the 10-inch gun was so strong that eight miles away the windows in Richmond rattled with the firing of the Confederate's cannons; however, it broke its carriage with the first shot and was inactive for the rest of the battle.

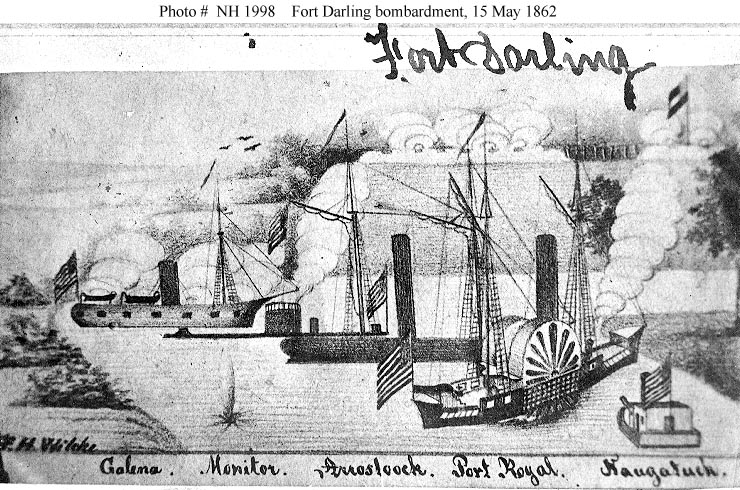
The five Union ships lined up against Fort Darling, Richmond's only defense

For 3 hours and 20 minutes the battle ensued. The fire from Fort Darling high on the bluff and the battery on the riverside made it too dangerous for the three wooden ships to advance, the ironclad Monitor and Galena advanced on the defenders. After 18 hits pierced Galena's armor and caused fires to start, the attack was called off and Rodgers turned around. It became known as the Battle of Drewry's Bluff.

== Preparations ==
For two years Fort Darling saw no more action. In that time the naval Captain Sydney Smith Lee (General Robert E. Lee's brother) took command. Defenses were strengthened along with better accommodations, barracks, chapel, etc. In that time Fort Darling served as a training site for the Confederate States Naval Academy, as well as the Confederate Marine Corps Camp of Instruction.

Then on May 5, 1864, the Union returned, this time landing 30,000 troops at Bermuda Hundred only 15 miles south of Richmond, under the command of Major General Benjamin F. Butler. Within a few days they had reached Fort Darling managing to take over some of the outer defenses, but indecisive generals failed to consolidate their hold. Soon 18,000 Confederate infantry under General P.G.T Beauregard arrived and routed the attackers on May 16. Fort Darling and Richmond had again seen the Union driven off.

== Evacuation ==
Following the Battle of Namozine Church began the evacuation of Petersburg and Richmond on April 2, 1865. The troops, marines and sailors of Fort Darling joined the movement westwards and eventually surrendered after the Battle of Appomattox Court House on April 9. On April 4, the obstacles in the James River were cleared and Abraham Lincoln passed the fort on his way to Richmond.
