= Drewry's Bluff =

Cliff in Chesterfield County, Virginia, US

Coordinates: 37°25′16″N 77°25′35″W

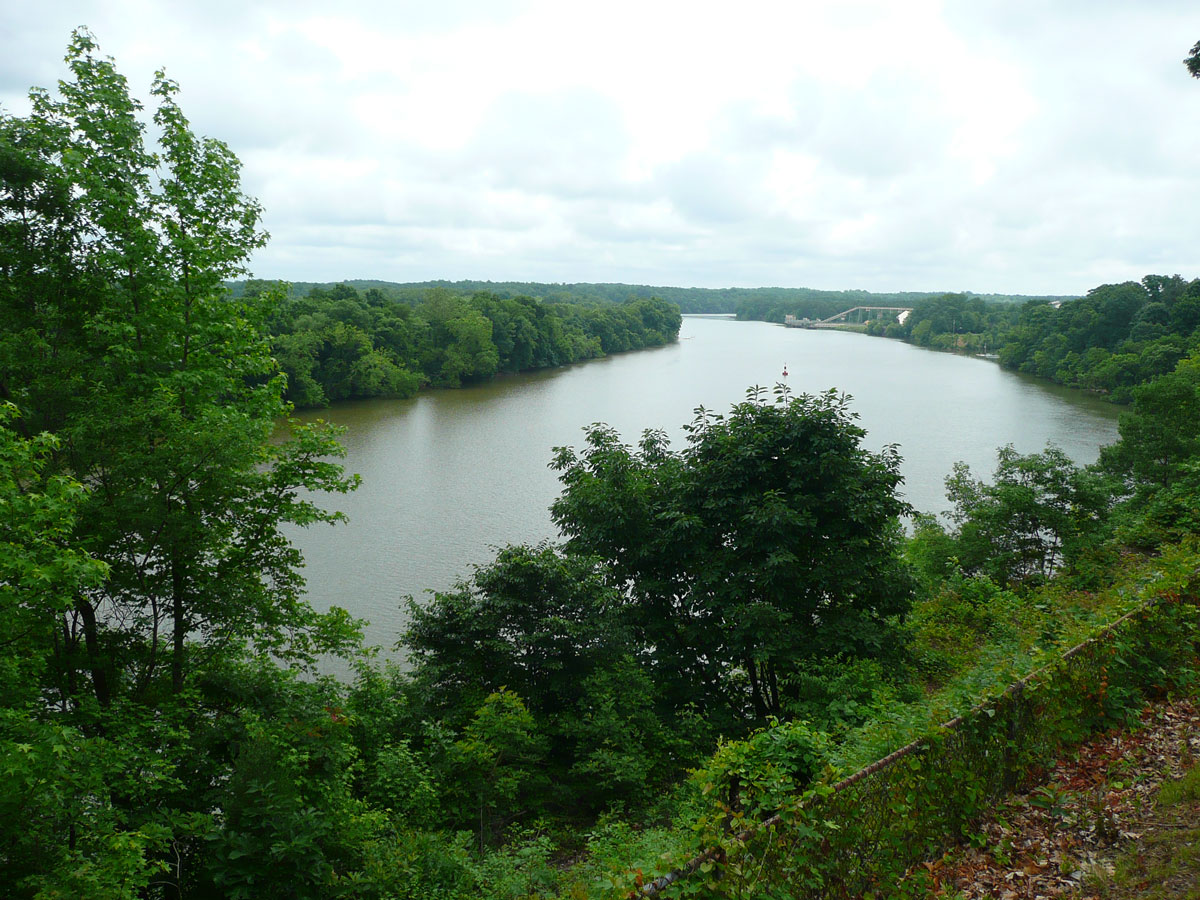
View down the James River from Drewry's Bluff, 2009

Drewry's Bluff is located in northeastern Chesterfield County, Virginia, in the United States. It was the site of Confederate Fort Darling during the American Civil War. It was named for a local landowner, Confederate Captain Augustus H. Drewry, who owned the property.

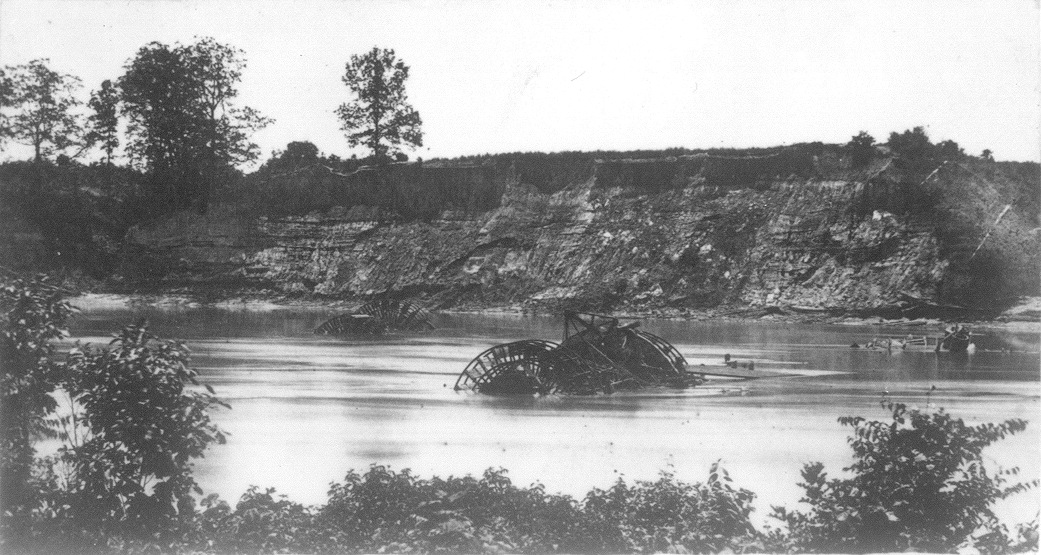
Drewry's Bluff in 1865, photo by Levy & Cohen from collection of U.S. Library of Congress

At Richmond, Virginia, location of the fall line at the head of navigation, the generally west-to-east course of the James River turns almost due south for a distance of about 7 miles (11 km) before turning eastward again towards the Chesapeake Bay. At this sharp bend, Drewry's Bluff on the west side of the James River rose 90 feet (27 m) above the water, commanding a view of several miles' distance downstream and making it a logical site for defensive fortifications.

== During the American Civil War ==
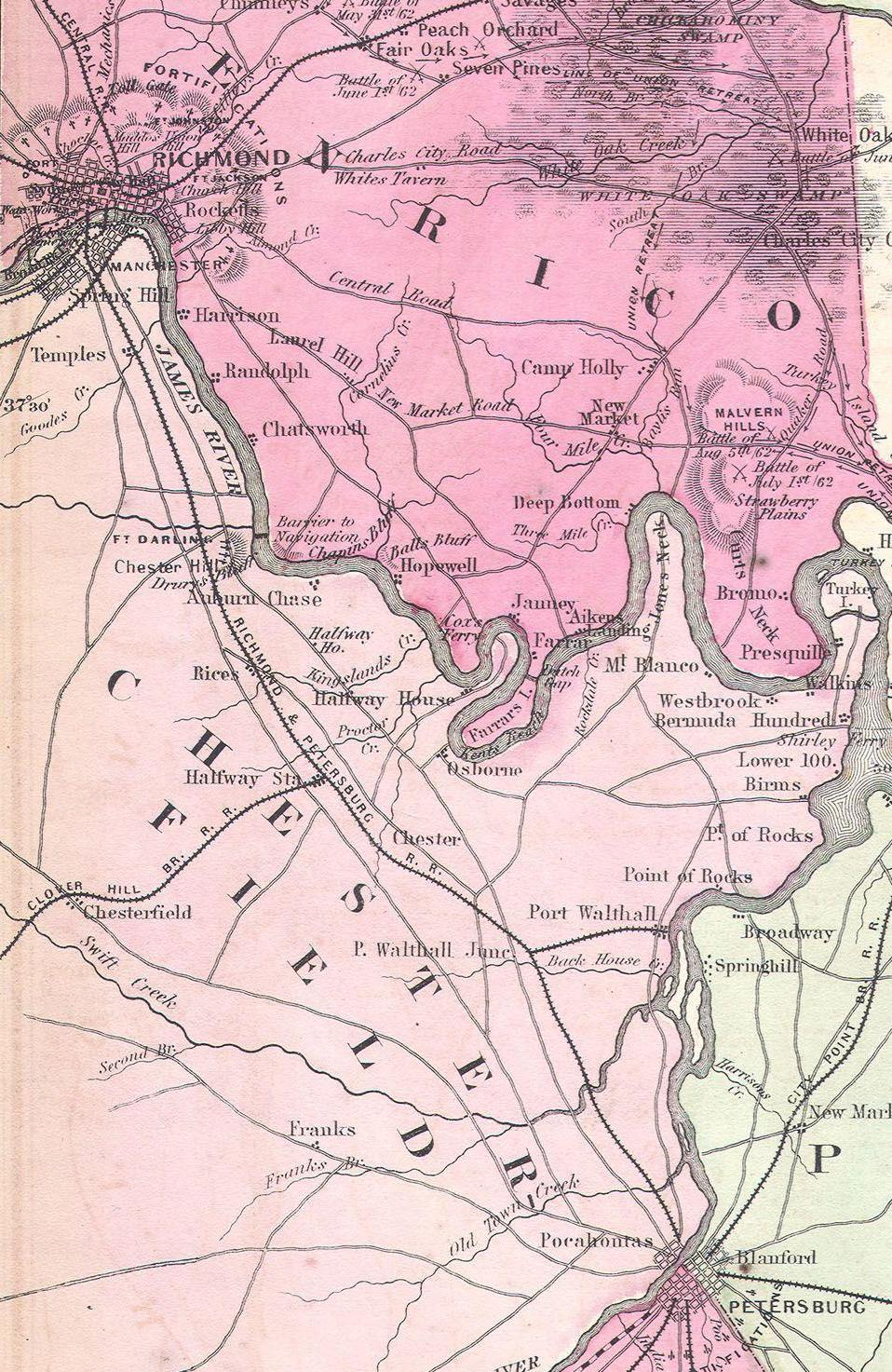
This 1862 map shows Drewry's Bluff at the bend in the river just below the "barrier to navigation."

On March 17, 1862, the men of Captain Drewry's Southside Artillery arrived at the bluff and began fortifying the area. They constructed earthworks, erected barracks, dug artillery emplacements, and mounted three large seacoast guns (one 10-inch Columbiad and two 8-inch Columbiads) in the fort. They were joined in early May by the crew of the Confederate ironclad CSS Virginia which had been scuttled at Craney Island on Hampton Roads to avoid capture as Norfolk fell to Union forces.

Commander Ebeneezer Farrand supervised the defenses of the fort. He ordered numerous ships to be sunk as obstructions in the river beneath the bluff. Six more large guns occupied pits just upriver from the fort. Men worked around the clock to ensure a full state of readiness when the Union fleet arrived.

The Battle of Drewry's Bluff took place on May 15, 1862. After considerable bombardment, the Union Naval vessels retreated, and Richmond was safe from attack by water.

Drewry's Bluff saw no battle action for two years. Captain Sydney Smith Lee (General Robert E. Lee's brother) took command of the site and supervised its expansion and strengthening into a permanent fort. While some workers constructed an outer line of entrenchments to protect the land approach to Richmond, others built improvements for the fort, including a chapel, barracks, and quarters for the officers. During this time, Drewry's Bluff became an important training ground for the Confederate States Naval Academy and the Confederate Marine Corps Camp of Instruction.

On May 5, 1864, Union Major General Benjamin F. Butler and his Army of the James landed at Bermuda Hundred, a neck of land north of City Point at the confluence of the James and Appomattox Rivers, only 15 miles (24 km) south of Richmond. Marching overland, they advanced within three miles (4.8 km) of Drewry's Bluff by May 9. While several Union regiments did manage to capture Fort Darling's outer defenses, delays by Union generals spoiled the success. Confederate infantry under General P. G. T. Beauregard seized the initiative and successfully counterattacked on May 16. Once again a Union drive on Richmond had been defeated at Drewry's Bluff.

The area remained an integral part of Richmond's defense until the fall of Petersburg and Richmond. The garrison at Drewry's Bluff took part in the evacuation of Richmond and Petersburg on April 2–3, 1865. Once Fort Darling had been abandoned by the retreating Confederates, the Union forces quickly cleared a path through the obstructions in the James River beneath Drewry's Bluff. On April 4, 1865, President Abraham Lincoln and his son Tad passed the fort on the way up the James River to visit Richmond.

Soldiers, sailors, and marines from Fort Darling joined the movement westward with Lee's Army of Northern Virginia, ultimately surrendering at Appomattox Court House. Many of the sailors served as infantry during the fighting along the way.

== Civil War Heritage Park and signage ==
The Drewry's Bluff unit of the National Park Service's Richmond National Battlefield Park includes 42 acres (170,000 m^{2}) of this historic land off Interstate 95 south of Richmond. Visitors can stand in the former defense works overlooking what is still a commanding view of the James River.

Two Virginia Historical Highway Markers, # VA-012 and # VA-053, are located on Jefferson Davis Memorial Highway (US Highways 1 & 301) nearby, and commemorate actions relating to Drewry's Bluff. The markers read:

Drewry's Bluff (VA-012), Chesterfield County, May 15, 1862 The James River was virtually undefended after the Confederates evacuated Norfolk and blew up the Virginia in early May. A Union naval advance on Richmond was blocked only by the defenses at Drewry's Bluff, sited ninety feet (27 m) above a turn in the river on the west bank, eight miles (13 km) below the capital. This fort, known to the Federals as Fort Darling, was built on the land of Augustus Drewry. The garrison, commanded by CS Commander Ebenezer Farrand, included the former crew of the Virginia, the Southside Heavy Artillery (led by CS Captain Augustus Drewry), and other units manning the big guns. The Confederates had sunk several boats in the bed of the river to block access to Richmond.

On May 15 five warships of the James River Flotilla under USN Commander John Rodgers steamed up the James River where they were hit by accurate fire from Drewry's Bluff. The shells did little damage to the Monitor, but it was ineffective because the crew could not elevate the ship's guns enough to hit the battery on the bluff. The ironclad Galena was hammered by forty-five hits during the four-hour battle. Confederate sharpshooters along the banks successfully sniped at the sailors and wounded one ship's captain. The effective fire forced Rodgers to take his squadron back downriver, and the U.S. Navy abandoned its attempt to approach Richmond from the river.

Proctor's Creek (Drewry's Bluff), Virginia (VA-053), Chesterfield County, May 12–16, 1864 US General Butler withdrew the Army of the James into the entrenchments at Bermuda Hundred. CS General Beauregard cobbled together a force of 18,000 to confront Butler's 30,000. On May 12 at 4:00 a.m. Butler ordered US General Smith's corps out in a pouring rain to strike north along the Richmond and Petersburg Turnpike to attack the Confederate line at Drewry's Bluff on the James River. This action was designed to cover a cavalry raid by US Brigadier General August V. Kautz against the Richmond & Danville Railroad. Smith soon encountered CS General Hoke's Division deployed along the north bank of Proctor's Creek. The Federals halted to await reinforcements from US General Gillmore's X Corps.

On May 13 Gillmore circled to the west to outflank the Confederate line. Smith pushed across the creek to find that the Confederates had abandoned the works for a stronger fortified position to their rear. Gillmore flanked this line at Wooldridge Hill, and the Confederates retreated again. Beauregard arrived to take command of the Confederates the following day and constructed a new line extending westward from Drewry's Bluff. The Federals dug in before this new line. Butler's cautious advance gave Beauregard time to concentrate his forces. He summoned CS Major General W. H. C. Whiting's Division from Petersburg and planned a converging attack on the Union lines: Whiting would attack northward, hitting Butler's rear, while Hoke and CS General Ransom's Divisions, attacking en echelon from left to right, would drive the Federal right back from Drewry's Bluff.

Ransom, with his right anchored near Fort Stevens, attacked down the Old Stage Road through heavy fog on the morning of May 16. He rolled up the Union line from right to left until his offensive stalled—his troops could not see through the fog. Rather than counterattack, Smith ordered his troops to retreat to the turnpike. Whiting inched northward from Petersburg to Port Walthall Junction but missed the battle. Butler ordered his demoralized army back to Bermuda Hundred that afternoon, ending his offensive against Richmond.

== Train Stop ==
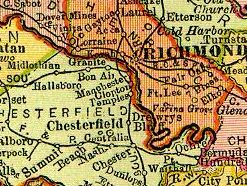
In this 1895 map, Drewry's Bluff is shown as a stop on the Richmond and Petersburg Railroad.

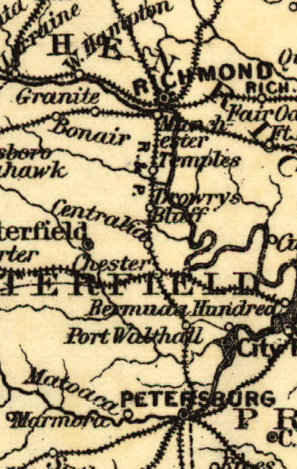
Map from 1891 showing the stops on the Stops on the Richmond and Petersburg.

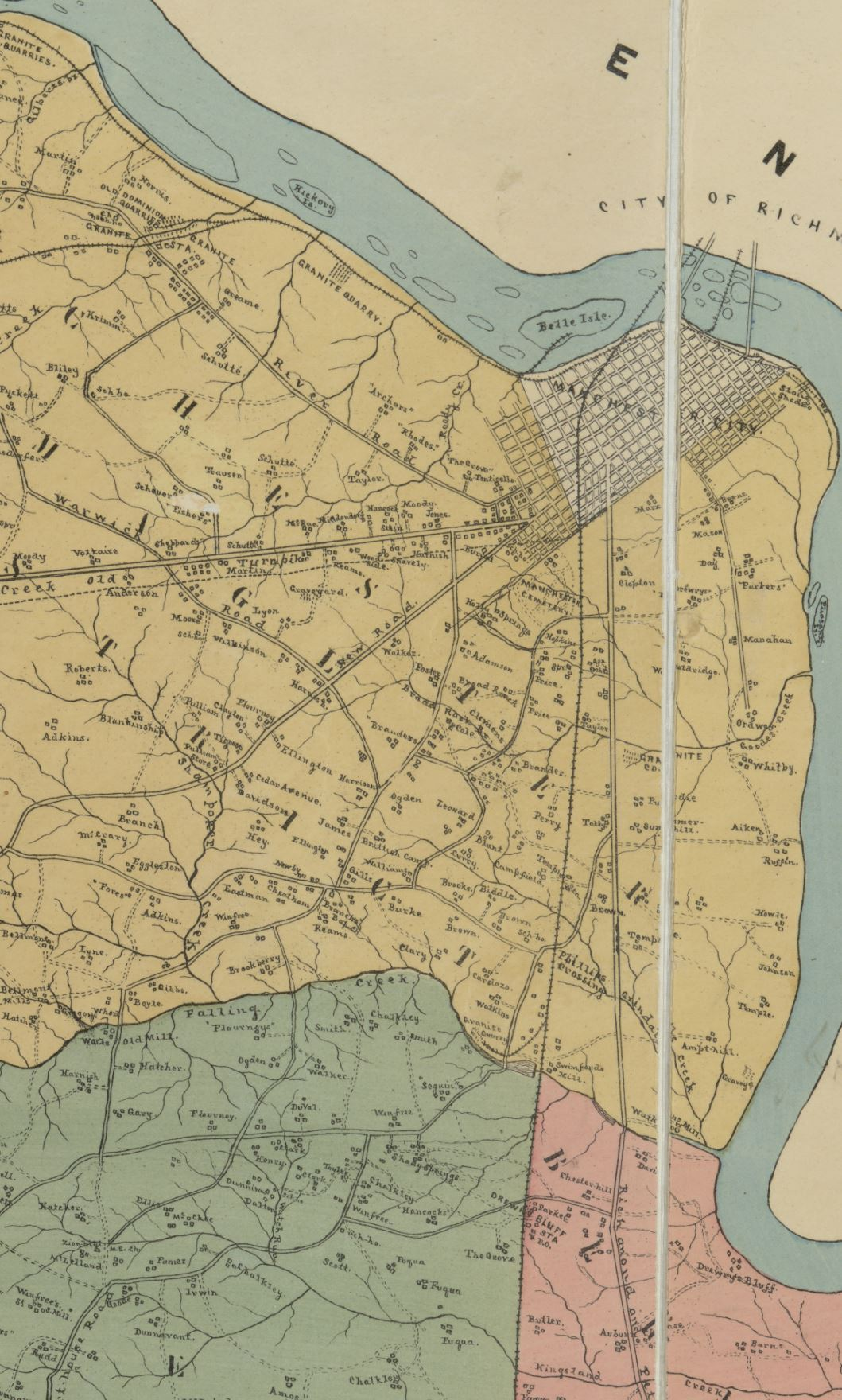
The Drewry's Bluff train stop was just south of the Falling Creek.

After the Civil War, Drewry's Bluff was a stop on the Richmond and Petersburg Railroad between Falling Creek and Kingsland Creek. The Defense Supply Center, Richmond, occupies this site today at Bellwood, Virginia.
