= Columbiad =

Type of large-caliber cannon from the 19th century

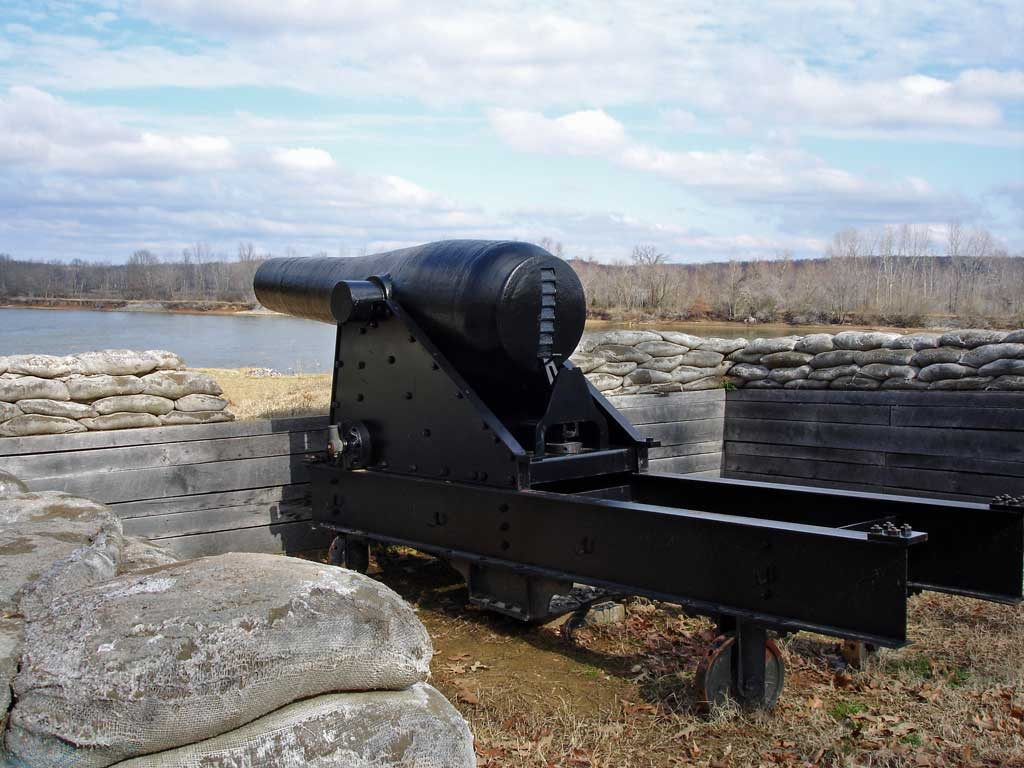
Ten-inch Confederate columbiad at Fort Donelson National Battlefield

The columbiad was a large-caliber, smoothbore, muzzle-loading cannon able to fire heavy projectiles at both high and low trajectories. This feature enabled the columbiad to fire solid shot or shell to long ranges, making it an excellent seacoast defense weapon for its day. The columbiad was first made at the foundry of Henry Foxall on the Potomac in Georgetown for use at Fort Columbus on Governor's Island in New York. Columbiads were used in United States seacoast defense from the War of 1812 until the early years of the 20th century. Very few columbiads were used outside of the U.S. and Confederate Armies; nevertheless, the columbiad is considered by some as the inspiration for the later shell-only cannons developed by Frenchman Henri-Joseph Paixhans some 30 years later.

== History ==
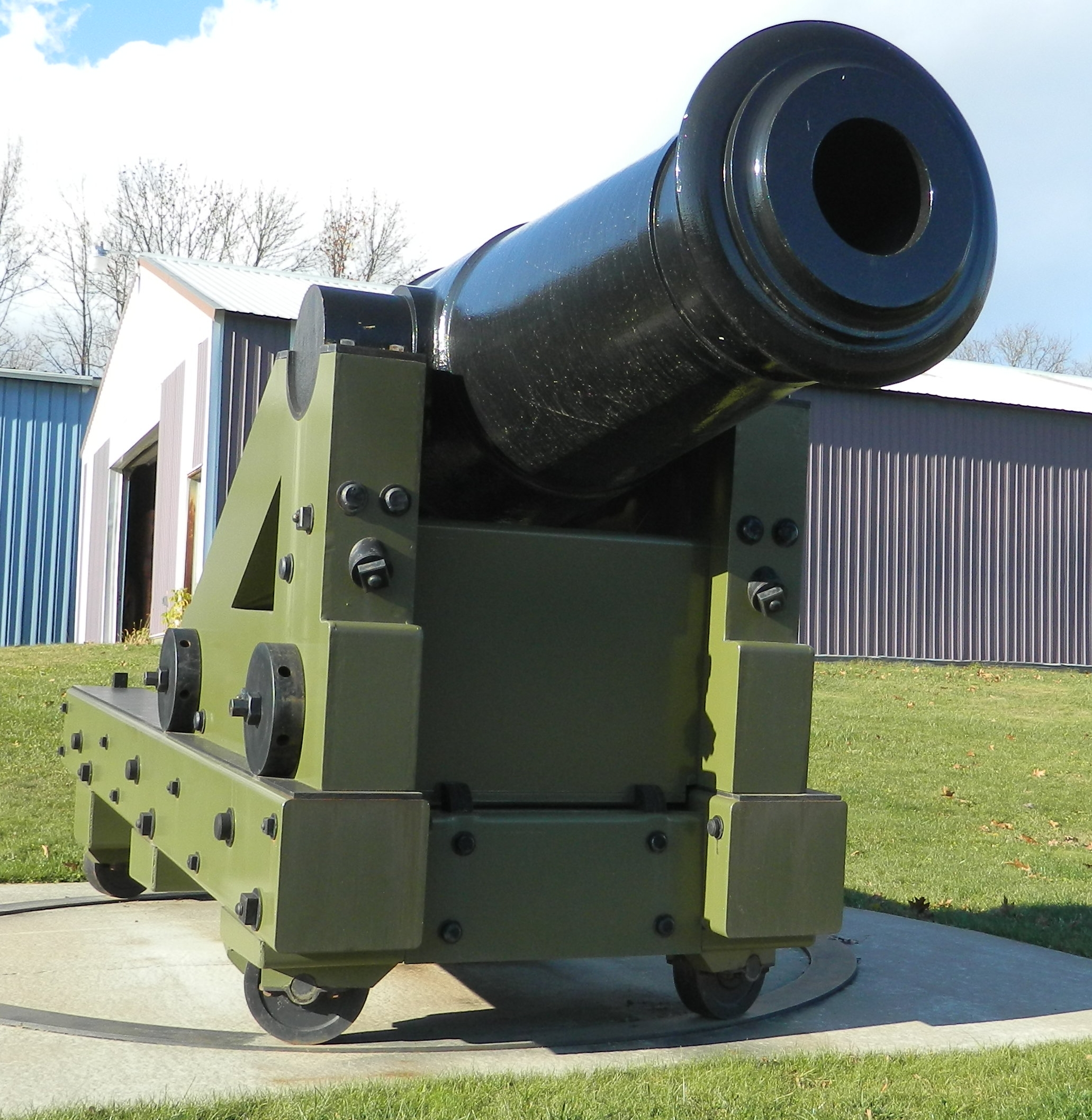

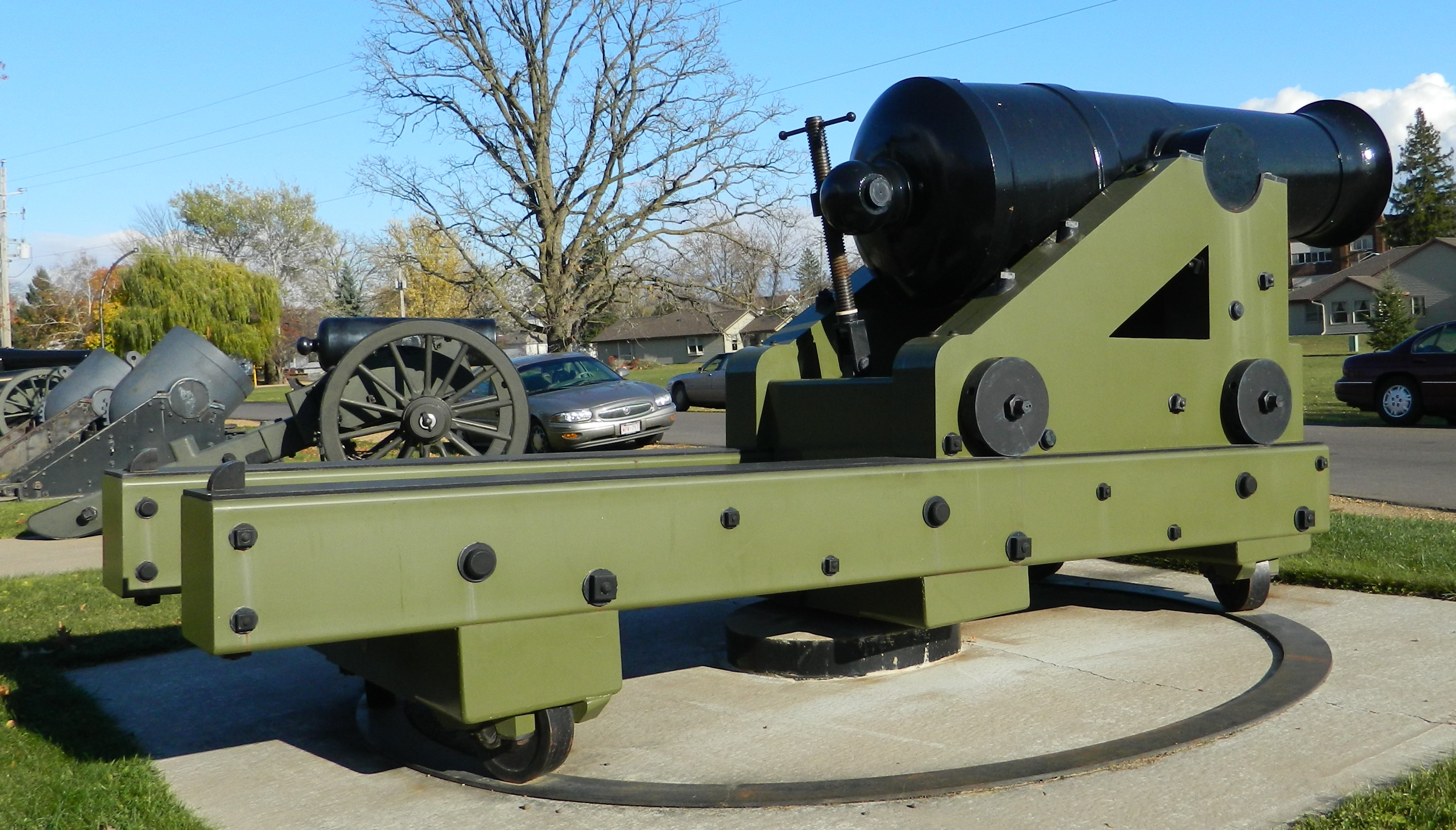
50-pounder Model 1811 columbiad and center-pivot mounting designed by George Bomford as an experimental coastal defense gun. This gun was built in 1811, and was one of the first weapons that were later referred to as columbiads. Photographed in Clear Lake, Wisconsin.

The first columbiads were manufactured by Foxall's foundry for Fort Columbus in 1808. They were described in a letter from Samuel L. Mitchill that was published in the New York Mercantile Advertiser and republished in the Aurora General Advertiser. A footnote on Mitchill's article said "This gun is a new invention, cast at Foxall's foundery, on the Potomac. It is different from the English carronade, and has been proved to carry a shot at the distance of 600 yards through a breastwork thicker than the sides of a ship of the line, with the addition of 8 feet of earth and faschines behind it." Experiments on the utility of the columbiads were carried out by Colonel George Bomford at Greenleaf's Point in Washington in September 1809.

The columbiads produced in 1811 had a 7.25-inch (184 mm) diameter bore and fired a fifty-pound projectile. Although some Second System forts were armed with this weapon, the Army did not widely adopt early columbiads due to initial high costs of manufacture. Only after 1844 did an eight-inch (203 mm) model and a ten-inch (254 mm) model see mass production. The eight-inch (203 mm) columbiad could project a 65-pound shell 4,400 yards (4,000 m) or 4,800 yards (4,400 m) for solid shot; the weapon weighed 9,240 pounds (4,190 kg). The ten-inch (254 mm) columbiad weighed 15,400 pounds (7,000 kg) and hefted a 128-pound shell to 4,800 yards (4,400 m) or solid shot to 5,600 yards (5,100 m). These cast-iron weapons were typically mounted on seacoast carriages designed to recoil up a slightly inclined set of "rails" or wooden beams. The mounted columbiad could pivot left or right on a traversing rail. In most cases the arc of pivot was less than 180 degrees, but some batteries allowed 360-degree traverse.

Just prior to the American Civil War, Ordnance Corps officer Thomas Jackson Rodman developed an improved version of the columbiad, which became known by his name. Specifically the Rodman gun was designed to reduce cracking and other flaws found in such large iron castings. The process involved ensured the iron cooled evenly from the inside out, and resulted in what we might call today a "soda bottle" shaped casting with smooth, tapered exterior. The "Rodman" process also allowed the manufacture of much larger bore columbiads.

Between 1858 and the end of the Civil War, Northern foundries produced eight-inch (203 mm), ten-inch (254 mm), fifteen-inch (381 mm) and twenty-inch Rodman style columbiads. The smaller-bore columbiads shared similar range factors to the older weapons, but the fifteen-inch (381 mm) models weighed over 25 tons and could fire 400-pound projectiles out to 5,000 yards (4,600 m). The monster twenty-inch model weighed over 60 tons but could range to over 5 miles (8.0 km). Very few of the largest types were built, and none were fired in anger during the war. Sling carts were used to transport these guns to the forts where they were emplaced in gun carriages.

The Confederate States also used columbiads extensively, mostly stocks captured from Federal arsenals at the time of secession. These acquitted themselves well against early ironclad warships. In addition, the Confederates produced limited quantities of eight-inch (203 mm) and ten-inch (254 mm) columbiads without the Rodman process; these could not withstand sustained use. The Confederates also rifled some columbiads in an effort to improve weapon performance.

After the Civil War, many columbiads remained in place at seacoast fortifications around the U.S. In the late 1870s several were rifled and tested for use against modern steel-clad ships, with poor results. Strapped for funding, the post-war army continued to carry smooth-bore columbiads on inventory lists until after the Spanish–American War, when modern breech-loading rifled cannon replaced them.

Many columbiads are on display at Federal and state parks, "guarding" courthouses around the United States, as well as in city parks with accompanying historical markers, commemorating the 19th-century seacoast fortifications.

== In fiction ==
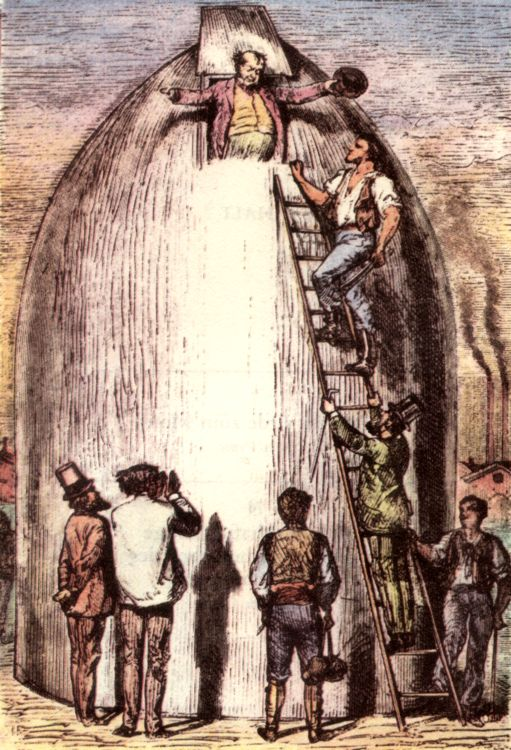
The projectile

In Jules Verne's 1865 novel From the Earth to the Moon, a giant columbiad space gun is constructed in Tampa, Florida after the American Civil War, with the purpose of striking the Moon. Although the cannon is originally designed to fire a hollow aluminum ball, a bullet-shaped projectile is later designed with the purpose of carrying people.

This fictional columbiad is made of cast iron six feet (1.8 m) thick, is 900 feet (270 m) long, and has a bore with a diameter of nine feet (2.7 m). It weighs more than 68,000 short tons (61,700 metric tons or 60,700 long tons) and is therefore cast directly in the ground, rather than being mounted on rails. The cannon is then loaded with 400,000 pounds (180,000 kg) of "pyroxyle" (gun cotton) to give the projectile sufficient velocity to leave Earth's atmosphere and reach the Moon.

A vastly scaled-down depiction of this fictional cannon was built as a launch cannon for the French version of Space Mountain at Disneyland Paris. Originally named "Space Mountain: De la Terre à la Lune", the ride was loosely based on Verne's novel, and the attraction's exterior was built using a Verne-era retro-futuristic influence.

== Gallery ==
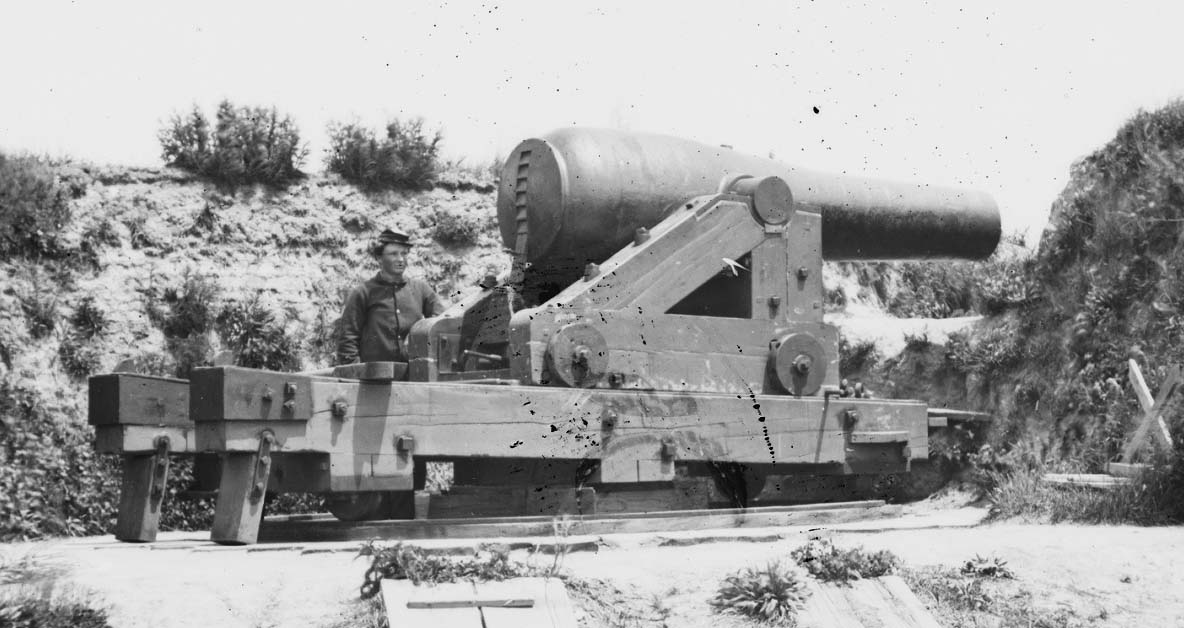
A Confederate 10-inch (254 mm) Rodman columbiad on a center pivot mount in Fort Darling, Virginia, similar to one in Battery Four at Port Hudson, Louisiana. Unlike this mounting, the Port Hudson gun was mounted to fire in any direction, and was so effective that Union troops referred to it as the “Demoralizer”.

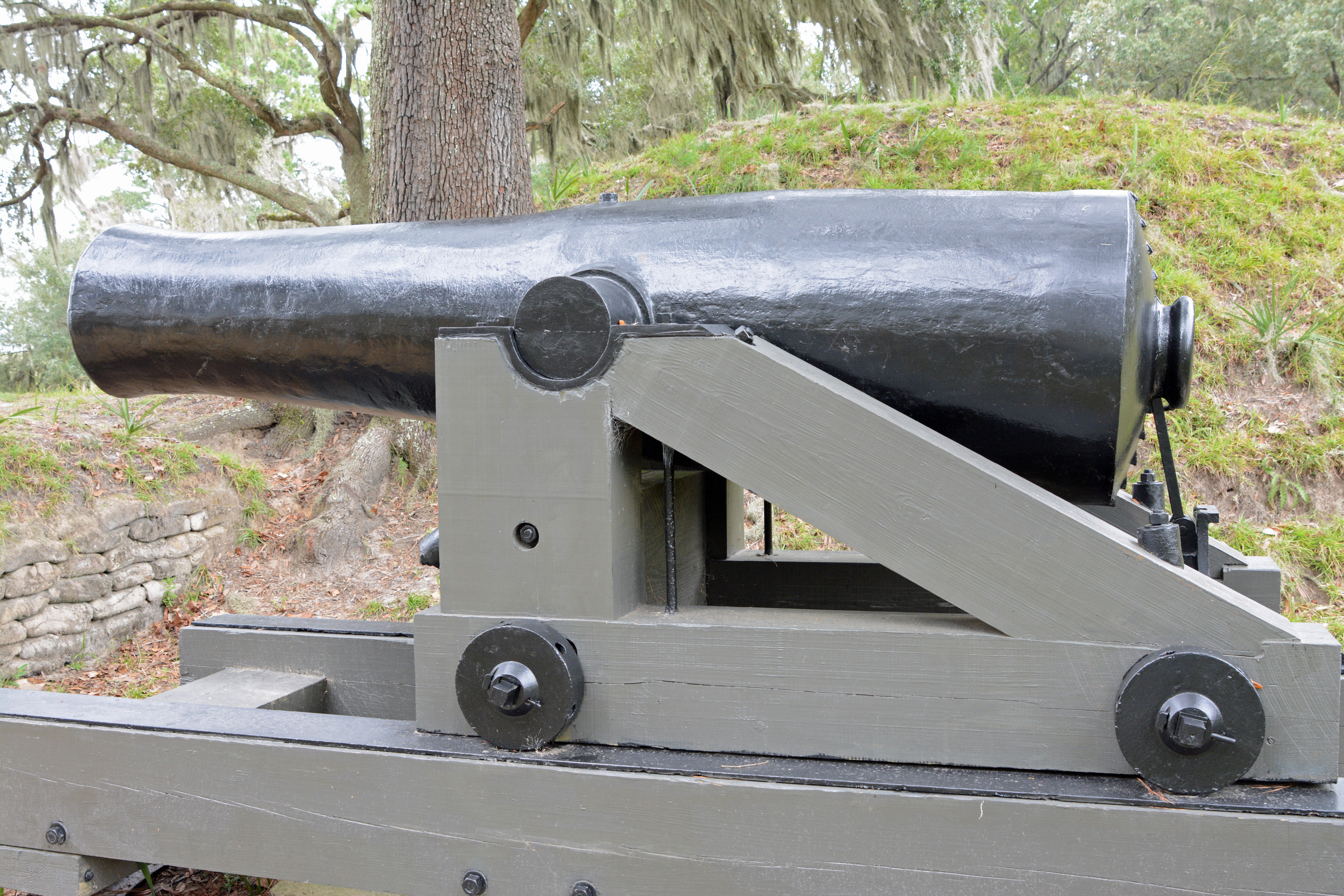
Columbiad (1964 reproduction) at Fort McAllister

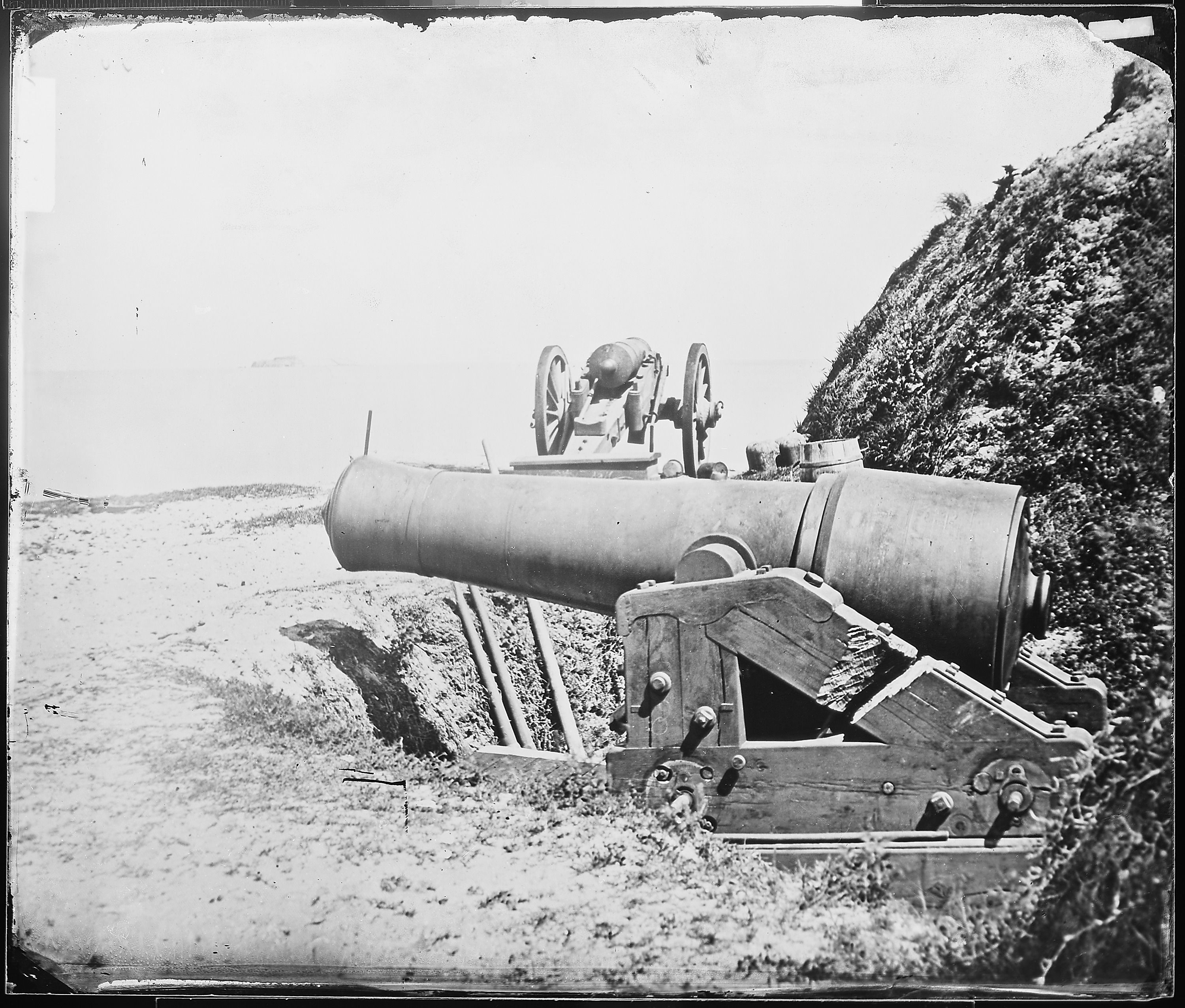
The foreground weapon is a 10-inch Model 1844 columbiad, banded and rifled, recently captured by the Union at Fort Johnson in Charleston Harbor. The carriage has been cut through by the Confederates to deny the weapon's use to the Union.

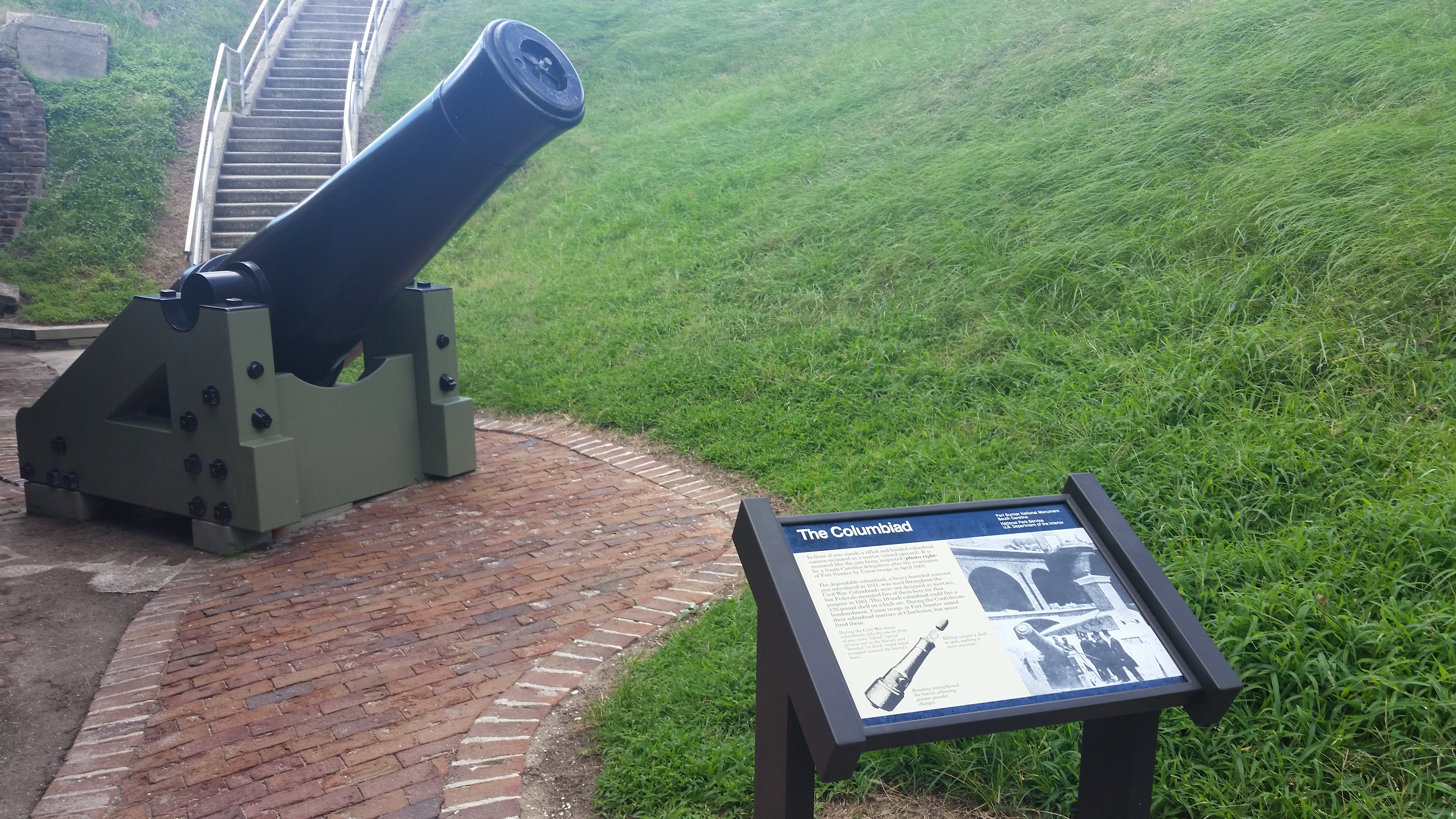
Columbiad at Fort Sumter

== See also ==
- Seacoast defense in the United States
- Dahlgren gun – US Navy equivalent of columbiads
