= List of shipwrecks in October 1838 =

The list of shipwrecks in October 1838 includes ships sunk, foundered, wrecked, grounded, or otherwise lost during October 1838.

== 2 October ==
List of shipwrecks: 2 October 1838
Ship	State	Description
Catherina Elizabeth	Denmark	The ship was sighted in the Øresund whilst on a voyage from Copenhagen to the Clyde. No further trace, presumed foundered with the loss of all hands.
Eleanor	United Kingdom	The ship ran aground on the Domesnes Reef, off the coast of Norway and sank. Her crew were rescued. She was on a voyage from Kirkcaldy, Fife, to Riga, Russia.
Java	United Kingdom	The ship was driven ashore and wrecked at Montrose, Forfarshire. Her crew were rescued. She was on a voyage from Montrose to Newcastle upon Tyne, Northumberland.
John and Eliza	United Kingdom	The ship ran aground on the Herd Sand, in the North Sea off the coast of County Durham. She was refloated and taken into South Shields, County Durham.
Marquis of Sligo	United Kingdom	The ship was driven ashore at Aarhus, Denmark. She was on a voyage from Königsberg, Prussia, to Leith, Lothian.
William Hill	United Kingdom	The steamship was holed by her anchor and was beached at Hull, Yorkshire.

== 3 October ==
List of shipwrecks: 3 October 1838
Ship	State	Description
Beatrice	United Kingdom	The ship departed from Malta for Liverpool, Lancashire. No further trace, presumed foundered with the loss of all hands.
Gesina	Netherlands	The ship departed from Terschelling, Friesland, for Newcastle upon Tyne, Northumberland, England. No further trace, presumed foundered in the North Sea with the loss of all hands.
Glisden	United Kingdom	The brig was driven ashore at Blackhouse, Hampshire.
Newburgh	United Kingdom	The ship departed from St. Ubes, Portugal, for Liverpool. No further trace, presumed foundered with the loss of all hands.
Osprey	United Kingdom	The ship ran aground on the Middle Grounds, off the coast of Denmark. She was on a voyage from Hartlepool, County Durham, to Memel, Prussia. Osprey was later refloated and resumed her voyage.
Rurick	(Russian Empire) Grand Duchy of Finland	The ship ran aground on the Borthanger. She was on a voyage from London, England, to Pori.

== 4 October ==
List of shipwrecks: 4 October 1838
Ship	State	Description
Gregory Bogorsloff	Russia	The ship ran aground off Helsingør, Denmark. She was on a voyage from Liverpool, Lancashire, England, to Reval. Gregory Bogorsloff was refloated on 7 October.
Guard	United Kingdom	The schooner ran aground on the Stag Rocks. She was on a voyage from Newcastle upon Tyne, Northumberland, to Plymouth, Devon. Guard was refloated on 6 October and taken into Plymouth.
Lipton	United Kingdom	The ship ran aground on the Shipwash Sand, in the North Sea off the coast of Essex. She was abandoned the next day. Lipton was on a voyage from Newcastle upon Tyne to London.
Neptune	United Kingdom	The ship was wrecked on the Shipwash Sand, in the North Sea off the coast of Essex. Her crew were rescued. She was on a voyage from Newcastle upon Tyne to London.

== 5 October ==
List of shipwrecks: 5 October 1838
Ship	State	Description
King David	United Kingdom	The ship ran aground, capsized and was wrecked in the River Afan.

== 6 October ==
List of shipwrecks: 6 October 1838
Ship	State	Description
Broughty Castle	United Kingdom	The ship was run down and sunk by Duchess of Orleans (United States). Broughty Castle was on a voyage from Swansea, Glamorgan, to Gibraltar.
Cæsar	United Kingdom	The ship was driven ashore at Patras, Greece. She was on a voyage from Patras to London. Cæsar was later refloated and resumed her voyage.
Endeavour	United Kingdom	The ship departed from Weymouth, Dorset, for Hull, Yorkshire. No further trace, presumed foundered with the loss of all hands.

== 7 October ==
List of shipwrecks: 7 October 1838
Ship	State	Description
Dove	United Kingdom	The schooner was wrecked at Cape Coast Castle, Africa Her crew were rescued.
St. Jacques	France	The ship was driven ashore and wrecked between "Abretshamn" and Ystad, Sweden. Her crew were rescued. She was on a voyage from Stockholm to Saint-Malo, Ille-et-Vilaine.

== 8 October ==
List of shipwrecks: 8 October 1838
Ship	State	Description
Lady Ann	United Kingdom	The ship was driven ashore on the south point of Anticosti Island, Lower Canada, British North America.

== 9 October ==
List of shipwrecks: 9 October 1838
Ship	State	Description
Activa	Portugal	The ship was wrecked on the Shipwash Sand, in the North Sea off the coast of Essex, England. Her crew were rescued. She was on a voyage from Newcastle upon Tyne, Northumberland, England, to Porto.
Gryphia	Greifswald	The ship was driven ashore south of Dragør, Denmark. She was on a voyage from Griegswald to Dundee, Forfarshire, Scotland. Gryphia was refloated the next day and taken into Copenhagen, Denmark.
Retreat	United Kingdom	The schooner was wrecked on the Anegada Reef. She was on a voyage from Saint Thomas, Virgin Islands to Trinidad.

== 10 October ==
List of shipwrecks: 10 October 1838
Ship	State	Description
Charlestown	United Kingdom	The ship departed from Alloa, Clackmannanshire, for Dundee, Forfarshire. No further trace, presumed foundered with the loss of all hands.
Earl Dalhousie	United Kingdom	The ship ran aground on the Virgin Rock, off Hogland, Russia, and was abandoned by her crew. She was on a voyage from Saint Petersburg, Russia, to Hull, Yorkshire.
Emerald	United Kingdom	The ship ran aground on the Pampus Sand, in the North Sea off the coast of Zeeland, Netherlands. She was on a voyage from Ipswich, Suffolk, to Hellevoetsluis, Zeeland.
Isaac Newton	United Kingdom	The ship was driven ashore at Newcastle, Ohio, United States. She was later refloated and taken into Portsmouth, Ohio, where she arrived on 12 October.
Josephine	Sweden	The ship was wrecked on the Finn Ground. Her crew were rescued. She was on a voyage from "Wista Werft" to Stockholm.
Nelly	United Kingdom	The ship was wrecked near Cape Ray, Newfoundland, British North America. She was on a voyage from Wexford to Quebec City, Lower Canada, British North America.
Protector	United Kingdom	The East Indiaman was wrecked near Calcutta, India, with the loss of 170 of the 178 people on board.
Stadt Colberg	Kolberg	The ship ran aground on the Dogger Bank, in the North Sea. She was on a voyage from London, England, to Kolberg. Stadt Colberg was later refloated and put in to "Kulfsund".
Swan	United Kingdom	The ship was driven ashore in Tramore Bay. She was on a voyage from Cork to Ross-on-Wye, Herefordshire. Swan was refloated the next day and resumed her voyage.
Three Sisters	United Kingdom	The sloop foundered off the Point of Ayr, Cheshire, with the loss of one of her three crew. She was on a voyage from Sligo to Liverpool, Lancashire.
Ulla	Sweden	The ship was lost in the "Alendschen Schœen". Her crew were rescued. She was on a voyage from Rotterdam, South Holland, Netherlands, to Gävle.
Victoria	United Kingdom	The ship was wrecked on Hogland. She was on a voyage from Liverpool to Saint Petersburg.

== 11 October ==
List of shipwrecks: 11 October 1838
Ship	State	Description
Beta	Hamburg	The ship was sighted off Dover, Kent, England, whilst on a voyage from Matanzas, Cuba, to Hamburg. No further trace, presumed foundered with the loss of all hands.
Dart	United Kingdom	The ship foundered off Sark, Channel Islands, with the loss of two of her four crew. She was on a voyage from Brixham, Devon, to Jersey, Channel Islands.
Eugene	France	The ship was lost near Dénia, Spain, with the loss of all but two of her passengers and crew. She was on a voyage from Marseille, Bouches-du-Rhône to Martinique.
Europa	United Kingdom	The ship ran aground whilst on a voyage from Greenock, Renfrewshire, to Havana, Cuba. She was later refloated. She was refloated on 15 October.
Flora	United Kingdom	The ship struck the Middle Patch, in Liverpool Bay and was damaged. She was on a voyage from Memel, Prussia to Flint.
Henry	United Kingdom	The ship was driven ashore and wrecked near Fraserburgh, Aberdeenshire. She was on a voyage from South Shields, County Durham, to Thurso, Caithness.
Hope	United Kingdom	The steam tug was impaled on unmarked iron debris at the mouth of Sunderland harbour, and sank. Her crew were rescued.
Jane	United Kingdom	The brig was driven ashore and wrecked at Ackergill, Caithness. Her crew were rescued.
John	United Kingdom	The sloop was driven ashore at Troon, Ayrshire.
Margaret and Ann	United Kingdom	The ship was abandoned in the North Sea off Whitby, Yorkshire, but her crew were all drowned.
Maria	United Kingdom	The ship was wrecked on Sanda Island. Her crew were rescued. She was on a voyage from Glasgow, Renfrewshire, to Tobermory, Isle of Mull.
Northern Yacht	United Kingdom	The paddle steamer foundered in the North Sea off Berwick upon Tweed, Northumberland, with the loss of all 23 people on board. She was on a voyage from Newcastle upon Tyne, Northumberland, to Leith, Lothian.
Phœbe	United Kingdom	The ship departed from Newcastle upon Tyne, Northumberland, for Dublin. No further trace, presumed foundered with the loss of all hands.
Rainswell	United Kingdom	The ship was driven ashore at Hull, Yorkshire. She was on a voyage from Hull to Saint Petersburg, Russia. She was refloated on 15 October and resumed her voyage.
Sailor's Return	United States	The ship was wrecked off Cape São Roque, Brazil. She was on a voyage from Newport, Rhode Island, to the South Seas.
Sheldrake	United Kingdom	The ship ran aground on the North Rock, in the Irish Sea and was damaged. She was on a voyage from London to Larne, County Antrim. Sheldrake was later refloated.
Swan	United Kingdom	The ship was driven ashore in Tramore Bay. She was on a voyage from Cork to Ross-on-Wye, Herefordshire. Swan was refloated the next day.

== 12 October ==
List of shipwrecks: 12 October 1838
Ship	State	Description
Adventure	United Kingdom	The ship capsized 150 nautical miles (280 km) off Copenhagen, Denmark. Her crew were rescued by Judith (United Kingdom). Adventure was on a voyage from Newcastle upon Tyne, Northumberland, to Copenhagen.
Alderman Thompson	United Kingdom	The brig was driven ashore near Thurso, Caithness. She was on a voyage from Quebec City, Lower Canada, British North America, to Hull, Yorkshire. Alderman Thompson was refloated in August 1839 and towed into Wick, Caithness.
Berlin	Prussia	The ship ran aground on the Arkona Reef, in the Baltic Sea. She was on a voyage from Stettin to Sunderland, County Durham, England. She was later refloated and put into Copenhagen, Denmark or Swinemünde, Prussia.
Elizabeth	United Kingdom	The ship was driven ashore and wrecked at Blyth, Northumberland. Her crew were rescued.
Haabet	Denmark	The ship was wrecked near "Lemwig", Denmark with the loss of five or six of her crew. There were two survivors. She was on a voyage from London, England, to Svendborg.
Jane	United Kingdom	The ship was driven ashore in Sinclair's Bay. She was refloated on 19 November and taken into Akkergill.
Jessie Ann	United Kingdom	The ship caught fire and foundered in the North Sea off the Carr Rock with the loss of a crew member. Survivors were rescued by Thomas (United Kingdom). Jessie Ann was on a voyage from Sunderland to Perth.
Maryann	United Kingdom	The ship foundered in the North Sea off Bridlington, Yorkshire, with the loss of all hands. She was on a voyage from Newcastle upon Tyne, Northumberland, to Montrose, Forfarshire.
Sisters	United Kingdom	The ship was driven ashore on the "Seam". She was later refloated.
Tam o'Shanter	United Kingdom	The paddle tug sank in the West India Docks, London.
Trimmer	United Kingdom	The sloop sank in Robin Hoods Bay. Her crew were rescued.
Union	United Kingdom	The paddle steamer was driven ashore at Maryport, Cumberland. She was on a voyage from Liverpool, Lancashire, to Maryport.
Venus	United Kingdom	The ship was driven ashore in the Menai Strait. She was on a voyage from Limerick to Liverpool, Lancashire. Venus was later refloated and taken into Beaumaris, Anglesey.

== 13 October ==
List of shipwrecks: 13 October 1838
Ship	State	Description
Barbara	United Kingdom	The ship was driven ashore and wrecked at Whitby, Yorkshire. She was on a voyage from Scarborough, Yorkshire, to Newcastle upon Tyne, Northumberland.
Beatrice	United Kingdom	The ship departed from Malta for Liverpool, Lancashire. No further trace, presumed foundered with the loss of all hands.
Britannia	United Kingdom	The ship was driven ashore and severely damaged near Sunderland, County Durham. Her crew were rescued. She was on a voyage from South Shields, County Durham, to Leith, Lothian. Britannia was later refloated and towed into Berwick upon Tweed, Northumberland.
Carl Auguste	Stettin	The ship was driven ashore north of Helsingør, Denmark. She was on a voyage from Sunderland to Stettin. Carl Auguste was later refloated and taken into Helsingør.
David	United Kingdom	The ship was driven ashore near Whitby.
Gotha	Sweden	The schooner ran aground on the Goodwin Sands, Kent, England, and was abandoned by her crew. She was on a voyage from Bordeaux, Gironde, France, to Hamburg. Gotha was refloated and taken into Dover, Kent.
Grev Bernstoff	Flag unknown	The ship foundered off Cabo Espichel, Portugal.
Hoffnung	Kingdom of Hanover	The ship was driven ashore at Whitby with the loss of at least one of her crew.
Hope	United Kingdom	The steamship was driven ashore and wrecked near Sunderland. Her crew were rescued.
Isabella	United Kingdom	The ship was wrecked on a reef off Lindisfarne, Northumberland. Her crew were rescued.
James and Thomas	United Kingdom	The ship was driven ashore and wrecked near Sunderland. Her crew were rescued by the Sunderland Lifeboat. She was refloated on 24 October and taken into Sunderland.
Jessie Ann	United Kingdom	The ship caught fire and sank off the Farne Islands, Northumberland.
Margaret and Ann	United Kingdom	The sloop foundered in the North Sea off Whitby with the loss of all five of her crew. She was on a voyage from Newcastle upon Tyne to Montrose, Forfarshire.
Maria	United Kingdom	The ship was wrecked near Thisted, Denmark. Her crew were rescued. She was on a voyage from Newcastle upon Tyne to Skive, Denmark.
Maria	Spain	The ship ran aground and was damaged in the Gulf of Palma and was damaged. She was on a voyage from Cádiz to Genoa, Kingdom of Sardinia. Maria was later refloated and arrived at Genoa in a leaky condition.
Nancy	United Kingdom	The ship was driven ashore and wrecked at Goswick, Northumberland. Her crew were rescued. She was on a voyage from Newcastle upon Tyne to Dundee, Forfarshire.
Regent Packet	United Kingdom	The ship was driven ashore at Falkenberg, Sweden. She was later refloated and put into Varberg for repairs.
Safety	United Kingdom	The ship was driven ashore and severely damaged near Sunderland. Her crew were rescued. She was on a voyage from South Shields to Eyemouth, Berwickshire.
Saturnus	Lübeck	The ship was driven ashore on the coast of the Grand Duchy of Finland. She was on a voyage from Lübeck to Kronstadt, Russia. Saturnus was later refloated; she arrived at Kronstadt on 28 October.
Trave	Lübeck	The ship was driven ashore on the coast of Holstein. She was on a voyage from Saint Petersburg, Russia, to Lübeck.
Varro	United Kingdom	The ship sank at Sunderland. She was raised on 24 October.
Vesta	United Kingdom	The ship sank at South Shields. Her crew were rescued. She was on a voyage from Liverpool to South Shields.

== 14 October ==
List of shipwrecks: 14 October 1838
Ship	State	Description
Hellegina	Netherlands	The galiot capsized off Eierland, North Holland, and was driven ashore there. She was on a voyage from Rotterdam, South Holland, to Hamburg.
Henry and Jane	United Kingdom	The ship ran aground on the Shipwash Sand, in the North Sea off the coast of Essex. She was on a voyage from Liverpool, Lancashire, to Newcastle upon Tyne, Northumberland. Henry and Jane was refloated and put into Great Yarmouth, Norfolk.
Magdalena	Denmark	The ship was driven ashore on Kronslot Island, off Kronstadt, Russia. She was on a voyage from Copenhagen to Kronstadt.
Octorara	United States	The ship was driven ashore at Stony Point, New York. She was on a voyage from Liverpool, Lancashire, England, to Philadelphia, Pennsylvania. Octorara was later refloated.
Sir Edward	United Kingdom	The schooner was driven ashore at Shoreham-by-Sea, Sussex. Her crew were rescued. She was on a voyage from London to Liverpool, Lancashire. Sir Edward was refloated on 18 October and taken into Shoreham-by-Sea in a severely damaged condition.
Thomas	United Kingdom	The ship was driven ashore at Maryport, Cumberland. She was on a voyage from Dublin to Maryport. Thomas was refloated the next day and taken into Maryport.
Welcome	United Kingdom	The ship ran aground in the Sound of Hoy. She was on a voyage from Lerwick, Shetland Islands, to Bristol, Gloucestershire.
Wickengen	Sweden	The ship ran aground south of Helsingør, Denmark. She was on a voyage from Sundsvall to Cette, Hérault, France. Wickengen was later refloated and taken into Helsingør for repairs.

== 15 October ==
List of shipwrecks: 15 October 1838
Ship	State	Description
Bodvil	United Kingdom	The ship was driven ashore at Newhaven, Sussex. She was on a voyage from London to Liverpool, Lancashire. Bodvil was later refloated and taken into Newhaven.
Breeze	United Kingdom	The ship was driven ashore and wrecked at Point Escuminac, New Brunswick, British North America. She was on a voyage from Liverpool, Lancashire, to Quebec City, Lower Canada, British North America.
Christina	Sweden	The ship ran aground on the Sandhammer. She was on a voyage from "Doderhulstwick" to Copenhagen, Denmark.
Commerce	(United Kingdom of Great Britain and Ireland) Jersey	The ship struck a sunken rock in St Catherine's Bay and foundered. Her crew were rescued.
Edward	United Kingdom	The schooner was wrecked on the Horse Bank, in the Irish Sea off Southport, Lancashire. Her crew were rescued. She was on a voyage from Drogheda, County Louth, to Liverpool.
Gondola	United Kingdom	The ship was driven ashore at Cardiff, Glamorgan.
Lady Eleanor	United Kingdom	The ship was driven ashore at Maryport, Cumberland. She was on a voyage from Cardiff to Maryport. Lady Eleanor was later refloated and taken into Maryport.
Maria Caroline	Prussia	The ship sprang a leak and foundered between "Lealand" and Fehmarn, Duchy of Schleswig. Her crew were rescued She was on a voyage from Hull, Yorkshire, England, to Memel.
Po	United Kingdom	The ship was abandoned off the Long Sand, in the North Sea off the coast of Essex. Her crew were rescued by Supply (United Kingdom). Po was later taken into Aldeburgh, Suffolk.

== 16 October ==
List of shipwrecks: 16 October 1838
Ship	State	Description
Anne Nicolai	Norway	The ship was driven ashore near Ringkøbing, Denmark. Her crew were rescued. She was on a voyage from Drammen to Calais, France.
Eden	United Kingdom	The ship was lost near Ringkøbing. She was on a voyage from London to Bergen, Norway.
Felix	Netherlands	The ship was driven ashore in the White Sea. Her crew were rescued. She was on a voyage from Arkhangelsk, Russia, to Amsterdam, North Holland.
Fortuna	Stralsund	The ship was wrecked on the Dogger Bank. Her crew were rescued. She was on a voyage from Dublin, Ireland, to Stralsund.
John and James	United Kingdom	The ship was run down and sunk in the North Sea off the mouth of the River Tees. Her crew were rescued.

== 17 October ==
List of shipwrecks: 17 October 1838
Ship	State	Description
Ann Grant	United Kingdom	The ship was driven ashore and wrecked at Donegal. Her crew were rescued. She was on a voyage from Quebec City, Lower Canada, British North America, to Greenock, Renfrewshire.
China	United Kingdom	The ship sprang a leak and was abandoned in the Atlantic Ocean. Her crew were rescued by Navarino (United Kingdom). China was on a voyage from Saint John, New Brunswick, British North America, to Dublin.
Ivanhoe	United Kingdom	The ship was driven ashore and wrecked near Whitby, Yorkshire. Her crew survived.
Mary Ann	United Kingdom	The ship was driven ashore in the Dardanelles. She was on a voyage from London to Constantinople, Ottoman Empire.
Quebec	United Kingdom	The ship was driven ashore near Aberystwyth, Carmarthenshire. She was refloated on 31 October and taken into Aberystwyth.
Swallow	United Kingdom	The brig sprang a leak and was abandoned in the North Sea off Texel, North Holland, Netherlands. She was on a voyage from Great Yarmouth, Norfolk, to Hull, Yorkshire.
Wave	United Kingdom	The ship ran aground on the Arklow Bank, in the Irish Sea off the coast of County Wicklow. She floated off but consequently foundered. Her crew were rescued. She was on a voyage from London to Liverpool, Lancashire.

== 18 October ==
List of shipwrecks: 18 October 1838
Ship	State	Description
Colborne	United Kingdom	The barque was wrecked on Point Macron in Chaleur Bay with the loss of 43 of the 55 people on board. She was on a voyage from London to Quebec City, Lower Canada, British North America.
Eilda	Sweden	The ship was driven ashore and wrecked at Pomle Nakke, Falster, Denmark. Her crew were rescued. She was on a voyage from Stockholm to "Haderleben".
Eldora	Hamburg	The ship was wrecked on Düne, Heligoland. Her crew were rescued. She was on a voyage from Liverpool, Lancashire, England, to the Eider.
Guyana	United Kingdom	The ship was driven ashore at Calcutta, India.
Haabets Anker	Norway	The ship ran aground off "Rekekrok".
Ocean	Netherlands	The ship capsized and sank at New York, United States.
Rainha Dos Angos	Portugal	The ship was dismasted and abandoned at sea.
Sterling	United Kingdom	The ship was wrecked near Gaspé, Lower Canada. She was on a voyage from Liverpool to Quebec City.

== 19 October ==
List of shipwrecks: 19 October 1838
Ship	State	Description
Constance	Norway	The ship foundered off Stavanger. She was on a voyage from Ostend, West Flanders, Belgium, to Bergen.
Elvira	United Kingdom	The ship ran aground on the Kettlebottom Sand, or the Haisborough Sands, in the North Sea and was damaged. She was later refloated and put into Great Yarmouth, Norfolk.
Gesina	Danzig	The ship foundered off Rixhöft, Prussia. She was on a voyage from Danzig to Edam, North Holland, Netherlands.
Henry and Elizabeth	United Kingdom	The ship ran aground on the Barton Sand and was severely damaged. She was later refloated and taken into Great Yarmouth.
HMS Malabar	Royal Navy	The Repulse-class ship of the line ran aground off Prince Edward Island, British North America, and was damaged. Two of her crew were lost. She was refloated the next day and towed into Three Rivers, Lower Canada, British North America.
Maria Bertha	Netherlands	The ship was driven ashore and wrecked at Petten, North Holland. Her crew were rescued. She was on a voyage from Liverpool to Rotterdam, South Holland.
Petersburg	United Kingdom	The ship was wrecked on "Millemache". She was on a voyage from Liverpool, Lancashire, to Quebec City, Lower Canada.
Phoenix	Stettin	The ship ran aground on a reef west of Swinemünde, Prussia. She was on a voyage from Sunderland, County Durham, England, to Stettin.
Ramona	United Kingdom	The paddle steamer was driven into the pier at Calais, France, and was severely damaged, losing one of her paddle wheels. She was on a voyage from London to Calais.
Seine	France	The ship ran aground on the Falsterbo Reef, in the Baltic Sea off the coast of Sweden. She was on a voyage from Havre de Grâce, Seine-Inférieure, to Saint Petersburg, Russia.
Venskabet	Lübeck	The ship was wrecked off Fjaltring, Denmark. Her crew were rescued. She was on a voyage from Newcastle upon Tyne, Northumberland, England, to Lübeck.
Wellington	United Kingdom	The ship was driven ashore on the Rodahund, Kingdom of Hanover. She was on a voyage from Newquay to Saint Petersburg. Wellington was later refloated and taken into "Capelshaven" for repairs.

== 20 October ==
List of shipwrecks: 20 October 1838
Ship	State	Description
Eliza	United Kingdom	The smack was driven ashore on Little Skerry and was abandoned by her crew. She subsequently became a wreck.
Elizabeth and Juliana	Denmark	The galleass was driven ashore between Rønne and Læsø with the loss of all hands. She was on a voyage from Newcastle upon Tyne, Northumberland, England, to Haderslev.
Friendship	United Kingdom	The ship foundered in the North Sea off Scarborough, Yorkshire. Her crew were rescued. She was on a voyage from Seaham, County Durham, to London.
Gilius	Sweden	The ship was driven ashore at "Jacobsoe". She was on a voyage from Honfleur, Manche, France, to Malmö.
Gleaner	United Kingdom	The ship was driven ashore and wrecked south of Workington, Cumberland. She was on a voyage from the Isle of Man to Workington.
Grace	United Kingdom	The ship was driven ashore at Swansea, Glamorgan. She was later refloated and taken into Swansea.
Henrietta	Stettin	The ship was driven ashore near "Voglern", Prussia.
Mogul	France	The ship was driven ashore at Fairlight, Sussex, England. She was on a voyage from Havre de Grâce, Seine-Inférieure, to Nantes, Loire-Inférieure. Mogul was later refloated and taken into Dover, Kent, England.
Sophia	Danzig	The ship was abandoned off Düne, Heligoland. She was on a voyage from Dundalk, County Louth, Ireland, to Danzig.
Vier Gebreoder	Kolberg	The ship was driven ashore near "Neuking", Prussia.
Walter Hamilton	United Kingdom	The brig ran aground at Ness, Lewis, Outer Hebrides. She was on a voyage from Lerwick, Shetland Islands, to Cork.

== 21 October ==
List of shipwrecks: 21 October 1838
Ship	State	Description
Arendina Maria	Prussia	The ship was driven ashore in the Bay of Held. Her crew were rescued.
Carl	Prussia	The ship was driven ashore at "Lopponen", Prussia. Her crew were rescued. She was on a voyage from Wolgast to Königsberg.
Caroline	Denmark	The ship was driven ashore at Sarkau, Prussia. She was on a voyage from Rügenwalde, Prussia, to Copenhagen.
Devon	United Kingdom	The ship was driven ashore and severely damaged at Cape Bear, Nova Scotia, British North America. She was on a voyage from Glasgow, Renfrewshire, to Quebec City, Lower Canada, British North America. Devon was later refloated and put into Pictou, Nova Scotia, where she arrived on 23 October.
Earl Grey	United Kingdom	The ship was wrecked at Miramichi, New Brunswick, British North America. She was on a voyage from London to Miramichi.
Elida	Denmark	The ship was wrecked off "Pomle Hakke". Her crew were rescued. She was on a voyage from Stockholm to Hadersleben.
Eendragt	Netherlands	The ship was driven ashore at Thisted, Denmark. She was on a voyage from Drammen, Norway, to Harlingen, Friesland.
Emma	Prussia	The ship was driven ashore on the Nordergrunden, in the Baltic Sea off the coast of Prussia. She was on a voyage from Leith, Lothian, Scotland, to Memel.
Frau Maria Margaretha	(Denmark) Duchy of Schleswig	The ship was driven ashore in the Bay of Skovgaard. All on board were rescued. She was on a voyage from Aalborg, Denmark, to Flensburg.
Friends	United Kingdom	The ship was driven ashore in the Elbe. She was on a voyage from Hamburg to Seaham, County Durham. She was refloated and taken into Gluckstadt.
Harmonie	Norway	The ship was driven ashore at "Tejemageln". She was on a voyage from Lisbon, Portugal, to Bergen.
Helena Sofia	Sweden	The ship was driven ashore at Mörbylånga. Her crew were rescued. She was on a voyage from Ystad to Figeholm.
Hvalfisken	Sweden	The ship was driven ashore between Lisbjerg and Tisvilde, Denmark. She was on a voyage from Stockholm to Paimbœuf, Loire-Inférieure, France.
Miranda	United Kingdom	The ship ran aground at Southwold, Suffolk. She was on a voyage from Saint Petersburg, Russia, to Liverpool, Lancashire. Miranda was refloated on 23 October.
Orpheus	Netherlands	The ship was wrecked on the coast of Jutland. She was on a voyage from Saint Petersburg to Amsterdam, North Holland.
Stjernan	Norway	The ship was wrecked near "Whitingsoe". Her crew were rescued. She was on a voyage from Bergen to Flekkefjord.
Toronto	(United Kingdom of Great Britain and Ireland) British North America	The ship ran aground at Lake Saint Pierre, Lower Canada. She was on a voyage from London to Montreal, Lower Canada. Toronto was refloated the next day.

== 22 October ==
List of shipwrecks: 22 October 1838
Ship	State	Description
Borussia	Russia	The ship was driven ashore at Ventspils. Her crew were rescued.
Dasserdt	France	The ship was wrecked near Marstrand, Sweden. She was on a voyage from Saint Petersburg, Russia, to Bordeaux, Gironde.
Friendship	United Kingdom	The ship was wrecked in Dundrum Bay. She was on a voyage from Bangor, County Down, to Berwick upon Tweed, Northumberland.
Newton	United Kingdom	The ship was driven ashore near Pillau, Prussia. She was on a voyage from Memel, Prussia to Sunderland, County Durham.
Oscar	United Kingdom	The ship was driven ashore and wrecked near Wick, Caithness.
Schwan	Stettin	The ship was driven ashore near Landskrona, Denmark. Her crew were rescued. She was on a voyage from an English port to Stettin.
Stranger	United Kingdom	The ship was wrecked in Dundrum Bay. She was on a voyage from Liverpool, Lancashire, to Londonderry.
Tito	Netherlands	The ship sank at Cuxhaven. She was on a voyage from Odesa to Amsterdam, North Holland.

== 23 October ==
List of shipwrecks: 23 October 1838
Ship	State	Description
Bloom	United Kingdom	The schooner was wrecked at St. John's Point, near Killough, County Down, with the loss of three of her six crew. She was on a voyage from Bangor, Caernarfonshire, to Dysart, Aberdeenshire.
Brothers	United Kingdom	The ship was driven ashore and severely damaged in Tramore Bay. She was on a voyage from Maryport, Cumberland, to Ross-on-Wye, Herefordshire. She was refloated on 3 November and taken into Waterford.
Friendship	United Kingdom	The schooner was driven ashore and wrecked at Tyrella, County Down. Her crew were rescued. She was on a voyage from Bangor, County Down, to Berwick upon Tweed, Northumberland.
Helen	United Kingdom	The ship was driven ashore in Åland, Sweden. Her crew were rescued. She was on a voyage from Saint Petersburg, Russia, to Dundee, Forfarshire.
Herald	United Kingdom	The ship was wrecked on the east coast of Öland, Sweden. Her crew were rescued. She was on a voyage from Saint Petersburg to Dundee.
Lady Charlotte	United Kingdom	The brig was wrecked on the Barrels Rocks, 6 nautical miles (11 km) off Cape Clear Island, County Cork, with the loss of ten of her eleven crew. She was on a voyage from Lima, Peru, to Liverpool, Lancashire.
Lucy	United Kingdom	The ship was driven ashore at Dungeness, Kent. She was on a voyage from Saint Petersburg to Liverpool. Lucy was later refloated and put into Dover, Kent.
Peckel and Helena	Netherlands	The galiot was driven ashore on Texel, North Holland.
Stranger	United Kingdom	The brig was wrecked in Dundrum Bay. Her crew were rescued. She was on a voyage from Liverpool, Lancashire, to Londonderry.
Wonder	United Kingdom	The sloop was wrecked on the Elbow End, at the mouth of the River Tay. Her crew were rescued. She was on a voyage from Leith, Lothian, to Dundee, Forfarshire.

== 24 October ==
List of shipwrecks: 24 October 1838
Ship	State	Description
Areland	Flag unknown	The ship ran aground on the Sakkesand, in the Baltic Sea off Nyord, Denmark. She was on a voyage from Uusikaupunki, Grand Duchy of Finland, to Rostock. Areland was refloated on 27 October.
Daisy	United Kingdom	The ship ran aground in the River Dee and was severely damaged. She was on a voyage from Chester, Cheshire, to Dublin. Daisy was refloated and put into Beaumaris, Anglesey.
Harriet	United Kingdom	The ship sprang a leak and was beached at Cork. She was on a voyage from Bristol, Gloucestershire, to Cork.
Hoffnung	Stettin	The ship sprang a leak and was beached near Coserow, Prussia. She was on a voyage from Bo'ness, Lothian, Scotland, to Stettin.
Lang	United Kingdom	The ship was wrecked near Pugwash, Nova Scotia, British North America. She was on a voyage from London to Pugwash.

== 25 October ==
List of shipwrecks: 25 October 1838
Ship	State	Description
Abeona	United Kingdom	The ship was driven ashore and wrecked near Lybster, Caithness. Her crew were rescued. She was on a voyage from Aberdeen to Lybster.
Dorcas	United Kingdom	The brig departed from Hartlepool, County Durham, for Hamburg. No further trace, presumed foundered with the loss of all hands.
Frau Anna	Hamburg	The ship struck a rock in the Eider and was beached. Her crew were rescued. She was on a voyage from Neuenfelde to Copenhagen, Denmark.
Hendrika	Netherlands	The ship was sighted off Rendsburg, Duchy of Holstein whilst on a voyage from Wismar to Amsterdam, North Holland. No further trace, presumed foundered with the loss of all hands.
Henriette	Prussia	The ship was driven ashore between Danzig and Pillau.
Margery	United Kingdom	The ship was driven ashore on Saltholm, Denmark. She was refloated but was consequently beached on the Middle Ground. Margery was on a voyage from Saint Petersburg, Russia, to London. Margery was refloated and put into Copenhagen, Denmark.
Robert	United Kingdom	The smack foundered in the North Sea off Scarborough, Yorkshire. Her crew were rescued by a Barking smack. She was on a voyage from South Shields, County Durham, to Brightlingsea, Essex.

== 26 October ==
List of shipwrecks: 26 October 1838
Ship	State	Description
Ann	United Kingdom	The ship was wrecked on the south coast of Bornholm, Denmark. Her crew were rescued. She was on a voyage from Memel, Prussia to Stockton-on-Tees, County Durham.
Canada	United Kingdom	The ship was driven ashore on Skagen, Denmark, where she was subsequently wrecked. Her crew and four passengers were rescued. She was on a voyage from Saint Petersburg, Russia, to London.
Dorcas	United Kingdom	The ship departed from Hartlepool, County Durham, for Hamburg. No further trace, presumed foundered in the North Sea with the loss of all hands.
Eagle	Hamburg	The paddle steamer sprang a leak and foundered in the North Sea off Ameland, Friesland, Netherlands. Her crew were rescued by a pilot boat. She was on a voyage from Great Yarmouth, Norfolk, to Hamburg.
Forth	United Kingdom	The sloop was driven ashore at Scotstown Head, Aberdeenshire. She was on a voyage from Sunderland, County Durham, to Sheerness, Kent.
Magdalene	United Kingdom	The sloop departed from Hull, Yorkshire, for Whitby, Yorkshire. No further trace, presumed foundered with the loss of all hands.

== 27 October ==
List of shipwrecks: 27 October 1838
Ship	State	Description
Confidence	United Kingdom	The ship was lost in Longsoundfjord. Her crew were rescued. She was on a voyage from London to Danzig.
Count Paleni	Kingdom of Sardinia	The ship sprang a leak and foundered 65 nautical miles (120 km) off Cape Spartivento, Sardinia. Her crew were rescued. She was on a voyage from Odesa to Genoa.
Darien	United States	The ship departed from Texel, North Holland, Netherlands, for Guayama, Puerto Rico and Baltimore, Maryland. No further trace, presumed foundered with the loss of all hands.
Flyrenskiold	Denmark	The ship was driven ashore at Thisted. Her crew were rescued. She was on a voyage from Altona to Skive.
Lady Montgomery	United Kingdom	The ship was driven ashore near Ramsey, Isle of Man. She was on a voyage from Whitehaven, Cumberland, to Newry, County Antrim. Lady Montgomery was later refloated and taken into Ramsey.
Little Kate	United Kingdom	The ship was driven ashore in Ramsey Bay. She was on a voyage from Chester, Cheshire, to Dublin. Little Kate was later refloated and taken into Ramsey in a waterlogged condition
Minerva	Sweden	The ship was driven ashore and wrecked in Åland, Denmark. She was on a voyage from Sundsvall to Rendsburg, Duchy of Schleswig.
Princess Augusta	United Kingdom	The ship was driven ashore at Southwold, Suffolk, where she broke up the next day. She was on a voyage from Saint Petersburg, Russia, to London.
Town of Ross	United Kingdom	The ship was driven ashore on "Cork Bog Island". She was later refloated.

== 28 October ==
List of shipwrecks: 28 October 1838
Ship	State	Description
Albion	(United Kingdom of Great Britain and Ireland) Guernsey	The barque ran aground on the Kentish Knock, in the North Sea off the coast of Kent and was abandoned. She was on a voyage from Hamburg to Guernsey.
Alston	United Kingdom	The ship ran aground on the Nore and was damaged. She was on a voyage from Sunderland, County Durham, to London. Alston was later refloated and resumed her voyage.
Betsey and Nancy	United Kingdom	The ship was driven ashore at Angle, Pembrokeshire. She was on a voyage from Newport, Monmouthshire, to Kinsale, County Cork.
Bideford	United Kingdom	The ship was driven ashore at Aberavon, Glamorgan. She was later refloated.
Coronation	United Kingdom	The ship sprang a leak and was abandoned off Flamborough Head, Yorkshire. She was on a voyage from Sunderland to London.
Dapper	United Kingdom	The ship was driven ashore at Hartlepool, County Durham. Her crew were rescued. She was on a voyage from Newcastle upon Tyne, Northumberland, to Whitby, Yorkshire.
Eaglet	United Kingdom	The ship was driven ashore at Redcar, Yorkshire. She was later refloated.
Emily	United Kingdom	The ship departed from Bridlington, Yorkshire, for London. No further trace, presumed foundered with the loss of all hands.
Fame	United Kingdom	The ship was driven ashore at Aberavon. She was later refloated.
Friends	United Kingdom	The brig was driven ashore, capsized and sank at Shoreham-by-Sea, Sussex. Her seven crew were rescued. She was on a voyage from Seaham, County Durham, to Shoreham-by-Sea.
Friendship	United Kingdom	The brig foundered in the North Sea off Scarborough, Yorkshire. Her crew were rescued by Gem (United Kingdom). Friendship was on a voyage from Seaham to London.
Grand Turk	United States	The ship was driven ashore at Broadstairs, Kent, England. She was on a voyage from Antwerp, Belgium, to New Orleans, Louisiana. Grand Turk was later refloated and taken into Broadstairs, then Ramsgate, Kent, where she arrived on 30 October.
Harmonie	France	The ship was driven ashore and severely damaged at Ilfracombe, Devon, England. She was on a voyage from Cette, Hérault to Havre de Grâce, Seine-Inférieure.
Ipswich	United Kingdom	The ship ran aground on the Doom Bar. She was refloated then next day and taken into Padstow, Cornwall.
John and Mary	United Kingdom	The brig was abandoned in the Atlantic Ocean with the loss of three of her ten crew. Survivors were rescued by Kingston (United Kingdom). John and Mary was on a voyage from Miramichi, New Brunswick, British North America, to London. She was subsequently taken into St. Ives, Cornwall, where she arrived on 14 December.
Lively	United Kingdom	The ship was wrecked at Hartland Point, Devon.
Mary Frances	United Kingdom	The ship was driven ashore at Campbeltown, Argyllshire. She was on a voyage from Ayr to Drogheda, County Louth.
Mountaineer	United Kingdom	The East Indiaman, a brig, was driven ashore at Crosby Point, Lancashire. She was on a voyage from British Honduras to Liverpool, Lancashire.
Nautilus	United Kingdom	The brig departed from Hartlepool for Shoreham-by-Sea, Sussex. No further trace, presumed foundered with the loss of all hands.
Primrose	United Kingdom	The ship was driven ashore at Aberavon.
Princess Augusta	United Kingdom	The barque was driven ashore and wrecked at Lowestoft, Suffolk. Her crew were rescued.
Rebecca	United Kingdom	The ship was driven ashore at Aberavon.
Sarah	United Kingdom	The ship was driven ashore and wrecked at Lynmouth, Devon. Her crew were rescued.
William and Jane	United Kingdom	The ship was driven ashore at Aberavon.

== 29 October ==
List of shipwrecks: 29 October 1838
Ship	State	Description
Beneficia	Bremen	The ship was driven ashore and wrecked at Harlingen, Friesland, Netherlands. Her crew were rescued. She was on a voyage from Bremen to Amsterdam, North Holland, Netherlands.
Ceres	United Kingdom	The ship was wrecked near Gothenburg, Sweden. She was on a voyage from London to Pillau, Prussia.
Clara Protheroe	United Kingdom	The ship departed from The Mumbles for Youghal, County Cork. No further trace, presumed foundered with the loss of all hands.
Gentile	United States	The schooner was lost on Margaree Island, in the Bay of St. Lawrence. Crew saved.
German	United Kingdom	The ship was wrecked near Gothenburg. She was on a voyage from London to Saint Petersburg, Russia.
Ferdinand	Rostock	The ship was wrecked near Gothenburg. She was on a voyage from London to Rostock.
Hendrika	Kingdom of Hanover	The ship was wrecked on "Broncum". Her crew were rescued. She was on a voyage from Newcastle upon Tyne, Northumberland, England, to Emden.
Hutchinson	United Kingdom	The ship was wrecked on the Gunfleet Sand, in the North Sea off the coast of Essex. Her crew were rescued.
Isabella Penman	United Kingdom	The ship ran aground on the Long Sand, in the North Sea off the coast of Essex and capsized with the loss of all but two of her crew. She was on a voyage from Sunderland, County Durham, to London.
Jacob Philip	Netherlands	The ship was driven ashore and wrecked at "Foto", Sweden. she was on a voyage from Dordrecht, South Holland, to Rostock.
John	United Kingdom	The ship was driven ashore at Sunderland. She was on a voyage from Newcastle upon Tyne, Northumberland, to London. John was later refloated.
John	United Kingdom	The ship was driven ashore and wrecked at Shoeburyness, Essex. Her crew were rescued.
Juno	United Kingdom	The schooner was driven ashore and wrecked on Spurn Point, Yorkshire. Her crew were rescued.
Juno	Rostock	The ship sank off Varberg, Sweden. Her crew were rescued. She was on a voyage from Newcastle upon Tyne to Rostock.
Lochiel	United Kingdom	The ship was driven ashore at Harwich, Essex.
Margaret	United Kingdom	The ship was driven ashore and wrecked at Maryport, Cumberland. She was on a voyage from the Water of Urr to Maryport.
Niagara	United Kingdom	The ship was abandoned in the North Sea. Her crew were rescued by Cumbria (United Kingdom). Niagara was on a voyage from Amsterdam, North Holland, Netherlands, to South Shields, County Durham.
Odin	(Russian Empire) Grand Duchy of Finland	The ship was driven ashore south of Helsingborg, Sweden. She was on a voyage from London to Pori. Odin was refloated on 2 November.
Philomele	Belgium	The ship was lost in the Sea of Azov. She was on a voyage from Taganrog, Russia, to Antwerp.
Samuel and Elizabeth	United Kingdom	The ship was driven ashore in Hell Bay.

== 30 October ==
List of shipwrecks: 30 October 1838
Ship	State	Description
Amicus	United Kingdom	The ship was abandoned in the North Sea off the mouth of the Humber. Her crew were rescued by Search (United Kingdom). Amicus was on a voyage from King's Lynn, Norfolk, to Leeds, Yorkshire.
Andrew	United States	The ship was driven ashore near Den Helder, North Holland, Netherlands, with the loss of three of her crew. She was on a voyage from New York to Texel, North Holland.
Chieftain	United Kingdom	The ship was driven ashore at Aldeburgh, Suffolk.
Clara	United Kingdom	The ship was abandoned whilst on a voyage from Sunderland, County Durham, to Rostock.
Claude	United Kingdom	The ship was driven ashore and damaged near "Wyburg". Her crew were rescued. She was on a voyage from Shoreham-by-Sea, Sussex, to Memel, Prussia. Claude was refloated in early July 1839 and towed into Gothenburg by the steamship Prindsess Wilhelmine ( Sweden).
Neptunus	Netherlands	The ship was driven ashore near Den Helder. She was later refloated.
Peter	Danzig	The ship ran aground off Wijk aan Zee, North Holland, Netherlands. She was on a voyage from Danzig to Nantes, Loire-Inférieure, France.
Thalia	United Kingdom	The brig foundered in the North Sea. Her crew were rescued. She was on a voyage from Sunderland to London.
Thetis	Netherlands	The ship was driven ashore near Den Helder. She was later refloated.
Vrow Meta	Flag unknown	The ship was wrecked on the "Reffhorns".

== 31 October ==
List of shipwrecks: 31 October 1838
Ship	State	Description
Anders	Netherlands	The ship was driven ashore at Den Helder, North Holland. She was on a voyage from New York, United States, to Amsterdam, North Holland. Anders was refloated on 6 November.
Carolinian	United States	The ship was driven ashore between Adra and Almería, Spain. She was on a voyage from New Orleans, Louisiana, to Cette, Hérault, France.
Dungarvine	United Kingdom	The sloop was driven ashore on the coast of Inverness-shire. She was later refloated.
Friends	United Kingdom	The sloop was driven ashore on the coast of Inverness-shire. She was later refloated.
Gipsy	(United Kingdom of Great Britain and Ireland) British North America	The ship was wrecked near Hawk Inlet, Cape Sable Island, Nova Scotia. She was on a voyage from the Clyde to Saint John, New Brunswick.
Juno	United Kingdom	The ship ran aground on the Trinity Sand, in the North Sea and consequently foundered in the North Channel.
Mauney	United Kingdom	The ship was driven ashore in the Dardanelles. She was on a voyage from Odesa to London. Mauney was refloated on 7 November and resumed her voyage.
Portsmouth	United States	The schooner ran aground off Hog Island, Virginia and was wrecked. All on board survived. she was on a voyage from New York to Norfolk, Virginia.

== Unknown date ==
List of shipwrecks: Unknown date in October 1838
Ship	State	Description
Active	United Kingdom	The ship was driven ashore near Stromness, Orkney Islands. She was on a voyage from Newcastle upon Tyne, Northumberland, to "Castle-hill". Active was refloated on 26 October and taken into Stromness.
Albertus	Flag unknown	The ship foundered off the coast of Belgium.
Amphitrite	United Kingdom	The ship caught fire and was beached near Gothenburg, Sweden. She was on a voyage from Newcastle upon Tyne, Northumberland, to Gothenburg. Amphitrite was later refloated.
André	Belgium	The ship was driven ashore and wrecked near Ostend, West Flanders. She was on a voyage from Liverpool, Lancashire, England, to Ostend.
Anne Grant	United Kingdom	The full-rigged ship was wrecked on Inniskal Island, in Boyghla Bay, County Donegal, before 27 October. She was on a voyage from Quebec, Lower Canada, British North America, to Greenock, Renfrewshire.
Brutus	Texas Navy	The 10-gun schooner was wrecked in a storm.
Columbia	United Kingdom	The ship was wrecked in the Black Sea before 23 October.
Cruiser	United Kingdom	The ship was lost at Kerch, Russia.
Dart	United Kingdom	The smack struck a submerged rock off Sark, Channel Islands, and sank with the loss of two of her four crew. She was on a voyage from Brixham, Devon, to Jersey, Channel Islands.
Deveron	United Kingdom	The ship was driven ashore on Prince Edward Island, British North America. She was later refloated and taken into Pictou, Nova Scotia, where she was condemned.
Drie Gebroeders	Netherlands	The ship departed from Amsterdam, North Holland, for Lübeck in early October. No further trace, presumed foundered with the loss of all hands.
Earl of Dalhousie	United Kingdom	The ship was wrecked on Hogland, Russia. Her crew were rescued. She was on a voyage from Saint Petersburg, Russia, to Newcastle upon Tyne, Northumberland.
Eliza	United Kingdom	The ship was lost near Cape Ray, Newfoundland, British North America. She was on a voyage from Newfoundland to Cape Breton Island, Nova Scotia, British North America.
Elizabeth	United Kingdom	The sloop was abandoned in the North Sea before 12 October. She was taken into Leith, Lothian, on that date.
Enterprise	United Kingdom	The ship was abandoned in the English Channel and foundered off Lydd, Kent.
Eucharis	Sweden	The ship struck the pier at Klepp, Norway, and sank. She was on a voyage from Gothenburg to London, England. Eucharis was refloated on 31 October.
Five Brodre	Flag unknown	The ship was wrecked on the Kentish Knock. Her crew were rescued.
Frau Marie	(Denmark) Duchy of Schleswig	The ship departed from an English port for the Eider in early October. No further trace, presumed foundered with the loss of all hands.
Frithiof	Norway	The ship was driven ashore on the coast of Norway. She was on a voyage from Halmstad to the Charente.
Henriette von Wolgast	Prussia	The sloop foundered in the Baltic Sea off "Devenon", Prussia.
James Colvin	United Kingdom	The whaler was destroyed by fire. The ship's cook, who accidentally started the fire, committed suicide.
Jupiter	United Kingdom	The brig was driven ashore near Whitby, Yorkshire. Her crew were rescued by the Whitby Lifeboat.
La Solomon	France	The sloop was wrecked at Newton-by-the-Sea, Northumberland.
Ladour II	United Kingdom	The ship was wrecked near Marstrand, Sweden. Her crew were rescued. She was on a voyage from Saint Petersburg, Russia, to Bordeaux, Gironde.
Lerwick	United Kingdom	The schooner was driven ashore at Lerwick, Shetland Islands.
Little Mary	United Kingdom	The ship was driven ashore and wrecked at Runswick Bay, Yorkshire. Her crew were rescued. She was on a voyage from South Shields, County Durham, to Great Yarmouth, Norfolk.
Lord Byron	United Kingdom	The ship was driven ashore on the Mull of Galloway, Ayrshire. She was on a voyage from Glasson Dock, Lancashire, to Troon, Ayrshire. Lord Byron was refloated on 10 November and taken into Drogheda, County Louth.
Mercator	United Kingdom	The ship was abandoned in the Baltic Sea. She was on a voyage from Sunderland, County Durham, to Pillau, Prussia. Mercator was later taken into Pillau, arriving on 28 October.
Mountaineer	United Kingdom	The ship was driven ashore and scuttled at Crosby Point, Lancashire.
Nancy	United Kingdom	The ship was wrecked near Berwick upon Tweed, Northumberland. She was on a voyage from Newcastle upon Tyne to Dundee, Forfarshire.
North Briton	(United Kingdom of Great Britain and Ireland) British North America	The full-rigged ship was driven ashore on the coast of New Brunswick. She was on a voyage from Miramichi, New Brunswick, to Liverpool.
Perseverance	United Kingdom	The ship was abandoned in the North Sea.
Principe Paskewitz	Russia	The ship was wrecked on the coast of Sicily. She was on a voyage from Odesa to Antwerp, Belgium.
Rembrandt	Belgium	The schooner was lost with all hands between Caffa and Kertch, Russia.
Sarah	United Kingdom	The sloop sprang a leak and was abandoned in the North Sea. She was on a voyage from Sunderland, County Durham, to Leith. Sarah was subsequently towed into the River Humber by the brig Friends (United Kingdom).
Savatoff Nicolay	Russia	The ship was wrecked on "Wrangel Island". She was on a voyage from Saint Petersburg to Reval.
Savatoff Nieulay	Russia	The ship was wrecked on "Wrangel Island". She was on a voyage from Saint Petersburg to Reval.
Scotia	United Kingdom	The ship was wrecked at the mouth of the River Tees.
Titus	France	The brig was wrecked at Burghsluis, Zeeland, Netherlands, before 7 October. She was on a voyage from Adra, Spain, to Rotterdam, South Holland, Netherlands.
Traveller	United Kingdom	The brig was driven ashore at Richibucto, New Brunswick Between 15 and 22 October. She was on a voyage from Limerick to Miramichi. Traveller had been refloated by 26 October and taken into Ricibucto.
Walter Hamilton	United Kingdom	The ship was driven ashore in the Sound of Hoy. She was later refloated and taken into Stromness.
