= Peter Howard =

Peter Howard may refer to:

- Peter Howard (politician) (1772–1843), Canadian businessman and politician
- Peter Howard (journalist) (1908–1965), British journalist and leader of Moral Re-Armament
- Peter Howard (conductor) (1927–2008), Broadway conductor and dance music arranger
- Peter Howard (RAF officer) (1925–2007)
- Peter Howard (Medal of Honor) (1829–1875), American Civil War sailor and Medal of Honor recipient
- Pete Howard, drummer of The Clash
- Peter Howard, pseudonym for the American screenwriter Howard Koch
