= Charles Haynes Haswell =

American naval engineer, politician, and historian

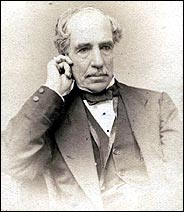
- Charles Haynes Haswell

New York City Common Council Representative of the 21st Ward
- In office 1855–1859

First Engineer-in-Chief of the United States Navy
- In office October 1844 – c. 1850

Personal details
- Born: May 22, 1809 New York City, New York, USA
- Died: May 12, 1907 (aged 97) New York City, New York, USA
- Party: Democratic Party
- Spouse: Ann Elizabeth Burns
- Children: 6+
- Military career
- Allegiance: United States of America
- Branch: United States Navy
- Service years: 1836 - 1850s
- Rank: Engineer-in-Chief
- Conflicts: American Civil War

Charles Haynes Haswell (May 22, 1809 – May 12, 1907) was a naval engineer, New York City politician and historian. A native resident of New York City, Haswell was author of one of the most broadly circulated engineering manuals of the 19th century, and also published a collection of remembrances of the city drawn from his private journals. He was the first Engineer-in-Chief of the United States Navy.

== Early life ==
Charles Haynes Haswell was born May 22, 1809, on North Moore Street, New York City, the son of a Dublin-born member of the British foreign service, Charles Haswell, and his wife Dorothea Haynes of a Barbados planter family, her brother Gen. Robert Haynes having been Speaker of the House of Assembly there for over three decades. He attended school at Jamaica Academy on Long Island and received tutelage in the classics in New York City. At the age of 19, he entered James P. Allaire’s engine works, which represented one of the top marine engineering firms of the time. There Haswell rose to become chief draftsman and designer. By 1836, he was working for the West Point Foundry, and the next year saw his production of the first steam launch or yacht, the Sweetheart.

== Naval career ==
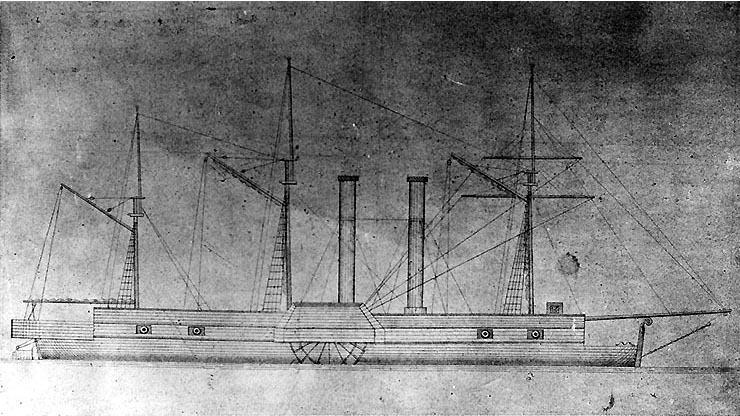
USS Fulton, the first U.S. Navy steam vessel for which Haswell served as engineer

At this time the United States Navy committed to the construction of several steam vessels, and Haswell, who had watched their earlier experimental steam vessels in New York Harbor, applied to supervise the engineering of USS Fulton, under construction. Although at first his role was only quasi-unofficial, there being no rank structure for engineers in the Navy at the time, when he was finally officially nominated and confirmed in 1851 to the rank of chief engineer, the appointment was to date from the start of his service in July 1836. Thus began a Naval career during which he would supervise the design of engines for ten warships. In 1839, he served on a naval board responsible for the construction of the steam frigates Missouri and Mississippi, for which he was relieved of his duties to the Fulton. After work on the Michigan, he became chief engineer on the Missouri, but a dispute over a plan to replace its one smokestack with two earned him a two-year suspension, during which time he was involved in the construction of the boilers for the Allegheny and several revenue cutters.

He was also instrumental in the Navy's creation of a corps of engineers, and he was named the first engineer-in-chief in October 1844. He subsequently designed the engines of Powhatan and San Jacinto. A public dispute over the design of the latter led to his removal as Engineer-in-Chief, and he was instead made chief engineer of the San Jacinto, having had responsibility for the design of its propulsion system, advocating his preferred propeller over a sidewheel, but being overruled. One of his innovations while with the navy was the use of zinc lining to the boilers to reduce corrosion.

As chief engineer, he is credited with establishing the qualifications for the engineering corps of the Navy. However, by 1850, his health declined and he was declared unfit for duty, yet word failed to reach the Navy and he was ordered to sea with San Jacinto. His ill health continued, and he left the ship in mid-cruise, going ashore in Spain to recover, and then to New York. Still unaware of his true medical state, the Navy considered him to have abandoned his post and removed him from the service in May 1852.

He would briefly return to naval service during the American Civil War, when he served as chief engineer for the Burnside Expedition, and there briefly commanded a small steamer that pulled off the shoaled gunboat Ranger from under the guns of Fort Bartow during the shelling of Roanoke Island.

== Private sector ==
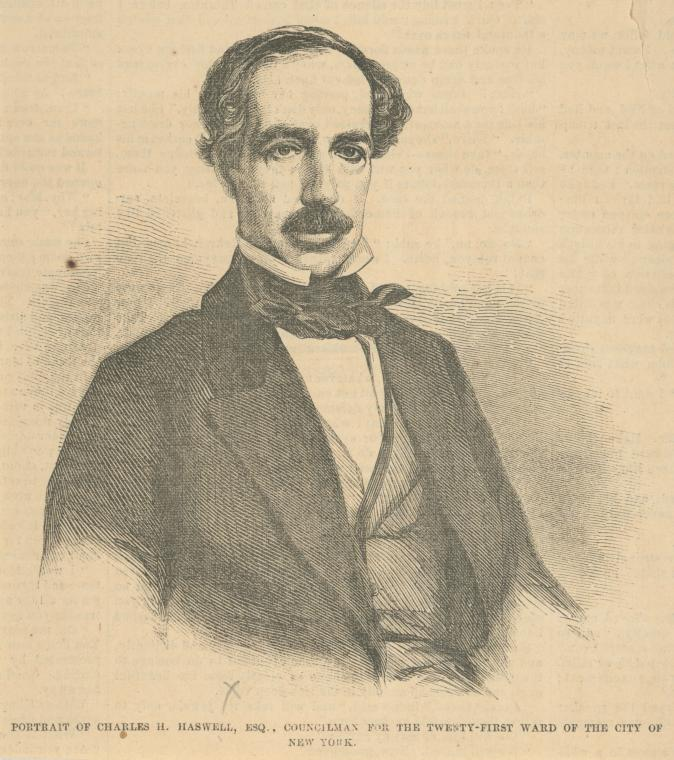
Charles Haynes Haswell in the late 1850s as representative to the New York City Common Council

Following his separation from the Navy in the early 1850s, Haswell returned to New York, where he started work in the private sector, designing numerous commercial ships. He served as a consulting engineer for the Board of Health, the Quarantine Commission, the Board of Estimate and Apportionment, and for the Board of Public Improvements, being much sought on questions of the suitability of the uncertain geological structure underlying New York City for establishing firm foundations for the city's growing skyscrapers.

Following the city's purchase of Rikers Island, he directed improvements including grading and trimming of the island, personally supervising the work when in his nineties, and also made improvements to Hart Island and Hoffman Island. He applied his marine engineering experience as Surveyor of Steamships for Marine Underwriters of New York, a role he occupied for four decades, performing similar work for Boston and Philadelphia firms, and for Lloyd's. He was sent a $1500 diamond ring by the Emperor of Russia for supplying drafts of his design of the engines of the Powhatan. He was also a yachting enthusiast, serving as chairman of the regatta committee and chief measurer for the New York Yacht Club. He was a member of numerous engineering societies, including the American Society of Civil Engineers, and he was also member of the Union Club. In religion, he was a regularly attending member of the Dutch Reformed Church.

== Politics ==
From the time of his return to New York following his Naval service, Haswell also became active in politics. In 1855 he was elected to the New York City Common Council, representing the city's 21st Ward, and in his final year, 1859, he served as president of the council. He served as chairman of a politically stacked grand jury impaneled to investigate voter fraud in the election of 1868. Like most of the members of this body, he was deeply associated with the Tammany Hall political machine, of which he served as leader or Grand Sachem from 1876 to 1882. He would serve as a trustee of the New York and Brooklyn Bridge, and as president of the New York Board of Corrections. A lifelong Democrat, at the time of his death he was the oldest living member of the Tammany organization.

== Author ==
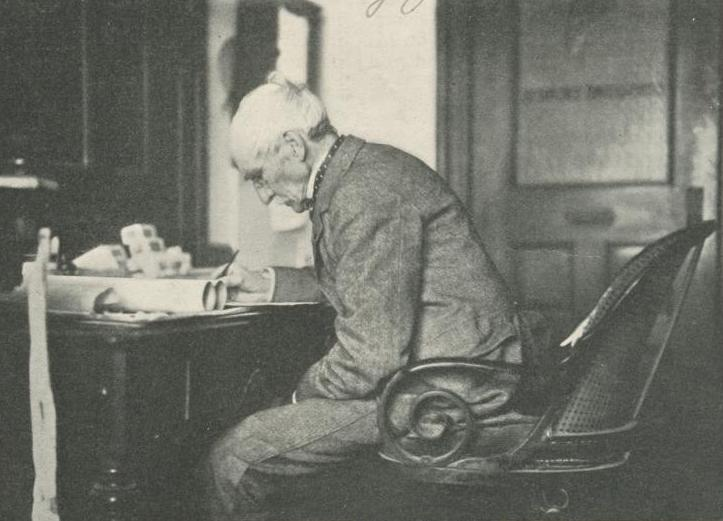
Charles Haynes Haswell in his last years, at work at his desk

Haswell also had a career as a published author. His most popular work was The Engineer's and Mechanic's Pocket Book, which was first published in 1843, and by 1907 had gone through 72 editions. It has been described as "Engineering 101 meets Ripley's Believe It or Not." Other professional works included: Mechanic's Tables (1856), Mensuration and Practical Geometry (1858), Book-keeping (1871), and an unpublished History of the Steam Boiler and its Appendanges (1887). He is also well known as a chronicler of everyday life in New York City. From the age of 9, he kept a private journal which would serve as the primary source for his Reminiscences of the City of New York by an Octogenarian (1816–1860), published in 1896. This somewhat eclectic work proves a unique source for the everyday details of life in New York City for the first half of the century.

== Honors ==
In 1905, the American Society of Mechanical Engineers elected him an honorary member, in recognition of his engineering work in the Navy and for his Engineers' and Mechanics' Pocket-Book.

== Family and death ==
In 1829, Haswell married Ann Elizabeth Burns, and had six children who survived to adulthood, Sarah Haynes, Edmund Haynes, Frances Roe, Gouverneur Kemble, Charles Haynes and Lillie Bulwer Haswell. Days short of his 98th birthday, Haswell suffered a fall in the dining room of his home. Dislocating his shoulder, he never recovered from the shock and died the next day, May 12, 1907.

His son, Gouverneur Kemble Haswell, attended the U.S. Naval Academy and rose to the rank of Lieutenant Commander in the Navy before retiring in 1876. He was briefly reactivated during the Spanish–American War and was promoted in retirement to Commander.
