= HMS Valiant (1807) =

Ship of the line of the Royal Navy

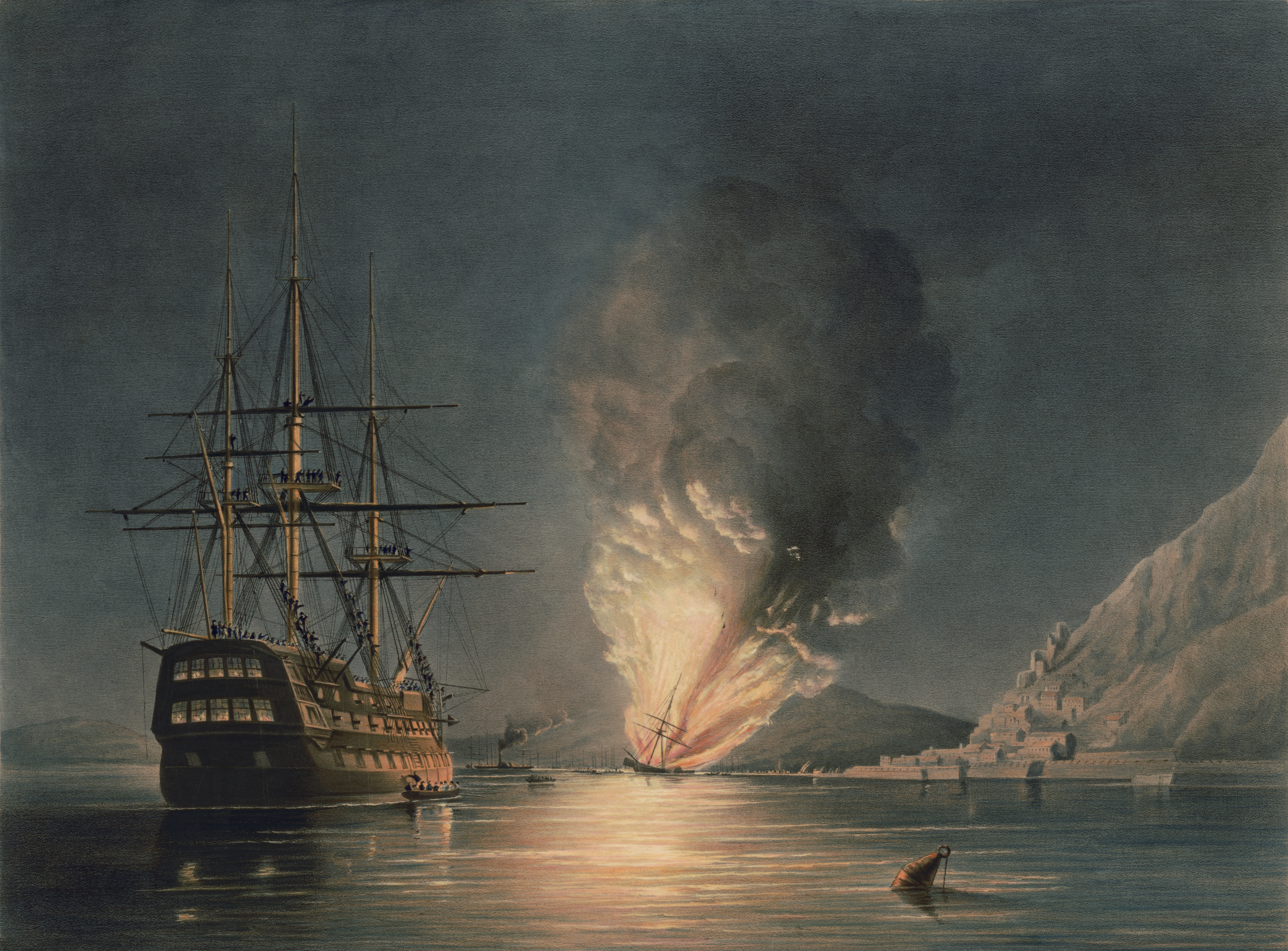
- HMS Malabar (left), a sister ship of Valiant

History

United Kingdom
- Name: Valiant
- Ordered: 24 January 1805
- Builder: Perry, Wells & Green, Blackwall Yard
- Laid down: April 1805
- Launched: 24 January 1807
- Commissioned: March 1807
- Decommissioned: August–September 1815
- Fate: Broken up, 1823

General characteristics
- Class & type: Repulse-class ship of the line
- Tons burthen: 1,718 31/94 (bm)
- Length: 174 ft (53 m) (gundeck)
- Beam: 47 ft 4 in (14.4 m)
- Draught: 17 ft 4 in (5.3 m) (light)
- Depth of hold: 20 ft (6.1 m)
- Sail plan: Full-rigged ship
- Complement: 590
- Armament: 74 muzzle-loading, smoothbore guns; Gundeck: 28 × 32 pdr guns; Upper deck: 28 × 18 pdr guns; Quarterdeck: 2 × 18 pdr guns + 12 × 32 pdr carronades; Forecastle: 2 × 18 pdr guns + 2 × 32 pdr carronades; Poop deck: 6 × 18 pdr carronades

HMS Valiant was a 74-gun third-rate Repulse-class ship of the line built for the Royal Navy in the first decade of the 19th century. Completed in 1807, she played a minor role in the Napoleonic Wars.

== Description ==
Valiant measured 174 feet (53 m) on the gundeck and 142 feet 10 inches (43.5 m) on the keel. She had a beam of 47 feet 8 inches (14.5 m), a depth of hold of 20 feet (6.1 m) and had a tonnage of 1,718 31/94 tons burthen. The ship's draught was 13 feet 3 inches (4.0 m) forward and 17 feet 4 inches (5.3 m) aft at light load; fully loaded, her draught would be significantly deeper. The Repulse-class ships were armed with 74 muzzle-loading, smoothbore guns that consisted of twenty-eight 32-pounder guns on her lower gundeck and twenty-eight 18-pounder guns on her upper gundeck. Their forecastle mounted a pair of 18-pounder guns and two 32-pounder carronades. On their quarterdeck they carried two 18-pounders and a dozen 32-pounder carronades. Above the quarterdeck was their poop deck with half-a-dozen 18-pounder carronades. Their crew numbered 590 officers and ratings. The ships were fitted with three masts and ship-rigged.

== Construction and career ==
Valiant was the second ship of her name to serve in the Royal Navy. She was ordered on 24 January 1805 from Perry, Wells & Green as part of the second batch of five Repulse-class ships of the line designed by Sir William Rule, co-Surveyor of the Navy. The ship was laid down at their shipyard in Blackwall Yard in April and was launched on 24 January 1807. She was commissioned by Captain Kenneth McKenzie in March and completed at Woolwich Dockyard on 6 March.

She took part in the attack on Copenhagen in 1807 and in the action against French warships in the Basque Roads from 11 to 25 April 1809 (Battle of Aix Roads) under Lord Gambier and Lord Cochrane.

On 17 June 1813, Valiant was in company with Acasta when they came upon HMS Wasp in pursuit of an American brig off Cape Sable. The three British ships continued the chase for another 100 miles (160 km) before they finally were able to capture the brig. She was the privateer Porcupine, of more than 300 tons, and was carrying a valuable cargo of brandy, wine, silks, dry goods and other merchandise from Bayonne to Boston. Captain Robert Dudley Oliver of Valiant described Porcupine as being only eight months old and an uncommonly fast sailer. After the capture, Wasp, which had recaptured a prize that the privateer Young Teazer had taken, sailed in search of the privateer.

She was broken up in 1823.
