= USS Missouri (1841) =

10-gun side-wheel frigate of the US Navy

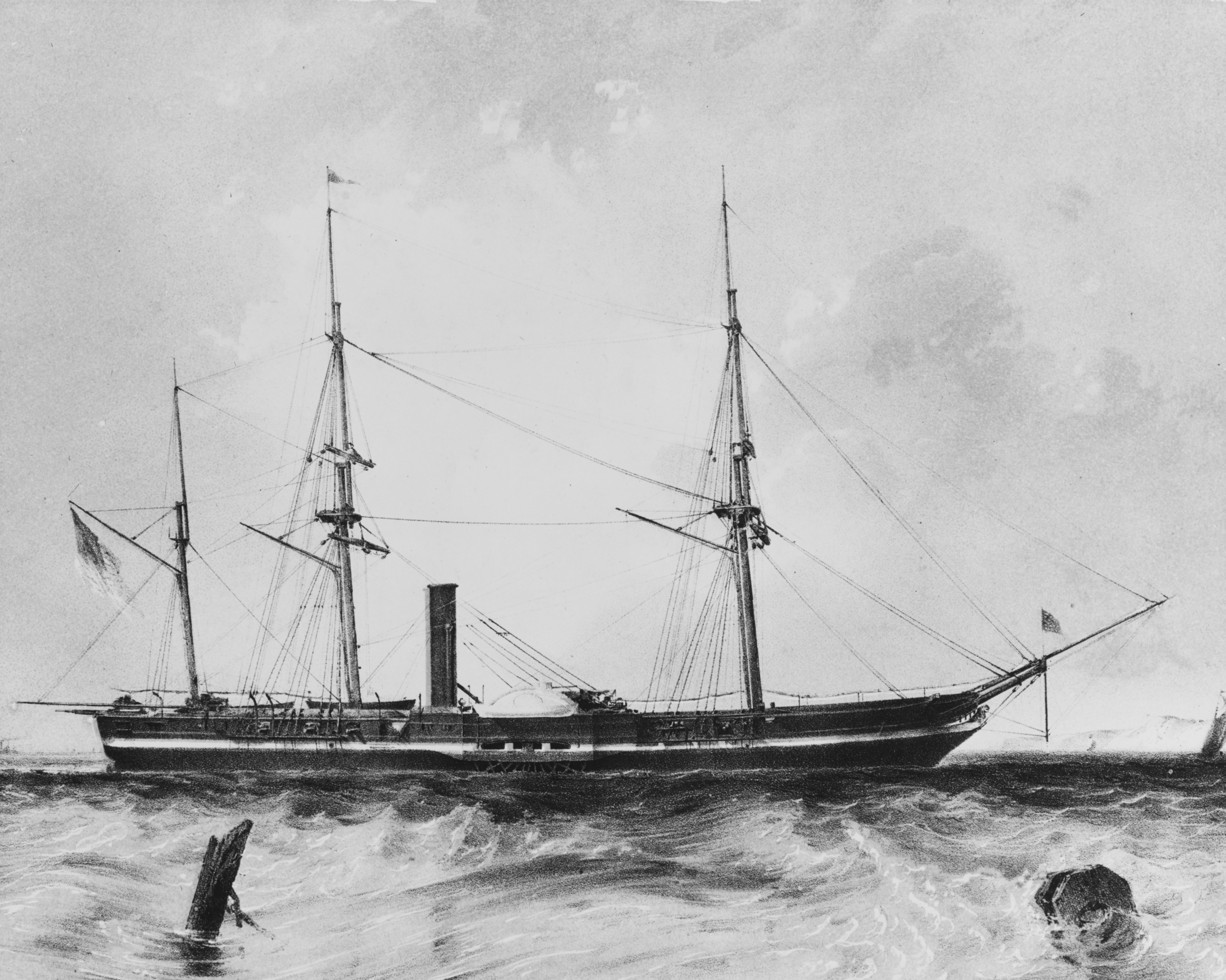
- Side view of Missouri's sister ship Mississippi before 1853.

History

United States
- Name: Missouri
- Namesake: Missouri River
- Ordered: 1839
- Builder: New York Navy Yard
- Cost: $568,806
- Laid down: 1840
- Launched: 7 January 1841
- Commissioned: 1842
- Fate: Destroyed by fire, 25–26 August 1843

General characteristics
- Type: Sidewheel steam frigate
- Displacement: 3,220 long tons (3,272 t)
- Length: loa: 229 ft (70 m); lbp: 220 ft (67 m)
- Beam: 40 ft (12 m)
- Draft: Mean: 19 feet (5.8 m); Deep: 20 ft (6.1 m)
- Installed power: 517 ihp (386 kW)
- Propulsion: 4 boilers; 2 engines; 2 paddle wheels
- Sail plan: Barque rig; 3 masts; 19,000 square feet (1,800 m^{2}) of sail
- Speed: Cruising: 8 knots (15 km/h; 9.2 mph); Top: 14 knots (26 km/h; 16 mph)
- Range: 20 days of coal
- Complement: Design: 226; At destruction: 384
- Armament: 2 × 10 in (25 cm) guns; 8 × 8 in (20 cm) guns

USS Missouri (Note: "USS" stands for "United States Ship".) was a sidewheel steam frigate of the United States Navy. Alongside USS Mississippi, she was one of the first steam warships of the Navy. She was ordered by Congress in an attempt to force the fleet to modernize and embrace steam engines. Commissioned in 1842, she carried 10 guns, was among the fleet's largest ships and featured barque-rigged sails. Her introduction helped legitimize the role of engineers in the fleet; she was later involved in a scandal that ousted the first engineer-in-chief of the US Navy.

In her first year, she made trial runs along the US East Coast to demonstrate her engines, followed by a deployment to the Gulf of Mexico. In 1843, she made the US Navy's first steam-powered Atlantic crossing, bound for Egypt. While anchored off Gibraltar, spilled turpentine ignited and the resulting fire spread across the ship overnight. An international team attempted to fight the fire, but her captain judged the effort futile and ordered the ship to be abandoned. After the crew evacuated, the ship was destroyed the next morning when her magazine detonated.

== Development and design ==
By the 1830s, the steam engine began to eclipse sails as the primary propulsion of warships. The US Navy failed to initially embrace the new technology, as conservative senior officers opposed a radical change to the status quo. An additional opponent to steam power was James Paulding, the Secretary of the Navy, who vowed to never "see our grand old ships supplanted by these new and ugly sea-monsters" in reference to steam-powered warships. The Board of Navy Commissioners–an advisory group that executed naval policy–likewise opposed change, and the Navy technologically stalled. By 1839, both the French and Royal navies had at least 15 steam warships in service, far outpacing the Americans. The only steam vessels operated by the Navy that year were the tugboat Engineer and the floating artillery battery Fulton. The technological gap with the European powers led to a public demand for naval modernization. In response, Congress ordered the construction of three "sea steamers" for the Navy that year.

To fulfill the order from Congress, the Navy assembled two boards to develop the new ships. The first group was composed of commodores who outlined the capabilities they would like in the vessels. The second board was made up of engineers and constructors who analyzed the officers' request and developed specific instructions required to build the vessels.

The resulting specifications stated that the new vessels would be dual-powered ocean-going steamships equipped with 10 guns, provisions to supply a crew of 200 for 2 months, and enough coal to power an engine that could develop 9 knots (17 km/h; 10 mph) for 20 days. In addition, the ships also had to have sails to allow them to operate without engine power. The final design was by Joshua Humphreys, Samuel Hartt, and John Lenthall, and featured an overall length of 229 feet (70 m), a beam of 40 feet (12 m), mean draft of 19 feet (5.8 m), a mean draft displacement of 3,220 long tons (3,272 t), and a barque rig with 19,000 square feet (1,800 m^{2}) of sail. After the two boards met, they agreed to only build two steamships, down from the three initially ordered from Congress.

Due to the position of the engine and funnel, the three masts were located in unconventional locations on the main deck. Combined with the funnel preventing the use of mainsails, the design was slow while under sail. The ships were the longest in the Navy, even in comparison to the 120-gun USS Pennsylvania. To prevent hogging (longitudinal bending), the ships were the first American vessels fitted with iron straps to strengthen the hull. The straps were diagonal to the keel and ran to the main deck. The large size was required to have enough space for the engines, coal stores, and provisions while retaining an economical ratio between each dimension.

Armament consisted of four Paixhans 8-inch (20 cm) guns on each broadside that fired 68-pound (31 kg) shells and two bow-mounted Paixhans 10-inch (25 cm) guns that shot 120-pound (54 kg) rounds. The two bow guns were mounted on pivots and had a 146° arc of fire; all ten guns were kept on the main deck. The hulls were made of live oak grown in and around the Atakapa District. Below the gun deck was the berth deck, which housed berthing for the seamen. In the stern were the officers' quarters. Forward of the officers' quarters was the engine, located amidships, which was flanked by a 93-foot (28 m) long coal bunker on either side. The two bunkers could carry 800 tons of coal for 20 days of steaming. In front of the engines were the enlisted quarters which ran to the bow. Below the berth deck was the tween deck, itself above the hold. The hold was subdivided into five compartments by four watertight bulkheads. While otherwise similar, Missouri's interior was better furnished compared to that of her sister ship USS Mississippi. The final design had space to store enough provisions to support a complement of 226 sailors and officers for four months.

The main difference between the ships was the engines, as the Navy wanted to investigate different designs. Missouri was fitted with inclined engines, which were popular with American paddle steamers. Mississippi received side-lever engines, commonly used by trans-Atlantic steamships and the Royal Navy. Missouri was equipped with four double-return copper boilers that provided steam to two inclined direct-acting engines with a 10-foot (3.0 m) stroke and a 62-inch (160 cm) bore. The engines turned two 28-foot (8.5 m) tall, 11-foot (3.4 m) wide paddle wheels that developed 517 indicated horsepower (386 kilowatts) and an average speed of 7–10 knots (13–19 km/h; 8.1–11.5 mph). There were 21 paddles on each wheel; every paddle had a length of 6 feet (1.8 m) and a width of 3 feet (0.91 m).

== Service history ==
=== In the Americas ===
Missouri's engines were designed by Charles Copeland, the principal engineer of the US Navy. They were built at the West Point Foundry at Cold Spring, New York. Construction of the ship was awarded to Samuel Hartt at his shipyard, while Mississippi's construction went to John Lenthall in Philadelphia. Missouri was laid down at the New York Navy Yard in Brooklyn, New York, sometime in 1840 and launched on 7 January 1841 at a cost of US$568,806 (equivalent to $17,262,300 in 2025). In early 1842, she was completed, commissioned, and named after the Missouri River. Mississippi was launched in December 1841 and completed in early 1842.

The frigate left New York in March 1842 and sailed to Washington, D.C., during a trial run along with Mississippi, although the voyage was interrupted when the Missouri ran aground off Port Tobacco, Maryland, on 1 April. During the trials, Copeland stated that Missouri reached a top speed of 14 knots (26 km/h; 16 mph), although she cruised at a speed of 8 knots (15 km/h; 9.2 mph) for longer voyages. She was eventually freed and reached her destination on the 13th, and proceeded to undergo further trial runs to demonstrate the power of steam propulsion in rivers to members of the government. By the end of the summer, she deployed to the Gulf of Mexico and did not return to Washington, D.C. until the next April. She was assigned to the Home Squadron, which elicited complaints about her high cost to coal and operate.

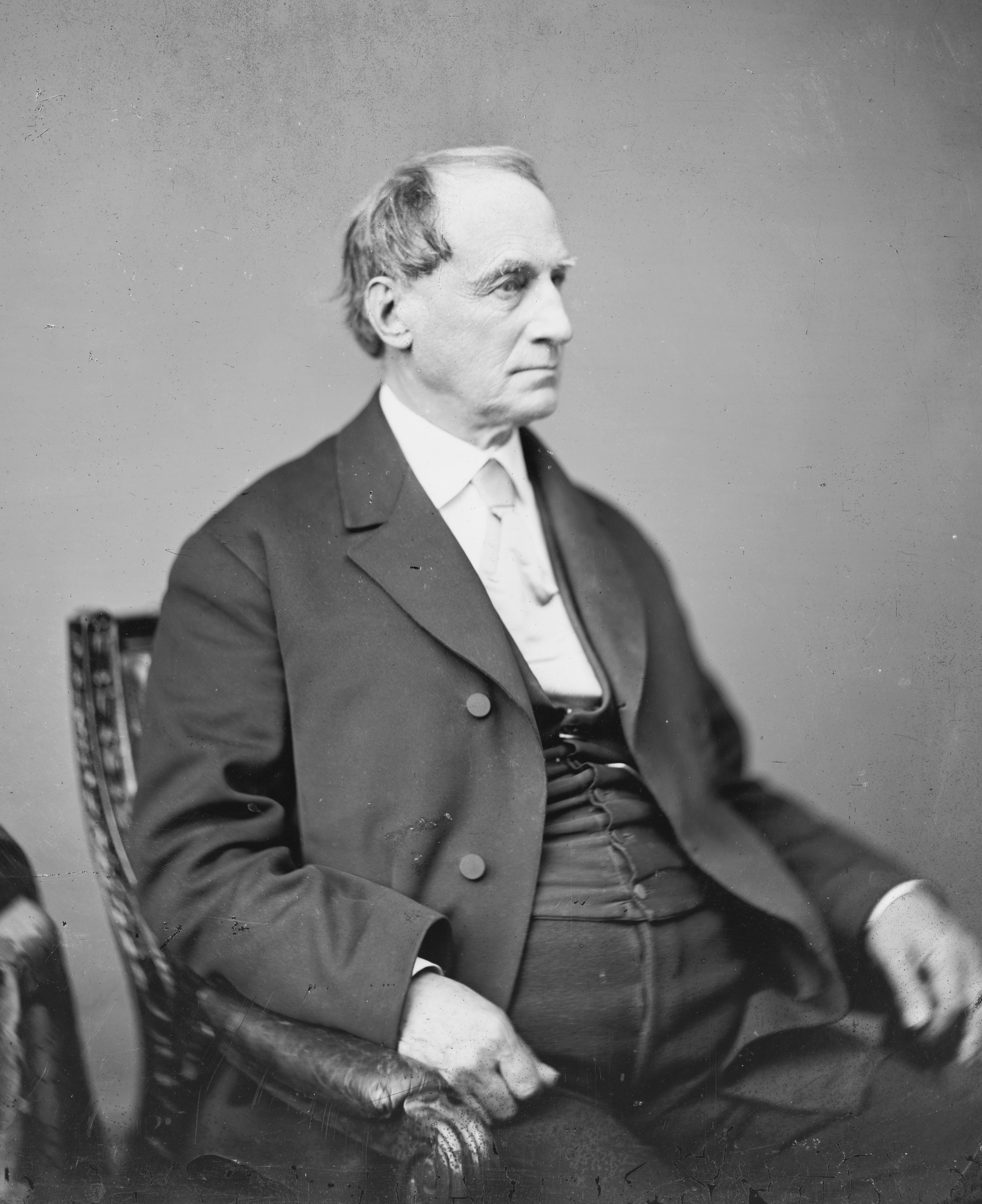
Caleb Cushing; his voyage to China was the motive for Missouri to sail to the Mediterranean.

By 1842, the introduction of Missouri and Mississippi required the Navy to hire engineers to service the new ships. The engineers were paid less than their civilian counterparts and held ambiguous positions with unclear job security and terms of employment. Unsatisfied with their conditions, and with the help of lawyer and politician Gilbert L. Thompson, they pressured Congress to establish the Engineer Corps and engineer-specific ranks. Thompson, the son of previous Secretary of the Navy Smith Thompson, was appointed as the first engineer-in-chief of the US Navy. The decision was criticized by some engineers, who believed the assignment was due to nepotism as Thompson lacked a professional background in engineering. When Missouri docked in Washington, D.C. in 1843, he ordered her 7-foot (2.1 m) wide funnel to be removed and replaced with two funnels half the size connected to the two paddlewheel houses. He believed that the turning of the paddlewheels would induce a draft down the funnels and into the engine rooms, even though the idea was rejected by Charles Haswell, chief engineer of Missouri and one of the most senior engineers in the Navy. Thompson was confident in his idea and invited members of the presidential cabinet to witness a test run of Missouri with her new funnels. The trial run was a dismal failure, and Thompson successfully blamed Haswell for the poor performance. However, the event ruined Thompson's reputation with the Navy, and in the resulting political fallout, he was ousted and replaced by Haswell by the next year. The organizational changes within the Navy were part of a larger restructuring, as Congress believed that the Board of Navy Commissioners' reluctance to support innovation was detrimental and ordered it to be dissolved. An article from the United States Naval Institute later described Thompson's arrangement as, "one of the strangest systems of forced draft and smoke elimination that has ever been recorded".

The ship underwent an overhaul for most of mid-1843, which included reinstating the original funnel design. On 5 August 1843, work was complete and she left Norfolk, Virginia. Her next assignment was to transport Caleb Cushing, the US Minister to China, to Alexandria, Egypt, as the first part of his trip to China. Cushing was ordered to negotiate a trade treaty with the Daoguang Emperor. Before departing, Missouri was visited by President John Tyler on 6 August, who spent several hours on board as the ship cruised in Hampton Roads. She then sailed for Fayal Island in the Azores and arrived 12 days later, where she coaled before proceeding.

=== Destruction ===
On the afternoon of 25 August 1843, Missouri anchored in Gibraltar Harbor. British sailors applauded Missouri when she arrived in Gibraltar, as the voyage was the first powered crossing of the Atlantic by an American warship. She maintained an average speed of 8.02 knots (14.85 km/h; 9.23 mph) and consumed 1.4 tons of coal an hour. Captain John T. Newton and Cushing went ashore to meet the US Consul to Gibraltar, along with the Governor of Gibraltar, Sir Robert Wilson. The men planned to stay ashore for most of the day as Missouri loaded coal and performed routine maintenance.

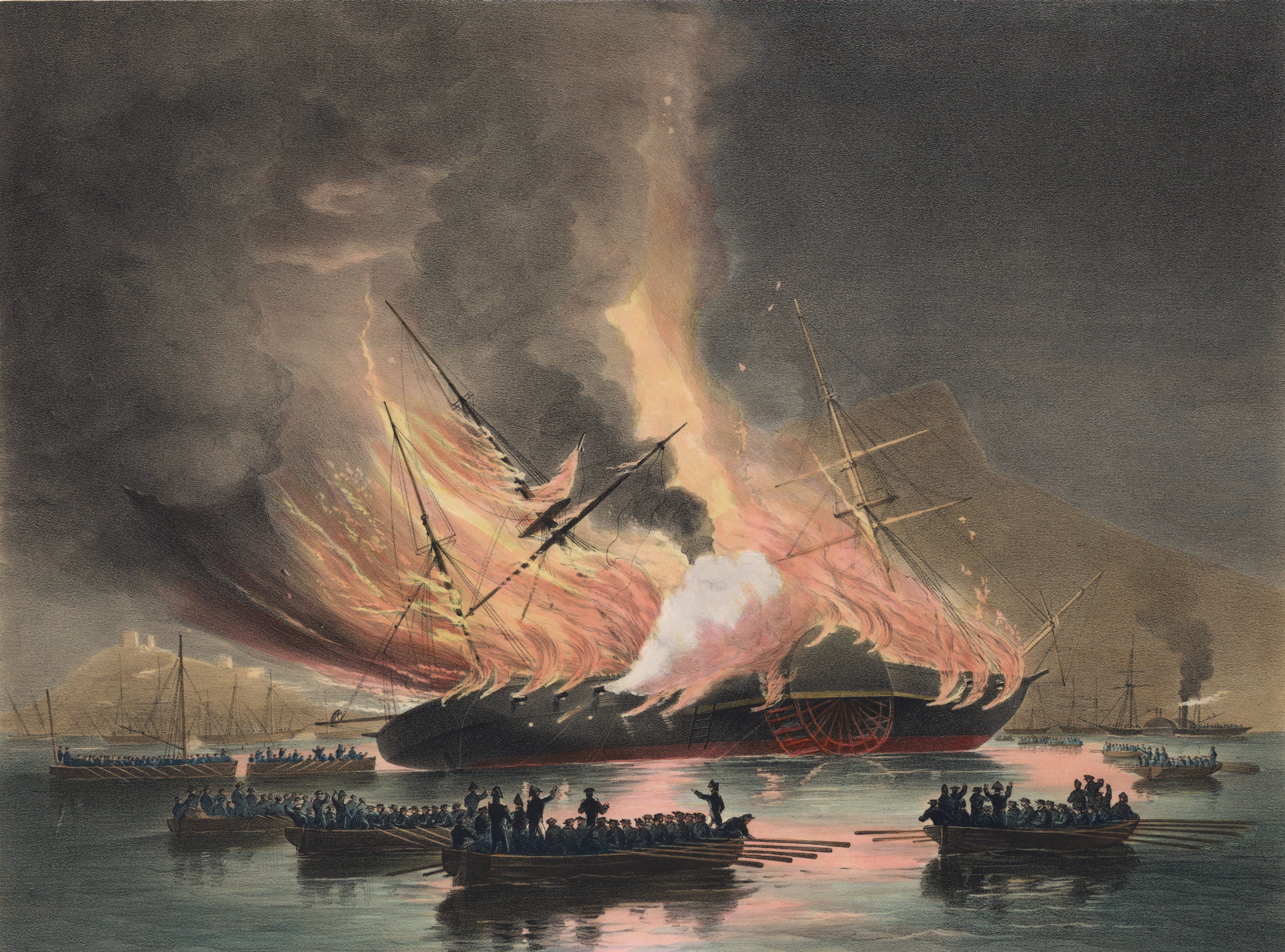
The Accidental Burning of the USS Missouri in Gibraltar by Edward Duncan, based on an eyewitness sketch by George Mends.

At 7:50 pm, coal heaver John Sutton was in the starboard engineering storeroom looking for a pair of weighing scales. When he grabbed the item from a shelf, he accidentally knocked down a wrench that shattered a demijohn full of turpentine. The men one deck below chastised Sutton for spilling what they believed was water. He cleaned up most of the liquid and left to check if anything leaked onto the engines and to report the incident to the chief engineer. In the engine room, coal heaver Alfred Clum saw the liquid drip from the deckhead and moved to cover the engine heads with canvas when some of the turpentine fell onto his lighted lamp and ignited. The blaze rapidly engulfed the steam chest as Clum ran to get water. At about 8:05, a boatswain's mate on the gun deck spotted flames emerging from the forward hatch and yelled, "fire!" The alarm was relayed by a drummer boy, who immediately jumped ship. The crew manned pumps, hoses, and formed bucket brigades to combat the fire as it consumed hemp, oil, turpentine and paint in the storeroom and spread across the berth deck. The first lieutenant responded when the alarm was first raised and ordered the aft magazine to be flooded. He attempted to reach the forward magazine, which contained nearly 3,000 pounds (1,400 kg) of gunpowder, but was blocked by the flames. Sailors jettisoned shells and other explosives overboard as the ship's engineers opened valves to flood the bilge. A sentry was posted outside the ship's supply of spirits during the chaos.

Newton and Cushing arrived at about 8:20, and the two climbed aboard. Cushing ran to save his documents, which included an official letter to the Emperor of China. A distress signal was fired, which was responded to by sailors from Gibraltar and several nearby vessels, including HMS Malabar, a British ship of the line. Boats from Gibraltar, one crewed by convicts and another containing Royal Sappers, came alongside Missouri and poured water down an air port. An additional boat containing carpenters from Malabar attempted to scuttle the steamship by drilling a hole in her side, but were unable to pierce the hull. Boats from adjacent American vessels came alongside and saved important items from the burning ship, including the chronometers, paymaster's logs, and bullion coin; a British steamship attempted to tow her into deeper water, but Missouri was flooded with 8 feet (2.4 m) of water and rested at an angle on the harbor's floor.

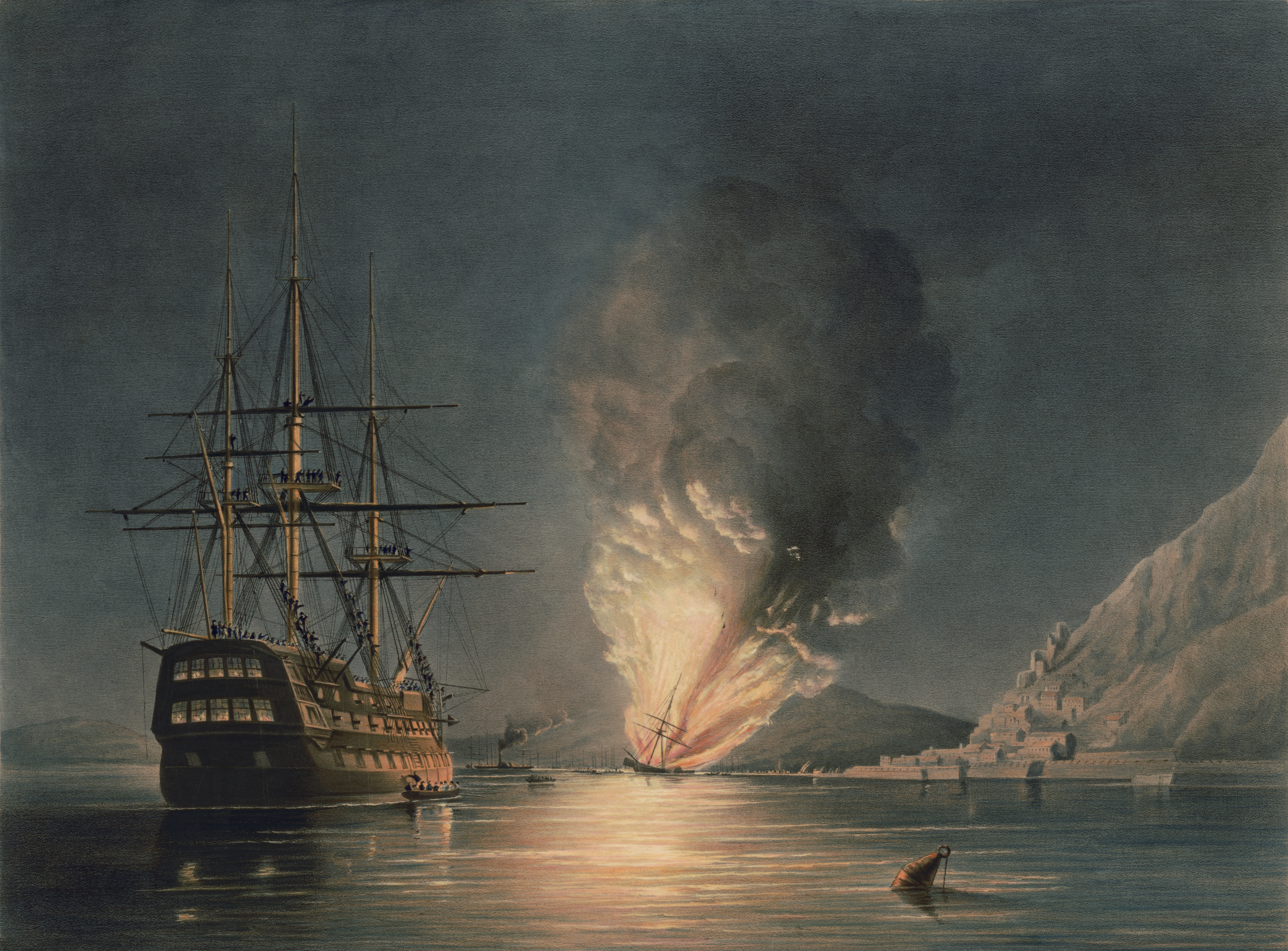
The crew of HMS Malabar (left) watch the magazine of USS Missouri explode after attempting to help the Americans fight the fire.

The Anglo-American effort initially succeeded in containing the fire, but a breeze fanned the flames as Missouri's crew were pushed towards the bow and stern. After discussing the issue with officers from Missouri and Malabar, Newton believed the effort was pointless and ordered the ship to be abandoned as he stood atop the wheel house. He was the last off, and minutes later, the ship's mainmast collapsed. Some time later, the two bow guns fell through the deck and one exploded. At about 2 am, Missouri's forward magazine detonated, obliterating the bow; the wreck continued to burn for another six hours. The entire ship's complement of 384 reconvened on Malabar from the various boats the men fled on. The only casualty was one of the ship's mascots, a bear originally from USS Ontario. The animal was spooked by the fire and was unable to be taken off the ship. The ship's crew remained in Gibraltar to salvage the wreck for a week. They were sent to Boston on board a chartered American ship and arrived 42 days later. Newton and several others stayed behind to further dismantle the ship, and efforts were aided when Congress budgeted $60,000 (equivalent to $2,100,000 in 2025) to destroy the wreck. Congress also thanked Wilson for the British aid provided to the crew of Missouri.

=== Legacy ===
Without the frigate, Cushing traveled east on land to reach China. At Suez, he took a British steamship to Bombay and rendezvoused with USS Brandywine, which was already carrying other members of his delegation. He arrived at Macao on 24 February 1844, and negotiated the Treaty of Wanghia. The agreement forced China to establish several treaty ports with the US and completed Cushing's task.

Newton was subsequently court-martialed and accused of negligence in the loss of the ship, and the trial concluded in October 1844. He was convicted and sentenced to a two-year long suspension from service, but in March 1845, Tyler remitted the remaining portion of the suspension and wrote in his order that, "there is nothing implicating in the slightest degree the moral standing of Captain Newton" and that the disaster was due to the steam engines. Missouri's chief engineer was also court-martialed and was suspended for one year, although only eight months were served before the punishment was likewise remitted.

Over the next several decades, steam slowly gained popularity throughout the fleet. The last sail-only warship built for the Navy was the sloop-of-war USS Constellation, completed in 1854. While Constellation could feasibly have been built as a steamship, the sailing sloop was built as a cheap and economical replacement for the sailing frigate USS Constellation; both ships had the same name. Regardless, anti-steamship sentiment continued. After the American Civil War, an audit led by Louis Goldsborough condemned many new steam warships as "naval trash" and strongly pushed to focus on sail. Under de facto Secretary of the Navy David Porter, every warship was ordered to be fitted with sails and the development and use of steam engines were severely limited. Starting in 1869, the Navy was marked by an era of institutional decline and hostility to new technology that ended with the Squadron of Evolution in the early 1880s.

== See also ==
- French corvette Sphinx (1829), first paddle steamer of the French Navy
- HMS Dee (1832), first paddle steamer of the Royal Navy
- SS Savannah, first steamship to cross the Atlantic
