= Bulkhead (partition) =

Vertical partition inside a ship

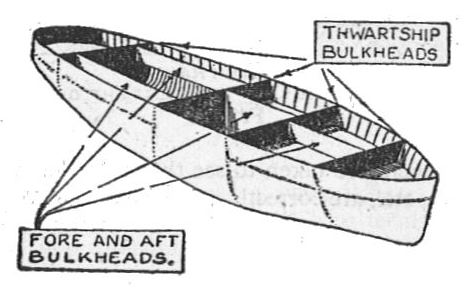
Compartmentalisation of a ship, to reduce floodability

A bulkhead is an upright wall within the hull of a ship, the fuselage of an airplane, or the body of a car. Other kinds of partition elements within a ship are decks and deckheads.

== Etymology ==
The word bulki meant "cargo" in Old Norse. During the 15th century sailors and builders in Europe realized that walls within a vessel would prevent cargo from shifting during passage. In shipbuilding, any vertical panel was called a head. So walls installed abeam (side-to-side) in a vessel's hull were called "bulkheads". Now, the term bulkhead applies to every vertical panel aboard a ship, except for the hull itself.

== History ==
Bulkheads were known to the ancient Greeks, who employed bulkheads in triremes to support the back of rams. By the Athenian trireme era (500 BC), the hull was strengthened by enclosing the bow behind the ram, forming a bulkhead compartment. Instead of using bulkheads to protect ships against rams, Greeks preferred to reinforce the hull with extra timber along the waterline, making larger ships resistant to ramming by smaller ones.

A twin-hulled boat unearthed in Bac Ninh, Vietnam, features a series of bulkheads along each hull, which help strengthen the structure. The boat is dated to about 1,600–1,800 years ago. If so, this would represent the earliest archaeological evidence of bulkheads found anywhere in the world to date.

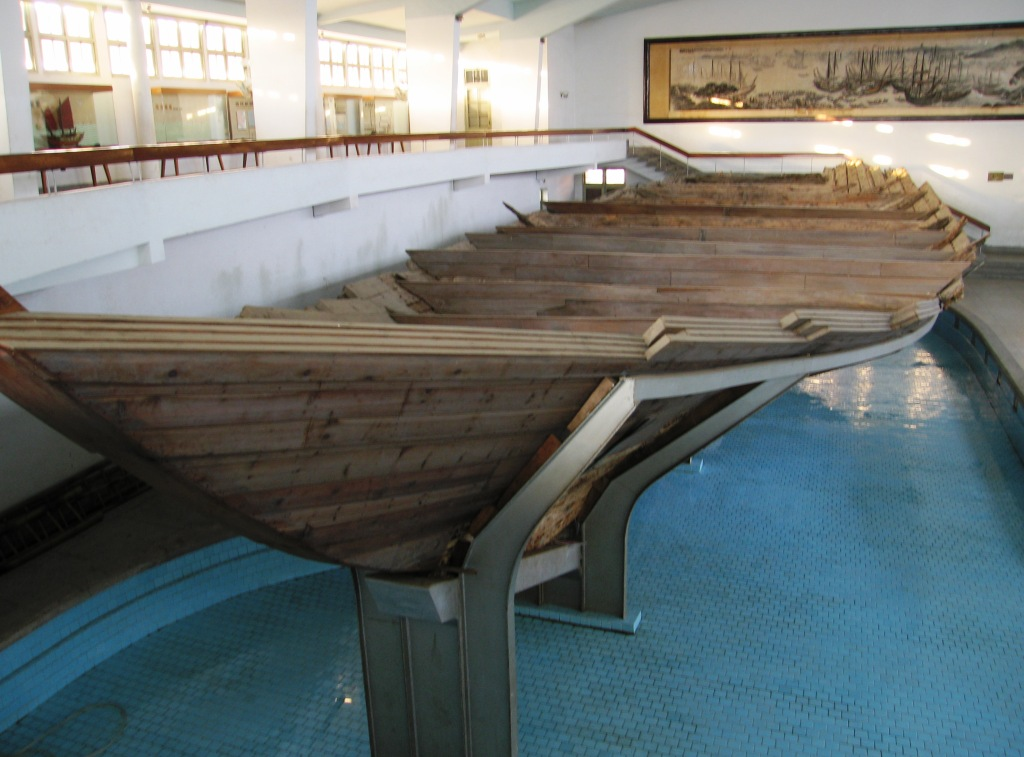
The remains of the Quanzhou ship, dated to the Song dynasty and discovered in 1973

Bulkhead partitions are considered to have been a feature of Chinese junks, a type of ship. Song dynasty author Zhu Yu (fl. 12th century) wrote in his book of 1119 that the hulls of Chinese ships had a bulkhead build. The 5th-century book Garden of Strange Things by Liu Jingshu mentioned that a ship could allow water to enter the bottom without sinking. Archaeological evidence of bulkhead partitions has been found on a 24 m (78 ft) long Song dynasty ship dredged from the waters off the southern coast of China in 1973, the hull of the ship divided into twelve walled compartmental sections built watertight, dated to about 1277.

Texts written by writers such as Marco Polo (1254–1324), Ibn Battuta (1304–1369), Niccolò Da Conti (1395–1469), and Benjamin Franklin (1706–1790) describe the bulkhead partitions of East Asian shipbuilding. An account of the early fifteenth century describes Indian ships as being built in compartments so that even if one part was damaged, the rest remained intact—a forerunner of the modern day watertight compartments using bulkheads.

As wood began to be replaced by iron in European ships in the 18th century, new structures, like bulkheads, started to become prevalent. Bulkhead partitions became widespread in Western shipbuilding during the early 19th century. Benjamin Franklin wrote in a 1787 letter that "as these vessels are not to be laden with goods, their holds may without inconvenience be divided into separate apartments, after the Chinese manner, and each of these apartments caulked tight so as to keep out water." A 19th-century book on shipbuilding attributes the introduction of watertight bulkheads to Charles Wye Williams, known for his steamships.

== Purpose ==
Bulkheads in a ship serve several purposes:

- increase the structural rigidity of the vessel,
- divide functional areas into rooms and
- create watertight compartments that can contain water in the case of a hull breach or other leak.
- some bulkheads and decks are fire-resistance rated to achieve compartmentalisation, a passive fire protection measure; see firewall (construction).
- As per SOLAS, fire bulk heads are classified in class A(30 min), Class B(30 mins) and Class C divisions.

Not all bulkheads are intended to be watertight, in modern ships the bottom floor is supported against the hull by transverse walls (bulkheads) and longitudinal walls, being common to use bulkheads with lightening holes.

On an aircraft, bulkheads divide the cabin into multiple areas. On passenger aircraft a common application is for physically dividing cabins used for different classes of service (e.g. economy and business.) On combination cargo/passenger, or "combi" aircraft, bulkhead walls are inserted to divide areas intended for passenger seating and cargo storage.

== Requirements of bulkheads ==
=== Fire-resistance ===
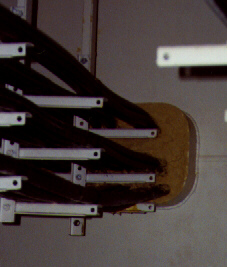
Firestopped electrical cable penetration in a bulkhead which is required to have a fire-resistance rating. The firestop is made of a purpose-designed putty on the outside and a proprietary cementitious fill on the inside.

Openings in fire-resistance rated bulkheads and decks must be firestopped to restore the fire-resistance ratings that would otherwise be compromised if the openings were left unsealed. The authority having jurisdiction for such measures varies depending upon the flag of the ship. Merchant vessels are typically subject to the regulations and inspections of the coast guards of the flag country. Combat ships are subject to the regulations set out by the navy of the country that owns the ship.

=== Prevention of electromagnetic damage ===
Bulkheads and decks of warships may be fully electrically grounded as a countermeasure against damage from electromagnetic interference and electromagnetic pulse due to nearby nuclear or electromagnetic bomb detonations, which could severely damage the vital electronic systems on a ship.

In the case of firestops, cable jacketing is usually removed within the seal and firestop rubber modules are internally fitted with copper shields, which contact the cables' armour to ground the seal.

== Automotive ==
Most passenger vehicles and some freight vehicles will have a bulkhead which separates the engine compartment from the passenger compartment or cab; the automotive use is analogous to the nautical term in that the bulkhead is an internal wall which separates different parts of the vehicle. In American English this is often called a firewall. Some passenger vehicles (particularly sedan/saloon-type vehicles) will also have a rear bulkhead, which separates the passenger compartment from the trunk/boot.

== Other uses of the term ==
The term was later applied to other vehicles, such as railroad cars, hopper cars, trams, automobiles, aircraft or spacecraft, as well as to containers, intermediate bulk containers and fuel tanks. In some of these cases bulkheads are airtight to prevent air leakage or the spread of a fire. The term may also be used for the "end walls" of bulkhead flatcars.

Mechanically, a partition or panel through which connectors pass, or a connector designed to pass through a partition.

In architecture the term is frequently used to denote any boxed in beam or other downstand from a ceiling and by extension even the vertical downstand face of an area of lower ceiling beyond. This usage presumably derives from experience on boats where to maintain the structural function personnel openings through bulkheads always retain a portion of the bulkhead crossing the head of the opening. Head strikes on these downstand elements are commonplace, hence in architecture any overhead downstand element comes to be referred to as a bulkhead.

Bulkhead also refers to a moveable structure often found in an Olympic-size swimming pool, as a means to set the pool into a "double-ended short course" configuration, or long-course, depending on the type of event being run. Pool bulkheads are usually air-fillable, but power driven solutions do exist.

The term is also used to refer to large retroactively installed pressure barriers for temporary or permanent use, often during maintenance or construction activities.

== See also ==
- Compartmentalization (fire protection)
- Fire protection
- Fireproofing
- Intumescent
- Rear pressure bulkhead
- Structural steel
