= Andrew Brinn =

- Born: c. 1829; Scotland
- Military career
- Allegiance: United States of America
- Branch: United States Navy
- Rank: Seaman
- Unit: USS Mississippi
- Awards: Medal of Honor

Seaman Andrew Brinn (born c. 1829) was a Scottish sailor who fought in the American Civil War. Brinn received the country's highest award for bravery during combat, the Medal of Honor, for his action aboard the USS Mississippi at Port Hudson on 14 March 1863. He was honored with the award on 10 July 1863.

== Medal of Honor citation ==
Served on board the U.S.S. Mississippi during her abandonment and firing in the engagement at Port Hudson, 14 March 1863. Remaining under enemy fire for 2 1/2 hours, Brinn remained on board the grounded vessel until all the abandoning crew had landed. After asking to be assigned some duty, he was finally ordered to save himself and to leave the Mississippi which had been deliberately fired to prevent her falling into rebel hands.

== See also ==
- List of American Civil War Medal of Honor recipients: A–F
