= Christopher Brennan (sailor) =

United States Medal of Honor recipient

- Born: c. 1832; Ireland
- Military career
- Allegiance: United States
- Branch: United States Navy
- Service years: 1861 - 1864
- Rank: Acting Master's Mate
- Units: USS Colorado; USS Mississippi
- Conflicts: American Civil War • Battle of Forts Jackson and St. Philip
- Awards: Medal of Honor

Christopher Brennan (born c. 1832, date of death unknown) was a Union Navy sailor in the American Civil War and a recipient of the U.S. military's highest decoration, the Medal of Honor, for his actions at the Battle of Forts Jackson and St. Philip.

== Biography ==
Born in about 1832 in Ireland, Brennan joined the US Navy from Boston, Massachusetts in May 1861. He initially served as a seaman on the USS Colorado. At the Battle of Forts Jackson and St. Philip near New Orleans on April 24, 1862, he joined the USS Mississippi and manned one of that ship's guns through the engagement. His commanding officer stated that he "was the life and soul of the gun's crew." For this action, he was awarded the Medal of Honor a year later on July 10, 1863. Brennan re-enlisted twice more, and was promoted to Acting Master's Mate in November 1863. He deserted the Navy in August 1864, and the remainder of his life is unknown.

Brennan's official Medal of Honor citation reads:

On board the U.S.S. Mississippi during attacks on Forts Jackson and St. Philip and during the taking of New Orleans, 24–25 April 1862. Taking part in the actions which resulted in the damaging of the Mississippi and several casualties on it, Brennan showed skill and courage throughout the entire engagements which resulted in the taking of St. Philip and Jackson and in the surrender of New Orleans.

== See also ==
- List of American Civil War Medal of Honor recipients: A-F
