= Repulse-class ship of the line =

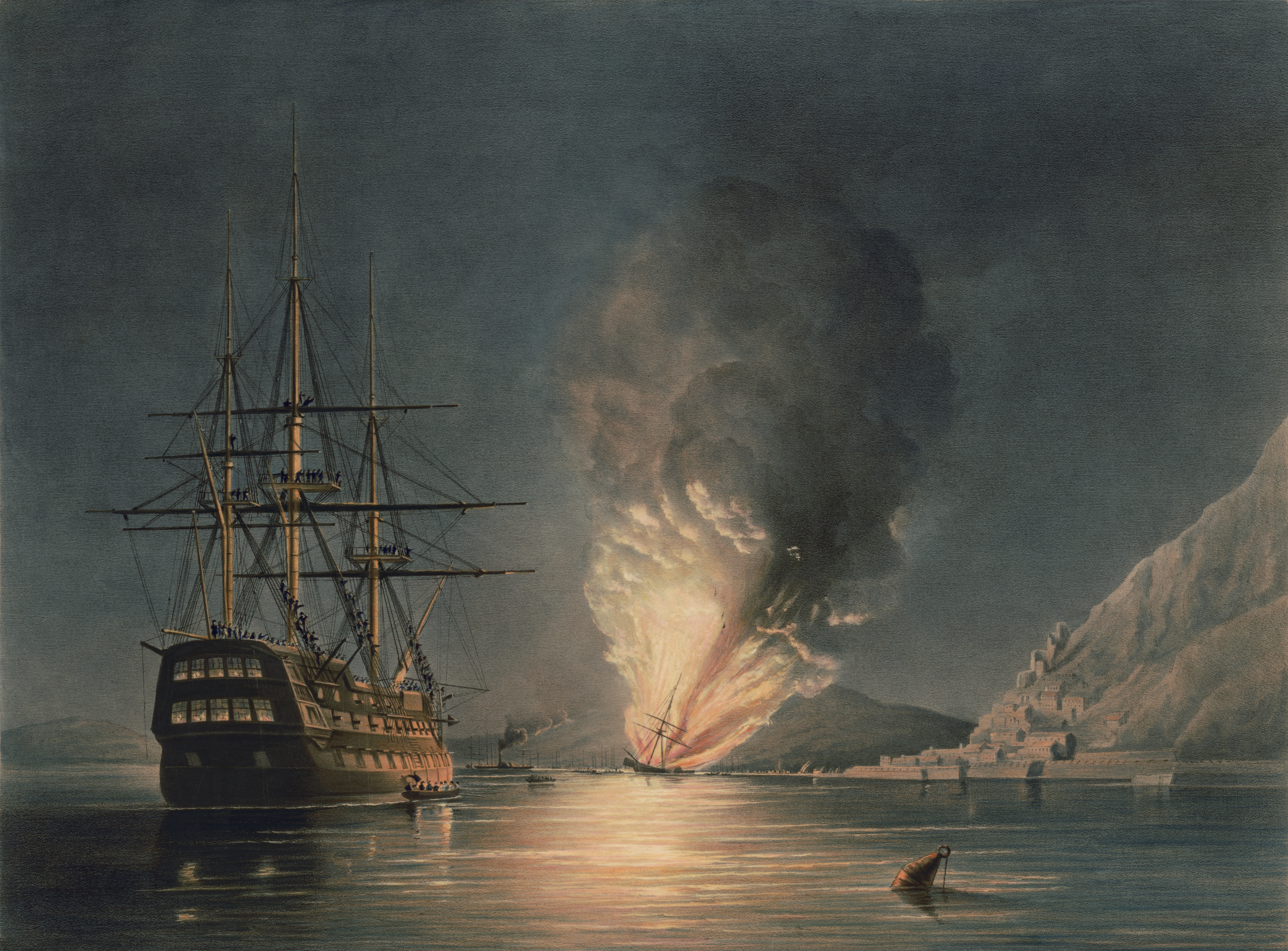
- HMS Malabar (left) at the explosion of USS Missouri

Class overview
- Name: Repulse
- Operators: Royal Navy
- Preceded by: Fame class
- Succeeded by: Swiftsure class
- In service: 11 December 1802 - 1926
- Completed: 11

General characteristics
- Type: Ship of the line
- Tons burthen: 1,706 8/94 (bm)
- Length: 174 ft (53 m) (gundeck)
- Beam: 47 ft 4 in (14.4 m)
- Depth of hold: 20 ft (6.1 m)
- Sail plan: Full-rigged ship
- Complement: 590
- Armament: 74 muzzle-loading, smoothbore guns; Gundeck: 28 × 32 pdr guns; Upper deck: 28 × 18 pdr guns; Quarterdeck: 2 × 18 pdr guns + 12 × 32 pdr carronades; Forecastle: 2 × 18 pdr guns + 2 × 32 pdr carronades; Poop deck: 6 × 18 pdr carronades

The Repulse-class ships of the line were a class of eleven 74-gun third rates, designed for the Royal Navy by Sir William Rule. The first three ships to this design were ordered in 1800, with a second batch of five following in 1805. The final three ships of the class were ordered towards the end of the Napoleonic Wars to a modified version of Rule's draught, using the new interlocking, diagonal truss system created by Sir Robert Seppings; all three were completed after the war's end.

== Description ==
The Repulse-class ships were designed to measure 174 feet (53 m) on the gundeck and 143 feet 2 inches (43.6 m) on the keel. They had a beam of 47 feet 4 inches (14.4 m), a depth of hold of 20 feet (6.1 m) and had a tonnage of 1,7068/94 tons burthen. The ships' draught varied considerably between ships. The Repulse-class ships were armed with 74 muzzle-loading, smoothbore guns that consisted of twenty-eight 32-pounder guns on her lower gundeck and twenty-eight 18-pounder guns on her upper gundeck. Their forecastle mounted a pair of 18-pounder guns and two 32-pounder carronades. On their quarterdeck they carried two 18-pounders and a dozen 32-pounder carronades. Above the quarterdeck was their poop deck with half-a-dozen 18-pounder carronades. Their crew numbered 590 officers and ratings. The ships were fitted with three masts and ship-rigged.

== Ships ==
- HMS Sceptre

Builder: Dudman, Deptford Wharf
Ordered: 4 February 1800
Laid down: December 1800
Launched: 11 December 1802
Fate: Broken up, 1821

- HMS Repulse

Builder: Barnard, Deptford Wharf
Ordered: 4 February 1800
Laid down: September 1800
Launched: 22 July 1803
Fate: Broken up, 1820

- HMS Eagle

Builder: Pitcher, Northfleet
Ordered: 4 February 1800
Laid down: August 1800
Launched: 27 February 1804
Fate: Burnt, 1926

- HMS Magnificent

Builder: Perry, Wells & Green, Blackwall Yard
Ordered: 31 January 1805
Laid down: April 1805
Launched: 30 August 1806
Fate: Sold out of the service, 1843

- HMS Valiant

Builder: Perry, Wells & Green, Blackwall
Ordered: 24 January 1805
Laid down: April 1805
Launched: 24 January 1807
Fate: Broken up, 1823

- HMS Elizabeth

Builder: Wells, Blackwall
Ordered: 24 January 1805
Laid down: August 1805
Launched: 23 May 1807
Fate: Broken up, 1820

- HMS Cumberland

Builder: Pitcher, Northfleet
Ordered: 24 January 1805
Laid down: August 1805
Launched: 19 August 1807
Fate: Sold out of the service, 1870

- HMS Venerable

Builder: Pitcher, Northfleet
Ordered: 24 January 1805
Laid down: December 1805
Launched: 12 April 1808
Fate: Broken up, 1838

- HMS Talavera

Builder: Woolwich Dockyard
Ordered: 15 February 1814
Laid down: July 1814
Launched: 15 October 1818
Fate: Burnt, 1840

- HMS Malabar

Builder: Bombay Dockyard
Ordered: 7 March 1815
Laid down: April 1817
Launched: 28 December 1818
Fate: Sold out of the service, 1905

- HMS Belleisle

Builder: Pembroke Dockyard
Ordered: 17 November 1812
Laid down: February 1816
Launched: 26 April 1819
Fate: Broken up, 1872
