= USS Mississippi (1841) =

Gunboat of the United States Navy

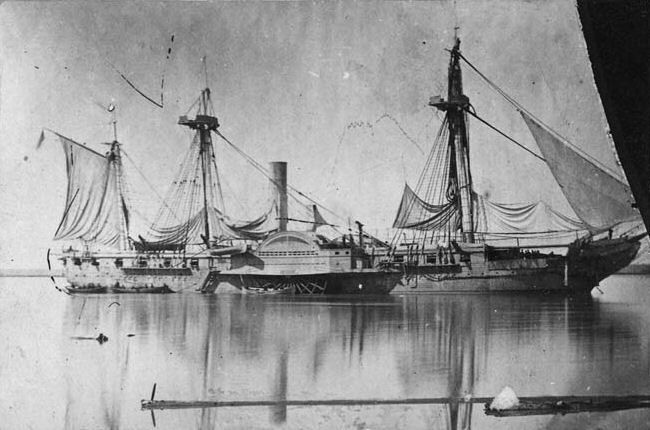
- USS Mississippi about 1863

History

United States
- Name: USS Mississippi
- Builder: Philadelphia Navy Yard
- Laid down: 1839
- Launched: 1842
- Commissioned: 22 December 1841
- Fate: Scuttled, 14 March 1863

General characteristics
- Type: Steam frigate
- Displacement: 3,220 long tons (3,272 t)
- Length: 229 ft (70 m)
- Beam: 40 ft (12 m)
- Depth of hold: 19 ft (5.8 m)
- Propulsion: Steam engine
- Speed: 8 knots (15 km/h; 9.2 mph)
- Armament: 2 × 10 in (250 mm) Paixhans guns; 8 × 8 in (200 mm) Paixhans guns

USS Mississippi, a paddle frigate, was the first ship of the United States Navy to bear that name. She was named for the Mississippi River. Her sister ship was Missouri. Her keel was laid down by the Philadelphia Navy Yard in 1839; built under the personal supervision of Commodore Matthew Perry. She was commissioned on 22 December 1841, with Captain W. D. Salter in command and launched several weeks later.

== Service history ==
=== Mexican–American War ===
After several years of service in the Home Squadron, during which she performed experiments crucial to development of the steam Navy, Mississippi joined the West Indian Squadron in 1845 as flagship for Commodore Perry. During the Mexican–American War, she took part in expeditions against Alvarado, Tampico, Pánuco, and Laguna de Términos, all successful in tightening American control of the Mexican coastline and interrupting coastwise commerce and military supply operations.

She returned to Norfolk for repairs on 1 January 1847, then arrived at Veracruz on 21 March 1847, carrying Perry to take command of the American fleet. At once she and her men plunged into amphibious operations against Veracruz, supplying guns and their crews to be taken ashore for the battery which fought the city to surrender in four days. Through the remainder of the war, Mississippi contributed guns, men, and boats to a series of coastal raids on Mexico's east coast, taking part in the capture of Tabasco in June 1847.

=== Mission to Japan ===
Mississippi cruised the Mediterranean Sea during 1849–1851. On 28 August 1851, Mississippi ran aground off Smyrna, Ottoman Empire whilst on her way to collect Louis Kossuth before taking him into exile in the United States. Initial attempts to refloat her by the British paddle steamer Euxine and three other vessels were unsuccessful. She was refloated on 26 August. Mississippi was then prepared for Commodore Perry's expedition to Japan. Serving as the flagship; it was commanded by Sydney Smith Lee. The squadron cleared Hampton Roads on 24 November 1852, for Madeira, the Cape of Good Hope, Hong Kong, and Shanghai, which was reached 4 May 1853.

The squadron now approached Japan by calls in the Ryukyu Islands and Bonin Islands, and entered Edo Bay on 8 July 1853, remaining until the Japanese accepted an official letter by President Millard Fillmore on 14 July. After further cruising in the Far East, Mississippi and the squadron returned to Japan on 12 February 1854, remaining as part of Perry's show of force until the signing of the Convention of Kanagawa on 31 March. Mississippi returned to New York City on 23 April 1855, and again sailed for the Far East on 19 August 1857, to base at Shanghai and patrol in support of America's burgeoning trade with the Orient. As the flagship for Commodore Josiah Tattnall III, she was present during the British and French attack on the Chinese forts at Taku in June 1859, and two months later, she landed a force at Shanghai when the American consul requested her aid in restoring order to the city, torn by civil strife. She returned to ordinary at Boston, Massachusetts, in January 1860, but was reactivated when the American Civil War became inevitable.

=== Civil War ===
Mississippi arrived off Key West, Florida, to institute the blockade there on 8 June 1861, and five days later made her first capture, the schooner Forest King bound with coffee from Rio de Janeiro to New Orleans, Louisiana. On 27 November 1861, off Northeast Pass of the Mississippi River, she joined Vincennes in capturing the British bark Empress, again carrying coffee from Rio to New Orleans. The following spring, she joined Farragut's squadron for the planned assault on New Orleans. After several attempts, on 7 April 1862, she and Pensacola successfully passed over the bar at Southwest Pass, the heaviest ships ever to enter the river to that time.

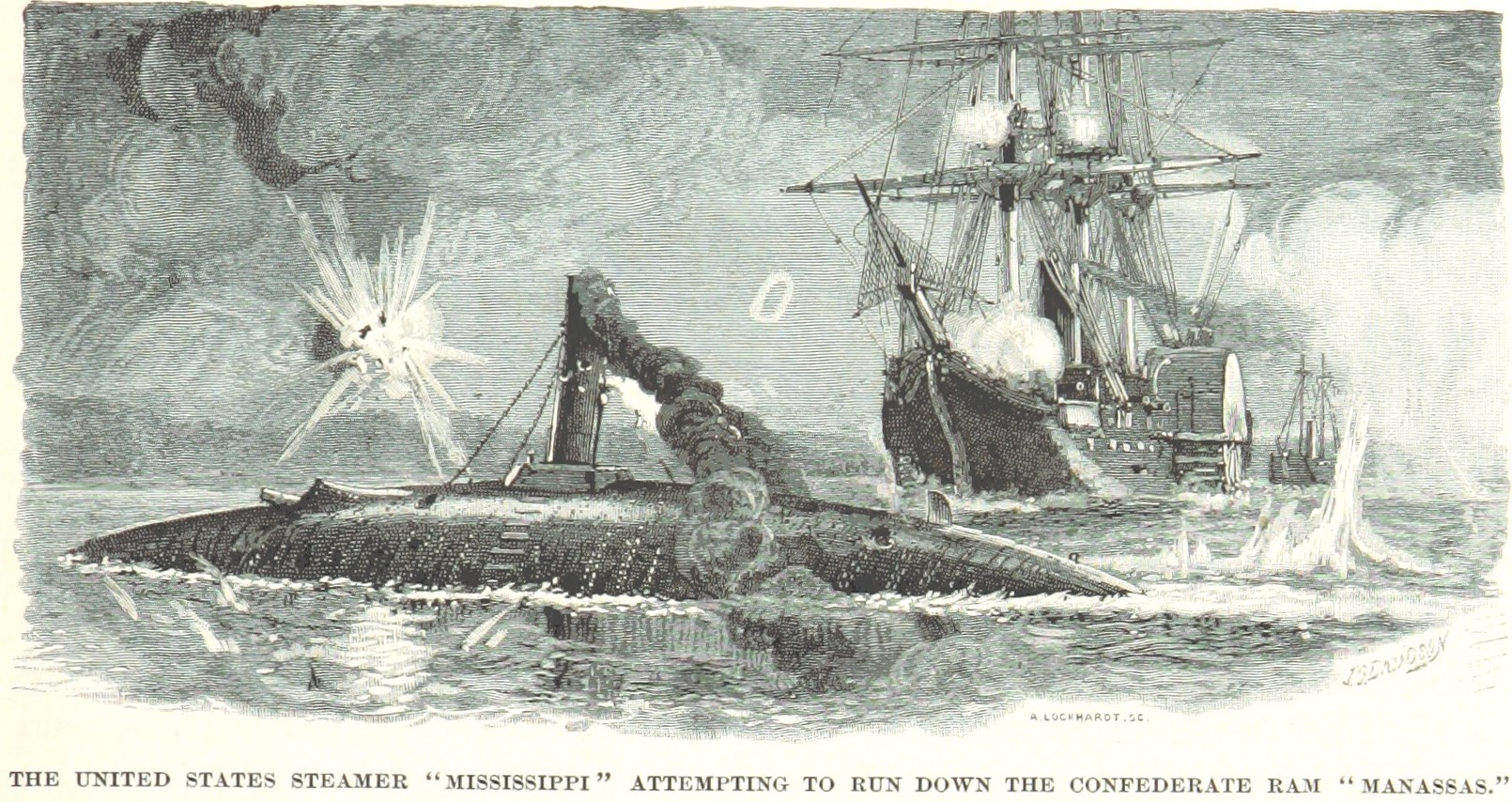
Mississippi attempts to ram Manassas

As Farragut brought his fleet up the river, a key engagement occurred at the Battle of Forts Jackson and St. Philip on 24 April 1862, during which Mississippi ran the Confederate ram Manassas ashore, wrecking her with two mighty broadsides. One of her sailors, Seaman Christopher Brennan, was awarded the Medal of Honor for his part in the battle. The city was now doomed, and Mississippi, her heavy draft making her less suitable to river operations than lighter ships, remained off New Orleans for much of the next year.

Ordered upriver for the operations against Port Hudson, Louisiana, Mississippi sailed with six other ships lashed in pairs, while she sailed alone. On 14 March 1863, she grounded while attempting to pass the forts guarding Port Hudson. Under enemy fire, every effort was made to refloat her by Captain Melancton Smith and his executive officer George Dewey (later to achieve fame as an admiral). At last, her machinery was destroyed, her battery spiked, and she was set ablaze to prevent Confederate capture. When the flames reached her magazines, she blew up and sank. Three of Mississippi's men, Seaman Andrew Brinn, Boatswain's Mate Peter Howard, and U.S. Marine Corps Sergeant Pinkerton R. Vaughn, were awarded the Medal of Honor for their actions during the abandonment. She lost 64 men, with the accompanying ships saving 223 of her crew.

== See also ==
- List of steam frigates of the United States Navy
- Bibliography of early American naval history
