= Peter Howard (Medal of Honor) =

- Born: c. 1829; France
- Died: March 25, 1875 (aged 45); Brooklyn, New York, US
- Military career
- Allegiance: United States
- Branch: United States Navy
- Service years: 1861–1867
- Rank: Acting ensign
- Unit: USS Mississippi
- Awards: Medal of Honor

Peter Howard (c. 1829 – March 25, 1875) was a United States Navy boatswain's mate, who earned the Medal of Honor for his actions while serving on board the USS Mississippi during the American Civil War.

Howard joined the Navy from Boston in May 1861. Following his MOH action, he was promoted to Acting ensign in November 1863, and discharged in November 1867.

== Medal of Honor citation ==
- Rank and organization: Boatswain's Mate, U.S. Navy.
- Born: 1829 France.
- Accredited to: Massachusetts.
- General Orders No.: 17, 10 July 1863.

Citation:

Served on board the USS Mississippi during the action against Port Hudson, 14 March 1863. Running aground during the darkness and in the midst of battle while exposed to a devastating fire from enemy shore batteries, the Mississippi was ordered abandoned after a long and desperate attempt to free her. Serving courageously throughout this period in which a steady fire was kept up against the enemy until the ship was enveloped in flames and abandoned. Howard acted gallantly in his duties as boatswain's mate. Soon after the firing of the Mississippi and its abandonment, it was seen to slide off the shoal, drift downstream and explode, leaving no possibility of its falling into enemy hands.
