= HMS Malabar (1818) =

Ship of the line of the Royal Navy

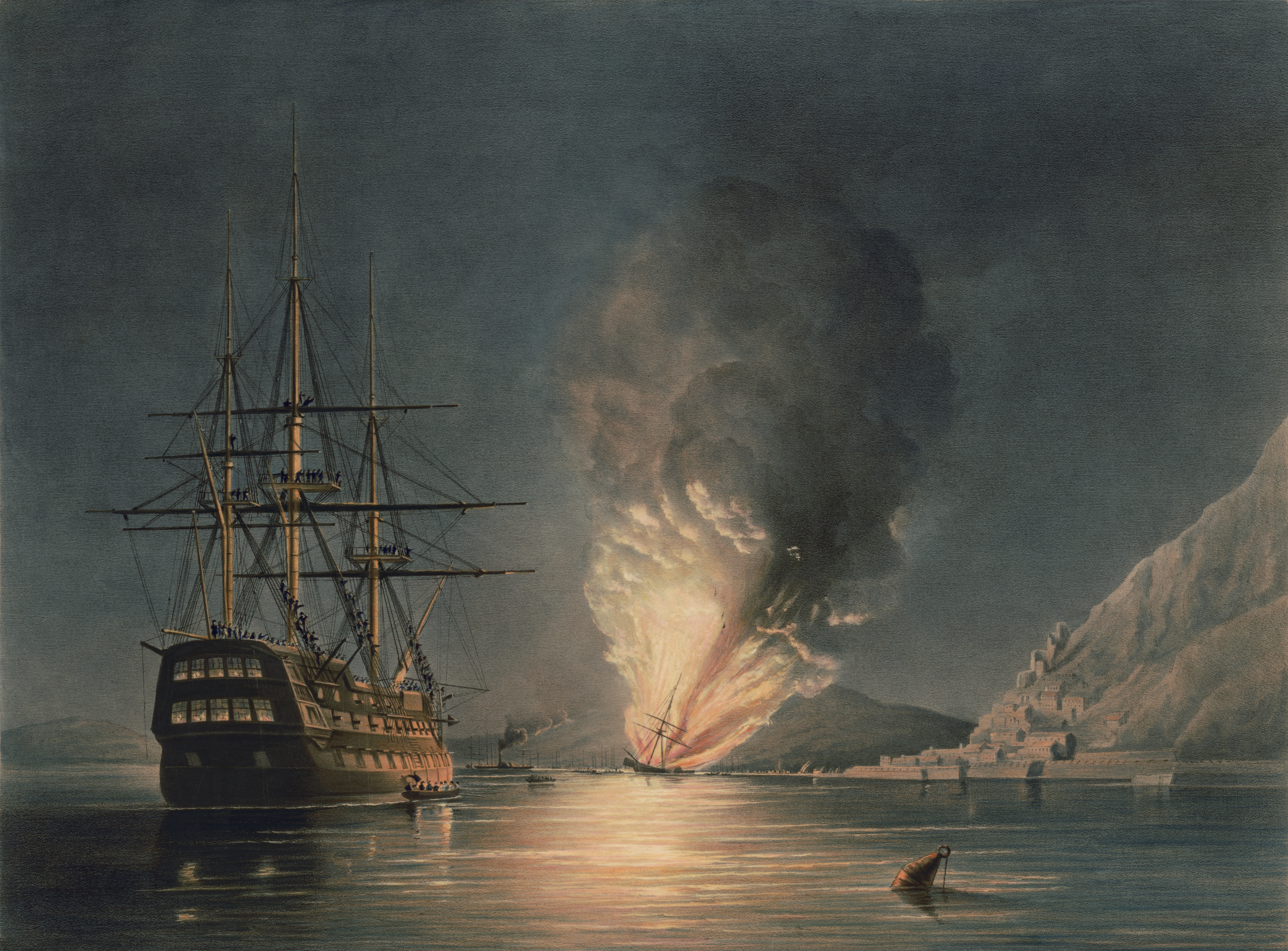
- Malabar (left) at the explosion of USS Missouri

History

United Kingdom
- Name: Malabar
- Ordered: 7 March 1815
- Builder: Bombay Dockyard
- Laid down: April 1817
- Launched: 28 December 1818
- Commissioned: 16 October 1832
- Decommissioned: Late 1844
- Renamed: Myrtle, October 1883
- Reclassified: As a coal hulk, October 1848
- Fate: Sold, 17 July 1905

General characteristics
- Class & type: Repulse-class ship of the line
- Tons burthen: 1,715 15/94 (bm)
- Length: 174 ft 3 in (53.1 m) (gundeck)
- Beam: 48 ft 2 in (14.7 m)
- Depth of hold: 19 ft 11 in (6.1 m)
- Sail plan: Full-rigged ship
- Complement: 590
- Armament: 74 muzzle-loading, smoothbore guns; Gundeck: 28 × 32 pdr guns; Upper deck: 28 × 18 pdr guns; Quarterdeck: 2 × 18 pdr guns + 12 × 32 pdr carronades; Forecastle: 2 × 18 pdr guns + 2 × 32 pdr carronades; Poop deck: 6 × 18 pdr carronades

HMS Malabar was a 74-gun third-rate Repulse-class ship of the line built for the Royal Navy in the 1810s. She was not commissioned until 1832 and served with the Mediterranean Fleet and the North America and West Indies Station. The ship ran aground in 1838, but was quickly refloated. Her crew assisted with the fire that destroyed the American paddle frigate USS Missouri in 1843 and rescued many of the ship's survivors. Malabar was converted into a coal hulk in 1848 and was renamed Myrtle in 1883. The ship was sold out of the service in 1905.

== Description ==
Built from teak, Malabar measured 174 feet 3 inches (53.1 m) on the gundeck and 143 feet 5 inches (43.7 m) on the keel. She had a beam of 48 feet 2 inches (14.7 m), a depth of hold of 19 feet 11 inches (6.1 m) and had a tonnage of 1,715 15/94 tons burthen. The ship's draught is unknown. The Repulse-class ships were armed with 74 muzzle-loading, smoothbore guns that consisted of twenty-eight 32-pounder guns on her lower gundeck and twenty-eight 18-pounder guns on her upper gundeck. Their forecastle mounted a pair of 18-pounder guns and two 32-pounder carronades. On their quarterdeck they carried two 18-pounders and a dozen 32-pounder carronades. Above the quarterdeck was their poop deck with half-a-dozen 18-pounder carronades. Their crew numbered 590 officers and ratings. Their crew numbered 590 officers and ratings. The ships were fitted with three masts and ship-rigged.

== Construction and career ==
Malabar was the fourth ship of her name to serve in the Royal Navy. She was ordered on 7 March 1815 from the East India Company as part of the third batch of three Repulse-class ships of the line designed by Sir William Rule, co-Surveyor of the Navy. Incorporating co-Surveyor of the Navy, Robert Seppings' interlocking, diagonal trusses, the ship was laid down at their Bombay Dockyard in April 1817 and was launched on 28 December 1818. She was built by the Parsi master shipwright Jamsetjee Bomanjee Wadia.

Malabar sailed from Bombay (modern Mumbai) on 5 April 1819 and arrived at Portsmouth on 18 September. Included in her cargo were the frames for the 80-gun second rate Hindostan. The ship was placed in ordinary until commissioned by Captain Josceline Percy on 16 October 1832 and completed for sea at HM Dockyard, Portsmouth in October–November for service with the Mediterranean Fleet. Captain Henry Mansell became the acting ship's captain on 24 December 1833 and was then appointed into the ship on 4 January 1834. Malabar was paid off in July and Sir William Montagu was appointed captain on 25 July for duties off Lisbon, Portugal. He was ordered home at the close of 1837 for the purpose of being paid off.

The ship was refitted to carry troops from January to April 1838 at HM Dockyard, Devonport and was recommissioned on 14 February by Captain Edward Harvey for the North America and West Indies Station. On 19 October 1838, Malabar ran aground off Prince Edward Island in British North America and was damaged. Two of her crew were lost. She was refloated on 20 October and towed into Three Rivers (Trois-Rivières) in Lower Canada for repairs. She was paid off in early 1839 and was refitted as a "demonstration ship" between January 1839 and 11 October 1841. Captain Sir George Sartorius recommissioned the ship on 19 August 1841 for service in the Mediterranean. On 26–27 August 1843, Malabar assisted in fighting a fire that destroyed the United States Navy sidewheel frigate Missouri at Gibraltar and took aboard about 200 of Missouri's survivors.

Malabar was converted into a coal hulk in October 1848 at Portsmouth and was renamed Myrtle on 10 October 1883. The ship was sold out of the navy on 17 July 1905.
