= Deckhead =

Underside of a deck in a ship

A deckhead is the underside of a deck in a ship. It bears the same relationship to a compartment on the deck below as does the ceiling to a room of a house.
