= Foxhall Parker =

Foxhall Parker may refer to:

- Foxhall A. Parker Sr. (1788–1857), United States Navy officer who fought in the War of 1812, father of Foxhall A. Parker Jr.
- Foxhall A. Parker Jr. (1821–1879), United States Navy officer who fought in the American Civil War, son of Foxhall A. Parker Sr.
