= William S. B. Lacy =

American Ambassador to Korea in 1955

William Sterling Byrd Lacy

3rd United States Ambassador to Korea
- In office May 12, 1955 – October 20, 1955
- President: Dwight D. Eisenhower
- Preceded by: Ellis O. Briggs
- Succeeded by: Walter C. Dowling

Personal details
- Born: February 5, 1910 Mesa County, Colorado
- Died: December 11, 1978 (aged 68) Washington, D.C.
- Cause of death: Cardiac arrest
- Resting place: Rock Creek Cemetery; 38°56′52″N 77°0′47″W
- Children: 2
- Parent: Sterling Byrd Lacy (father)
- Education: University of Colorado Boulder
- Profession: Diplomat

William Sterling Byrd Lacy (February 5, 1910 – December 11, 1978) was an American diplomat who served as the third United States Ambassador to Korea from May to October 1955.

He negotiated a series of cultural exchanges with the Soviet Union, which indirectly created the setting of the Kitchen Debate between Richard Nixon, the Vice President of the United States, and Nikita Khrushchev, the Premier of the Soviet Union.

== Biography ==
Lacy, the son of politician Sterling Byrd Lacy, was born in Mesa County, Colorado. His ancestral home was in Virginia, where he spent parts of his childhood. Lacy graduated from the University of Colorado Boulder in 1932 majoring in economics.

== Career at the State Department ==
Trained as an economist, Lacy joined the State Department in 1944 or in 1946, after working at the War Production Board and the United Nations Relief and Rehabilitation Administration.

In 1950, while serving as the chief of Philippines and South Asian affairs, he met with Bishop Ngô Đình Thục and Cardinal Francis Spellman to discuss Catholicism in the State of Vietnam, a policy the State Department would later support, which would later come to fruition in the policies of Thục's brother, Ngô Đình Diệm, as head of South Vietnam.

== Ambassador to Korea ==
On March 15, 1955, he was nominated as ambassador to Korea, to succeed Ellis O. Briggs; previously, he had served as deputy chief of mission in Manila for several years. Sworn in on March 28, he arrived in Seoul on May 8. By the end of the week, he had presented his credentials to Syngman Rhee.

His tenure as ambassador was strained, as tensions were high: riots and unrest occurred against the Neutral Nations Supervisory Commission, as South Koreans considered the commission to be tainted by Communist influence, and demonstrations rocked the United States Embassy and his residence; the Eighth Army began tightening restrictions on the black market, which Korean men saw as unfairly targeting them; and foreign businessmen, including Americans, charged that they were being unfairly taxed by the South Korean government; all of which contributed to an inability to work with Rhee.

Thus besieged on all sides, Lacy soon began his early departure as ambassador to Korea: on October 15, President Eisenhower accepted his resignation due to "ill health", a contrived excuse. He was succeeded by Walter C. Dowling in mid-1956. (Indeed, after Lacy left, it was noted that U.S. policy at the time seemed specifically tailored to angering Rhee and South Koreans.)

== Later career ==
After his time as ambassador, Lacy worked as a special assistant to Secretary of State John Foster Dulles.

In 1958, while serving as the President's Special Assistant to East-West Exchanges, he negotiated with the Soviet diplomat, G.N. Zaroubin, to begin a series of cultural and scientific exchanges between the two nations: these would lead to, in the words of Glenn T. Seaborg, "cooperation in peaceful nuclear applications" and "exchanges in the peaceful uses of nuclear energy". It was also considered to be a "major cultural agreement" for which Lacy received much credit.

By establishing a means of meeting and exhibition, exchanges also lead to the Kitchen Debate between Nikita Khrushchev, then the Premier of the Soviet Union, and Richard Nixon, in 1959.

Before he retired in 1961, he served as deputy commandant of the National War College.

== Personal life ==
In 1943, he married a British widow, Margaret Innes Franks, whose husband had died at the Battle of Dunkirk. With her, he had a son before their divorce; he later married Kirsten Magelssen, with whom he had a daughter; before marrying a third time, to Elizabeth.

William Sterling Byrd Lacy died on December 11, 1978, at the age of 68, survived by his third wife and children.

Diplomatic posts
Preceded by Ellis O. Briggs	United States Ambassador to Korea; 1955	Succeeded by Walter C. Dowling
