= USS Parker =

Two ships in the United States Navy have been named USS Parker for Foxhall A. Parker, Jr.

- The first USS Parker (DD-48) was an Aylwin-class destroyer, commissioned in 1913, served in World War I and was decommissioned in 1922.
- The second USS Parker (DD-604) was a Benson-class destroyer, commissioned in 1942, served in World War II and was decommissioned in 1947.

== See also ==
- USS Thaddeus Parker (DE-369), a John C. Butler-class destroyer escort
