= George Balch =

George Beall Balch
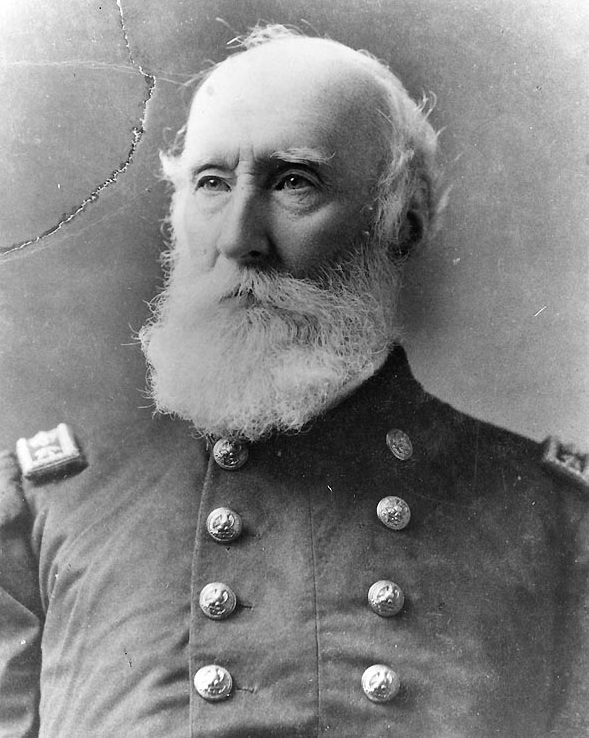
- Born: January 3, 1821; Shelbyville, Tennessee, U.S.
- Died: April 18, 1908 (aged 87); Raleigh, North Carolina, U.S.
- Military career
- Allegiance: United States of America
- Branch: United States Navy
- Service years: 1837–1883
- Rank: Rear Admiral
- Commands: USS Pocahontas; USS Pawnee; USS Albany; Pacific Squadron
- Conflicts: Mexican–American War; American Civil War

George Beall Balch (3 January 1821 – 18 April 1908) was a Rear Admiral in the United States Navy who served during the Mexican–American War and the American Civil War.

== Biography ==
=== Early career ===
Balch was born in Shelbyville, Tennessee, on 3 January 1821, and was appointed acting midshipman on 30 December 1837. After serving in the sloop Cyane during a cruise to the Mediterranean between 24 June 1838 and 16 May 1841, Balch saw duty in the schooner Grampus and the sloop Falmouth before attending the Naval School in Philadelphia, where he was promoted to passed midshipman on 29 June 1843.

=== Mexican–American War ===
Eventually assigned to the steamer Princeton, Balch served on her during the war with Mexico. He participated in the abortive August 1846 assault on Alvarado, where strong currents in the river prevented the flotilla's boats from landing, and in the successful 9 March 1847 landing of General Winfield Scott's army at Vera Cruz. During the latter campaign, Balch served as acting master of captured schooner Falcon.

Returning to Princeton, he accompanied the steamer on a two-year cruise to the Mediterranean, sailing east on 17 August 1847 and returning to the Boston Navy Yard on 17 July 1849. He then saw service at the Naval Observatory in Washington, D.C., where he was promoted to lieutenant on 16 August 1850.

=== Expedition to Japan ===
Balch then served as executive officer of the sloop-of-war Plymouth, sailing to the Orient on 23 August 1851 for an extended cruise on the East Indies Station. While there, Plymouth joined Commodore Matthew C. Perry's expedition to Japan and, in company with side-wheel steamers Mississippi and Susquehanna and sloop-of-war Saratoga, entered Tokyo Bay on 8 July 1853 for trade negotiations with the Tokugawa shogunate. The squadron departed on 17 July after presenting a letter from President Millard Fillmore to the Japanese asking for the opening of two ports to American trade and better treatment for shipwrecked sailors. The squadron spent the fall in Canton, Hong Kong and Shanghai, helping to protect American trade interests there (primarily tea and silk) following the continued spread of the Taiping Rebellion in southern China.

While most of Perry's squadron returned to Japan in February 1854, where the Commodore eventually signed a limited trade agreement on 31 March 1854, Plymouth remained at Shanghai to help protect American-owned warehouses and other property ashore. In February, soon after the squadron's departure to Japan, Imperial Chinese troops began assaulting foreigners, sacking warehouses and exacting tolls on boats sailing up and down the Huangpu River. On 3 April, after two British citizens were accosted by sword-wielding soldiers, the commanders of the British ships Encounter and Grecian, as well as Commander Kelly from Plymouth, together resolved to drive off the Chinese troops, who had established fortified camps in the city. The next day, Balch led 60 sailors and marines and 30 sailors from American merchant ships against the left flank of the entrenchments, while a force of 150 British sailors and marines, and additional "Shanghai volunteers," attacked on the right. Supported by gunfire from two privately owned field pieces and a howitzer, the Allied force routed the Chinese defenders, who "fled in great disorder, leaving behind them a number of wounded and dead." Balch suffered wounds in the action, which also saw one sailor killed and two marines wounded. The sloop-of-war returned to Norfolk on 11 January 1855 before conducting a spring cruise off the east coast as a Naval Academy school ship.

After an assignment to the Washington Navy Yard in 1855-57, Balch again went to sea in Plymouth to support a training cruise. He later served in the sloop Jamestown, joining her in December 1857 for a cruise in the West Indies before he traveled to Mare Island, California, for service in sloop-of-war St. Mary's. After a short cruise off the west coast of Central America between August 1858 and February 1859, Balch returned to the east coast via Panama.

=== American Civil War ===
Upon the outbreak of the Civil War in April 1861, Balch was ordered to Portsmouth, New Hampshire, where he helped put frigate Sabine in commission on 30 August. The ship-rigged sailing ship joined the Atlantic blockading squadron on 9 September. Sabine helped rescue 500 men from the chartered troop transport Governor during a storm on 2 November 1861. Balch then assumed command of steamer Pocahontas, leading a flotilla of boats during the Tybee Island landings on 26 December before cruising off the Carolina coast, to keep a watchful eye for Confederate raiders and blockade runners. He was promoted to Commander on 16 July 1862.

Given command of screw-sloop Pawnee at Philadelphia later that year, Balch coordinated the towing of ironclad Patapsco south to Port Royal, South Carolina, in February before joining the South Atlantic Squadron. There, the screw-sloop conducted coastal reconnaissance off the southern states, engaging shore batteries as required and watching for blockade runners. On 1 February and 18 June 1864, Pawnee assisted in the capture of Confederate steamers General Sumter and Hattie Brock respectively, seizing their valuable cargoes of cotton, turpentine, rosin and railroad iron. The warship also participated in the Stono River expedition in early July and Broad River expedition in November 1864. The following year, on 9 February 1865, Balch directed Pawnee up the Togoda Creek where, in company with side-wheel gunboat Sonoma and side-wheel steamer Daffodil, the warships destroyed three Confederate batteries near North Edisto, South Carolina. The ships then landed sailors and marines to occupy Georgetown on 23 February 1865, clearing the way for Union ships to supply Major-General Sherman's Army operating in the area. Balch was commended to the Navy Department by Rear Admiral John A. Dahlgren for his services during this operation.

=== Later career ===
After Pawnee decommissioned at Portsmouth on 26 July 1865, Balch received shore service at the Washington Navy Yard, where he was promoted to captain on 25 July 1866. He commanded the flagship Albany in the North Atlantic Squadron between 1868 and early 1870. Balch then returned to the Washington Navy Yard for duty with the Bureau of Navigation, where he was promoted to commodore on 13 August 1872.

He served as governor of the Philadelphia Naval Asylum, between 1873–76 before his appointment to the Light House Board in 1877–78. After a term as a member of the Board of Examiners in 1878, during which time Balch was promoted to rear admiral on 5 June 1878, Balch undertook a two-year assignment as Superintendent of the Naval Academy between 1879 and 1881. Balch then took command of the Pacific Squadron on 21 June 1881. That assignment lasted until he retired from the service in January 1883, taking up residence in Baltimore, Maryland. Because of his health, Balch spent the winter months with one of his daughters in Raleigh, North Carolina, where he died from pneumonia on 16 April 1908. He was interred at the United States Naval Academy Cemetery.

He was a member of the Loyal Legion and Military Order of Foreign Wars.

== Namesake ==
Two ships, USS Balch, have been named for him.

== See also ==
- List of superintendents of the United States Naval Academy

Academic offices
Preceded by Foxhall A. Parker, Jr.	Superintendent of United States Naval Academy; 1879–1881	Succeeded by Christopher R.P. Rodgers
