= Lucius Foote =

American diplomat (1826–1913)

Lucius Harwood Foote
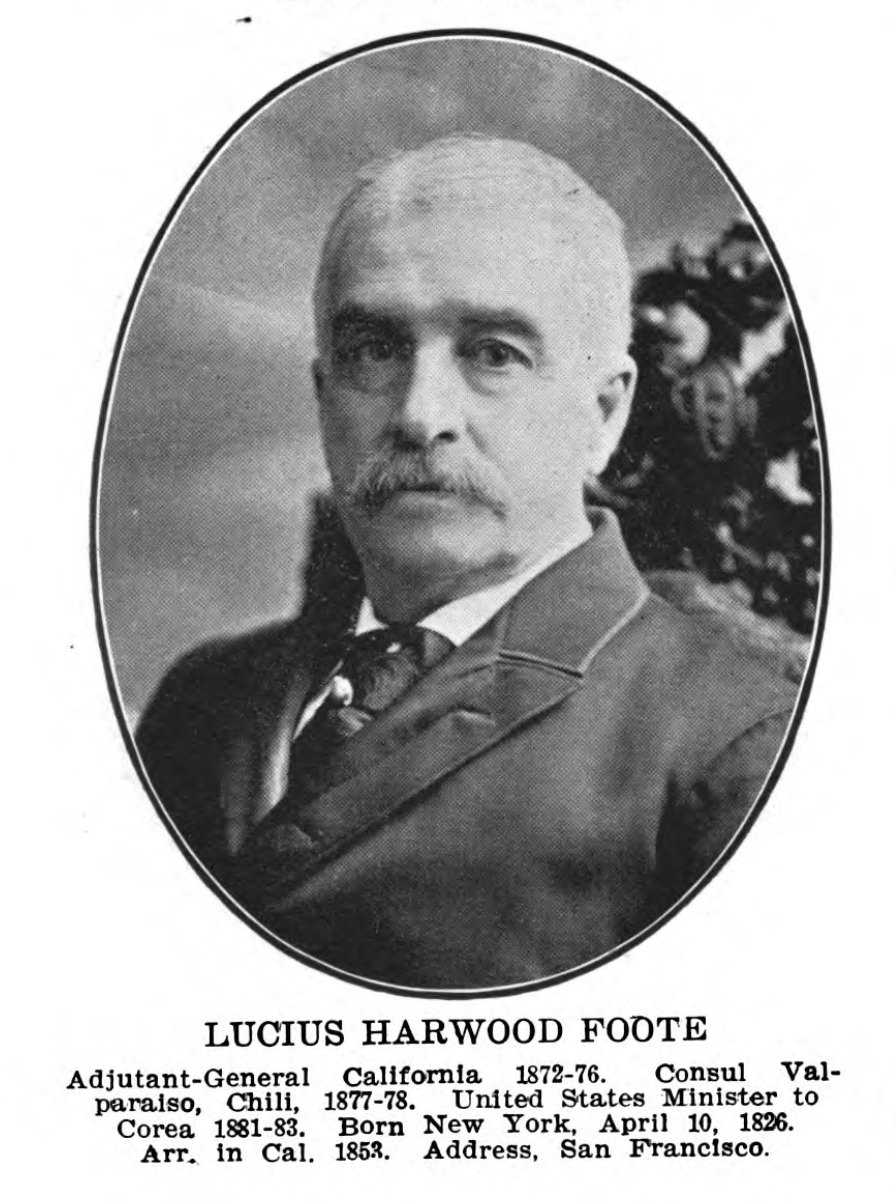

1st United States Minister to Korea
- In office May 20, 1883 – February 19, 1885
- President: Chester A. Arthur
- Preceded by: Diplomatic relations established
- Succeeded by: George Clayton Foulk, chargé d'affaires ad interim William Harwar Parker (as Consul General)

Personal details
- Born: April 10, 1826 Winfield, New York, U.S.
- Died: June 4, 1913 (aged 87) San Francisco, California, U.S.
- Spouse: Rose Frost Carter (m. 1862; died 1885)
- Relations: Lucius Foote (father) and Electa Harwood (mother)
- Profession: State militia officer and diplomat

Military service
- Allegiance: California; United States
- Branch/service: Californian Militia
- Years of service: 1871–1875
- Rank: Adjutant general

Lucius Harwood Foote (April 10, 1826 – June 4, 1913) was the first American minister to Korea and served from 1883 to 1885.

== Early life ==
Lucius Foote was born April 10, 1826, in Winfield, New York to Rev. Lucius Foote and Electa Harwood. He married in 1862 to Rose Frost Carter (d. 1885).

== Pre-Korea years ==
Lucius Foote was the Adjutant General of the California National Guard, from December 21, 1871 – December 13, 1875.

== U.S. ambassador to Korea ==
In May 1882, Korea and the United States signed a treaty of commerce, in Chemulpo Port (modern day Incheon). This treaty required an American political presence in Korea. Foote was assigned a year later, with the title, "Envoy Extraordinary and Minister Plenipotentiary". However, due to low trade volumes, in July 1884, Foote was demoted to the position of "Minister Resident". In August 1884, he purchased a hanok-style house from the Min family and thus established the American Legation. He shared the building with Horace Newton Allen. When Lucius Foote resigned and left Seoul, in January 1885, George Clayton Foulk replaced him.

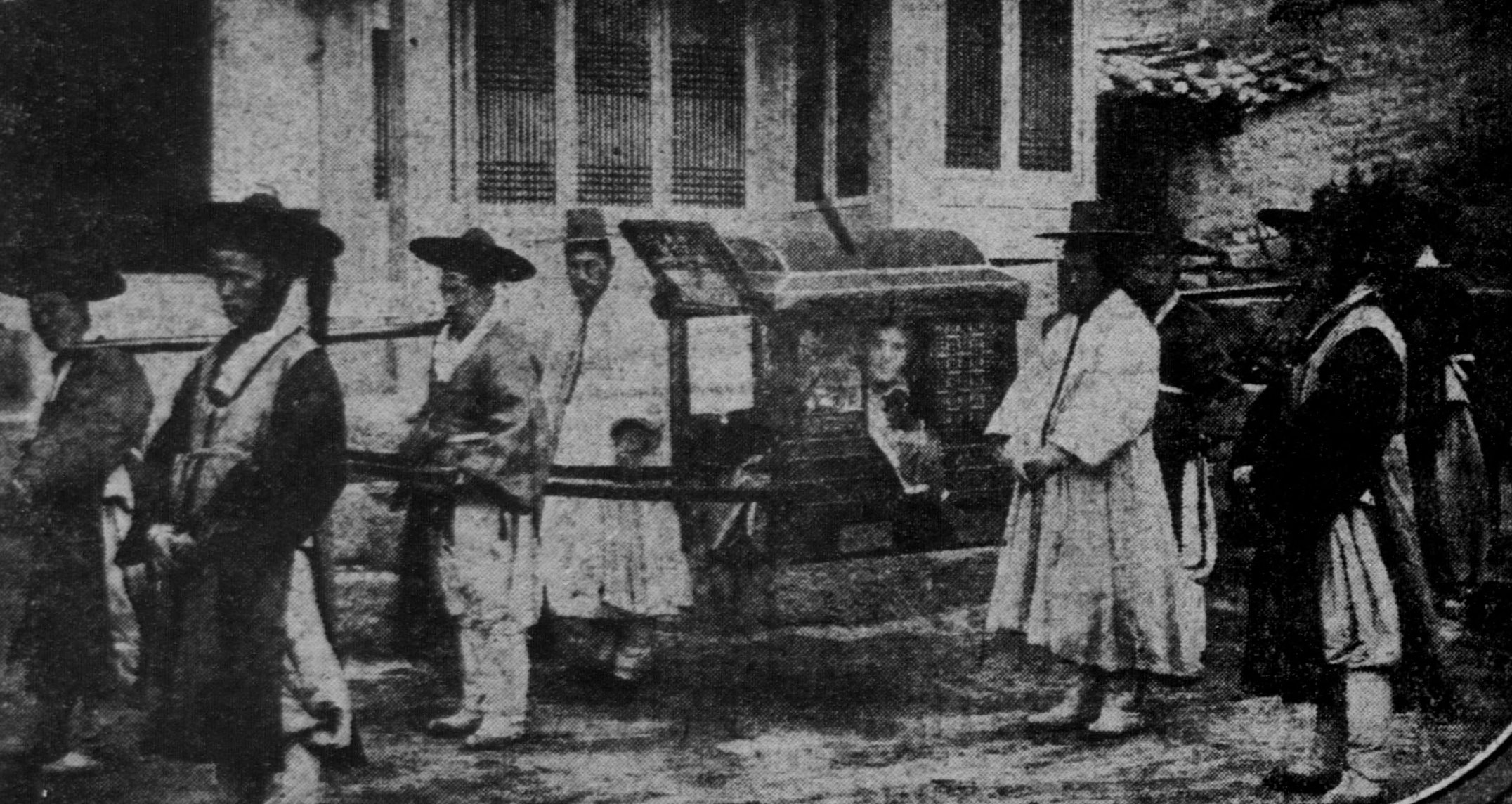
Rose, the spouse of Lucius Foote, in a palanquin in Korea

== Later years ==
Lucius Foote retired to San Francisco, California. He died there on June 4, 1913.
