= George Clayton Foulk =

American diplomat (1856–1893)

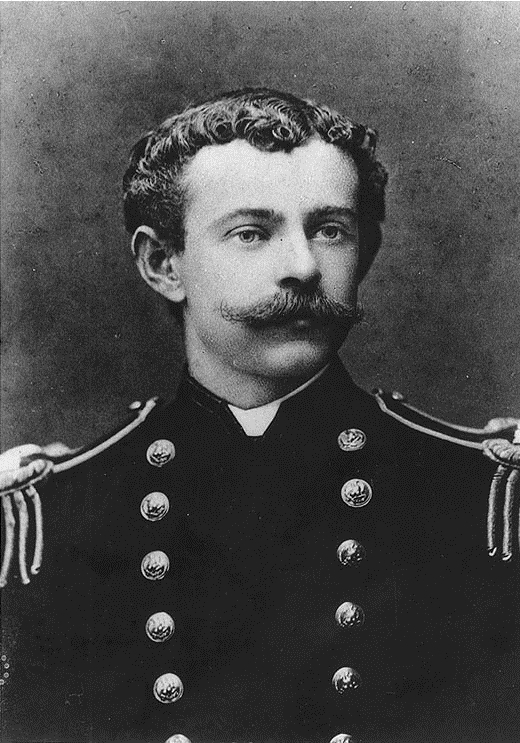
- George Clayton Foulk

United States Consul General to Korea Acting
- In office September 3, 1886 – April 13, 1887
- Preceded by: William Harwar Parker
- Succeeded by: Hugh A. Dinsmore
- In office February 19, 1885 – June 12, 1886
- Preceded by: Lucius Foote
- Succeeded by: William Harwar Parker

Personal details
- Born: October 30, 1856 Marietta, Pennsylvania, U.S.
- Died: August 6, 1893 (aged 36) Miyanoshita, Japan
- Cause of death: Heart failure
- Resting place: Nyakuoji Cemetery, Kyoto, Japan
- Spouse: Kane Murase
- Relations: Clayton Foulk (father) and Caroline Foulk (mother)
- Education: United States Naval Academy
- Profession: U.S. Navy officer, diplomat, teacher

Military service
- Allegiance: United States
- Branch/service: United States Navy
- Years of service: 1876–1886
- Rank: Ensign
- Unit: U.S. Naval Attaché

George Clayton Foulk (October 30, 1856 – 1893) was a United States Navy officer and U.S. Naval Attaché to the Kingdom of Korea in 1876. He also served as chargé d'affaires to the Kingdom of Korea in the absence of the American minister or consul.

== Early life ==
George Clayton Foulk was born in Marietta, Pennsylvania, son of Clayton and Caroline Foulk.

== U.S. naval career ==
George Foulk graduated, from the United States Naval Academy. Foulk went to Asia in 1876 on the ship Alert. He made a 427-mile journey through Japan, then returned to the United States over land, via Korea, Siberia, and Europe. Foulk became fluent in Japanese and Korean; when a Korean mission arrived, in 1883, he was the only person in Washington who could interpret between the two countries. He was appointed U.S. Naval Attaché to Korea and, after arriving there, embarked on two long journeys by sedan chair around the country. On the longer journey, which lasted 43 days, his visit included Gongju, Gwangju, Haeinsa, Busan, Daegu, and Mungyeong. A coup occurred in Seoul during the latter part of this journey and the Koreans' hospitality turned to hostility from those who took him to be a Japanese spy.

== U.S. envoy to the Kingdom of Korea ==
Foulk served as the acting chargé d'affaires to the Kingdom of Korea, from 1885 to 1886 and again, from 1886 to 1887. Soon after his relief by William Harwar Parker, Foulk was sent back to Korea after a report reached Washington, D.C. that Parker was a "chronic drunkard" who suffered from alcoholism. The United States government considered the situation so serious that a squadron of naval vessels was diverted to intercept Foulk's passenger liner and return him to Korea as soon as possible.

George Foulk was finally recalled several months later and relieved by Hugh A. Dinsmore with the U.S. acting at the behest of the Chinese government. The Chinese were unhappy with Foulk's attempts to build up Korea's ability to counteract Chinese and Japanese influence.

== Last years ==
After his recall, George Foulk became a teacher, at Doshisha College (now Doshisha University), in Kyoto, Japan. On September 7, 1887, he married a Japanese national, Murase Kane, with whom he had corresponded while in Korea.

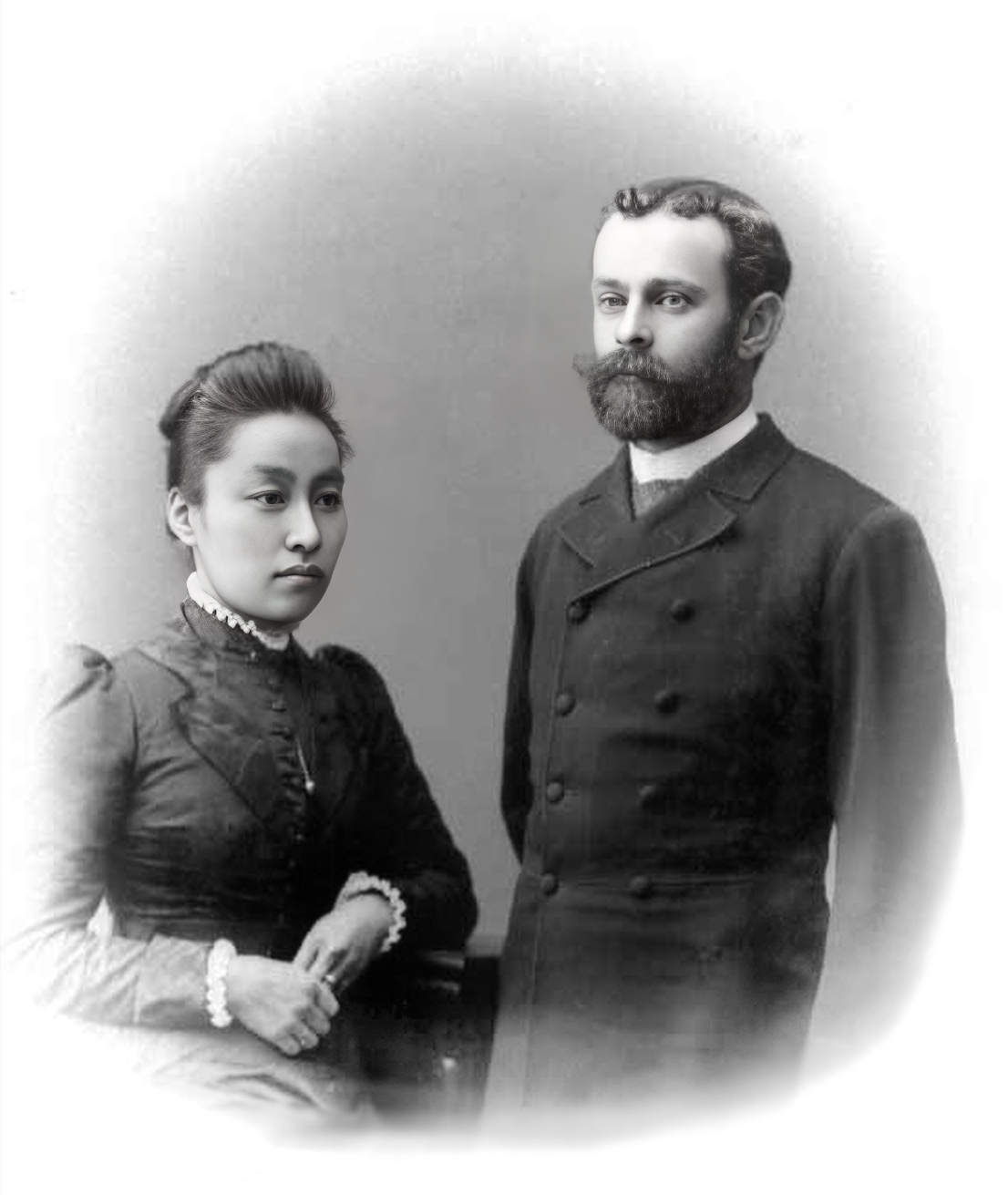
George Foulk with his spouse, Murase Kane

== Death ==
George Foulk went missing during a hike with his wife and friend Prof. Bell in Minoshita, Kanagawa on August 6, 1893. His body was found dead later the same day, with the cause of death being attributed to heart failure.

He and his wife are buried together in plot 137 of the Nyakuoji Cemetery, Kyoto.

Preceded by Lucius H. Foote; William Harwar Parker	Minister to the Kingdom of Korea; 1885 - 1886 (first term); 1886 - 1887 (second term)	Succeeded by William Harwar Parker; Hugh A. Dinsmore
