= USS Balch =

Two ships of the United States Navy have been named Balch, for Rear Admiral George Balch.

- USS Balch (DD-50), was commissioned in 1914 and decommissioned in 1922.
- USS Balch (DD-363), was commissioned in 1936 and decommissioned in 1945.
