= William Harwar Parker =

U.S. Navy officer (1826–1896)

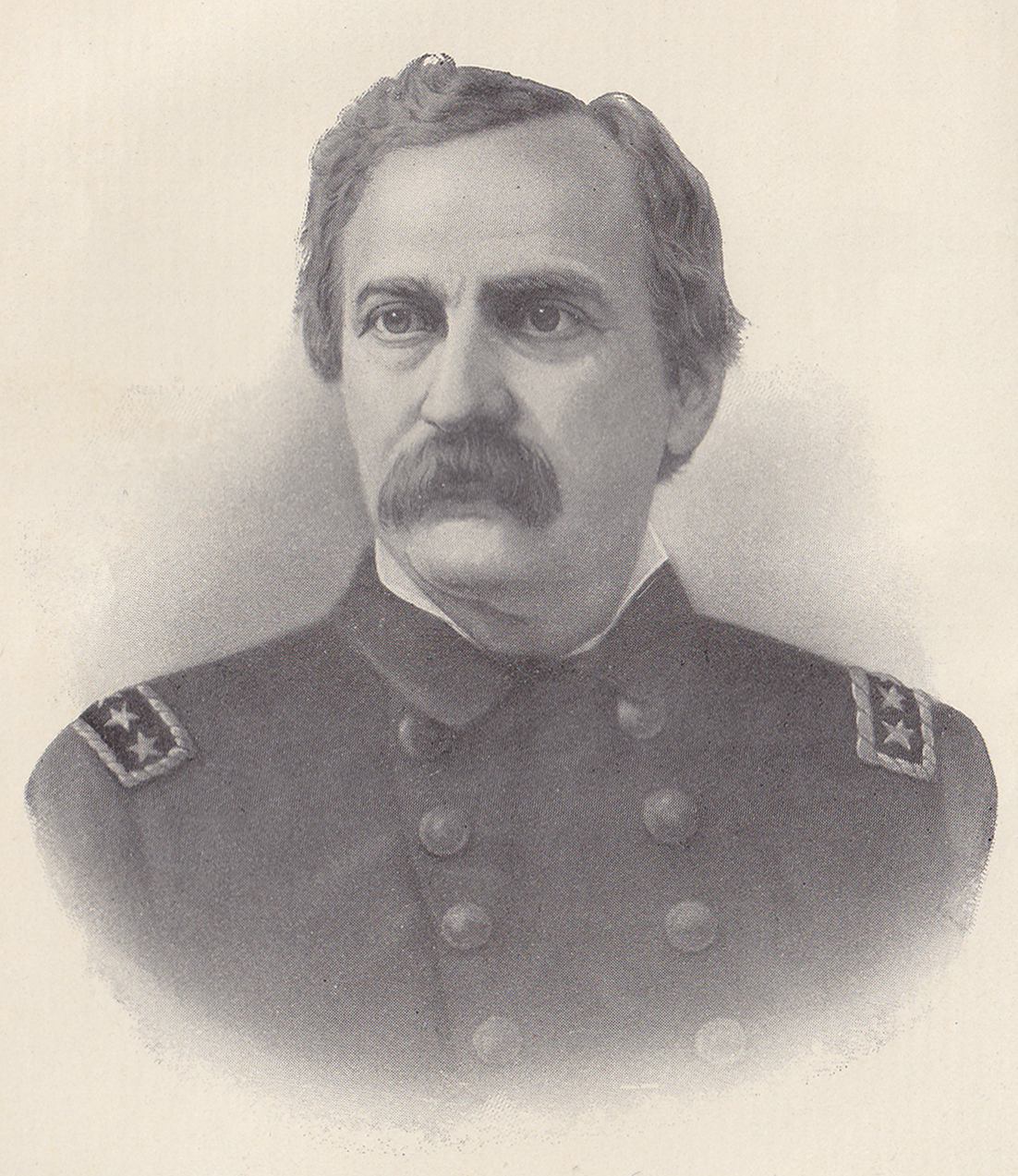
- Captain William Harwar Parker, during the American Civil War, in the Confederate States Navy

United States Consul General to Korea
- In office June 12, 1886 – September 3, 1886
- President: Grover Cleveland
- Preceded by: Lucius Foote
- Succeeded by: Hugh A. Dinsmore

Personal details
- Born: October 8, 1826 New York City, New York
- Died: December 30, 1896 (aged 70) Washington, D.C.
- Relations: Foxhall A. Parker, Sr. (father); Foxhall A. Parker, Jr. (brother)
- Awards: Civil War Campaign Medal

Military service
- Allegiance: United States; Confederate States
- Branch/service: United States Navy; Confederate States Navy
- Years of service: 1841–1861 (USN); 1861–1865 (CSN)
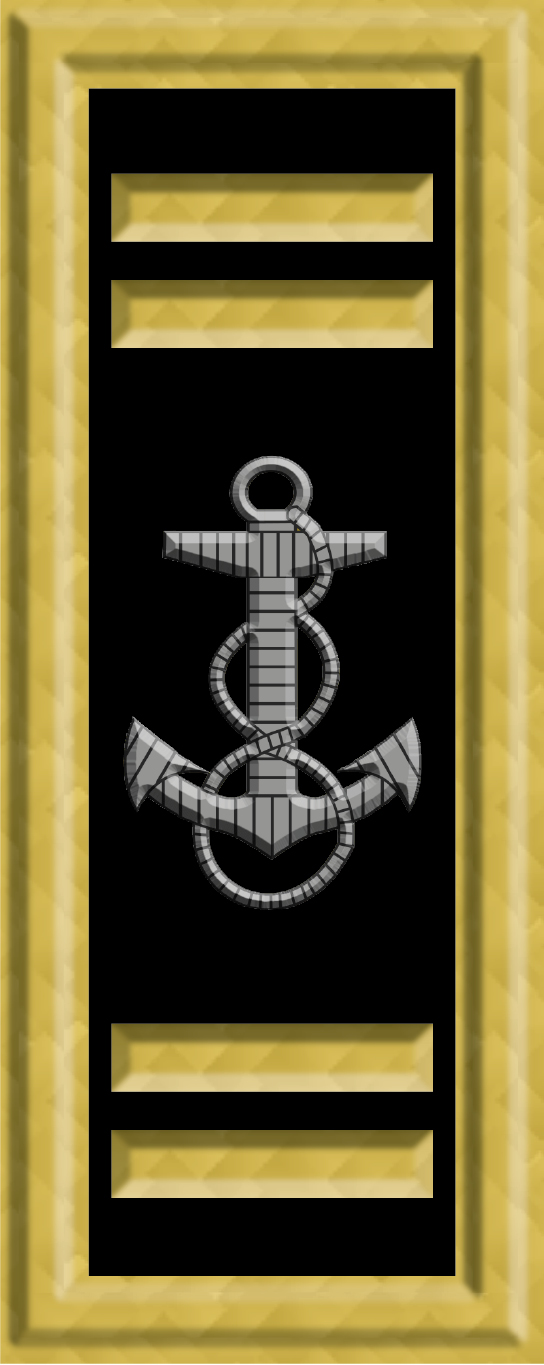
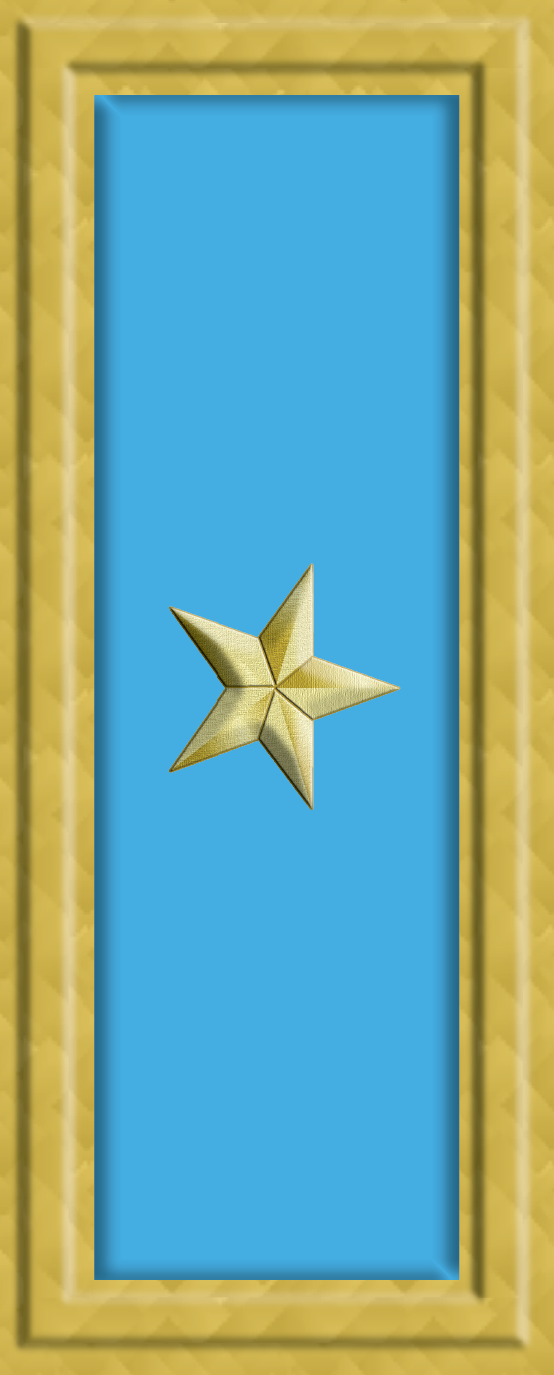
- Rank: Lieutenant Lieutenant
- Battles/wars: Mexican–American War: Battle of Palo Alto; Blockade of Veracruz; Siege of Veracruz; Second Battle of Tuxpan; Second Battle of Tabasco; African Slave Trade Patrol; American Civil War: Battle of Roanoke Island; Battle of Hampton Roads; Battle of Drewry's Bluff; Battle of Trent's Reach

William Harwar Parker (October 8, 1826 – December 30, 1896) was an officer in the United States Navy and later in the Confederate States Navy. His autobiography, entitled Recollections of a Naval Officer 1841–1865, provides a unique insight into the United States Navy of the mid-19th century during an era when the Age of Sail was coming to an end and the advent of steam power and ironclads was beginning.

== Early life and entrance to the Navy ==
He was born in New York City, the son of Commodore Foxhall A. Parker, Sr. and Sarah Jay Bogardus (b. 1794), daughter of Robert Bogardus (1771–1841). Commodore Foxhall A. Parker, Jr., was his brother.

William H. Parker became a United States Navy midshipman at the early age of 15, recalling in his biography that he had held his father's hand while being escorted to his first ship.

Parker's appointment date as a midshipman was on October 19, 1841, just after his 15th birthday. His first assignment was to the receiving ship USS North Carolina, and he reported on board October 27 when the ship was moored at New York City.

== Midshipman cruises ==
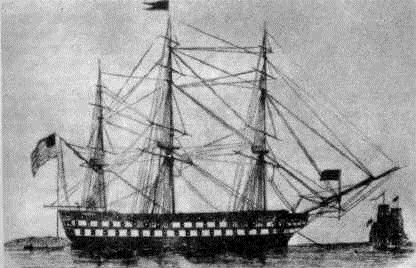
USS Columbus

In April 1842, Parker was issued his first sea orders and reported to USS Columbus. Columbus set sail on August 29, 1842, and proceeded to Gibraltar, arriving in the fall and spending the winter in that port. In the spring of 1842, Columbus sailed to the port of Mahón with a port call to Toulon. The ship then returned to Gibraltar and, in June 1843, set sail for Madeira and then on to Gata, Cape Verde. At the start of July 1843, Columbus made for Rio de Janeiro.

Columbus arrived at Rio de Janeiro on July 29, 1843, and spent two months in port before proceeding to Buenos Aires. It was in Buenos Aires that Parker personally met Juan Manuel de Rosas and quickly recognized him as a "cruel ruthless dictator".

In February 1844, Columbus returned to Rio de Janeiro and in March set sail for a return to the United States. The ship arrived in New York City in 1844 and put in lay-up. Parker was granted a three-month leave and then, in September 1844, reported to USS Potomac moored at Philadelphia. Potomac set sail in November 1844 for Norfolk and then onward to Port-au-Prince in Haiti. Arriving in December 1944, the ship then proceeded to Port Royal, Jamaica and then on to Havana. It was in Havana that Parker recalls his ship almost running aground due to heavy winds off of Morro Castle.

After spending the winter in Havana, Potomac set sail for the United States and arrived in Pensacola in February 1845. The United States was by this time preparing for the Mexican–American War, which, although yet undeclared, was already causing both the US and Mexico to mobilize troops. Parker states in his biography that he recalls seeing the 7th Infantry Regiment beginning to mass in Florida for the coming invasion of Mexico. In February 1845, Potomac sailed for Veracruz and for the rest of the summer practiced gunnery exercises off the coast of Mexico. In August 1845, the ship returned to Pensacola and then was sent north to Norfolk for major structural repairs. The ship arrived in Norfolk on December 20, 1845, and was put in lay-up with the bulk of the crew reassigned.

During his midshipman years, Parker also contracted yellow fever on two separate occasions. The first time was in the summer of 1846, and the second infection was in 1847. Parker's private observations of yellow fever was caused by the mosquito.

== Mexican–American War ==
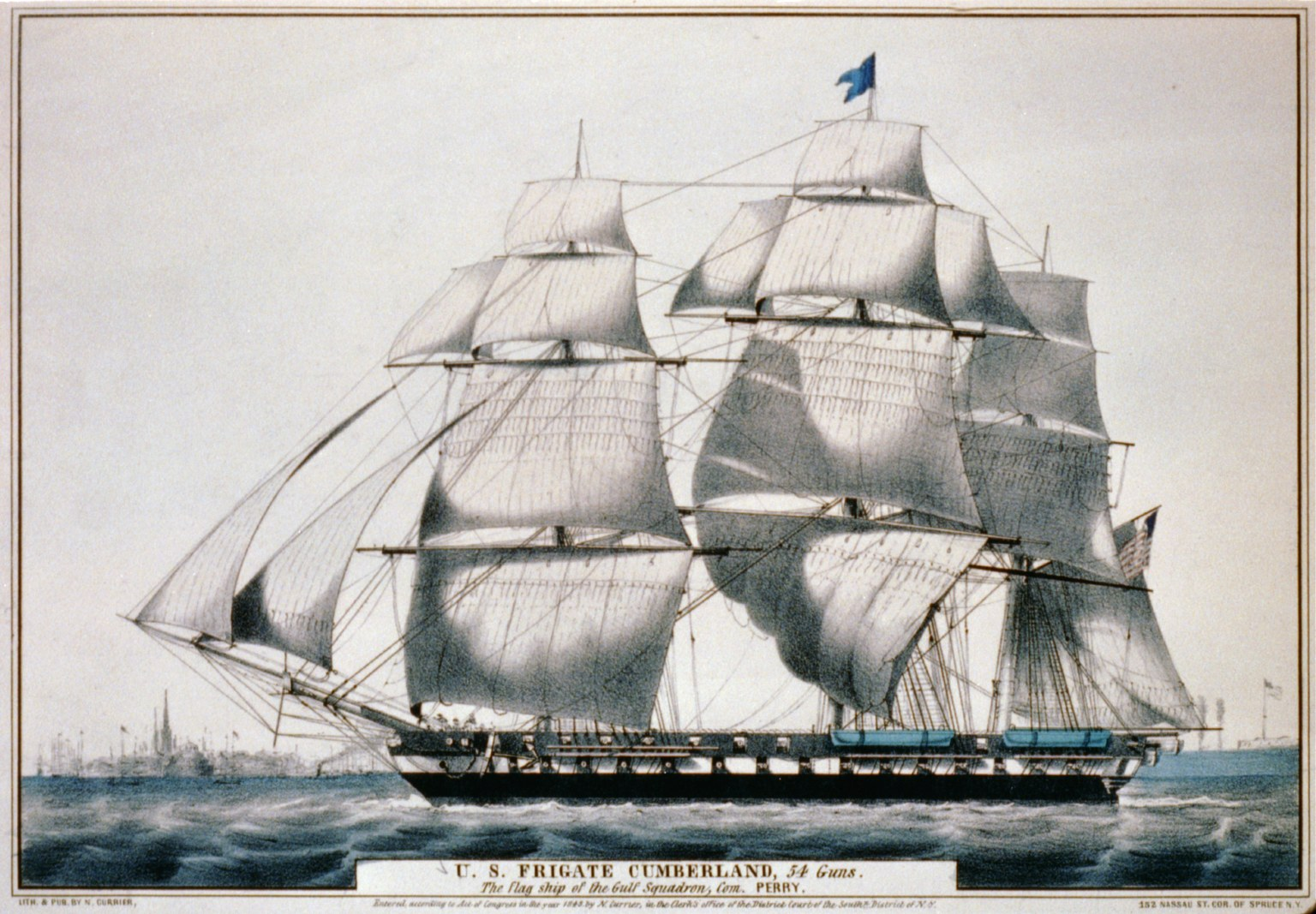
USS Cumberland, then flagship for the squadron encompassing USS Potomac

In February 1846, Parker applied to rejoin the crew of USS Potomac and was assigned as a midshipman under the command of Captain John H. Aulick. Parker served as Aulick's aide, and remarks in his biography indicate that the Captain was very stern with the crew.

Potomac sailed for Mexico in March 1846 and anchored off of Sacrificios Island (near Veracruz). The vessel was assigned to a larger blockade squadron under the command of Commodore David Conner. In May 1846, Potomac relocated to Brazos Santiago and put troops ashore at Point Isabel. It was here that Parker witnessed the Battle of Palo Alto with the assigned naval personnel manning batteries supporting the advancing troops of Winfield Scott.

Following the engagement at Palo Alto, Potomac returned to Veracruz and anchored off of Green Island, where it supported the blockade of Veracruz. It was during the blockage that Parker participated in his first actual combat engagement, this occurring when Parker was attached to a detail refilling ship's water flasks at the Antigua River. Attacked by a small force of the Mexican Army, Parker's detail, as well as a contingent of United States Marines, was able to repel the Mexicans and withdraw with few casualties. The engagement was considered insignificant in the overall scheme of the Mexican War, but did cause the U.S. Navy to contract for water shipped in from Texas rather than attempt foraging operations off the Mexican shoreline.

In late 1846, Potomac became part of the large naval force preparing for the all out invasion of Veracruz. As the fleet gathered some 12 miles (19 km) to the southeast of Veracruz, Parker witnessed the grounding of the fleet flagship, USS Cumberland. Cumberland was then rotated out of action to be replaced by USS Raritan. Parker recalls in his biography that one of the ranking squadron commanders at the time (Matthew C. Perry) blamed the grounding on Commodore David Conner, but Conner was not relieved of his command, but rather simply transferred his flag to Raritan.

On February 24, 1847, shortly after the Battle of Buena Vista, the U.S. Navy began to offload the first elements of the 4th Infantry Regiment. The main offload of the entire American invasion force then began on March 9. During this period, Parker met and conversed with both then Lieutenant Ulysses S. Grant and Captain Joseph E. Johnston.

The Battle of Veracruz began on March 22, 1847. The day before, the squadron to which Potomac was assigned had shifted to the command of Commodore Matthew Perry. On March 23, Perry ordered several naval units ashore to set up shore batteries. Parker was assigned to the shore battery from Potomac with all batteries under the overall command of Captain Alexander Slidell Mackenzie. The Army liaison officer to the Naval Shore Battery was Captain Robert E. Lee.

During the bombardment of Veracruz, Parker was slightly wounded when a bullet grazed his knee and also witnessed his first close quarters casualty when a gunner a few feet away was decapitated by an enemy round shot. Parker also witnessed extreme bravery from a fellow midshipman, Charles M. Fauntleroy, who would later become an important officer in the Confederate Army.

After Veracruz surrendered less than a week later, Parker returned aboard Potomac, which then proceeded to anchor off of a fortress overlooking Veracruz. At the start of June 1847, Potomac departed, under the command of Commodore Perry aboard USS Spitfire, to capture the region of Alvarado. Arriving to find the town already surrendered to Lieutenant Charles G. Hunter, Perry had Hunter reprimanded for acting without authority, even though the town had surrendered without firing a shot (it was later revealed that Perry had hoped to occupy the town in force and capture all of the livestock and supplies).

Perry then led his squadron on to capture Tuspan and from there planned what became known as the Tabasco Expedition. On June 16, 1847, Parker was transferred to USS Raritan in order to participate in the expedition and volunteered to serve in a formation of naval pioneers being sent ashore to capture Tabasco. Again arriving to find the town already surrendered to a pair of steam gunboats, Parker returned to Raritan, which then set sail for Norfolk, Virginia.

Raritan arrived at Norfolk in late July 1847 and, for Parker at least, the Mexican War was over. The conflict on the Gulf Coast came to an effective end when Mexico City fell in September 1847, and a peace treaty was signed the next year in February 1848.

== Naval Academy and Africa service ==
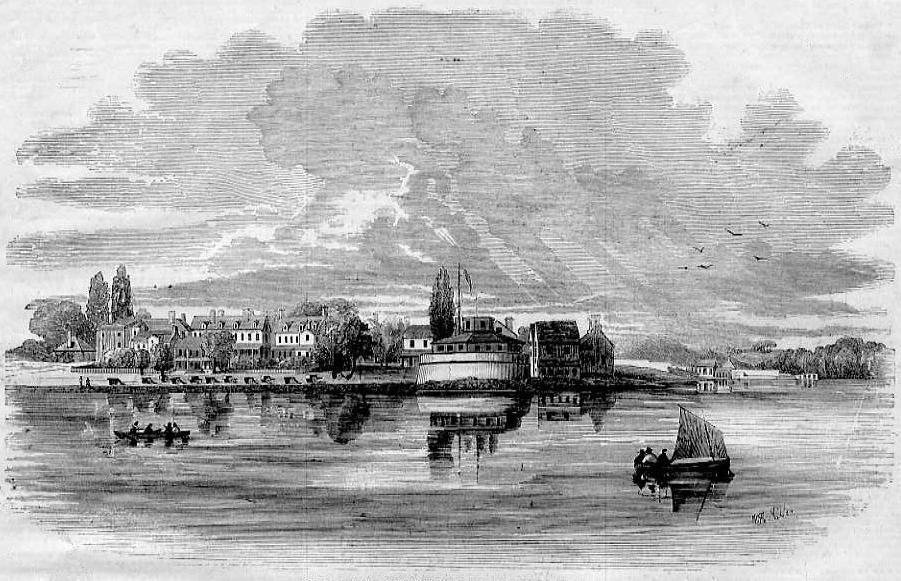
The U.S. Naval Academy in the 1850s, a decade after Parker spent less than year there as a student.

In August 1847, Parker was detached from USS Raritan and placed on leave; he spent the time visiting his father in Boston before reporting to the United States Naval Academy in September. The school then being just a few years old, and most of the students coming from at-sea assignments, Parker was placed in an advanced curriculum with graduation scheduled for the next summer.

The Superintendent of the Naval Academy was in those days Commander George P. Upshur, and Parker's primary instructor in naval warfare was Lieutenant John A. Dahlgren (who would later become a rear admiral). During Parker's few months at the Academy, he also witnessed two duels, one of which was fought on the traditional dueling ground of Bladensburg and the other which was fought on the Academy grounds itself. Dueling was by then illegal, and those involved were dismissed from the Academy by direct order of President James Polk; Zachary Taylor overturned two of the dismissals three years later.

On July 1, 1848, Parker was declared a graduate of the Naval Academy after passing a board of examination and declared a Passed Midshipman. In August 1848, Parker received orders to USS Constitution but requested a change of orders to the sloop of war USS Yorktown, which was then slated to perform anti-slave trade duties in African waters. Parker reported to Yorktown in September, and the ship set sail for Africa on November 22, 1848. Parker recalls in his biography that the voyage was over some very rough seas and, for one of the few times in his entire naval career, Parker became violently seasick. In December 1848, Yorktown arrived at Madeira and then sailed on the Cape Verde. The rest of the month was spent at the cape, and then, in January 1849, Yorktown sailed to Porto Praya (now Praia). It was here that several of the Yorktown officers rotated off the ship and Parker was made Acting Master.

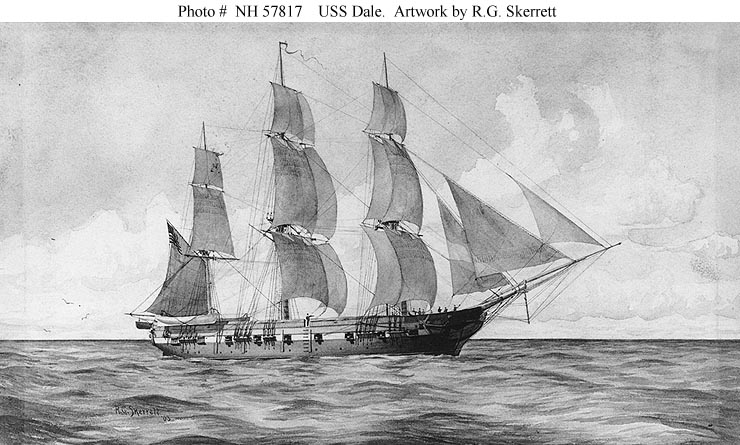
The sloop of war USS Dale, similar in design to Yorktown.

Yorktown then sailed to Bathurst, off the Gambia River, where the ship put in for repairs to her rudder. In February 1849, Yorktown sailed to Liberia, where she participated as an observer in a Liberian attack against several native tribes living in the interior jungle. It was here that Parker met the President of Liberia (Joseph Jenkins Roberts) who traveled as a guest of honor on board Yorktown. Yorktown moored at Monrovia in November 1849 and spent the winter in this port. In January 1850, Yorktown sailed for Cape Palmas and then on to several port calls in the Gulf of Guinea. These included the ports of Accra, Elmina, and Cape Coast Castle. In February 1850, Yorktown headed for Ouidah, which was then in the Kingdom of Dahomey. Along the way, Yorktown met up with both the British brig HMS Contest under the command of Archibald McMurdo and USS Perry, which was then under the command of Captain Andrew H. Foote.

In June 1850, Yorktown made ready for its return to Porto Praya. The ship moored at Funchal on July 1, and it was here that the ship celebrated Independence Day. The ship then continued to Porto Praya and then, on August 1, sailed for the Canary Islands. Parker remarks in his biography that the ship's crew was in very high spirits at this point, having completed a deployment to Africa with only two deaths, both to a sickness which Parker called "African fever". On August 30, 1850, Yorktown moored at Las Palmas then continued on towards the port of Boa Vista and the island of St. Jago. On September 4, the ship sailed toward Mayo (now Maio) Island and, on September 6, 1850, struck a reef. Over the course of two days, the ship capsized and was lost, but the crew was able to offload most of the supplies and suffered no casualties.

The crew of USS Yorktown lived on Mayo Island for over a month, during which time Parker recalls that relaxation was the norm, and the crew did little more than "relax and play in donkey races". On October 8, USS Dale arrived to pick up the crew, and they were transferred to USS Portsmouth, which sailed for Norfolk, arriving in December 1850.

== The 1850s ==
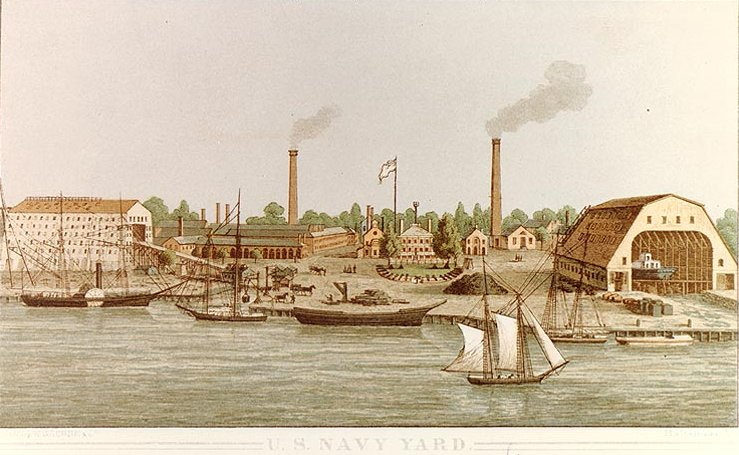
The Washington Navy Yard in the mid 19th century

In the summer of 1851, Parker spent three months on leave and then reported to USS Washington, which was then assigned to perform coastal survey duties. For the remainder of the summer, Parker sailed with the Washington along the Nantucket Shoals, surveying such areas as Block Island and the so-called "No man's land". The cruise of Washington ended in October 1851 when the ship sailed to New York City for a lay-up. The crew was discharged and reassigned, and Parker reported to the Washington Navy Yard for administrative duties.

In the spring of 1852, Parker was ordered to proceed to Boston, where he had orders to report aboard USS Princeton, which was the first propeller-driven ship in the United States Navy. Reporting to the vessel, and foreseeing it as a "dismal failure", Parker applied for a transfer to a regular sail ship. Parker's feelings were somewhat prophetic, since Princeton would in fact suffer a major accident several months later when one of its guns exploded and killed several high-ranking dignitaries who were then on board.

Parker reported aboard USS Cyane in July 1852, the ship then being under the command of George N. Hollins. In the weeks leading up to vessel making sail, Parker lived in Boston and had the chance to meet one of the leading mystics of the time, Margaret Fox. Fox attempted to talk Parker into giving up the Navy for a career as a psychic, but Parker amusingly declined the offer.

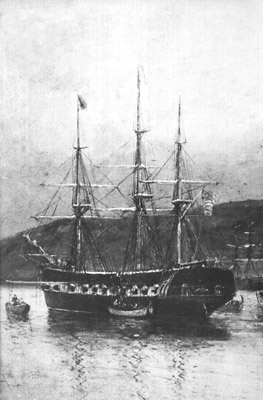
USS Cyane

In August 1852, Cyane sailed for Havana and nearly went aground near the Abaco Islands due to, what Parker believed, was incompetence on the part of the ship's sailing master. The ship then made port in Havana before sailing for Pensacola for supplies and provisions. In Pensacola, the ship found orders to return to Havana and, on this trip, the vessel was not as lucky and did ground itself near to Bahia Honda. As a result, the sailing master was transferred and Parker become Acting Master of Cyane. When the ship transferred one of its lieutenants only a few days later, Parker was appointed an Acting Lieutenant. During this same period, Parker met the Vice President of the United States (William R. King), who was then traveling aboard USS Fulton.

Cyane next sailed for Key West, where it put in for "decontamination" due to a major rat infestation. Spending the winter in Key West, the ship sailed for Greytown, on the Mosquito Coast, in the spring of 1853. Here, Cyane spent 70 days safeguarding American steamer companies which were operating in an area frequented by pirates as well as hostile townspeople living in Greystown (this town would be bombarded and destroyed in 1854 after holding the United States Ambassador to Nicaragua hostage for several days).

Towards the end of the summer, Cyane departed Greytown and proceeded to Pensacola for supplies then headed north to Portsmouth, New Hampshire. The vessel was placed under the overall command of Commodore W. B. Shubrick and was then assigned to fishery guarding duties. To this end, the ship sailed for Eastport, Maine and then on to Saint John, New Brunswick. By the fall of 1853, Cyane had made a tour of the Bay of Fundy, the Straights of Canso and had made its way into the Gulf of Saint Lawrence. Ending its tour in September, Cyane returned to New Hampshire and then proceeded to Philadelphia for layup and refit. In October 1853, Parker was detached and proceeded to the Naval Academy for duty as an instructor.

Parker served as an instructor at the United States Naval Academy from October 1853 until the fall of 1857. From 1853 to 1855 he was an Assistant Professor of Mathematics and in 1855 become a Professor of Navigation and Astronomy. In December 1853, Parker married Margaret Griffin, and the two would remain married until Parker's death, but the couple never had any children.

During the summer of 1855, Parker participated as an instructor on a midshipman training cruise as part of his duties as a Naval Academy instructor. The ship, USS Preble, visited the ports of Eastport, Cape Cod, Portland, and Boston before returning to Annapolis in the fall. In September 1855, Parker was also promoted to the permanent rank of lieutenant in the United States Navy.

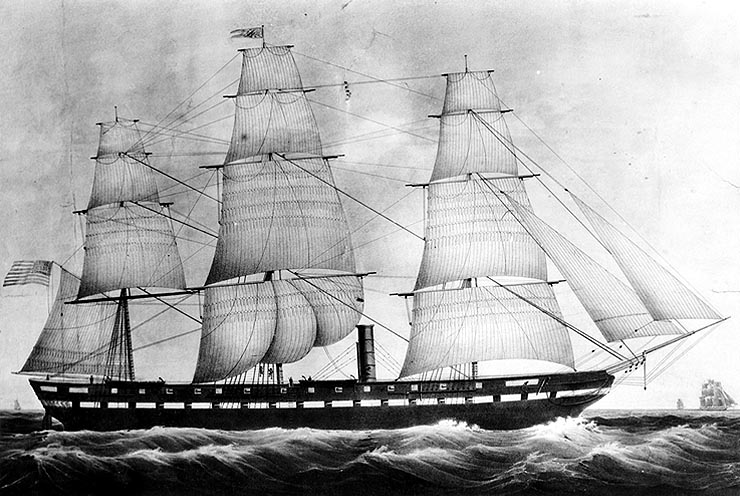
USS Merrimack

In the fall of 1857, Parker was detached from the Naval Academy and reported aboard USS Merrimack, which was then under the command of Commander Robert B. Hitchcock. On October 17, 1857, Merrimack sailed from Boston on a mission to the United States Minister to Brazil (Richard Kidder Meade) to his new assignment. The ship made port in Rio de Janeiro in December 1957 and then proceeded to round Cape Horn to enter the Pacific Ocean at the start of the new year.

In February 1858, Merrimack made port in Talcahuano, Chile, and from there sailed to the Chincha Islands. At the end of February, the ship put into port in the small coastal town of Callao with shore leave authorized for the crew. Parker took the opportunity to travel to Lima, where he witnessed "some type of revolution" which was underway under the leadership of Lizardo Montero Flores.

In March 1858, Merrimack sailed for Panama, where Parker had the foresight to predict that a Panama Canal would one day be constructed. After a layover at Perico Island, Merrimack headed into the open Pacific Ocean, reaching the Sandwich Islands (now Hawaii) in September 1858. The ship remained in Honolulu until October and then set course for a return to Central America.

In December 1858, Merrimack arrived at El Realejo, Nicaragua, and remained in this port for a total of three months, during which time Parker met the President of Nicaragua. In March, the ship then returned from Panama, where it was placed under a new squadron commander, Commodore John B. Montgomery; the ship then headed to Valparaíso, arriving in June 1859, and remained at this station until October when Merrimack was relieved by USS Lancaster. The ship then set a return course for the United States, stopping in Rio de Janeiro in November. It was at this time that the crew was informed of the John Brown Raid and, according to Parker's biography, he had already come to the conclusion that civil war between the North and South was inevitable.

In December 1859, Merrimack reached Norfolk, and the vessel was laid up for an overhaul and the crew discharged. During the voyage, Parker had written a naval guide entitled Instructions for Naval Light Artillery (New York, 1862) and had translated a French instruction, entitled Tactique Navale, into English.

== Virginia State Navy and Confederate States Navy ==
As the United States broke up in 1861, the Parker brothers followed separate paths. Foxhall A. Parker, Jr., remained in the U.S. Navy, while William "went south" to join the Virginia State Navy and, in June 1861, the Confederate States Navy. He commanded the gunboat CSS Beaufort into 1862, taking part in the Roanoke Island battle on February 7–8, 1862 and the actions in Hampton Roads on March 8 and March 9, 1862. In mid-May, he served at Drewry's Bluff when the batteries there were attacked by Union warships.

After several months' shore duty, First Lieutenant Parker was sent to Charleston, South Carolina, where he was executive officer of the ironclad CSS Palmetto State and participated in her attack on Union blockaders in January 1863. In October 1863, he became superintendent of the Confederate States Naval Academy, based on board CSS Patrick Henry in the James River, Virginia. He also commanded the ironclad CSS Richmond. In April 1865, as the Confederate capital at Richmond, Virginia was evacuated, he led the Naval Academy's midshipmen as a guard for their failing Government's archives and treasury.

== Post-war activities ==
Following the end of the American Civil War, William H. Parker was captain of a Pacific Mail steamship and then served as president of Maryland Agricultural College (later known as the University of Maryland at College Park). Parker attempted to institute a Naval Cadet Corps in much the same manner as some other private colleges had done with Army styled groups (see Virginia Tech Corps of Cadets as an example). When the school began dropping in its enrollment, and after Parker attempted to have the name of the college changed, he was asked to resign, which he did reluctantly in 1882.

The following summer, Parker was shot in the head by the Apaches. He survived but lost his sight in one eye. The ball was too near his brain for doctors to remove it, so it remained with him the rest of his life. In October 1882 he married Nettie T. Jenkins, the daughter of Admiral Thornton Jenkins at his home, where both Parker and Jenkins would later die.

In his later years, Parker suffered from alcoholism, but this did not prevent his being appointed the Minister to Korea (the predecessor title to the United States Ambassador to Korea) in June 1886. Recognized as a "hopeless drunkard" by the chargé d'affaires, George Clayton Foulk, Parker was relieved of his position less than a year later. Parker returned to live in Washington, D.C., where he enjoyed retirement and focused on writing.

== Death ==
Parker died suddenly, at the age of 70, on December 30, 1896.

== Naval service record ==
Over a career which lasted 24 years, Parker served in three different navies (the United States Navy, Virginia State Navy, and the Confederate Navy) and he performed duty on several different naval vessels of various types and sizes. The largest of these was the 74-gun warship USS North Carolina, and the smallest was the 85-foot gunboat, CSS Beaufort.

Shore assignments included three tours at the United States Naval Academy (one as a student and two as an instructor), administrative duty in the Washington Navy Yard, and various detached duties in the first months of the American Civil War serving as a navy officer attached to various Confederate Army installations. Parker's last assignment was as the Commander of the Confederate Naval Academy.

Since Parker's service was before the creation of any significant military awards, his only official decorations are a commendation from the United States Secretary of State, for diplomatic actions in the 1850s, and the thanks of the Confederate Congress for gun fire support during the Battle of Roanoke Island. His service in the civil war also grants him entitlement to the Civil War Campaign Medal, but this decoration was created after Parker's death.

Parker's highest permanent rank, in all of the navies with which he served, was that of lieutenant. While commanding Beaufort, however, photographic evidence indicates Parker wore the insignia of a commander and, while head of the Confederate Naval Academy, was referred to as a captain. Thus, for practical purposes, Parker's highest rank on active duty was that of captain.

=== Pre-Civil War service history ===
Date	Rank	Component	Vessel	Class	Port Call/Engagement	Age
19 Oct 1841	Midshipman	USN	Initial Appointment	---	---	15
27 Oct 1841	---	USN	USS North Carolina	74 gun warship	New York City	---
Apr 1842	---	USN	USS Columbus	74 gun warship	Mahón, Toulon, Gibraltar	---
Jun 1843	---	---	---	---	Madeira, Cape Verde	16
29 Jul 1843	---	---	---	---	Rio de Janeiro	---
Feb 1844	---	---	---	---	Buenos Aires, Rio de Janeiro	17
Sep 1844	---	USN	USS Potomac	42 gun frigate	New York City	---
Nov 1844	---	---	---	---	Norfolk, Port-au-Prince, Port Royal	18
Feb 1845	---	---	---	---	Pensacola, Veracruz	---
20 Dec 1845	---	---	---	---	Norfolk	19
May 1846	---	---	---	---	Veracruz, Point Isabel	---
24 Feb 1847	---	---	---	---	Veracruz, Alvarado	20
16 Jun 1847	---	USN	USS Raritan	42 gun frigate	Tabasco	---
1 Jul 1847	---	---	---	---	Havana, Norfolk	---
Sep 1847	---	USN	United States Naval Academy	Student	Annapolis	---
Aug 1848	Passed Midshipman	USN	USS Yorktown	16 gun sloop	Madeira, Cape Verde	21
Jan 1849	Passed Midshipman (Acting Master)	---	---	---	Porto Praya, Banjul	22
Nov 1849	---	---	---	---	Liberia, Monrovid	23
Jan 1850	---	---	---	---	Cape Palmas, Accra, Elmina, Cape Coast Castle	---
Feb 1850	---	---	---	---	Whydah	---
Jun 1850	---	---	---	---	Funchal	---
Aug 1850	---	---	---	---	Las Palmas, Boa Vista, (shipwrecked)	---
Jul 1851	Passed Midshipman	USN	USS Washington	1 gun brig	Nantucket, Block Island	24
Oct 1851	---	USN	Washington Navy Yard	Administrative Duty	Washington, D.C.	25
Jul 1852	---	USN	USS Cyane	18 gun sloop	Havana, Pensacola	---
Aug 1852	Passed Midshipman (Acting Lieutenant)	---	---	---	Havana, Key West	---
Apr 1853	---	---	---	---	Greytown	26
Aug 1853	---	---	---	---	Portsmouth, Eastport, St. John	---
Sep 1853	---	---	---	---	Bay of Fundy, Gulf of Saint Lawrence	---
Oct 1853	Passed Midshipman	USN	United States Naval Academy	Instructor	Annapolis	27
Jun 1855	---	USN	USS Preble	16 gun sloop	Eastport Portland, Cape Cod, Boston	28
Sep 1855	Lieutenant	USN	United States Naval Academy	Instructor	Annapolis	---
Sep 1857	---	USN	USS Merrimack	40 gun frigate	Rio de Janeiro, Talcahuano, Chincha Islands, Callao, Sandwich Islands, Panama, El Realejo, Valparaíso	30
Dec 1859	---	USN	United States Naval Academy	Instructor	Annapolis	32

=== Cruise Maps ===
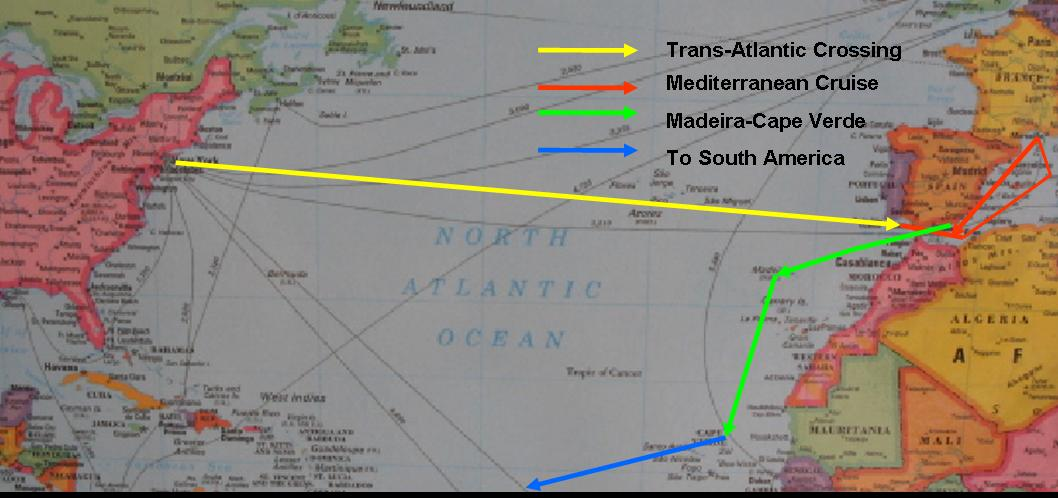
Cruise of the USS Columbus to Europe and South America (1842–1843)

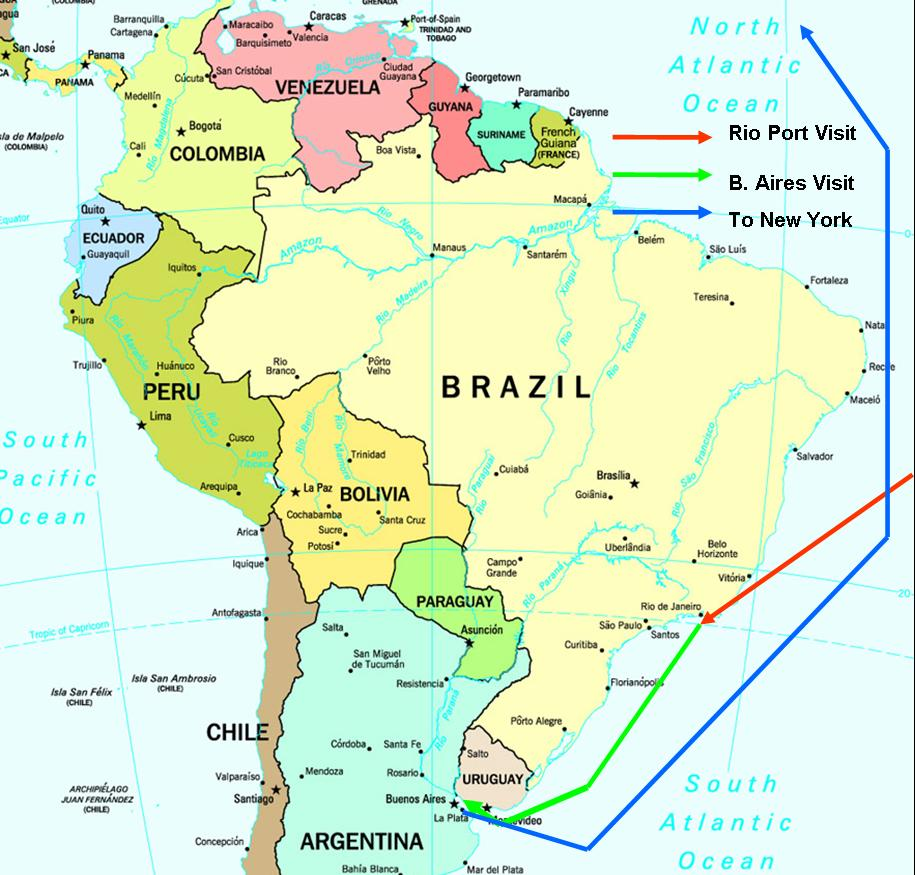
Cruise of the USS Columbus to South America (1843–1844)

== Notes ==
Preceded by none	Commander of the CSS Beaufort; 1862	Succeeded by William Sharp

Preceded by George Clayton Foulk	Minister to the Kingdom of Korea; 1886	Succeeded by George Clayton Foulk
