= USS Parker (DD-604) =

Benson-class destroyer

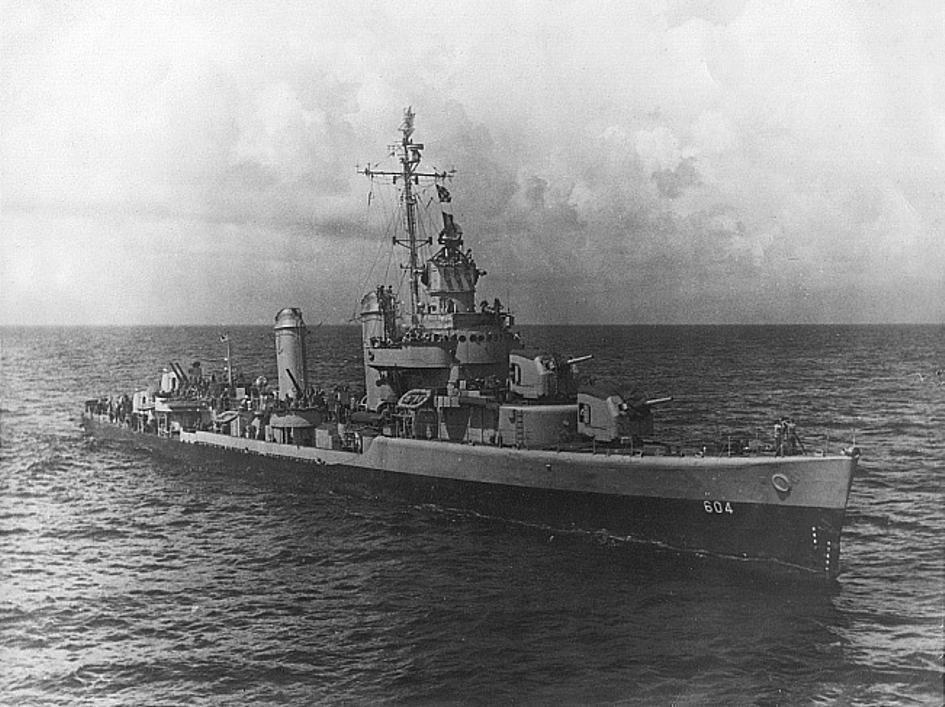
- USS Parker (DD-604) at sea, circa 1942

History

United States
- Name: USS Parker (DD-604)
- Namesake: Foxhall A. Parker, Jr.
- Builder: Bethlehem Mariners Harbor, Staten Island
- Laid down: 9 June 1941
- Launched: 12 May 1942
- Commissioned: 31 August 1942
- Decommissioned: 31 January 1947
- Stricken: 1 July 1971
- Nickname(s): "The Punchy P"
- Fate: Sold for scrap, 1973

General characteristics
- Class & type: Benson-class destroyer
- Displacement: 1,620 tons
- Length: 348 ft (106 m)
- Beam: 36 ft (11 m)
- Draught: 13 ft 4 in (4.06 m)
- Speed: 36 kn (67 km/h)
- Complement: 276
- Armament: 4 x 5 in (130 mm)/38 guns, 2 x 40 mm, 10 x 21" (533 mm) tt., 1 dct., 1 dcp. (hh.)
- Aircraft carried: 1

USS Parker (DD-604) was a Benson-class destroyer in the United States Navy during World War II. She was the second ship named for Foxhall A. Parker, Jr.

Parker was laid down 9 June 1941 by the Bethlehem Steel Corporation, Staten Island, New York; launched 12 May 1942; sponsored by Mrs. Edward Lloyd Winder; and commissioned 31 August 1942.

== 1942-1943 ==
After her shakedown cruise along the East Coast and in Cuban waters, Parker served as a convoy escort to North Africa, participating in the attack on Mehedia and Port Lyautey 7 November 1942. Following her return to the Atlantic Coast, Parker escorted convoys to North African ports on five occasions. On the fourth, she supported the Sicilian invasion 5–13 July 1943. Convoy escort duty to the United Kingdom and the Mediterranean Sea followed. On 6 November, when 30 planes attacked her convoy, Parker shot fifteen down.

== 1944, including Operation Anvil ==
From 7 February to 2 April 1944, the ship trained near Casco Bay, Maine, and from 3 to 11 April was on submarine patrol with Task Unit 27.6.1.

On 21 April Parker departed New York for the Mediterranean arriving at Mers-el-Kebir, Algeria 2 May. From 12 to 15 May she steamed to Naples. The ship operated between the Anzio beachhead and Naples from 17 May to 4 June, bombarding the shore in the Ardea sector 31 May–1 June. From 13 June to 9 August, Parker operated from Leghorn to Palermo (Sicily) bombarding positions on the shore and escorting convoys.

From 13 August to 17 August Parker took part in the invasion of southern France, delivering shore bombardment and anti-aircraft fire support. She then escorted a convoy from Cap Camarat, France, to Naples, arriving 21 August. On 31 August, with Destroyer Squadron 16, she departed Naples for home via Mers-el-Kebir, Algeria, and arrived New York 14 September.

== 1945, including transfer to Pacific and home ==
After repairs at Charlestown, Massachusetts, and training at Casco Bay, Parker arrived Norfolk, Virginia, 11 November. Two days later she sailed for the Mediterranean. Arriving Naples 26 November, she departed 1 December escorting a convoy back to New York. On 6 January 1945 Parker departed Norfolk with Task Group 62.1 screening a convoy to Oran, Algeria, 17 January. In ensuing weeks she operated in the Mediterranean and patrolled off Gibraltar. In March she supported Allied forces on the Franco-Italian and western Italian fronts, operating out of Cannes and Toulon, France. Parker bombarded enemy positions ashore on 4, 6, 11, 12, and 20 March. She continued Mediterranean operations until sailing for the United States, arriving New York 23 May.

Following training at Guantánamo Bay, Cuba, Parker proceeded to the West Coast via Panama City, Panama, and the Panama Canal. She departed San Diego 29 July for Hawaii, arriving Pearl Harbor 4 August.

On 17 August, the ship departed Pearl Harbor for Okinawa. Along the way were stops at Eniwetok (Enewetok) atoll, Marshall Islands (MI) (31 August), Saipan, Tinian, and Guam, all in the Mariana Islands. She arrived at Okinawa on 4 September. She departed Okinawa 8 September as an escort to a convoy proceeding to Korea, arriving Jinsen 15 September and returning to Okinawa 17 September 1945.

The final wartime mission, the trip home: She continued from Okinawa, leaving on 26 September 1945, to Tokyo, arriving 29 September and staying through 2 October. She left Tokyo briefly, but returned one last time, arriving 4 October, then leaving for the last time on 6 October for home, stopping at Eniwetok atoll, MI, 11 October 1945 (1 day), then to Pearl Harbor, 17 October thru 22 October 1945, and finally San Pedro, California, USA 28 October 1945.

== Fate ==
After returning home, Parker decommissioned 31 January 1947, entered the U.S. Atlantic Reserve Fleet; and was berthed at Charleston, South Carolina. She was struck from the Naval Vessel Register on 1 July 1971 and sold for scrap in 1973.

== Awards ==
Parker received four battle stars for World War II service.
