= List of ambassadors of the United States to South Korea =

Ambassador of the United States to South Korea
- 주한미국대사
- Seal of the United States Department of State

- Flag of a United States ambassador

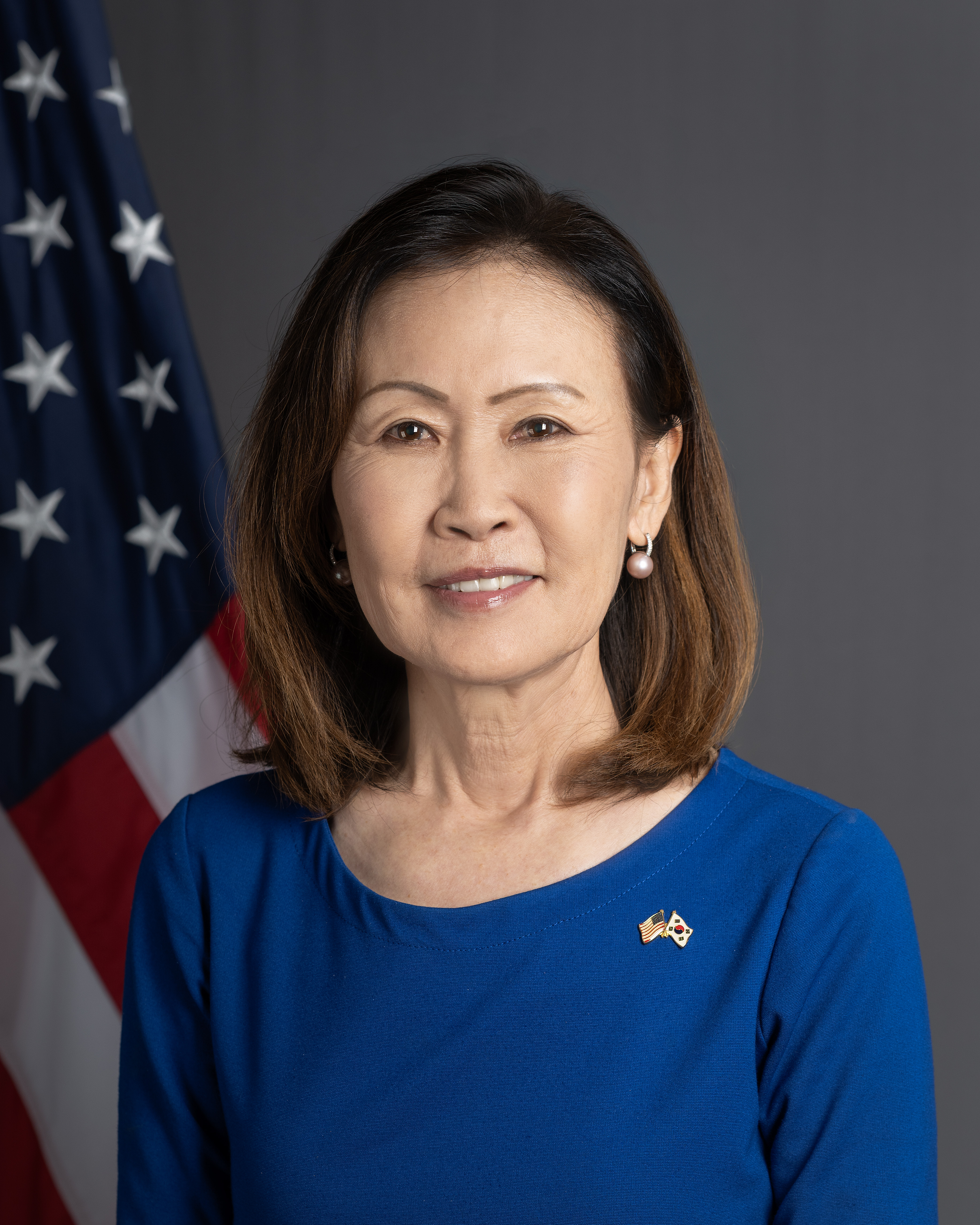
- Incumbent; Michelle Steel since August 12, 2026
- Reports to: U.S. Secretary of State
- Residence: Habib House
- Seat: Seoul, South Korea
- Nominator: The president of the United States
- Appointer: The president with Senate advice and consent
- Inaugural holder: Lucius H. Foote (as Envoy)
- Formation: May 20, 1883
- Website: U.S. Embassy - Korea

The United States ambassador to South Korea (Korean: 주한미국대사; Hanja: 駐韓美國大使) is the chief diplomatic representative of the United States accredited to the Republic of Korea. The ambassador's official title is "Ambassador Extraordinary and Plenipotentiary of the United States of America to the Republic of Korea."

== Korea ==
After the United States–Korea Treaty of 1882 was negotiated, diplomatic representatives were sent from Washington to Seoul. From then until 1905, there were several Envoys and Consuls General, each heading what was called a legation. After the Japanese had defeated the Chinese in 1895, and the Russians in 1905, Korea began to see its independence disappear. By 1910, Japan had annexed Korea and the U.S. no longer had a diplomatic presence in Korea.

=== Envoy, resident minister, and consul-general ===
Name	Portrait	Appointment	Presentation	Termination	Appointer	Notes
Lucius H. Foote		February 27, 1883	May 20, 1883	February 19, 1885	Chester A. Arthur	
George Clayton Foulk		(acting)	February 19, 1885	June 12, 1886	(acting)	Chargé d’Affaires ad interim
William Harwar Parker		February 19, 1886	June 12, 1886	September 3, 1886	Grover Cleveland	
George Clayton Foulk		(acting)	September 3, 1886	April 13, 1887	(acting)	Chargé d’Affaires ad interim
Hugh A. Dinsmore		January 12, 1887	April 13, 1887	May 26, 1890	Grover Cleveland	
Augustine Heard		January 30, 1890	May 26, 1890	June 27, 1893	Benjamin Harrison	
John M. B. Sill		January 12, 1894	April 30, 1894	September 13, 1897	Grover Cleveland	
Horace Newton Allen		July 17, 1897	September 13, 1897	October 1, 1901	William McKinley	
Horace Newton Allen		June 17, 1901	October 1, 1901	June 9, 1905	William McKinley	as Envoy
Edwin V. Morgan		March 18, 1905	June 26, 1905	November 17, 1905	Theodore Roosevelt	

== South Korea ==
At the end of World War II, U.S. forces accepted Japan's surrender in southern Korea, and Soviet forces accepted the surrender of the Japanese in northern Korea. Talks to agree upon a unity government for Korea failed, and in 1948, two separate Korean states were created: the Republic of Korea (South Korea) and the Democratic People's Republic of Korea (North Korea). The United States established diplomatic relations with the new South Korean government, but did not recognize North Korea. Other countries, like the Soviet Union, recognized the Pyongyang government in North Korea, but did not initially establish relations with the South Korean government in Seoul.

The United States has maintained constant diplomatic relations with South Korea since 1948, with formal recognition of the Republic of Korea on 1 January 1949. The American special representative, John J. Muccio, became the first Ambassador to the Republic of Korea on March 1, 1949.

The Embassy of the United States in Seoul has jurisdiction over APP Busan.

=== Ambassador ===
#	Name	Portrait	Appointment	Presentation	Termination	Appointer	Notes
1	John J. Muccio		April 7, 1949	April 20, 1949	September 8, 1952	Harry S. Truman	
2	Ellis O. Briggs		August 25, 1952	November 25, 1952	April 12, 1955	Harry S. Truman	
3	William S. B. Lacy		March 24, 1955	May 12, 1955	October 20, 1955	Dwight D. Eisenhower	
4	Walter C. Dowling		May 29, 1956	July 14, 1956	October 2, 1959	Dwight D. Eisenhower	
5	Walter P. McConaughy		October 5, 1959	December 17, 1959	April 12, 1961	Dwight D. Eisenhower	
—	Marshall Green		(acting)	April 12, 1961	June 27, 1961	(acting)	Chargé d’Affaires ad interim
6	Samuel D. Berger		June 12, 1961	June 27, 1961	July 10, 1964	John F. Kennedy	
7	Winthrop G. Brown		July 31, 1964	August 14, 1964	June 10, 1967	Lyndon B. Johnson	
8	William J. Porter		June 9, 1967	August 23, 1967	August 18, 1971	Lyndon B. Johnson	
9	Philip C. Habib		September 30, 1971	October 10, 1971	August 19, 1974	Richard Nixon	
10	Richard L. Sneider		August 23, 1974	September 18, 1974	June 21, 1978	Gerald Ford	
11	William H. Gleysteen Jr.		June 27, 1978	July 24, 1978	June 10, 1981	Jimmy Carter	
12	Richard L. Walker		July 18, 1981	August 12, 1981	October 25, 1986	Ronald Reagan	
13	James R. Lilley		October 16, 1986	November 26, 1986	January 3, 1989	Ronald Reagan	
14	Donald Gregg		September 14, 1989	September 27, 1989	February 27, 1993	George H. W. Bush	
—	Raymond Burghardt		(acting)	February 27, 1993	November 2, 1993	(acting)	Chargé d’Affaires ad interim
15	James T. Laney		October 15, 1993	November 2, 1993	February 5, 1996	Bill Clinton	
—	Richard A. Christenson		(acting)	February 5, 1996	December 15, 1997	(acting)	Chargé d’Affaires ad interim
16	Stephen W. Bosworth		October 24, 1997	December 15, 1997	February 10, 2001	Bill Clinton	
—	Evans Revere		(acting)	February 10, 2001	September 12, 2001	(acting)	Chargé d’Affaires ad interim
17	Thomas C. Hubbard		August 3, 2001	September 12, 2001	April 17, 2004	George W. Bush	
18	Christopher R. Hill		May 12, 2004	September 1, 2004	April 12, 2005	George W. Bush	
—	Mark C. Minton		(acting)	April 12, 2005	October 17, 2005	(acting)	Chargé d’Affaires ad interim
19	Alexander R. Vershbow		October 12, 2005	October 17, 2005	September 18, 2008	George W. Bush	
20	Kathleen Stephens		August 4, 2008	October 6, 2008	October 23, 2011	George W. Bush	
21	Sung Kim		October 13, 2011	November 25, 2011	October 24, 2014	Barack Obama	
22	Mark Lippert		September 26, 2014	November 21, 2014	January 20, 2017	Barack Obama	
—	Marc Knapper		(acting)	January 20, 2017	July 7, 2018	(acting)	Chargé d’Affaires ad interim
23	Harry B. Harris Jr.		June 29, 2018	July 25, 2018	January 20, 2021	Donald Trump	
—	Robert G. Rapson		(acting)	January 20, 2021	July 15, 2021	(acting)	Chargé d’Affaires ad interim
—	Christopher Del Corso		(acting)	July 15, 2021	July 10, 2022	(acting)	Chargé d’Affaires ad interim
24	Philip S. Goldberg		May 5, 2022	July 12, 2022	January 10, 2025	Joe Biden	
—	Joseph Y. Yun		(acting)	January 10, 2025	October 24, 2025	(acting)	Chargé d’Affaires ad interim
—	Y. Kevin Kim		(acting)	October 27, 2025	January 7, 2026	(acting)	Chargé d’Affaires ad interim
—	James R. Heller		(acting)	January 7, 2026	July 8, 2026	(acting)	Chargé d’Affaires ad interim
25	Michelle Steel		June 17, 2026	August 12, 2026	Present	Donald Trump	

== See also ==
- List of ambassadors of South Korea to the United States
- List of United States special representatives for North Korea
- Ambassadors of the United States
- Foreign relations of North Korea
- Foreign relations of South Korea
- North Korea–United States relations
- South Korea–United States relations
