= Walter C. Dowling =

American diplomat

3rd United States Ambassador to West Germany
- In office December 3, 1959 – April 21, 1963
- President: Dwight D. Eisenhower; John F. Kennedy
- Preceded by: David K. E. Bruce
- Succeeded by: George C. McGhee

4th United States Ambassador to Korea
- In office July 14, 1956 – October 2, 1959
- President: Dwight D. Eisenhower
- Preceded by: William S.B. Lacy
- Succeeded by: Walter P. McConaughy

Personal details
- Born: August 4, 1905 Atkinson, Georgia
- Died: July 1, 1977 (aged 71) Savannah, Georgia
- Spouse: Alice Jernigan
- Children: 2
- Education: Mercer University

Walter Cecil Dowling (August 4, 1905 – July 1, 1977) was the United States Ambassador to West Germany from 1959–1963 and the US Ambassador to South Korea from 1956–1959.

Dowling was born in Atkinson County, Georgia. He received a bachelor's degree from Mercer University in 1925. In 1932 he became the vice consul in Norway. He worked his way through various foreign postings and postings at the State Department before becoming United States Ambassador to South Korea in 1956. Picked by President Dwight Eisenhower to become Assistant Secretary of State for European and Eurasian Affairs, he was confirmed by the Senate, but diverted to Bonn, where he served as United States Ambassador to West Germany up to and through the Berlin Crisis of 1961.

Appointed a Career Ambassador in 1962, an operation cut short his career; in 1963, he retired from the Foreign Service.

After he left the State Department, he became Director-General of the Atlantic Institute, before returning to Mercer University and teaching political science. He died in 1977.

Diplomatic posts
| Preceded by David K. E. Bruce | United States Ambassador to Germany; 1959–1963 | Succeeded by George C. McGhee |
| Preceded by William S.B. Lacy | United States Ambassador to South Korea; 1956–1959 | Succeeded by Walter P. McConaughy |
