= USS Falcon (1846) =

1840s gunboat

History

United States
- Name: USS Falcon
- Acquired: November 14, 1846
- Commissioned: November 14, 1846
- Decommissioned: September 4, 1848
- Fate: Sold, October 18, 1848

General characteristics
- Type: Gunboat
- Displacement: 80 long tons (81 t)
- Propulsion: Steam engine
- Complement: 40
- Armament: 1 × 32-pounder carronade

USS Falcon was a gunboat in the United States Navy. Falcon was captured as the Mexican gunboat Isabel on November 14, 1846 at Tampico, and taken into the Navy.

== Mexican–American War operations ==
Operating throughout the remainder of the Mexican–American War with the Home Squadron in the Gulf of Mexico, Falcon took part in the amphibious operation at Vera Cruz from March 9–25, 1847. A force of over 10,000 troops was landed to attack the city and its guardian castle of San Juan de Ulúa, and while the squadron fired upon the seaward fortifications, a naval battery of six heavy guns was landed to aid the troops. The garrison displayed a flag of truce on the 25th when the city walls were breached, and four days later American troops took possession of the city and the castle.

Falcon served on guard and patrol duty off the Mexican coast, and in April 1848 voyaged to New Orleans for supplies.

She sailed from Campeche on July 18 for New York, where she arrived on August 27 and was decommissioned on September 4. Falcon was sold on October 18.
