= Foxhall A. Parker Sr. =

US Navy officer

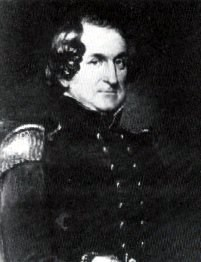
- Born: 1788; Westmoreland County, Virginia
- Died: November 23, 1857 (aged 68–69)
- Relatives: Foxhall A. Parker Jr. (son); William Harwar Parker (son)
- Military career
- Allegiance: United States
- Branch: United States Navy
- Service years: 1808 - 1857
- Rank: Commodore
- Commands: USS Constitution; Home Squadron; East India Squadron
- Conflicts: War of 1812

Foxhall Alexander Parker Sr. (1788 – 23 November 1857) was an officer in the United States Navy. He was Commander-in-Chief of the East India Squadron (ie. U.S. Navy forces in the Far East), commanded the Home Squadron, and was commander of the USS Constitution.

== Biography ==
Parker was born in Rock Spring, Westmoreland County, Virginia.

In 1814, he married Sarah Jay Bogardus (born 1794), daughter of Robert Bogardus (1771–1841). They had eight children, including Foxhall A. Parker Jr. (1821–1879) and William Harwar Parker (1826–1896), who were also prominent naval officers.

== Career ==
Parker joined the Navy as a midshipman on January 1, 1808. During the War of 1812 he was captured at sea. He was commissioned lieutenant on March 9, 1813, commander on March 3, 1825, and captain on March 3, 1835.

In 1821, he served in USS Constitution as first lieutenant, and he assumed command of her in 1842.

Parker was appointed commander of the East Indian Squadron in 1843. While in this position he was involved with Caleb Cushing's mission to Macao where Parker and Cushing were two of the three signatories of the Treaty of Wanghia.

Following his assignment with Cushing, he was sent to Europe in 1848 to advise the German government while commanding the Boston naval yard. They had requested an American officer to assist with the organization of their navy. He was sent on the recommendation of the Secretary of the Navy, John T. Mason. While there, he was offered Supreme Command of the German Navy (Reichsflotte). He declined, his son later presumed, because he didn't want to leave the US Navy and was concerned about the unsettled state of Europe at the time.

In 1851, Parker was appointed "special Commissioner" to Havana, Cuba, to meet with Spanish General Captain Concha, who held 156 American prisoners who were sentenced to work in prison mines as punishment for their involvement in a failed insurrection. Parker's negotiations with Concha were made in parallel with other American diplomats, but Parker's contributions 'did no harm' in Concha's later decision to release the prisoners.

Later that year, Parker was involved in an incident in Nicaragua which involved a British ship firing on an American ship and had the potential to escalate into a war between the two countries. Business magnate Cornelius Vanderbilt arrived by ship in the Nicaraguan port of Greytown (a British port), but refused to pay port fees and steamed away. The British fired upon Vanderbilt's ship and escorted it back to harbor where the angered Vanderbilt paid the fee. Parker with two warships was dispatched to Greytown where he informed the British the United States would not tolerate the collection of port duties by the British Navy. The British officer commanding the Royal Navy in the Caribbean (Vice-Admiral George F. Seymour) took immediate steps to defuse the crisis by admonishing the captain who had fired the shots, and sent one of his captains to meet with Parker and assure him "the interception of Vanderbilt's ship was completely unauthorized."

In 1853, Parker was relieved of his duties as commodore of the Home Squadron.

== See also ==
Military offices
Preceded by Lawrence Kearny	Commander, East India Squadron; 27 February 1843–21 April 1845	Succeeded by James Biddle
