= Embassy of the United States, Seoul =

Diplomatic mission in South Korea

Embassy of the United States in Seoul 주한미국대사관

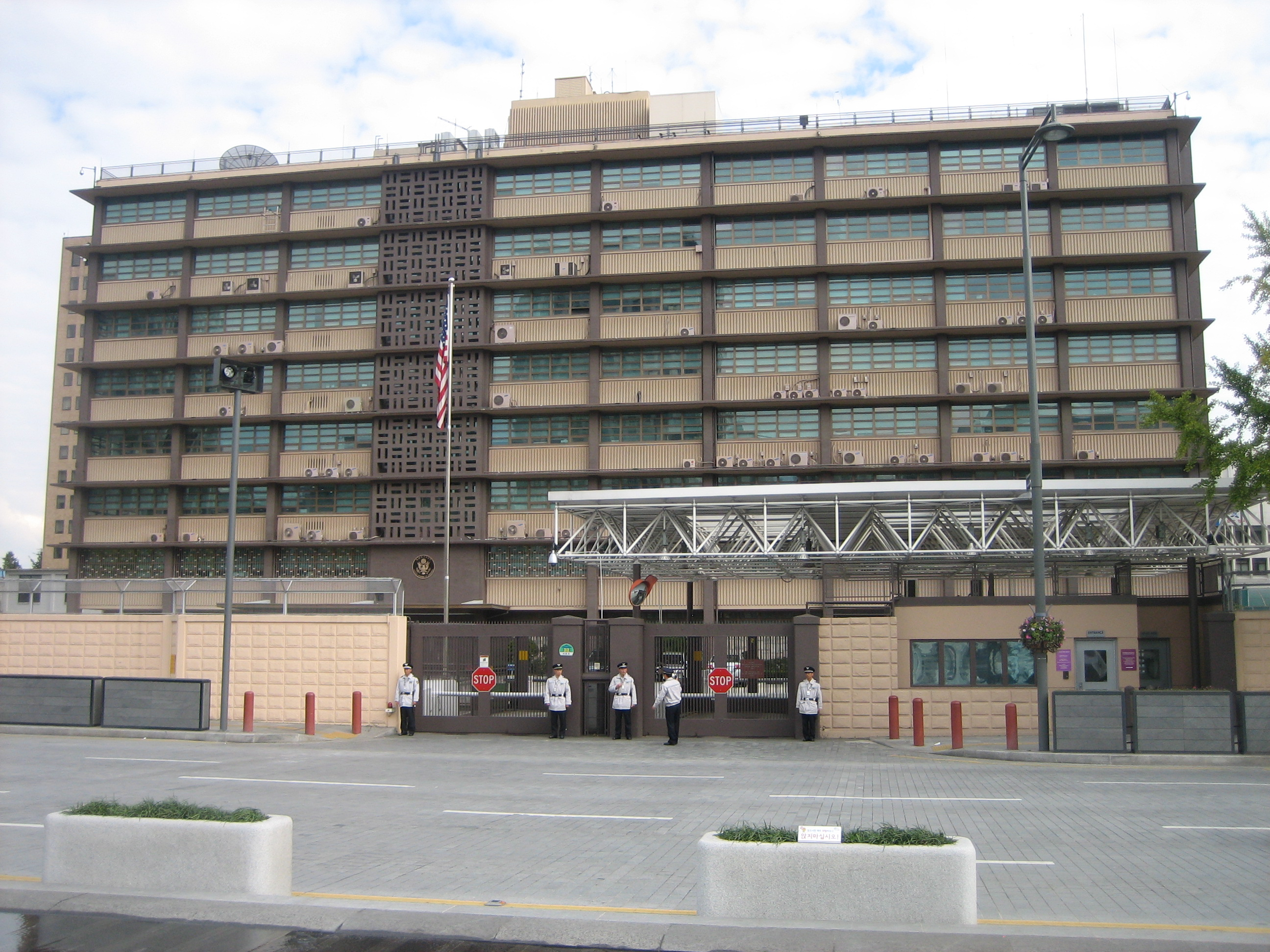
- Location: 188 Sejong-daero, Jongno-gu, Seoul, South Korea
- Coordinates: 37.573056°N 126.9775°E
- Website: kr.usembassy.gov

Korean name
- Hangul: 주한 미국 대사관
- Hanja: 駐韓美國大使館
- RR: Juhan Miguk daesagwan
- MR: Chuhan Miguk taesagwan

The Embassy of the United States in Seoul is the diplomatic mission of the United States in South Korea. The embassy is charged with diplomacy and South Korea–United States relations. The United States Ambassador to Korea is the head of the diplomatic mission of the United States to South Korea.

== History ==
The United States has had diplomatic relations with Korea, with interruption, since the late 1870s.

Korean government relations with nations not aligned with Qing China were more or less unknown and not welcome before that time. As China's power began to seriously wane in the 1800s, and as Japan's power, and increasing industrialization was on the rise, Korea began to make changes and make overtures to other nations.

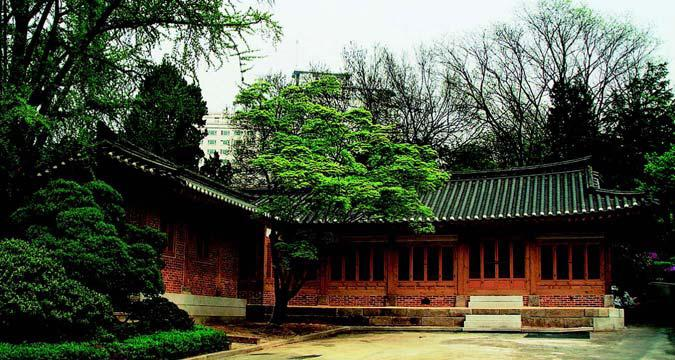
Old American Legation.

In 1883 the first Minister to Joseon (Korea) arrived in Seoul and a legation of sorts began operation. Soon a legation was run out of the Minister's residence, a villa given to the U.S. in 1888 by a Korean royal, located just behind the Deoksugung. This site is still owned by the U.S. government, and is the current site of the Habib House, the official ambassadorial residence of the U.S. Ambassador. The Habib House was built as a hanok (traditional Korean home) in 1974 and is named after Ambassador Philip Charles Habib.

The rise of the Empire of Japan as a great power began with the Japanese victory over China in the First Sino-Japanese War (1895) and victory of Japan over Russia in the Russo-Japanese War (1905). In 1910, Korea entered a period of Japanese rule that ended its independence. After this was formalized in the Japan-Korea Annexation Treaty, the U.S. mission in Seoul was shut down.

A U.S. embassy was not again established in Korea until the end of World War II, after the Allied forces defeated the Japanese. American and Soviet forces took control of Korea from the Japanese. The Americans set up an American military government in Seoul in the South, and while the Soviets set up a government in Pyongyang in the north. The U.S. recognized the government in Seoul in 1948, the same year North Korea was recognized by the Soviets.

From 1948 the American embassy operated out of a leased hotel building.

=== Korean War ===
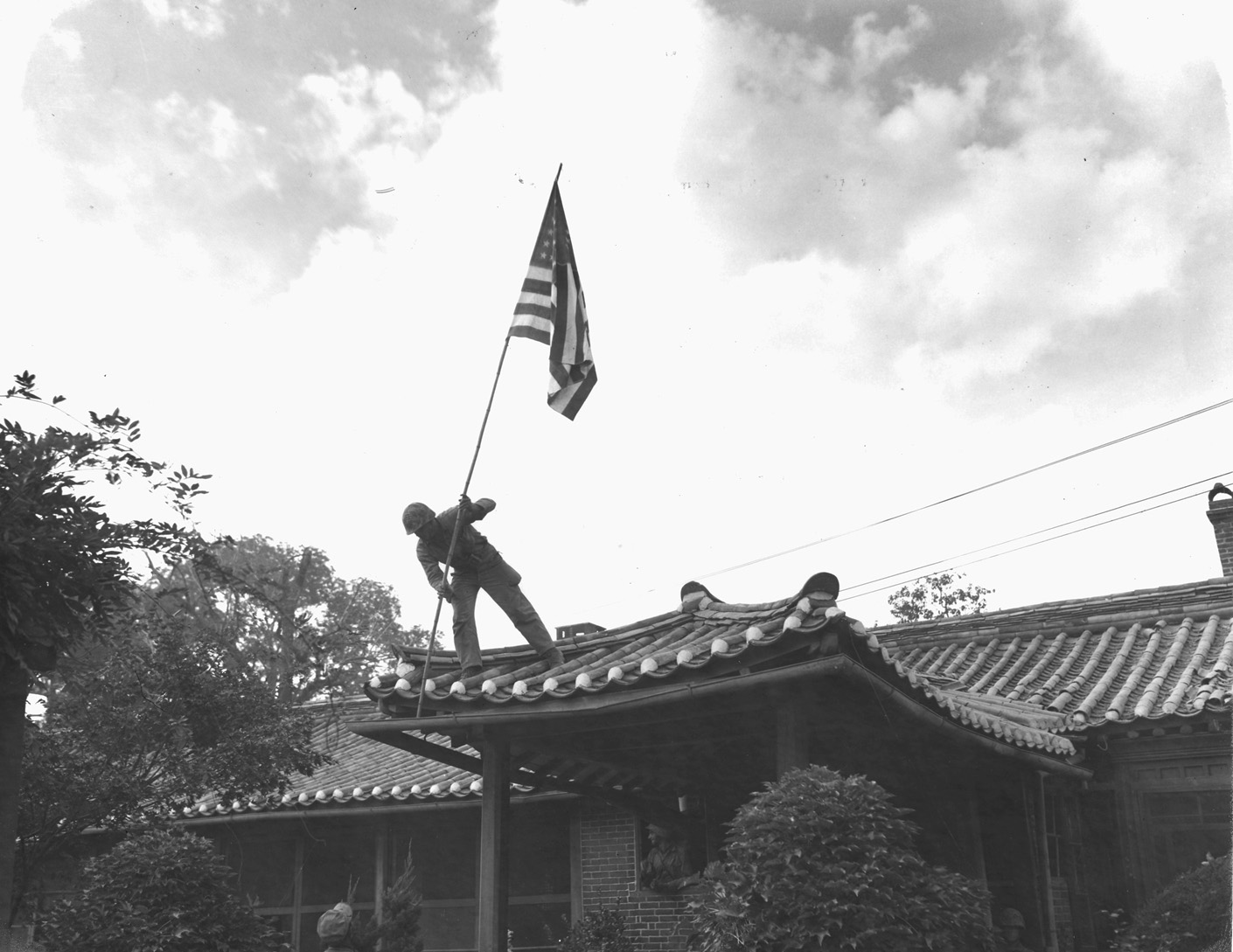
U.S. Marine raises the flag at the old American Legation building in Seoul.

When North Korean troops invaded South Korea on June 25, 1950, the Korean War began, and the U.S. Embassy in Seoul was evacuated. Seoul was captured by the North Korean forces by the end of June. The chancery (on the 5th floor of Hotel Bando) was retaken September 26 that year, by Easy Company of 2nd Battalion, 1st Marine Regiment, acting as a United Nations force. It was lost again to Chinese and North Korean forces in early 1951.

In April 1951, United Nations forces retook Seoul for good. The Korean War ended in July 1953 in stalemate, and the U.S. Embassy was eventually re-opened.

=== After the Korean War ===
The embassy has operated in Seoul continuously since the end of the Korean War.

The current chancery building was built in 1962 and was initially an office for the United States Agency for International Development (USAID). Several years later, the building was given to the U.S. Embassy. The Chancery has a virtually identical sister building, built at the same time, directly to its north. This building was once also part of the USAID office in Seoul, but was turned over to the South Korean government, which uses it as National Museum of Korean Contemporary History.

The Chancery is located in the heart of downtown Seoul, in the Jongno District. It is on the main street leading to the Gyeongbokgung and directly next to several major Korean government agency buildings. At the time of its construction the building was one of the tallest in Seoul and comparatively modern. Today the Chancery building is much too small and antiquated for the embassy's needs.

Attempts at building a new Chancery have been in the plans since about 1980, but funding issues by the United States Congress, botched negotiations with the South Korean government, and political wrangling between the U.S. and South Korean governments over an appropriate site, have led to the lengthy delay in a new Chancery. In 1986 the U.S. purchased land, the Kyunggi Girls' High School site, near the U.S. Ambassador's residence. This was encouraged by the South Korean government at the time, with the idea that this site would be the home to a new Chancery building. Full efforts to build there by the Americans were rebuffed by recently empowered local community groups who believed that construction at that site would disturb buried archaeological evidence, would overshadow the nearby Deoksugung and ruin the aesthetics of the neighborhood. Current plans call for a new Chancery to be built on land to be relinquished by the U.S. Army leaving the Yongsan Garrison south of downtown Seoul, but still north of the Han River.

== Role ==
The U.S. Embassy in Seoul has traditionally played a key and prominent role in South Korea politics. Issues such as the ever-present danger from North Korea, the presence of U.S. troops in South Korea, and the deference of South Korea to the U.S. have been factors that lead to such importance.

Increasingly the U.S. Embassy has been the focus of demonstrations in Seoul. Whenever a controversial issue crops up involving the U.S. presence in Korea, a demonstration will almost invariably occur at the U.S. Embassy. Several platoons of Korean riot police are always present in front of the U.S. Embassy. In the 1990s, other U.S. diplomatic posts in Korea have been shut down, the last being the Consulate in Pusan in early 1999.

== Busan Consulate ==
A consulate in Busan (Pusan) was closed in 1999, but in February 2007 a Virtual Presence Post was opened in Busan (after 1999 the city changed its romanized spelling). In October 2007, VPP Busan was changed to the status of an American Presence Post—equivalent to a consulate—with a resident consul. In 2016, the office was promoted to a full Consulate. The Busan Consulate is located in a commercial office building, and is staffed by a single foreign service officer with several foreign service nationals playing key roles. It is increasingly conducting community outreach. It does not have a visa issuance section and it reports to and makes all visa issuance referrals to the Embassy in Seoul.

== Gallery ==
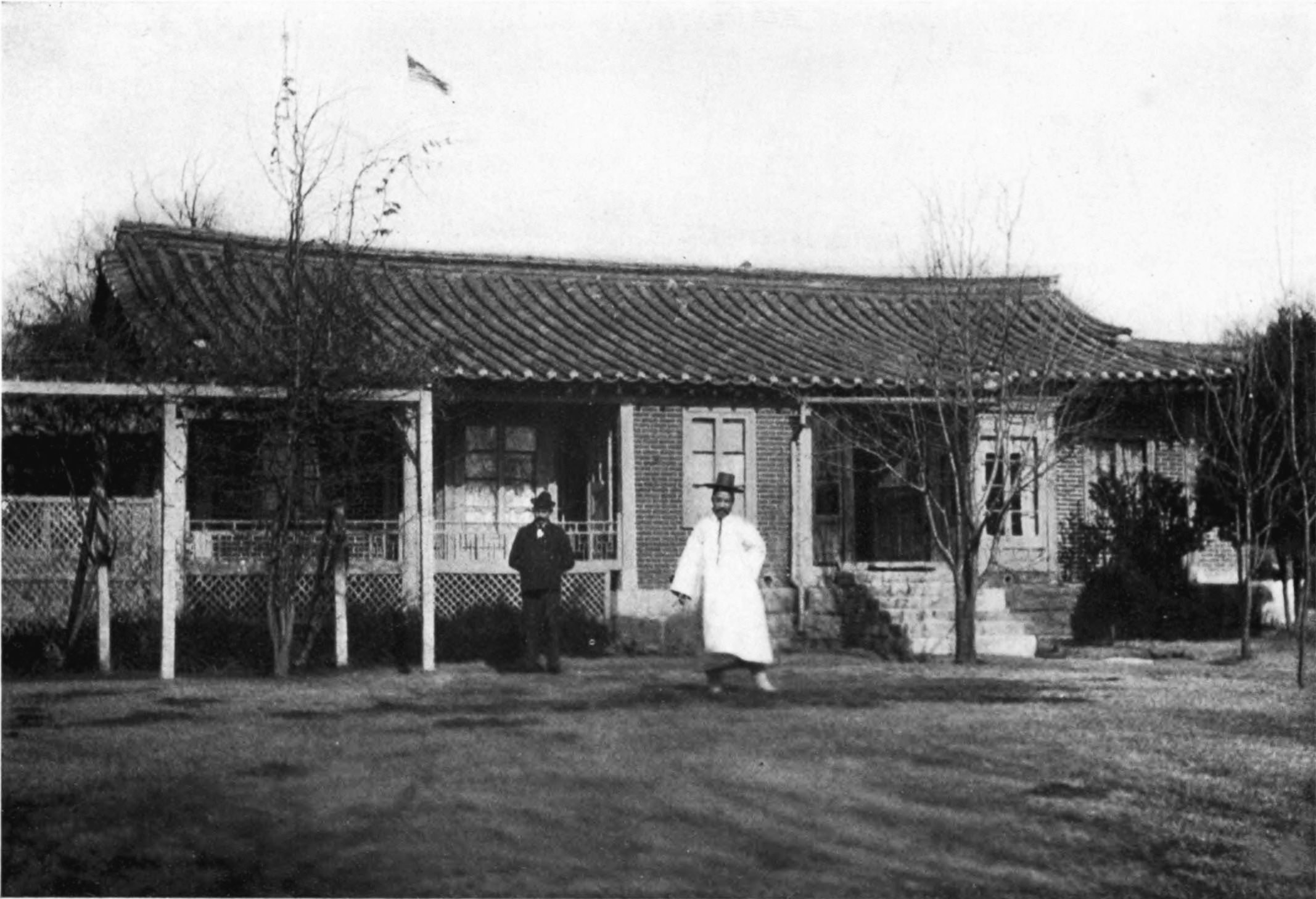
Residence of the American Consul-General (1900)

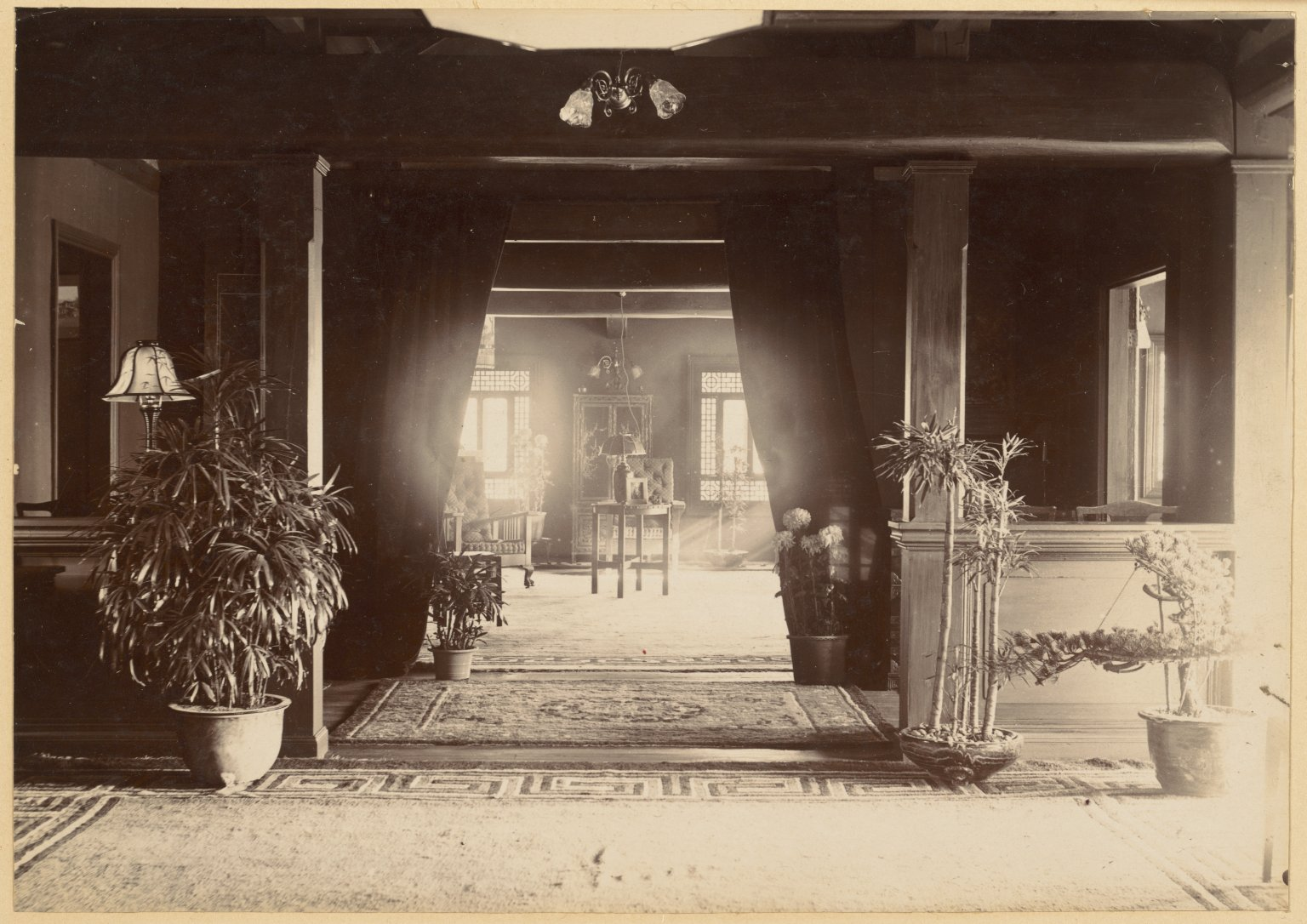
American Legation Interior

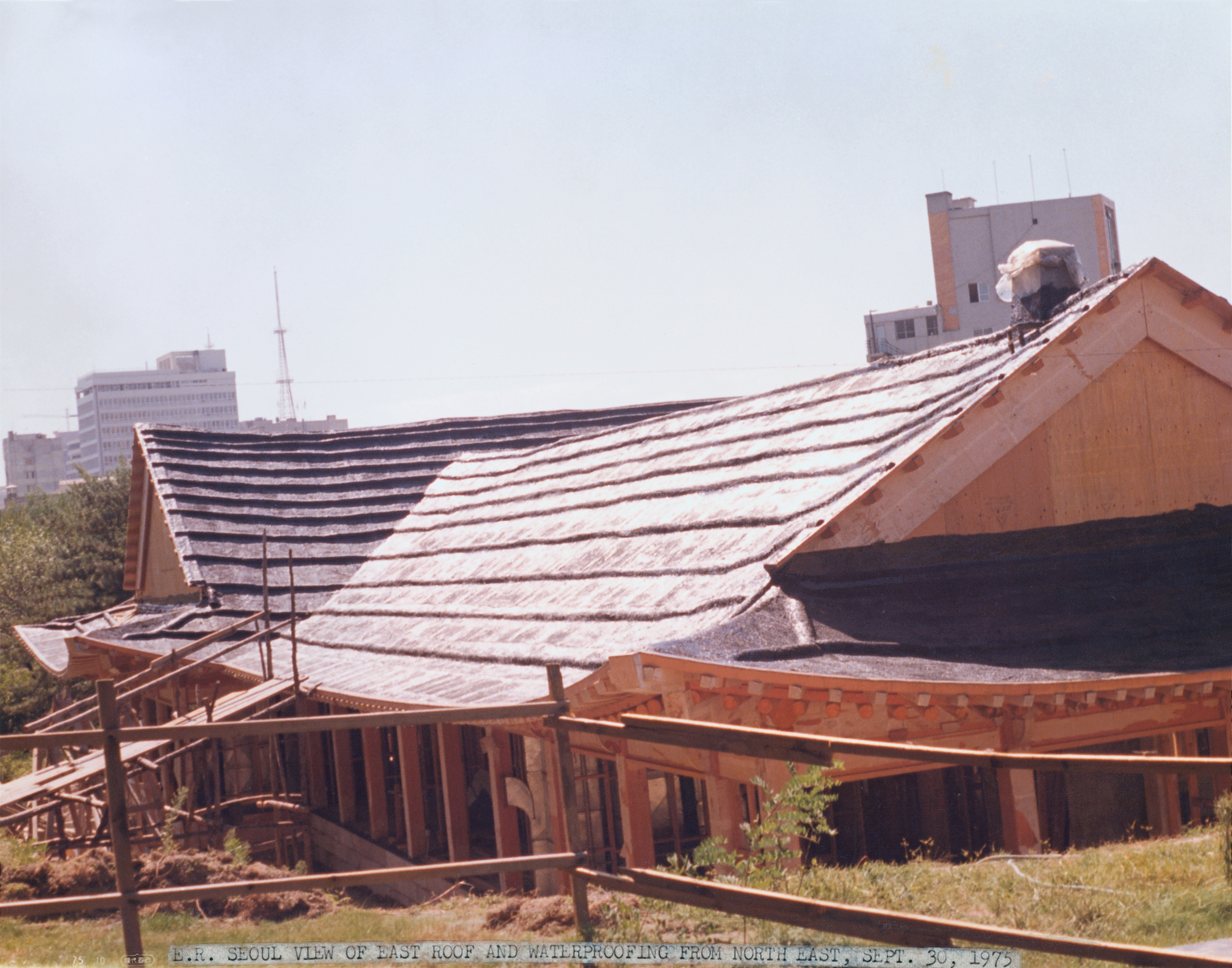
Embassy Mission Residence (1975)

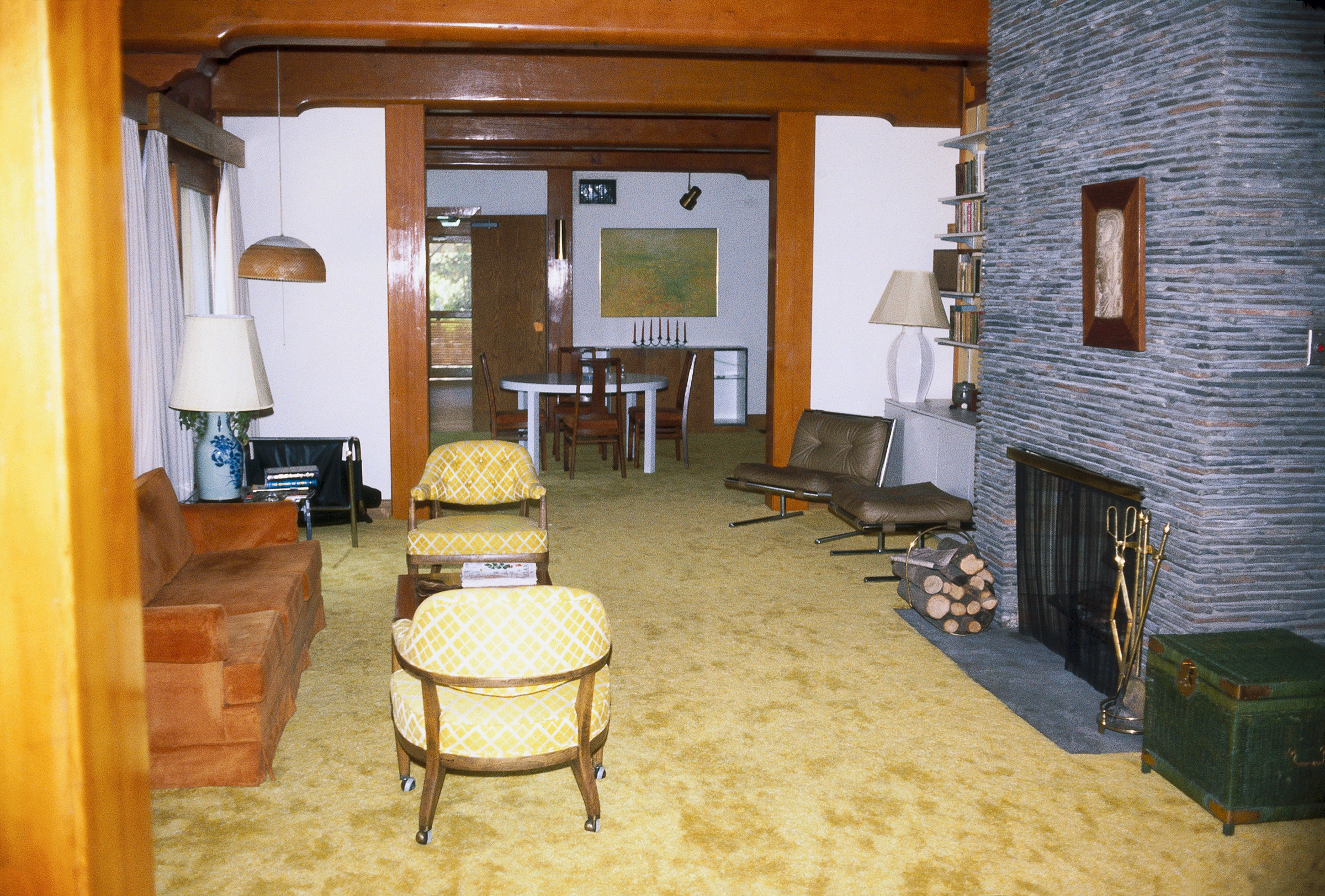
Embassy Mission Residence (1979)

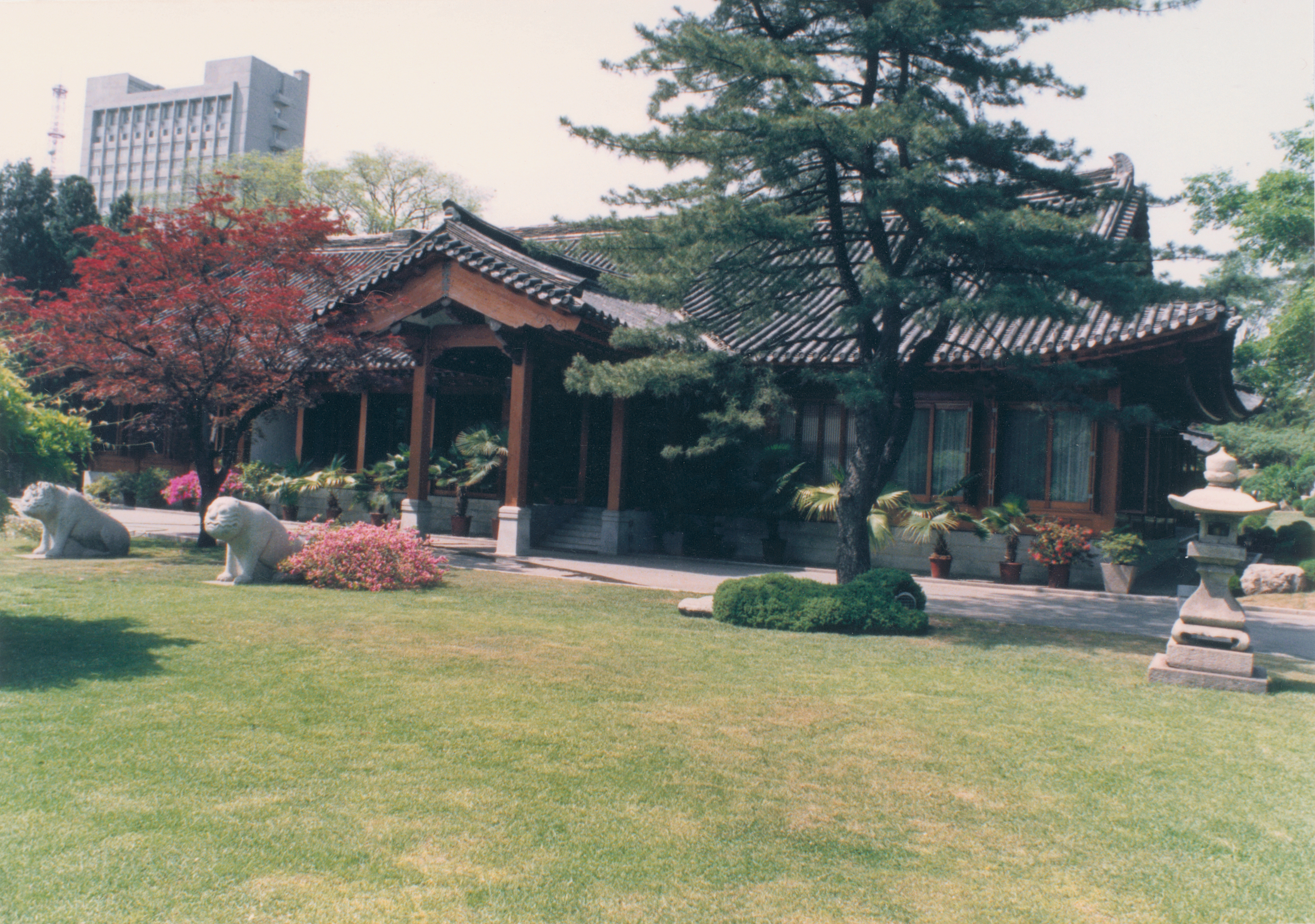
Embassy Mission Residence (1989)

== See also ==
- Ambassador of the United States to South Korea
- Consulate of the United States, Busan
