= Foxhall A. Parker Jr. =

United States Navy officer (1821–1879)

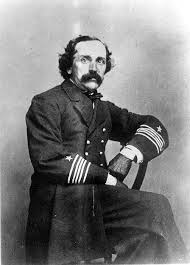
- Born: August 5, 1821; New York City, New York, U.S.
- Died: June 10, 1879 (aged 57); Annapolis, Maryland, U.S.
- Relatives: Foxhall A. Parker Sr. (father); William Harwar Parker (brother)
- Military career
- Allegiance: United States
- Branch: United States Navy
- Service years: 1837–79
- Rank: Commodore
- Commands: USS Mahaska; USS Wabash; Potomac Flotilla; Boston Navy Yard; United States Naval Academy
- Conflicts: Seminole Wars; American Civil War: Union blockade

Foxhall Alexander Parker Jr. (August 5, 1821 – June 10, 1879) was an officer in the United States Navy during the American Civil War and became one of the founders of the United States Naval Institute.

== Biography ==
He was born in New York on August 5, 1821, the son of Foxhall A. Parker Sr. and Sarah Jay Bogardus (born 1794), daughter of Robert Bogardus (1771–1841).

Parker was appointed a midshipman March 11, 1837. He was attached to the West Indian Squadron, then transferred to the Philadelphia Naval School, graduating in 1843. In 1842, he served under his father, Foxhall A. Parker Sr., in Constitution. He also served under his father in Brandywine. On September 21, 1850, he was commissioned lieutenant. He served against the Florida Indians, on the Great Lakes, the Mediterranean, the Pacific, and on various coast surveys.

From 1861 to 1862, he was executive officer of the navy yard at Washington, D.C. During the Civil War, he cooperated with the Army of the Potomac, protecting Alexandria, Virginia, after the First Battle of Bull Run. His capable manipulation of the forces at his command went far toward restoring order and confidence at Washington. He built Fort Dahlgren, and drilled 2,000 seamen in the exercise of artillery and small arms, thereby promoting the success of Admiral Andrew H. Foote's operations with the Mississippi Flotilla.

He became commander on July 16, 1862, had charge of the steam gunboat Mahaska in active service off Wilmington and Yorktown, and of the gunboat Wabash off Charleston from June to September 1863. He commanded a naval battery at the bombardment of Fort Sumter. Later, until the close of the war, he commanded the Potomac Flotilla, which consisted at one time of 42 vessels, and frequently engaged Confederate forces.

In 1866, he received the rank of captain. In 1872, as commodore and chief of staff of the North Atlantic Fleet, he drew up a code of signals for steam tactics. In 1877/8 he was in charge of the Boston Navy Yard. He became superintendent of the United States Naval Academy in 1878 and was one of the founders of the United States Naval Institute.

Parker died at Annapolis, Maryland and was interred at the United States Naval Academy Cemetery. His brother was William Harwar Parker, who served in the U.S. Navy and in the Confederate States Navy.

== Writings ==
Textbooks for the U.S. Naval Academy:

- Fleet Tactics Under Steam (1863)
- Squadron Tactics under Steam (1863)
- The Naval Howitzer Afloat (1865)
- The Naval Howitzer Ashore (1865)

History:

- The Fleets of the World: the Galley Period (1876)
- The Battle of Mobile Bay (1878)

== Namesakes ==
Two ships have been named USS Parker for him.

== See also ==
- List of superintendents of the United States Naval Academy

== Notes ==
Academic offices
Preceded by Christopher R.P. Rodgers	Superintendent of United States Naval Academy; 1878-1879	Succeeded by George B. Balch
