= George H. Cooper =

United States Navy officer

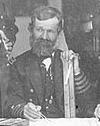
- Cooper photographed as a captain in June 1871 while in command of USS Colorado.
- Born: 27 July 1821; New York City, New York, US
- Died: 17 November 1891 (aged 70); Brooklyn, New York, US
- Burial place: Green-Wood Cemetery, Brooklyn, New York
- Military career
- Allegiance: United States
- Branch: United States Navy
- Service years: 1836–1884
- Rank: Rear Admiral
- Commands: USS Massachusetts; USS Mercedita; USS Connecticut; USS Sonoma; USS Sangamon; USS Glaucus; USS Winooski; USS Roanoke; USS Colorado; Pensacola Navy Yard; President, Board of Inspection and Survey; New York Navy Yard; North Atlantic Squadron
- Conflicts: Second Seminole War; African Slave Trade Patrol; Mexican War; Siege of Fort Texas First Battle of Tabasco Attack on Alvarado Battle of Tuxpan Second Battle of Tabasco: American Civil War; Union blockade: Korean Expedition

Rear Admiral George Henry Cooper (27 July 1821 – 17 November 1891) was an officer in the United States Navy. During his long naval career, he served on the African Slave Trade Patrol, and fought in the Second Seminole War, the Mexican War, the American Civil War, and the Korean Expedition, and rose to command of the North Atlantic Squadron.

== Early life ==
Cooper was born at Fort Diamond in New York City on 27 July 1821.

== Naval career ==
=== Second Seminole War ===
Cooper entered U.S. Navy service as an acting midshipman in January 1836 and was assigned to the sloop-of-war USS Concord, which was fitting out at the Portsmouth Navy Yard in Kittery, Maine. He sailed for the West Indies aboard Concord in March 1836, and after she was assigned to the fleet operating off Florida in the Second Seminole War, he saw constant service in boat expeditions against the Seminoles in cooperation with United States Army forces. Appointed midshipman on 14 August 1837, Cooper remained aboard Concord until the end of her cruise in November 1838.

=== 1839–1843 ===
In February 1839, Cooper was ordered to the frigate USS Constitution in the Pacific Squadron, remaining aboard her until 1841. He then was a watch officer aboard the schooner USS Shark until the spring of 1842, when he transferred to the sloop-of-war USS St. Louis. He detached from St. Louis when she arrived in Norfolk, Virginia, in September 1842 and then attended the Philadelphia Naval School in Philadelphia, Pennsylvania, until 1843. Upon completing his studies, he was promoted to passed midshipman on 23 or 29 June 1843 (sources vary).

=== African Slave Trade Patrol ===
Cooper's next assignment was to the frigate USS Macedonian, the flagship of the Africa Squadron, engaged in the African Slave Trade Patrol, serving aboard her as an acting master. He later transferred to the sloop-of-war USS Saratoga, also in the Africa Squadron, and returned to the United States aboard her in December 1844. He then performed a short tour of duty at the Norfolk Navy Yard in Portsmouth, Virginia, in the spring of 1845.

=== Mexican War ===
In 1846, Cooper was assigned to the schooner USS Flirt of the Home Squadron, and in March of that year Flirt reported for duty under U.S. Army Brigadier General (later major general) Zachary Taylor in the Mexican War. Cooper commanded a detachment of men at Port Isabel, Texas, in operations related to the Siege of Fort Texas of early May 1846, and remained with Taylor's force until the capture of Monterrey, Mexico, in September 1846. Flirt then was reassigned to Commodore David Conner's squadron off Veracruz, Mexico, and aboard her Cooper took part in the First Battle of Tabasco in October 1846, an attack on Alvarado, attacks on Tuxpan, and the Second Battle of Tabasco in June 1847. After the American capture of Mexico City in September 1847, Flirt detached from Conner's squadron and returned to the United States.

=== East India Squadron ===
Cooper next served aboard the receiving ship at the Norfolk Navy Yard from 1847 to 1848, then at Naval Station Norfolk in Norfolk, Virginia, from 1849 to 1850, and he was promoted to master on 11 October 1850. In November 1850 he reported for duty aboard the new sidewheel steam frigate USS Susquehanna, then fitting out at the New York Navy Yard in Brooklyn, New York. She was commissioned on 24 December 1850 and assigned to the East India Squadron. Promoted to lieutenant on 8 May 1851, Cooper was aboard Susquehanna when she became the flagship of Commodore Matthew C. Perry in 1852, visited Japan in 1853 and 1854 while Perry forced Japan to sign a trade treaty, and operated off the coast of China. His Susquehanna tour finally came to a close when the ship concluded her cruise at Philadelphia, Pennsylvania, in March 1855 after a voyage from China via the Indian Ocean and Cape of Good Hope.

Cooper next had duty in Norfolk again, first at the naval rendezvous there in 1856 and then on ordnance duty in 1857. He then was aboard the steam frigate USS Roanoke, flagship of the Home Squadron, from 1859 to 1860. He began a tour at Portsmouth Navy Yard in Kittery, Maine, on 1 August 1860, serving there through 1861.

=== American Civil War ===
The American Civil War broke out in April 1861, and in the spring of 1862 Cooper, promoted to commander on 16 July 1862, became commanding officer of the supply ship USS Massachusetts in operations along the United States East Coast. He later took command of the steamer USS Mercedita as part of the Union blockade of the Confederate States of America, operating as part of the South Atlantic Blockading Squadron. In November 1862, at the request of the American industrialist and philanthropist Cornelius Vanderbilt, he took command of the steamer USS Connecticut in the West Indies Squadron to escort Vanderbilt's mail steamers on their voyages between Aspinwall, Panama – then a part of the United States of Colombia – and New York City.

Detached from Connecticut in July 1863, Cooper returned to blockade duty. He became commanding officer of the sidewheel gunboat USS Sonoma in 1863 for operations in the South Atlantic Blockading Squadron. In 1864 he took command of the monitor USS Sangamon and became heavily involved in the blockade of Charleston, South Carolina, operating for seven weeks inside Charleston Roads on picket duty and in support of Union Army forces, and engaging in almost constant shelling of Confederate forces at Fort Sumter and on Sullivan's Island. He also served as senior officer at Stono Inlet, South Carolina, in joint operations with Union Army forces, frequently engaging Confederate forces at short range. He commanded the steamer USS Glaucus in the East Gulf Blockading Squadron from 1864 to 1865.

=== Korean Expedition ===
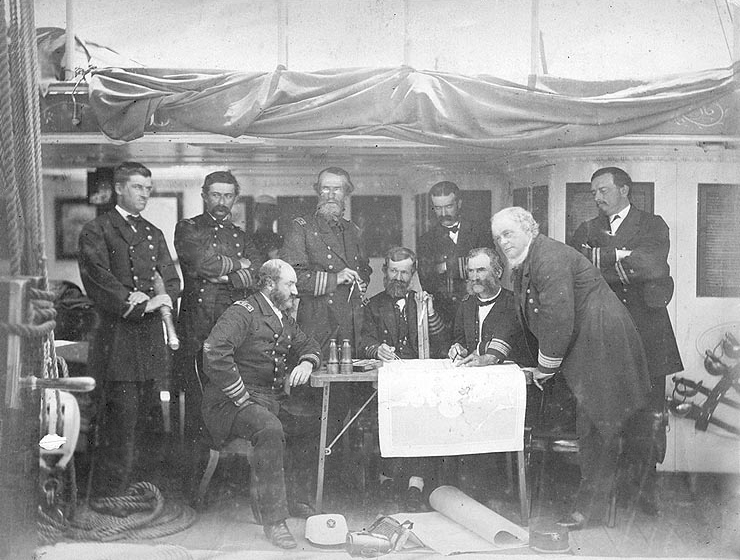
Cooper, photographed as a captain while commanding officer of USS Colorado, is seated at center in this posed photograph of U.S. Navy officers holding a council of war aboard Colorado off Korea in June 1871 prior to the Korean Expedition.

Cooper commanded the sidewheel gunboat USS Winooski on special service from 1866 to 1867. Promoted to captain on 2 December 1867, he was stationed at the Norfolk Navy Yard from 1867 to 1869. From 1869 to 1871, he commanded the screw frigate USS Colorado, the flagship of the Asiatic Squadron. When Korean shore batteries fired on two ships of the squadron in the Salee River on 1 June 1871 and Korea's Joseon Dynasty did not answer an American demand for an apology, Colorado, with squadron commander Rear Admiral John Rodgers and United States Minister to China and Korea Frederick Low aboard, was among five warships which participated in the Korean Expedition of 10–12 June 1871; the ships landed a force of sailors and U.S. Marines on Ganghwa Island and in the Battle of Ganghwa on 10 June 1871 attacked and captured several Korean forts, inflicting large casualties on the Korean defenders with minimal American losses.

=== Later career ===
In 1872, Cooper again served at the Norfolk Navy Yard, and from 1873 to 1874 he was in command of the ironclad USS Roanoke. He was promoted to commodore on 5 June 1874. He was commandant of the Pensacola Navy Yard at Pensacola, Florida, from 1875 to 1876, then was a lighthouse inspector from 1876 to 1877. He served as President of the Board of Inspection and Survey from 1877 until March 1880. He was commandant of the New York Navy Yard from 1 May 1880 to 1 April 1882, and was promoted to rear admiral on 15 November 1881.

Cooper was ordered to command of the North Atlantic Squadron in 1882, at one point attending the unveiling of a statue of George Washington at Caracas, Venezuela. He also commanded five ships of the squadron on a visit to New York City, where they anchored in the East River for the opening ceremonies for the New York and Brooklyn Bridge – now known as the Brooklyn Bridge – on 23 May 1883; all ships manned the yards and joined the New York Navy Yard and other nearby military installations in firing a salute to the new bridge. He remained in command of the squadron until he retired from the Navy on 27 July 1884.

== Personal life ==
Cooper was married and had at least two children. One son, also named George H. Cooper, drank excessively and was chronically unemployed, subsisting on a generous amount of money his parents sent him, and was arrested in September 1885 for theft from a boarding house where he was staying in Brooklyn, New York. Another son, Mason S. Cooper, born in 1847 in Portsmouth, Virginia, served in the U.S. Navy during the American Civil War, reaching the rank of ensign, spent 14 years as a captain of merchant ships of the Pacific Mail Steamship Company, was an inspector in the New York Custom House, and later became an admiral in command of the Haitian Navy; he died suddenly on 2 January 1891 in Brooklyn.

== Death ==
After a brief illness, Cooper died of heart failure in Brooklyn, New York, on 17 November 1891. He is buried at Green-Wood Cemetery in Brooklyn.

== Gallery ==
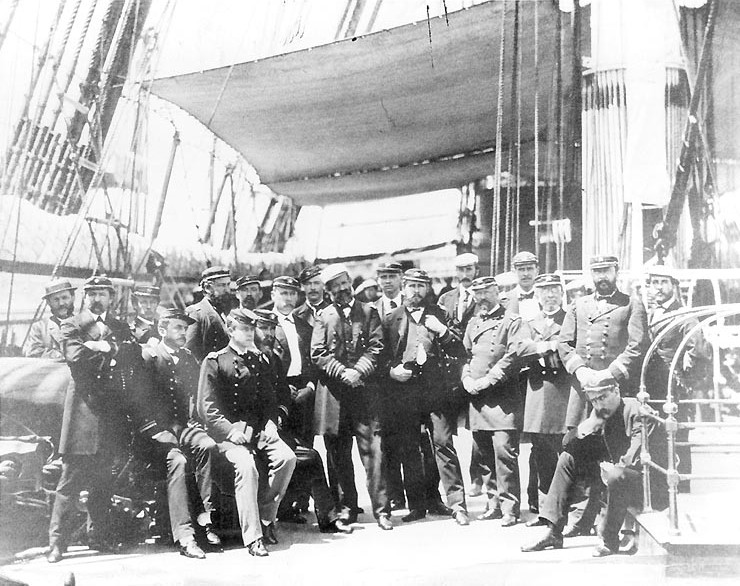
Cooper stands at center (hands clasped, head cocked to his right) with officers of USS Colorado off Korea in 1871 prior to the Korea Expedition.

== Notes ==
Military offices
Preceded by Robert H. Wyman	Commander-in-Chief, North Atlantic Squadron; 1 May 1882 – 19 June 1884	Succeeded by Stephen B. Luce
