= USS Albany (1846) =

American sloop in 1846

Coordinates: 10.571°N 75.867°W

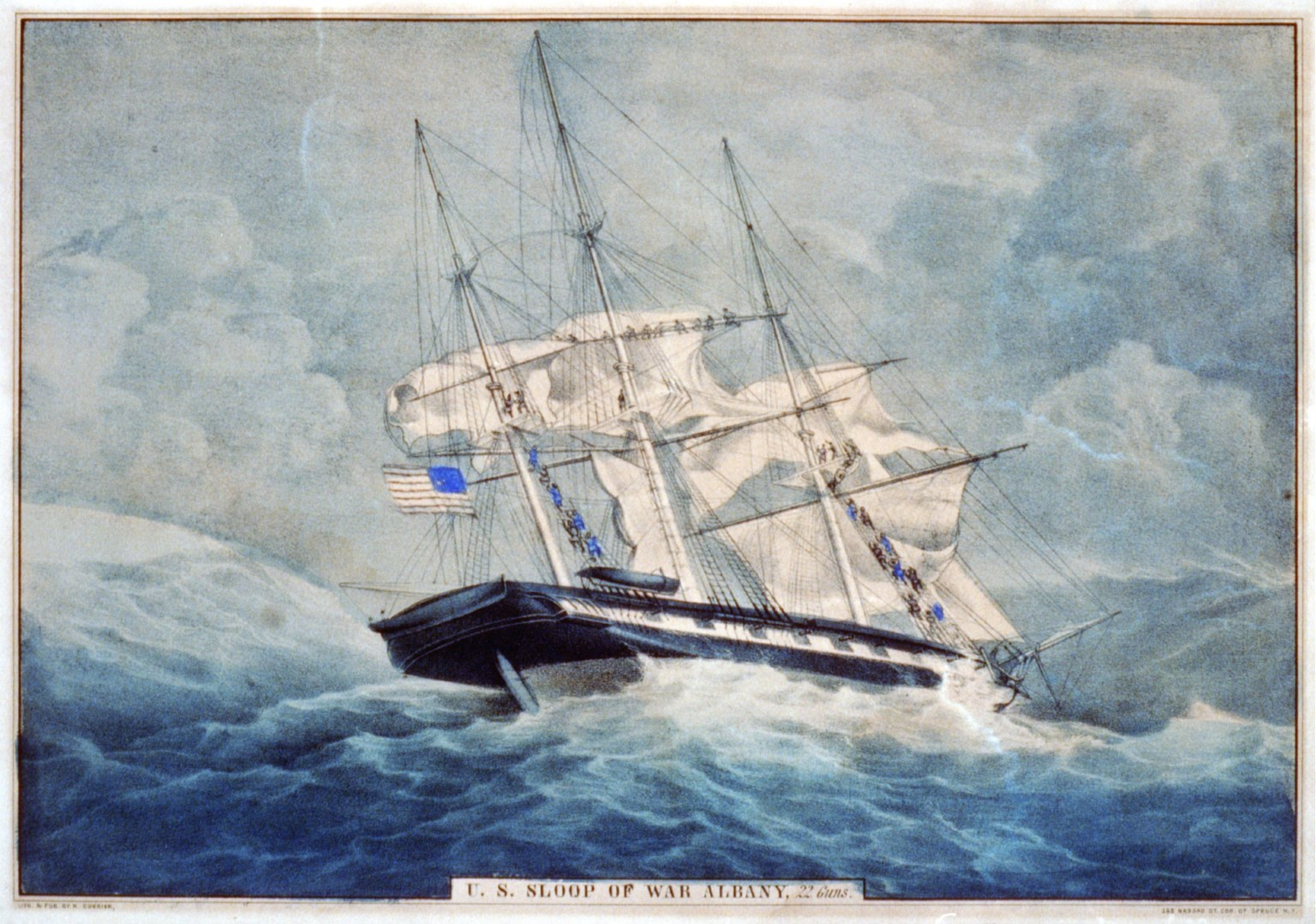
- Lithograph of USS Albany by Nathaniel Currier

History

United States
- Name: Albany
- Namesake: Albany, New York
- Builder: New York Navy Yard
- Laid down: 1843
- Launched: 27 June 1846
- Commissioned: 6 November 1846
- Home port: Naval Yard Warrington
- Fate: Lost at sea, last seen 28 or 29 September 1854

General characteristics
- Type: Sloop-of-war
- Tons burthen: 1,042
- Length: 147 ft 11 in (45.1 m) (p/p)
- Beam: 38 ft 6 in (11.7 m)
- Draft: 17 ft 9 in (5.4 m)
- Sail plan: Full rigged
- Speed: 13 knots (24 km/h; 15 mph)
- Complement: 210 officers and enlisted men
- Armament: 4 × 8 in (203 mm) shell guns; 18 × 32 pdr (15 kg) guns

USS Albany, the first United States Navy ship of that name, was built in the 1840s for the US Navy. The ship was among the last of the wooden sloops powered by sail and saw extensive service in the Mexican War. Before and after her combat service, Albany conducted surveillance and observation missions throughout the Caribbean. In September 1854, during a journey along the coast of Venezuela, Albany was lost with all hands on 28 or 29 September 1854. Included among the 250 men lost were several sons and grandsons of politically prominent men.

== Description and construction ==
Albany was one of a group of eight full-rigged, three-masted wooden sloops built in the early 1840s that were the last American sailing sloops to be commissioned. The ship measured 147 feet 11 inches (45.1 m) long between perpendiculars and she had a beam of 38 feet 6 inches (11.7 m). Albany had a draft of 17 feet 9 inches (5.4 m) and had a tonnage of 1042 tons burthen. The ship had a crew of 210 officers and enlisted men. She could maintain a speed of 13 knots (24 km/h; 15 mph). Albany could mount up to four 8-inch (203 mm) shell guns and eighteen 32-pounder (15 kg) cannon. By 1853, she was armed with six 8-inch guns and sixteen 32-pounder cannon.

The ship's keel was laid down in 1843 at the New York Navy Yard; she was launched on 27 June 1846, and commissioned on 6 November, with Captain Samuel Livingston Breese in command. Her construction was accelerated so she would be complete for the impending war with Mexico. Although she could carry 22 guns, Albany sailed with only 20.

== Service history in war with Mexico ==
The sloop put to sea for her first cruise on 26 November 1846 and joined the Home Squadron—then engaged in operations against Mexican forces—on 8 January 1847 at Anton Lizardo. Soon thereafter, however, she left the Mexican coast for an independent cruise to the vicinity of the Azores. Upon her return to the east coast of Mexico early in March, Albany guarded the transport anchorage at Isla Verde in preparation for General Winfield Scott's operations against Veracruz. During the 9 March amphibious action, Albany landed the reserve elements under Brigadier General David E. Twiggs. Because the Mexican leaders chose not to oppose the landings, Albany saw no combat. Later, on 22 March, the sloop of war sent one of her eight-inch shell guns and its crew ashore to assist in the siege of Veracruz.

After Veracruz surrendered on 29 March, Albany moved to the next objective—Alvarado. The Mexican forces, however, had already abandoned that port; and Lieutenant Charles G. Hunter, commanding Scourge, which arrived first, took possession of the town. Albany soon headed for another target—Tuxpan. She and the other ships of the squadron arrived at the mouth of the Tuxpan River on the morning of 17 April. Capt. Breese—commanding Albany—then formed his landing party of over 1,500 sailors and marines drawn from all ships in the squadron. They embarked in the barges and the six ships chosen to ascend the river and capture Tuxpan. Although Albany herself did not participate in the action, Breese and his landing party did. From 18 to 22 April, Breese's force moved up the river, engaged and captured two artillery batteries, destroyed fortifications and military equipment at Tuxpan, and then retired down the river to rejoin the squadron. When the American warships dispersed to various blockade stations along the eastern coast of Mexico, Albany and Reefer remained off the mouth of the Tuxpan River.

During service on the blockade at various other points, Albany arrived off the mouth of the Tabasco River by 13 June. As in the Tuxpan operation, members of her crew joined an inland expedition. The movement upriver began late in the first dog watch on 14 June. In two days, the American force ascended the river, disembarked the landing force, routed the defenders on the approaches to Tabasco, and captured the town. The Americans remained there until 22 July, when yellow fever and Mexican troops forced the evacuation of the town.

Subsequently, Albany headed home for repairs. She left the Mexican coast on 11 July and arrived in Hampton Roads, Virginia, on 6 August. From there, she soon moved north to Boston where she completed her repairs on 27 September. On 10 October, the sloop of war put to sea to return to the Gulf of Mexico; she resumed blockade duty along the Mexican coast until March 1848, when she was sent to Venezuela to protect American citizens there during a highly volatile constitutional crisis.

=== Midshipman controversy ===
With the Mexican–American War at an end, Albany began cruising the Caribbean-West Indies region. That duty lasted until 12 September 1848, when she returned to Norfolk. During the West Indies cruise, however, John McIntosh Kell and three other passed midshipmen refused a direct order they considered demeaning: they had been ordered to light a candle to summon the relief attendant, a task generally assigned to a midshipman, not a passed midshipman. The commander, Victor M. Randolph, brought them up on charges, of which they were convicted and released from the Navy in November 1849, although all were reinstated a year later.

== Post-war cruises ==
Between 15 November 1848 and the latter part of 1853, the sloop made three more extended deployments in the Caribbean-West Indies area as a unit of the Home Squadron. In 1850, the American merchant ship North Carolina was wrecked and plundered on the coast of Puerto Rico. Her crew survived, but were imprisoned at Mayagüez. They were released when Albany threatened to bombard the town with her cannons. On 12 December 1853, Albany set sail from Boston, Massachusetts. In May 1854, the commander had filed a report with the Secretary of the Navy James C. Dobbin that the main mast of Albany was unseaworthy.

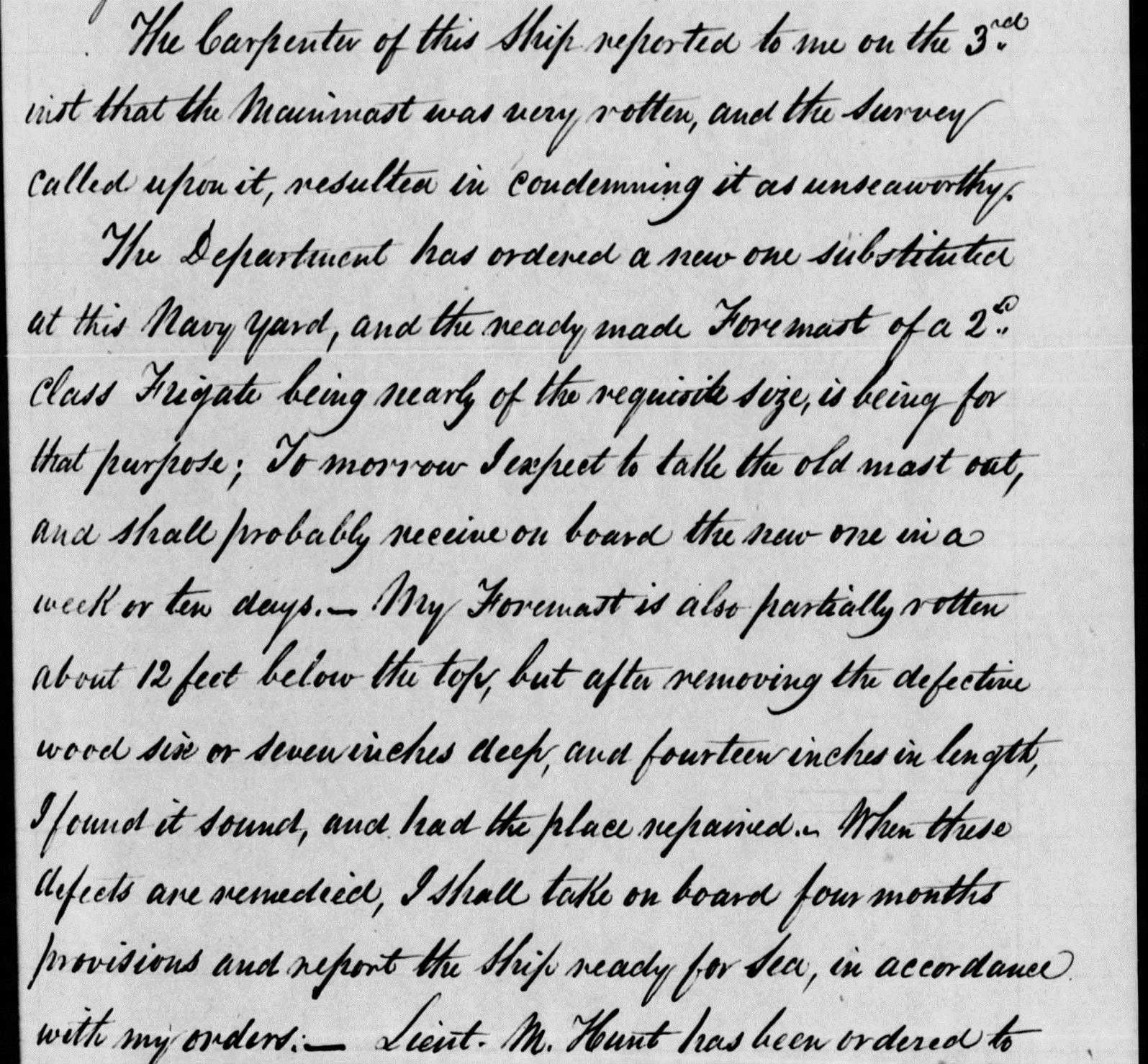
James Thompson Gerry to Commodore John Thomas Newton 23 May1854,re main mast repairs to USS Albany

On 20 May, Victor Randolph, the former commander of Albany and now commanding officer (pro tem) of the Naval Yard Warrington, reported that an appropriate mast had been identified and was ready for Albany. During the replacement of the main mast, there was also some discussion of the condition of the fore mast. Apparently both were replaced.

=== Last cruise ===
Initially, Gerry had instructions to sail to San Juan, Cartagena, and Aspinwall (now Colón, Panama), and Albany set out on 29 June. By 11 August, instructions ordered Gerry to pass along the coast and to investigate a suspicious ship lurking near Saint Thomas. Additional instructions, sent separately, told Gerry to continue patrolling the Windward Islands and Grand Turk.

Inline with its instructions, Albany arrived in Curacao on 7 September 1854, from La Guaira, Venezuela. She stayed in port for two days, and left on the morning of the 9th for Cartagena in Colombia, in what was then called New Granada. A letter from a Curacao correspondent of 19 September 1854 reported that all the crew were well. The sloop made an imposing appearance moored in the harbor and, upon leaving port, she saluted one of the forts with twenty-one guns, which was answered, and then saluted a Dutch ship, the corvette Palloo with eleven guns. On 28 September, Commander Gerry sent a report updating his superiors on the cruise, dispatched from Aspinwall. Albany departed Aspinwall, Colombia on 28–29 September 1854, intending to sail to New York. She was never seen again.

In his last letter dated 28 September 1854, Commander Gerry also informed Commodore Newton of his hazardous diplomatic mission conveying confidential documents.

the present disturbed state of this country,[Venezuela] traveling is particularly hazardous among these mountains by night, and I was very nigh experiencing this perhaps to my sorrow. At 10 P.M. when about one-half of our journey was performed, we were beset by four Bandits of whose approach my servant had given me timely notice, and being too quick for them in getting my Revolvers the cocking of which was very audible while they were advancing from the bank they had descended from towards us, they stopped upon my reining up my horse, at distance of twenty-five or thirty paces, and after a little consultation together retired again to the roadside – We passed them at this distance, but soon afterwards found them approaching rapidly, when I again stopped to make sure of my aim, they dared not advance and finally abandoned the idea.

By the November, reports circulated through coastal cities that there was much "uneasiness felt in Washington in relation to the sloop-of-war Albany," which had not been heard from since 28 September, when she left Aspinwall for New York. By early December, the steamer USS Princeton had returned from searching for the missing sloop, which had not been seen or heard from on any of the channels frequented by ship traffic of the British West Indies. In late December, a report surfaced that the vessel had arrived at Cartagena safely, but this report was apparently in error, possibly generated by the arrival of the report that Gerry had mailed before leaving Aspinwall at the end of September. By this time, the Navy's steam ships were searching the area for Albany. The steamer USS Fulton searched from January to May from Cartagena to Aspinwall, the Bay of Darien, into the Bay of Guatemala, and along the Mosquito Coast. By January 1856, after an exhaustive search of 15 months, the ship was given up as lost.

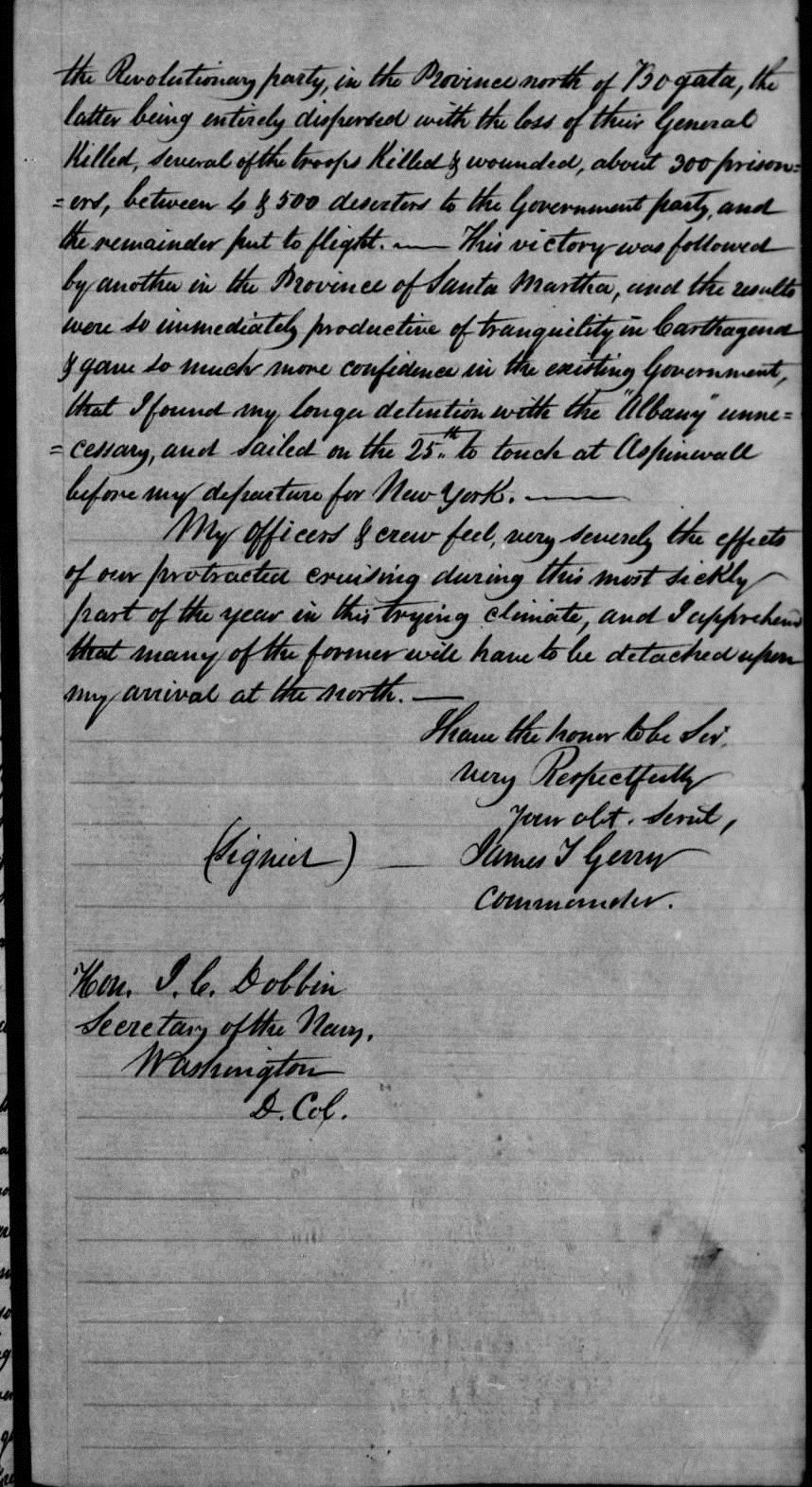
Cdr. James Thompson Gerry USN, to SecNav J. C. Dobbin 28 Sept 1854, p. 3, report his trip and the condition of the sloop USS Albany and her crew.

On 6 January 1855, after an extensive search, Commodore Newton wrote to Secretary of the Navy Dobbin to inform him of the loss of the sloop Albany and her crew. Newton stressed she was "generally understood to be a Superior, Staunch vessel – I know her to be a very fast one – She has always made the passage - Commander Gerry was not to be taken unawares; he was careful in the extreme, a good sailor and navigator - and was able to take care of his Ship - Be it as it may, Sir, our Navy expresses no slight loss in the gallant band of officers and men that formed her crew; their services have been arduous and ever well performed - "

=== Family compensation ===
The Department of the Navy requested an inquiry into the loss, which was passed on to the appropriate Senate Committee. A second craft, USS Porpoise, had been lost in a typhoon while conducting an exploratory cruise of the Bonins, the Ladrones, and the Mariana islands. By resolution of the Senate, a fund was provided for the widows and orphans of the officers, mariners, and seamen of both ships. Furthermore, the appropriate wages were paid to the families (including parents, brothers, or sisters) of the men lost, despite the loss of the account books of purser Nixon White. In the case of Rowland Leach, the ship's carpenter, this amounted to $1559, including $779 for a year's gratuitous pay ordered by the Department of the Navy.

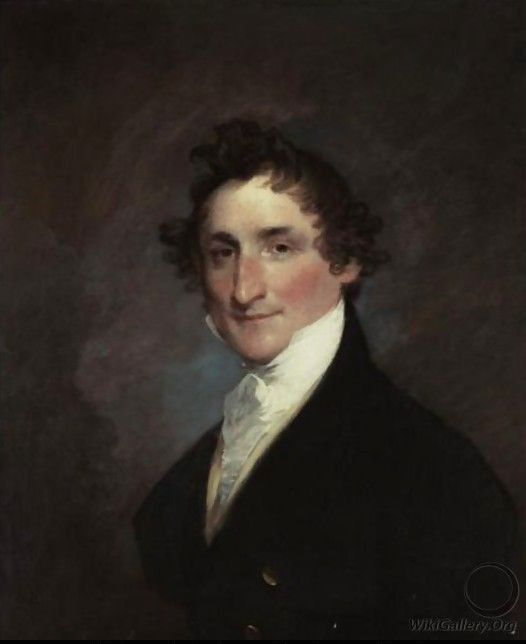
James Thompson Gerry, last commander of USS Albany

=== Partial list of the lost ===
As of 30 June 1854, the crew of Albany consisted of 18 officers, 156 seaman, and 23 Marines. It is likely the ship's complement was little changed when she was lost three months later.

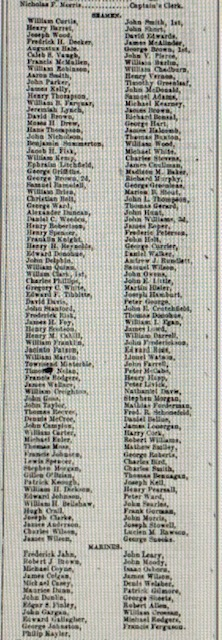
USS Albany muster roll of Seamen and Marines as of 30 June 1854, New York Daily Herald, 3 Jan 1855

The crew included several sons and grandsons of prominent men: Commander James T. Gerry, youngest son of Elbridge Gerry, former Vice President of the United States; Lieutenant John Quincy Adams, grandson of the second president and nephew of the sixth; and Midshipman Bennet Israel Riley, son of Brevet General Bennet C. Riley, former military governor of California during its statehood controversy.

== Commanders ==
- Samuel Livingston Breese, 1846–47
- John Kelly, 1847–48
- Victor M. Randolf, 1848–1850
- Charles T. Platt, 1850–1852
- James Thompson Gerry, 1853–54

== See also ==
- List of people who disappeared mysteriously at sea

== Additional information ==
- Berner, Thomas F. The Brooklyn Navy Yard. Arcadia, 1999, 9780738556956
- Kell, John McIntosh, The Civil War Naval Encyclopedia, Volume 1, ABC-CLIO, 2011. 9781598843385
- Potter, E.B. Sea Power: A Naval History. Naval Institute Press, 15 Jun 2014. 9781612517674
- Tucker, Spencer. Encyclopedia of Mexican American War: A Political, Social and Military history., ABC-CLIO, 2013.
- USS Albany Association Inc. USS Albany Organization. Tallahassee, FL.
