= Martín Perfecto de Cos =

Mexican general (1800–1854)

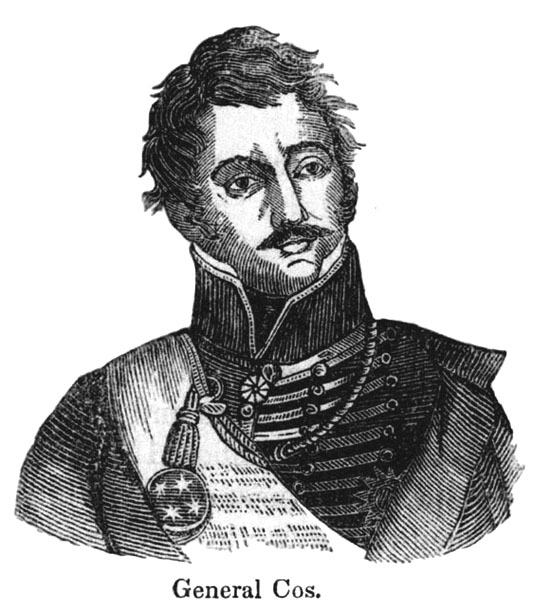

Political Chief of Tehuantepec Territory
- In office October 1853 – 1 October 1854
- Preceded by: Tomas Marín
- Succeeded by: Mariano Monterde

Personal details
- Born: 1800 Veracruz, Kingdom of Mexico, Viceroyalty of New Spain (now Veracruz, Mexico)
- Died: 1 October 1854 (aged 53–54) Minatitlán, Veracruz, Mexico

Military service
- Allegiance: Mexico
- Branch/service: Mexican Army
- Years of service: 1820–1854
- Rank: Brigadier general
- Battles/wars: Casa Mata Plan Revolution; Spanish attempts to reconquer Mexico; San Juan de Ulúa; Texas Revolution; Siege of Béxar; Battle of the Alamo; Battle of San Jacinto; Mexican Federalist Wars; Mexican–American War; First Battle of Tuxpan

Martín Perfecto de Cos (1800 – 1 October 1854) was a Mexican general and political official. Born in Veracruz, he joined the Army of the Three Guarantees in 1821 during the final phase of the Mexican War of Independence and remained a commissioned officer in the Mexican Army until his death. He held successive commands, including service in coastal islands against the last Spanish stronghold in continental America, as commander of Mexican forces in Coahuila y Tejas during the Texas Revolution, and at Tuxpan during the Mexican–American War. He died in Minatitlán while serving as political chief of the Tehuantepec Territory.

== Early life and family ==
Cos was born in Veracruz in 1800, the son of an attorney of the same name. Nineteenth-century accounts often name Cos as a brother-in-law of Antonio López de Santa Anna through a marriage to Lucinda López de Santa Anna; others call him a cousin or nephew. The relationship is alleged rather than documented.

== Early military career ==
In 1820 he entered New Spain's Veracruz regiment as a cadet, but soon switched sides by aligning with the Army of the Three Guarantees under Agustín de Iturbide and Vicente Guerrero's Plan of Iguala. During the short-lived First Mexican Empire, he adhered to the republican Plan of Casa Mata of 1 February 1823 that forced Emperor Iturbide’s abdication.

In August 1823 he was charged with the defense of the port of Veracruz, the battery at Mocambo, and the Isla de Sacrificios. Those points covered the approaches to the harbor against the Spanish garrison that still occupied the fortress of San Juan de Ulúa under Brigadier Francisco Lemaur. Spain treated Sacrificios as an outwork of Ulúa; the Mexican government treated it as national territory. Lemaur’s guns commanded the roadstead, and Mexican batteries at Mocambo were sited on the island’s anchorage. The standoff widened into a Spanish bombardment of the city in September 1823 and a Mexican naval blockade of Ulúa decreed on 8 October. The fortress surrendered only in November 1825.

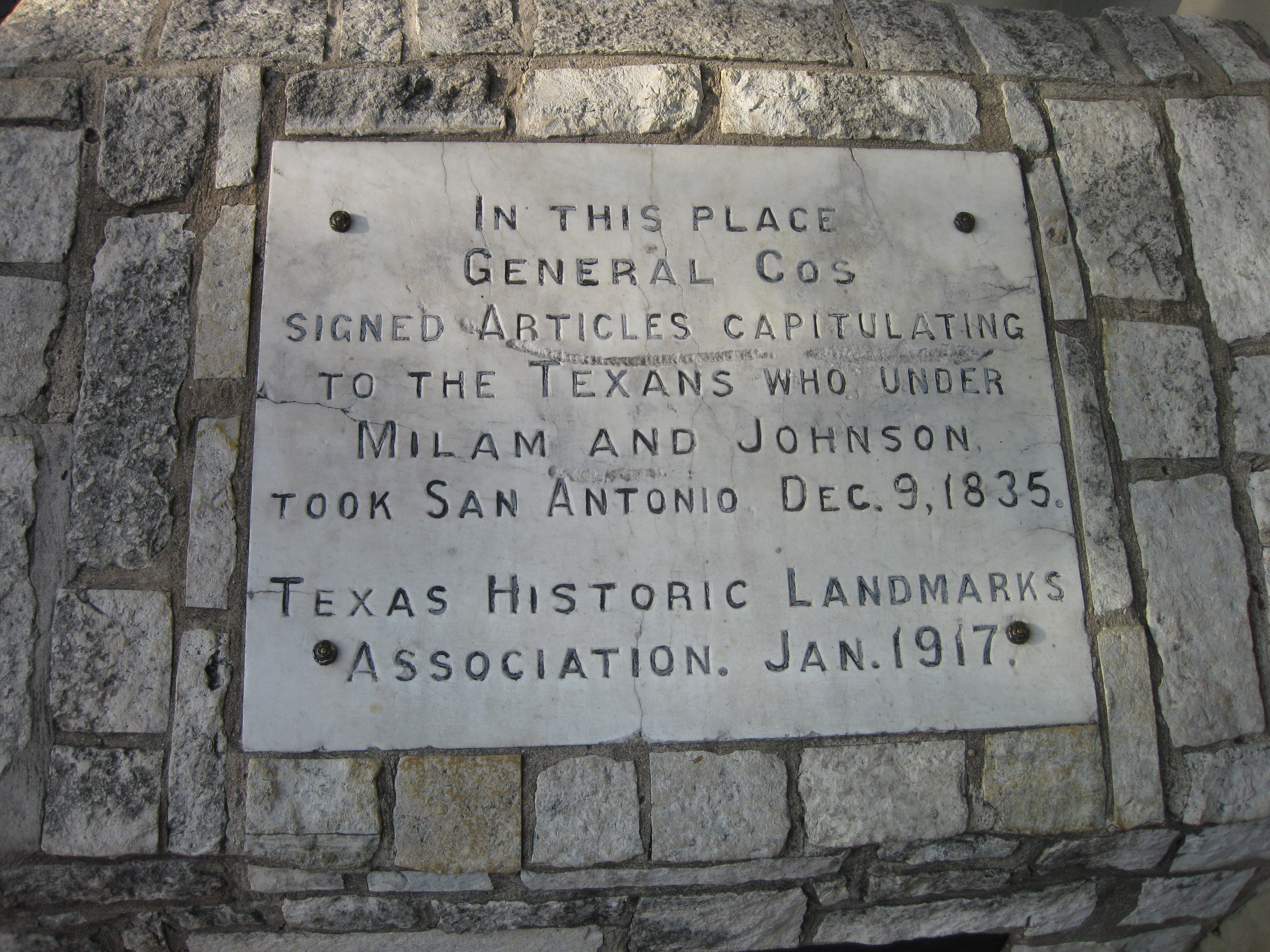
La Villita, San Antonio

== Commands in the northern frontier ==
=== Texas Revolution 1835–1836 ===
Amidst the political shift from federalism to centralism, he was promoted brigadier general in 1833. After his promotion Cos received command in the northern frontier, first from Saltillo, in the department of Coahuila y Tejas. The department was divided between the federalist legislature at Monclova and the Saltillo interest aligned with Mexico City after the Plan of Cuernavaca and the move toward the Siete Leyes.

On 12 May 1835, from Matamoros, Cos issued a manifesto backing the national government, rejecting Juan Álvarez's Plan of Texca of 23 March, the Zacatecas pronunciamiento of 30 March, and the election of Agustín Viesca as governor, and accusing the Monclova authorities of sheltering the exiled vice-president Valentín Gómez Farías.

In September Antonio López de Santa Anna ordered him into Texas to restore central authority, disarm parties in arms, and detain leading opponents of the regime, including those involved in the refusal of customs at Anahuac. Cos closed the Monclova legislature, landed several hundred men on the Texas coast at Copano or Matagorda Bay around 20–21 September, and moved inland by Goliad toward San Antonio de Béxar.

In Goliad on 1 October, he ordered the arrest of rebel leaders and garrisoned his men inside the nearby Presidio La Bahía. As early as 18 September, even before his arrival, Philip Dimmitt and James Fannin had planned to intercept Cos at either Copano or Goliad before he could reinforce Béxar; the plan was not executed, and attention turned instead to the presidio after Cos moved inland.

Cos entered Béxar in early October 1835. After the loss of Presidio La Bahía he held the town and the Alamo mission. Volunteer forces under Stephen F. Austin and later Edward Burleson besieged the place from mid-October. The two armies were closer in strength than later popular accounts allowed.

After a siege of fifty-six days and a final street assault in which Benjamin Milam was killed, Cos surrendered San Antonio de Béxar on 9–11 December 1835. Mexican casualties during the siege were about 150 killed or wounded. The capitulation let Cos and his men retire south of the Rio Grande with personal arms and one light gun, under a pledge not to take up arms against the Constitution of 1824. On the road south he joined Santa Anna’s Army of Operations at Laredo and returned north with it in the spring of 1836.

Cos re-entered Béxar with Santa Anna in February 1836. On 6 March he led a column of about 300 soldiers in the siege of the Alamo. His men assaulted the northwest corner of the mission on 6 March eventually overrunning the north wall.

On the morning of 21 April 1836 Cos reached Santa Anna’s camp on the San Jacinto with about 500 men, crossing Vince's Bridge shortly before it was destroyed. Vicente Filisola recorded that the incoming troops had marched through the night and were ordered to stack arms and rest. That afternoon Houston’s army overran the camp. Cos was taken prisoner on 24 April and later released.

Santa Anna was captured on 22 April and subsequently signed the Treaties of Velasco. These were not ratified by the Mexican Congress.

=== Gulf commands, 1838–1844 ===
In the federalist rising that spread from Tampico in October 1838 under José Urrea and José Antonio Mejía, government columns under Valentín Canalizo and Cos were defeated: Cos’s reserve broke near Tampico in late 1838, and in January 1839 he failed to take Tuxpan from Mejía. He later served as comandante principal de barlovento on the Veracruz coast. In January 1843 the Tuxpan active battalion sent its adhesion to Santa Anna through his headquarters.

== Later career ==
=== Mexican–American War ===
On 18 April 1847 Commodore Matthew C. Perry took Tuxpan with a landing force of about 1,500 sailors and marines. Cos commanded the garrison, numbered in U.S. reports at 300–400 men with river batteries and in Veracruz chronicles at about 600. After a short action the port was occupied and the works dismantled.

=== Tehuantepec ===
On 29 May 1853 the government of Santa Anna created the federal Territory of Tehuantepec from lands of Oaxaca and Veracruz, with capital at Minatitlán, in the same months as the isthmus transit concessions tied to the Gadsden Purchase. From October 1853 Cos was commandant general and political chief of the territory. He died in office at Minatitlán on 1 October 1854.

== Film depictions ==
Among the depictions of Martín Perfecto de Cos on film is that of the Mexico City-born actor Rodolfo Hoyos Jr., in the 1956 picture The First Texan, about the rise of Sam Houston in Texas. In the film, Cos orders the arrest of William B. Travis and directs his Mexican soldiers to scale the walls of The Alamo.

In the 2004 film The Alamo, General Martín Perfecto de Cos is portrayed by Francisco Philibert.
