= Battle of Tabasco =

The Battle of Tabasco may refer to two battles fought during the Mexican–American War.

- First Battle of Tabasco – fought in October, 1846
- Second Battle of Tabasco – fought in June, 1847
