= USS Scorpion (1847) =

History

United States
- Name: USS Scorpion
- Namesake: Scorpions
- Builder: Bishop and Simonson, New York, New York
- Completed: 1846
- Acquired: 7 January 1847
- Commissioned: 23 February 1847
- Decommissioned: 21 August 1848
- Fate: Sold 23 December 1848
- Notes: In commercial service as SS Aurora 1846-1847; In commercial service as SS Isthmus 1848-1854; Lost at sea 1854

General characteristics
- Type: Steamer
- Tonnage: 339
- Length: 160 ft 9 in (49.00 m)
- Beam: 24 ft 6 in (7.47 m)
- Draft: 8 ft 0 in (2.44 m)
- Propulsion: Steam
- Speed: 7.5 knots
- Complement: 60
- Armament: 2 × 8-inch (203-millimeter) guns; 2 × 18-pounder carronades

The third USS Scorpion was a steamer in commission in the United States Navy from 1847 to 1848.

Scorpion was built in 1846 as the commercial steamship SS Aurora by Bishop and Simonson at New York City for Sidney Mason and William D. Thompson. The U.S. Navy purchased Aurora at New York on 7 January 1847 for use in the Mexican War and commissioned her as USS Scorpion on 23 February 1847 with Commander Abraham Bigelow in command.

Ordered to the Gulf of Mexico, Scorpion joined the Home Squadron at Anton Lizardo, Mexico, on 27 April 1847. She participated in the expedition against Tabasco on 16 June 1847 at the Second Battle of Tabasco, serving as the flagship for Commodore Matthew C. Perry.

Scorpion returned to Anton Lizardo on 25 July 1847, and for the remainder of the war patrolled the coast of Mexico. At the close of the war, she sailed for the Brooklyn Navy Yard in Brooklyn, New York, arriving there on 11 August 1848. She was decommissioned on 21 August 1848 and sold at auction on 23 December 1848.

Once again in civilian service, she became the merchant steamer Isthmus, and was lost at sea in 1854.
