= USS Scourge (1846) =

Gunboat of the United States Navy

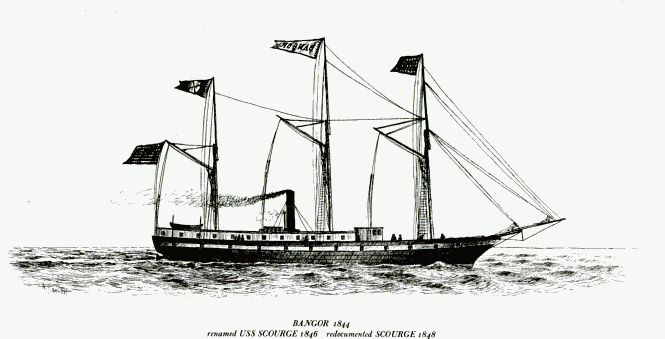
- SS Bangor, USS Scourge

History

United States
- Name: SS Bangor
- Ordered: Bangor Steam Navigation Co.
- Builder: Betts, Harlan, and Hollingsworth
- Launched: 29 May 1845
- Fate: Sold to U.S. Government on 30 December 1846

History

United States
- Name: USS Scourge
- Acquired: 30 December 1846
- Commissioned: 1846
- Decommissioned: 1848
- Fate: Sold to revolutionaries of Venezuela on 7 October 1848 and seized by State of Venezuela in 1848

General characteristics
- Type: Gunboat
- Displacement: 231 long tons (235 t)
- Length: 120 ft (37 m)
- Beam: 23 ft (7.0 m)
- Draft: 9 ft (2.7 m)
- Propulsion: Steam engine
- Speed: 10.5 knots (19.4 km/h; 12.1 mph)
- Complement: 50 officers and enlisted
- Armament: 1 × 32-pounder gun; 2 × 24-pounder carronades

USS Scourge was a steamer warship in service during the Mexican–American War (1846–1848). She was the third United States Navy ship of that name.

== Acquisition ==
The ship was launched on 29 May 1845 by Betts, Harlan, and Hollingsworth of Wilmington, Delaware as merchant steamer Bangor. She was powered by twin screws and was the first iron-hulled, sea-going merchant vessel in the United States. She ran between Bangor and Boston in 1845 and 1846. On 1 September 1846 Bangor caught on fire and was run aground. She was rebuilt and continued the Bangor-Boston route and she was bought by the U.S. Government on 30 December 1846 for the Mexican War. Once equipped, she was renamed Scourge.

== Service ==
USS Scourge joined the forces of Commodore Matthew C. Perry in the Gulf of Mexico on March 29, 1847. She was part of the "Mosquito Flotilla" and was immediately assigned to take part in a concerted sea-land attack upon the port of Alvarado.

- On 7 March 1847, commanded by Lt Charles G. Hunter USS Scourge took part in the attack on the city of Vera Cruz, Mexico.
- On 30 March, USS Scourge anchored near the port of Alvarado. Lt Hunter demanded unconditional surrender of the port next morning and Alvarado surrounded the same day, letting Hunter know that the Mexican troops left the town before his arrival. USS Scourge ran up the river, capturing four vessels on her way. Among them was schooner Relampago. Next morning USS Scourge arrived to city of Flacotalpam, its authorities complied with Lt Hunter's demand to surrender the city too. During the course of capturing Alvarado and Tlacotalpan Lt Hunter was found by the Court Martial guilty of disobeying orders and treating his superior with contempt and relieved of the command of USS Scourge.
- On 18 April, USS Scourge commanded by Lt S. Lockwood took part in the capture of the city of Tuxpan.
- In June, USS Scourge took part in the Second Battle of Tabasco. Previous to the attack on Tabasco, Lt Lockwood became one of the first officers to protect a vessel's exposed machinery by using sandbags.
- On 30 June, the village of Tamultay, Mexico, which was reported to be the headquarters of General Echegaray, was taken by U.S. naval land forces with support from USS Scourge and USS Vixen.
- In March 1848, USS Scourge (under the command of Lt A. Taylor) captured the Mexican merchant vessel San Pablo.

USS Scourge also participated in the captures of La Peña, Palma Sola, and Hospital Hill.

== After the war ==
Scourge was sold in New Orleans, Louisiana to the Venezuelan revolutionaries on 7 October 1848. She was seized by State of Venezuela later that year.
