= USS Glaucus =

Gunboat of the United States Navy

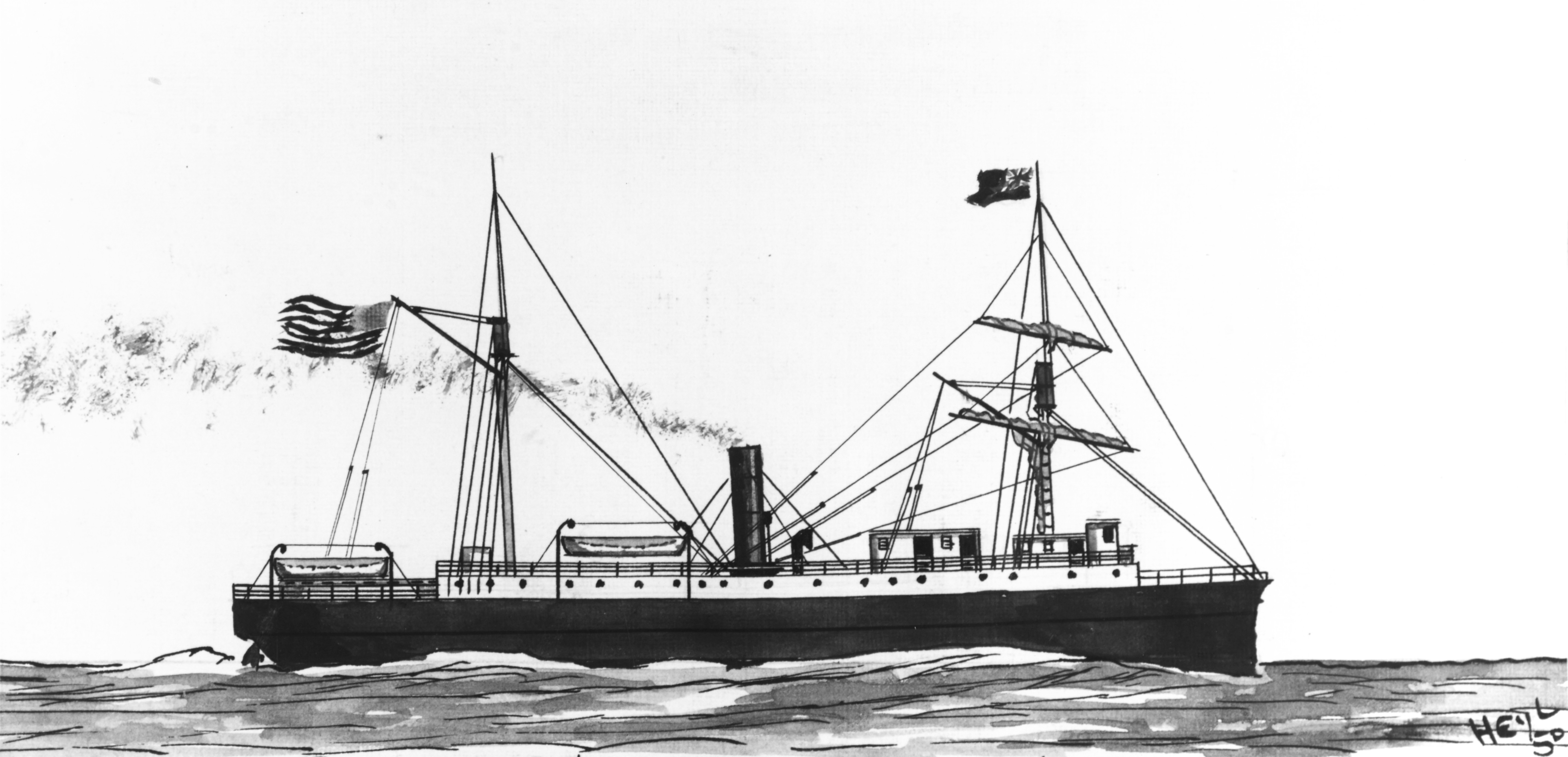
- Glaucus in post-Civil War merchant service as Worcester

History

United States
- Name: USS Glaucus
- Owner: Neptune Steamship Company (1863); United States Navy (1863–65); Baltimore & Liverpool SS Co. (1865–73); Boston parties (1873–94)
- Operator: See owners
- Builder: Van Deusen Bros., New York
- Cost: $160,000
- Launched: 11 Feb 1863
- Completed: 1864
- Acquired: 17 Jul 1863
- Commissioned: 18 Feb 1864
- Decommissioned: 11 Jun 1864
- Out of service: 1894
- Stricken: 1865 (est.)
- Fate: Scrapped, 1894

General characteristics
- Displacement: 1,244 tons
- Length: 209 ft (64 m)
- Beam: 35 ft 6 in (10.82 m)
- Depth of hold: 20 ft 8 in (6.30 m)
- Installed power: Inverted direct-acting steam engine
- Propulsion: Single screw, auxiliary sails
- Sail plan: Schooner
- Speed: 10 knots
- Complement: 160
- Armament: one 100-pounder Parrott rifle; two 30-pounder rifles; eight 8" guns

USS Glaucus was a large steamship acquired by the Union Navy during the American Civil War. The Union Navy planned to use her as a gunboat in the blockade of ports of the Confederate States of America, but, also found it useful to use her to transport the president of Colombia to Cartagena, Colombia.

On her return to blockade duty, Glaucus experienced a fire and several groundings, but managed to make it through to the end of the war.

== Service history ==
Glaucus, a screw steamer, was in the process of being built by the Van Duesen Brothers in New York City for the Neptune Steamship Company when she was purchased on behalf of the U.S. Navy on 17 July 1863 by Rear Admiral F. H. Gregory; and commissioned 18 February 1864, Comdr. C. H. B. Caldwell in command.

Glaucus was assigned to the North Atlantic Blockading Squadron, but before assuming her duties she was chosen to transport Senor Manuel Murillo, newly elected President of Colombia, to Cartagena. She departed 5 March from New York and arrived Cartagena 16 March.

Returning to Beaufort, North Carolina, 3 May 1864, Glaucus took up blockading station off Cape Fear River. On 28 May, while pursuing a blockade runner off the Western Bar, Glaucus caught fire and was nearly destroyed. The crew managed to control the flames, however; and she proceeded to Philadelphia, Pennsylvania, for repairs, arriving 9 June 1864 and decommissioning 11 June.

Repaired and recommissioned 22 August 1864, she broke down on her way to New York City, and had to again undergo extensive repairs. Sailing to join the West India Convoy Fleet, she grounded near Molasses Reef in the Bahamas, and had to be towed 30 May 1865.

She was decommissioned 6 June 1865.

== Post war ==
After the end of the Civil War she was sold at auction 12 June 1865 to John Henderson of the Baltimore & Ohio Railroad, who was bidding for a mail service running between Baltimore and Liverpool. The railroad owned the Baltimore & Liverpool Steamship Co. under whose flag she operated. The Railroad bought 4 ships from the Navy; she was renamed Worcester. The other three vessels were the Allegany, the Carroll, and the Somerset; the Railroad decided to retain or change the names to Maryland counties. The vessels were originally built for coastal use, however the new owner set out to use them for carrying freight and mails on the transatlantic routes. On 29 November 1865 she sailed on her maiden voyage from Baltimore for Liverpool returning to Baltimore with engine trouble. On 23 December 1865 on her next attempt she completed the round voyage to Liverpool. On 29 May 1867 sailing from Liverpool she lost her propeller, and had to return to Queenstown (Cobh) necessitating on 4 June being towed to Liverpool for repairs. The last Baltimore - Liverpool - Baltimore run started on 15 September 1868 and the service was then closed down, the Worcester having made 12 round-trip voyages. During the winter of 1868-9 she operated between Baltimore and New York and was then laid up. In 1873 she was sold to Boston owners and sailed between Boston, Halifax and Prince Edward Island, before being scrapped at Boston, Massachusetts, in 1894.
