= Tehuantepec Territory =

Mexican territory (1853–1857)

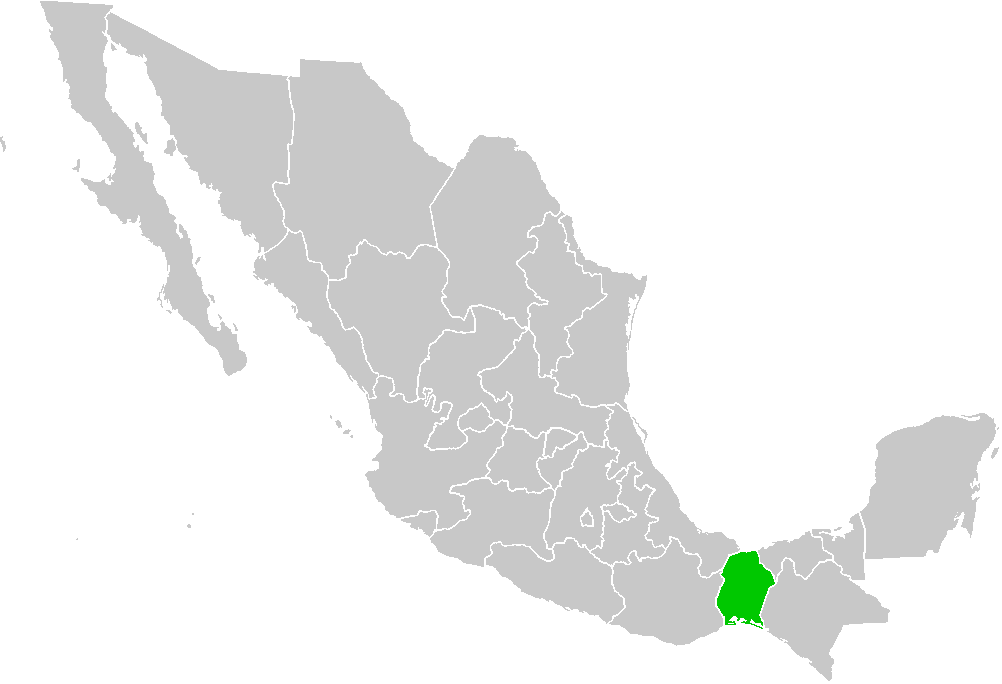
The territory within Mexico.

The Tehuantepec Territory (Spanish: Territorio de Tehuantepec) was a federal territory of Mexico in the Isthmus of Tehuantepec. It existed between 1853 and 1857.

== History ==
On 29 May 1853, the territory was established by president Antonio López de Santa Anna, at request of Gregorio Meléndez ("Che Gorio Melendre"), a local ruler of the town of Juchitán who assisted Santa Anna in his seizure of power. The states of Oaxaca and Veracruz ceded area for the formation of the territory. The port of Minatitlán located in the Gulf of Mexico was the capital. Santa Anna hoped to construct a railroad or canal on the isthmus, though this plan was proven to be unfeasible.

With the proclamation of the Constitution of 1857, two years after the fall of Santa Anna, the territory was dissolved and reintegrated into its predecessor states.
