= First Battle of Tabasco =

1846 Mexican–American War battle

Coordinates: 17°59′21″N 92°55′41″W

- Part of Mexican–American War
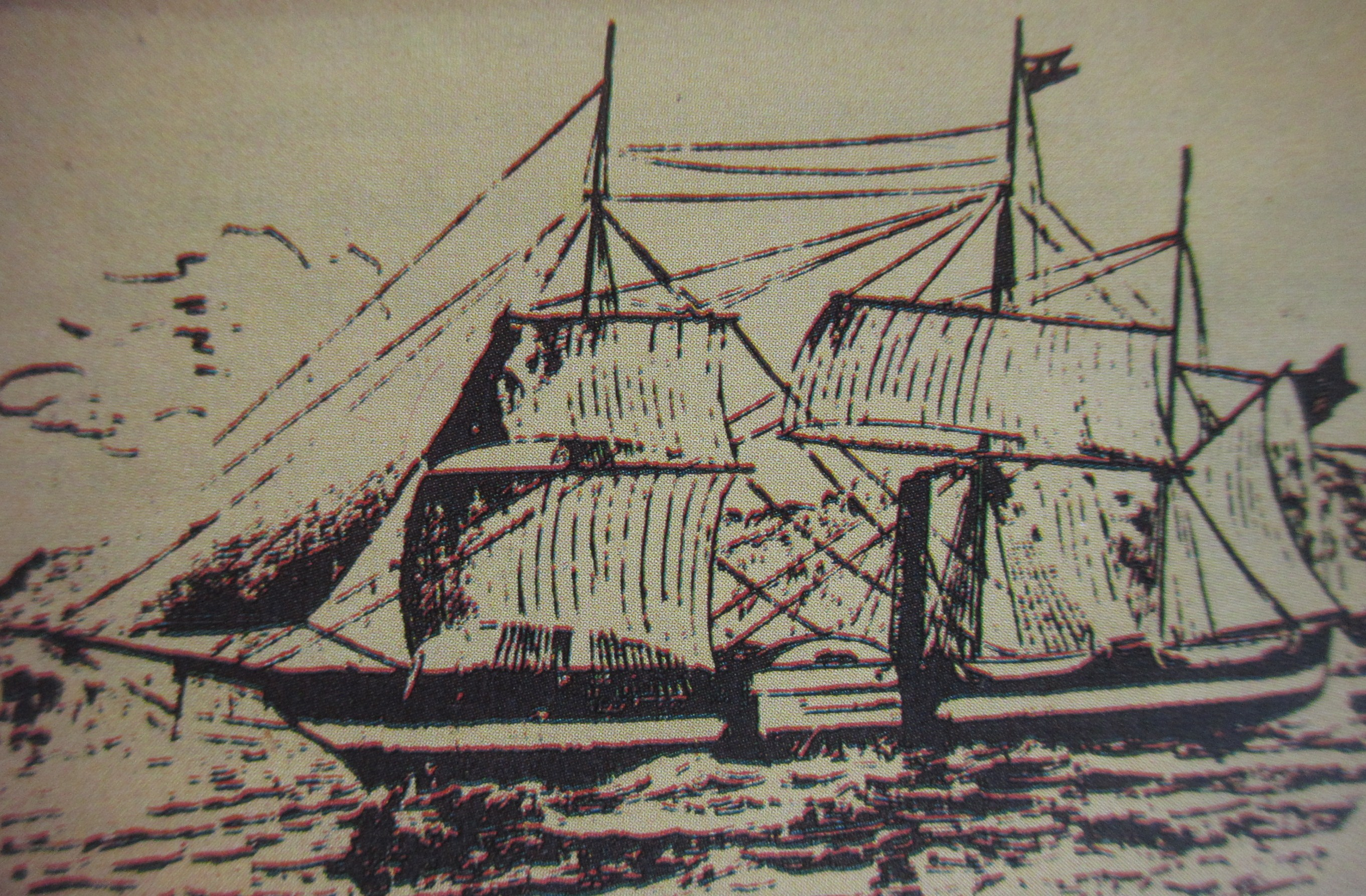
- Mississippi, Commodore Perry's flagship during the First Battle of Tabasco.
Date	October 24–26, 1846
Location	Villahermosa, Tabasco
Result	Mexican victory

Belligerents
United States	Mexico

Commanders and leaders
Matthew C. Perry; French Forrest	Juan B. Traconis

Strength
7 ships 700 landing force	253

Casualties and losses
2 killed 2 wounded 2 drowned	5 killed

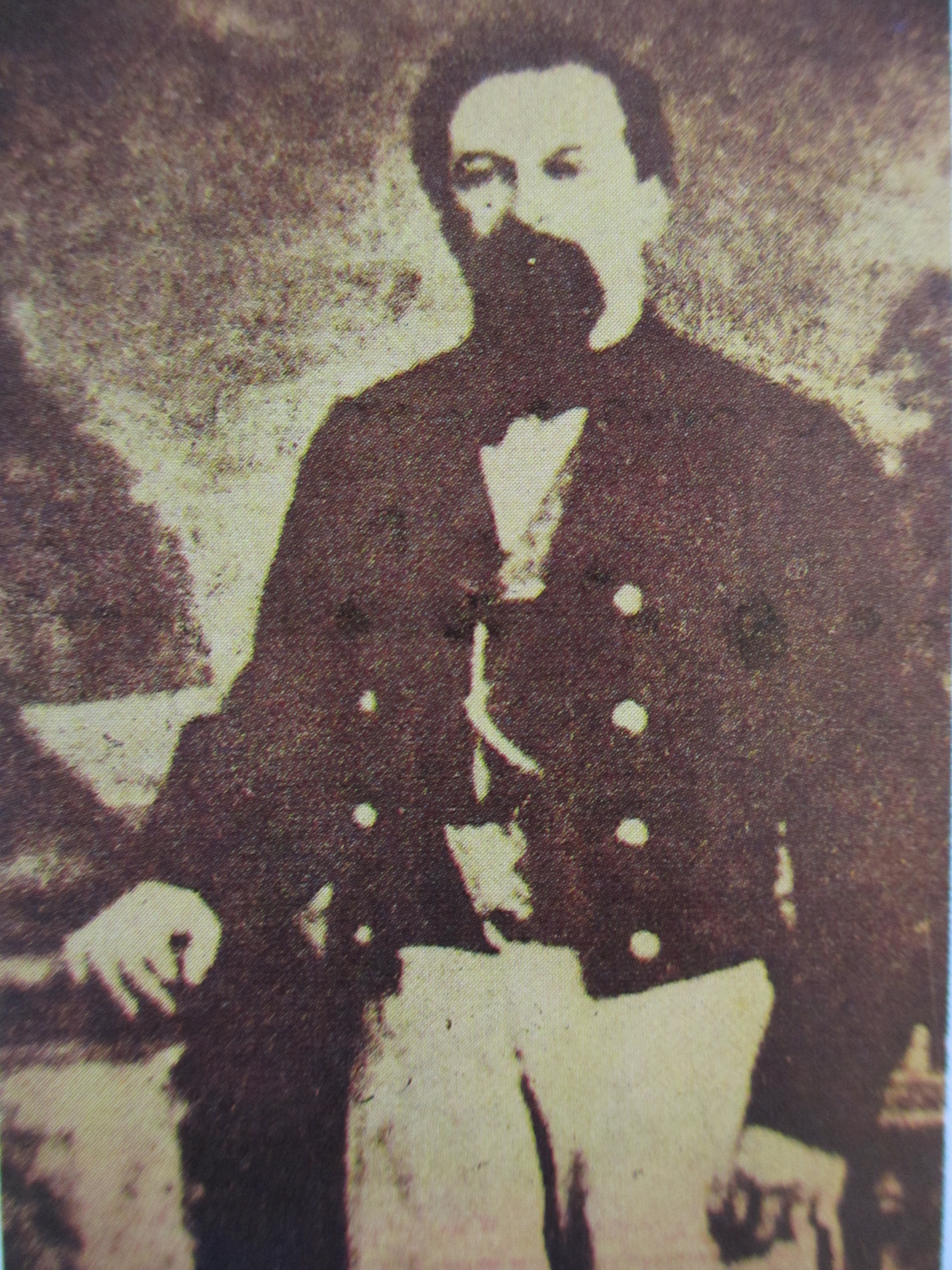
Colonel Juan Bautista Traconis, governor and military commander of Tabasco

The First Battle of Tabasco was fought during the Mexican–American War, in October 1846, in an attempt to capture cities along the Tabasco coast.

== Background ==
Commodore David Conner of the Home Squadron, received orders from Secretary of the Navy George Bancroft to "exercise all the rights that belong to you as commander-in-chief of a belligerent squadron" in establishing a blockade of the Mexican east coast. On 14 May 1846, Conner established his base at Anton Lizardo, Veracruz and placed Veracruz, Alvarado, Tampico, and Matamoros under blockade. Commodore Matthew C. Perry was named as Conner's replacement in the fall of 1846, and suggested capturing "Tabasco", otherwise known as San Juan Bautista along the Tabasco River. On 16 October, Perry left Anton Lizardo with the steamboats Mississippi, Vixen and McLane and the schooners Reefer, Bonita, Nonata, and Forward. On 23 October, Perry captured Frontera and moved upriver, finding Tabasco the next morning at 9 am.

== Battle ==
Lt. Col. Juan B. Traconis withdrew his 700 men from the town allowing Perry to occupy the town by 5 pm, capturing five Mexican vessels. However, at night, Perry recalled his landing party and Traconis's forces returned to the city, barricading themselves inside buildings. Traconis received a delegation of U.S. Marines who requested their surrender, but responded "Tell Commodore Perry that I would sooner die with my garrison before handing over this place."

Perry realized that a bombardment of the city was the only option to drive out the Mexican troops, but would harm noncombatants, so he decided to retreat to Frontera with his prizes. On the morning of October 26, the Mexicans started firing on Perry's ships who replied in kind. As the U.S. troops began to bombard the town, the flagpole of the Mexican headquarters was shot through and fell. The Americans, believing that this signalled a surrender, stopped firing and sent a delegation to investigate, receiving the same answer as before from Traconis, who then fixed the flagpole to the tower of the Church, and the battle recommenced, continuing until evening. The foreign merchants asked for a ceasefire, which Perry complied with, but when one of his prizes was grounded and then fired upon, Perry once again returned fire, while continuing on to Frontera.

== Aftermath ==
Perry managed to establish a naval blockade with the U.S. Revenue Cutters McLane and Forward. after many preceding failures. Perry would return and successfully capture Tabasco in 1847.

== See also ==
- Second Battle of Tabasco
- List of battles of the Mexican–American War

== References used ==
- Bauer, K. Jack (1974). The Mexican–American War, 1846–1848. New York: Macmillan Publishing Co., Inc. ISBN 0-80-326107-1.
