= First Battle of Tuxpan =

1847 battle during the Mexican–American War

- Part of Mexican–American War
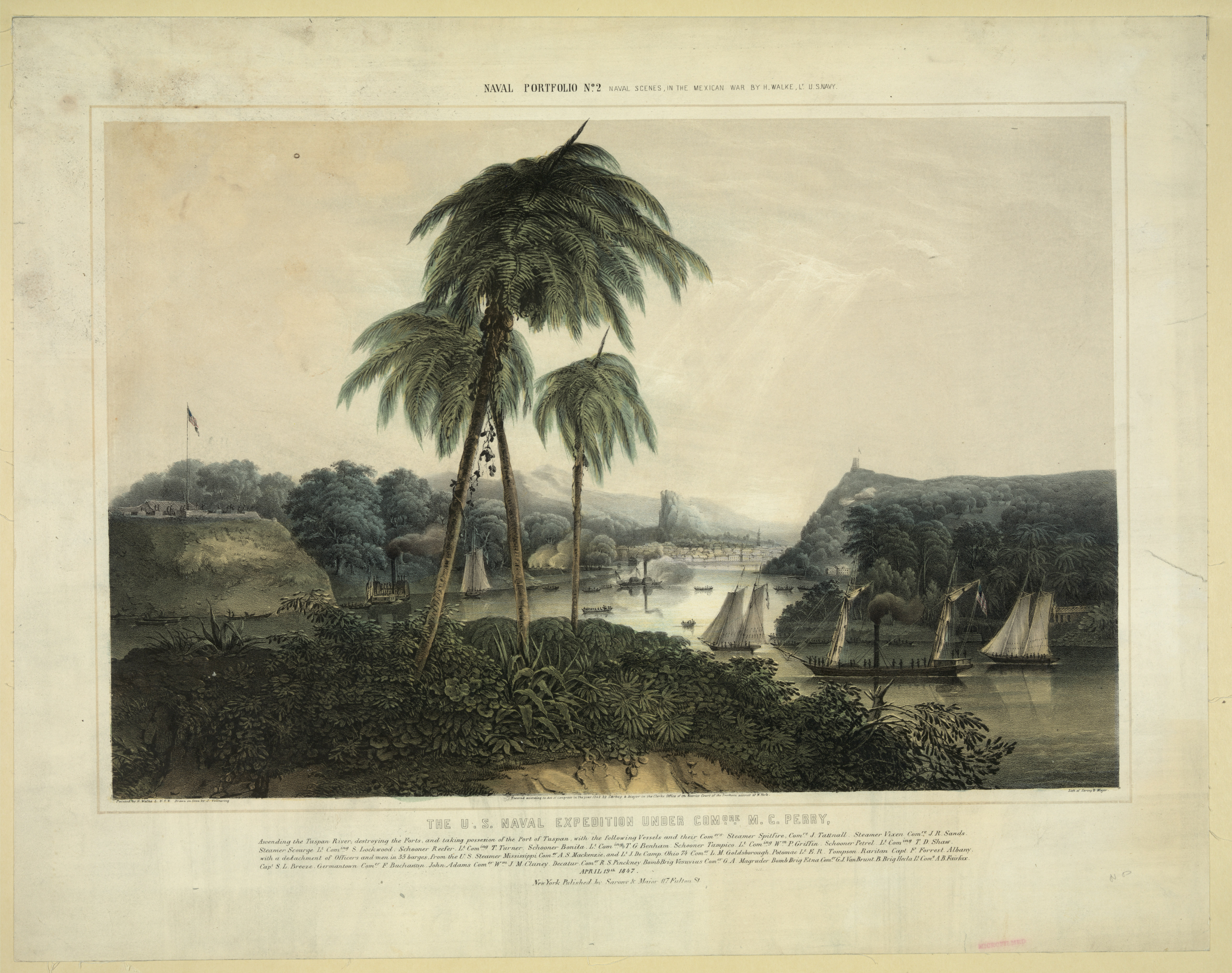
- The U.S. naval expedition under Commodore M. C. Perry, ascending the Tuspan River; destroying the forts, and taking possession of the port of Tuspan
Date	18 April 1847
Location	Tuxpan, Veracruz
Result	United States victory

Belligerents
United States	Mexico

Commanders and leaders
Matthew C. Perry	Martin Perfecto de Cos

Strength
1,519 marines (part of Mosquito Fleet)	300–400

Casualties and losses
3 killed 11 wounded	Unknown, likely many

The First Battle of Tuxpan was the only major battle fought during the Mexican–American War at Tuxpan, Mexico.

== Background ==
Commodore Matthew C. Perry's Home Squadron extended its blockade of Mexico's eastern ports to include Tuxpan and Tabasco, more commonly known as Villahermosa. Perry's Mosquito Fleet carrying a landing force of 1,519 men and four pieces of artillery, reached the mouth of the Tuxpan River on 17 April. The Mexicans had five batteries with eight guns each, and about 400 men under the command of General Martin Perfecto de Cos, along the six mile approach to the town.

== Battle ==
On 18 April, Perry's craft towed 30 barges upriver, and secured two downriver fortifications and those at the edge of town by 3 PM. The town surrendered by 4 PM, when Perry removed the guns and destroyed the fortifications before evacuating the town on 22 April, keeping a pair of craft to blockade the river.
