= Second Battle of Tabasco =

1847 Mexican–American War battle

Coordinates: 17°59′21″N 92°55′41″W

- Part of Mexican–American War
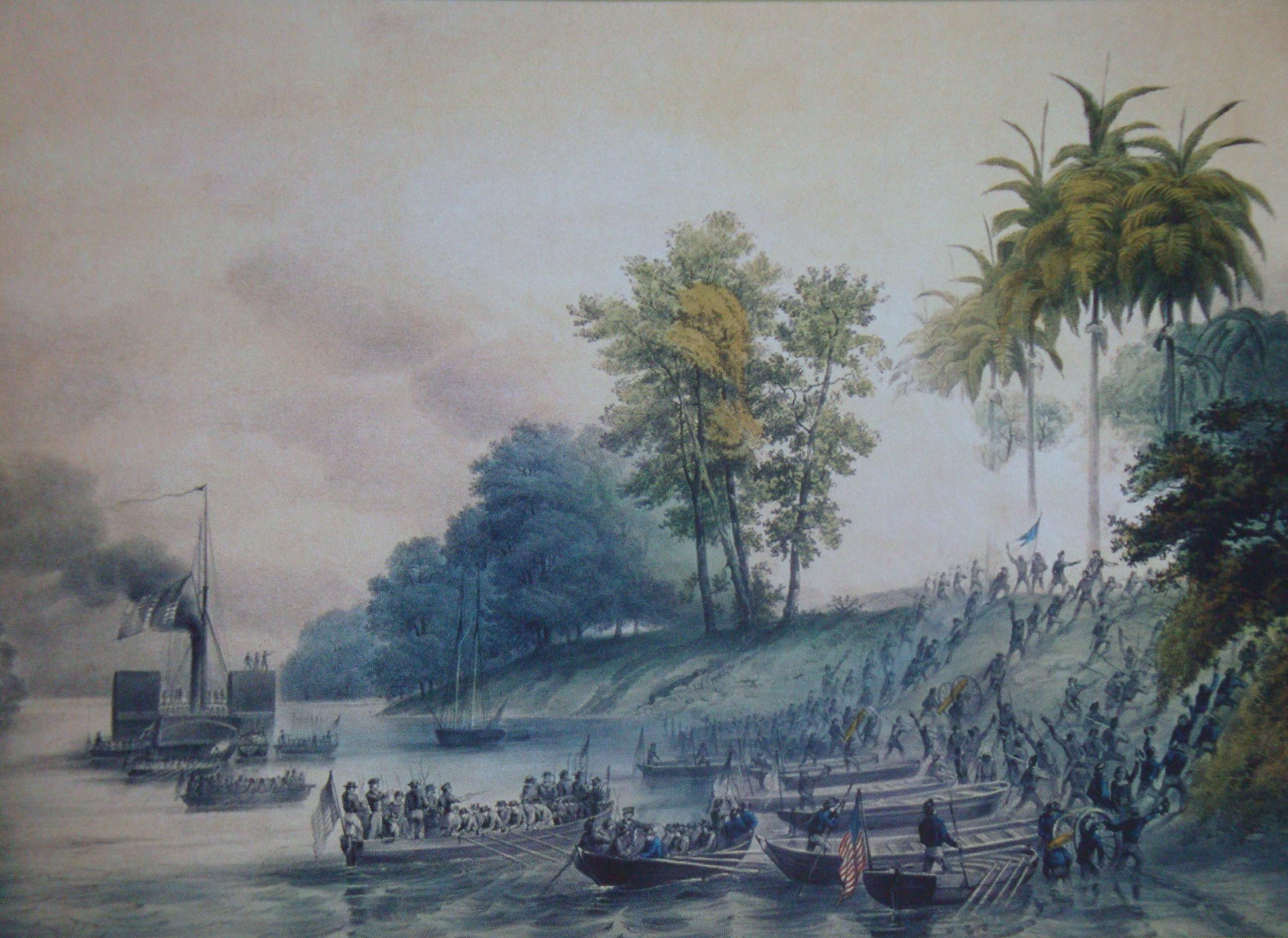
- American landing in San Juan Bautista (Villahermosa today) during the Second Battle of Tabasco
Date	June 15–16, 1847
Location	Villahermosa, Tabasco
Result	U.S. victory

Belligerents
United States	Mexico

Commanders and leaders
Matthew C. Perry; David D. Porter	Domingo Echagaray; Claro Hidalgo

Strength
8 vessels 1,050 U.S. Marines; 7 field artillery pieces	600+ Soldiers

Casualties and losses
6 wounded, 3 missing	about 30

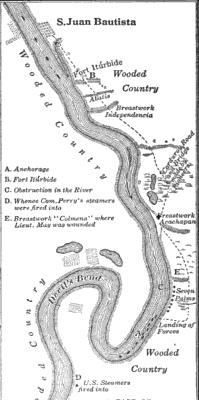
Map depicting events along the path to San Juan Bautista

The Second Battle of Tabasco, also known as the Battle of Villahermosa, was fought in June 1847 during the Mexican–American War as part of the U.S. blockade of Mexican Gulf ports.

== Background ==
Commodore Matthew C. Perry, commander of the U.S. Home Squadron had recently captured the port cities of Tuxpan and Carmen. He next decided to move against the city of San Juan Bautista (present day Villahermosa), the capital of the state of Tabasco. Perry had made an attempt to capture San Juan Bautista the previous year, but was not successful.

Perry had received reports in April that the Mexican commander in Tabasco, Col. Domingo Echagaray, had strengthened the city's defenses and built obstructions in the Tabasco River (present day Grijalva River). Perry assembled the Mosquito Fleet, consisting of the steamboats Scourge, Scorpion, Spitfire, and Vixen, plus the brigs Washington, Stromboli, and Vesuvius, and the merchant schooner Spitfire, off Frontera on 14 June and began moving upstream, towing 40 ship's boats carrying 1,050 men and seven surfboats with a field piece each.

== Battle ==
At 4:15 PM, near Santa Teresa, 12 miles (19 km) below San Juan Bautista, the fleet ran through an ambush with little difficulty. At 5:45 PM, at an "s" curve in the river known as the "Devil's Bend", Perry encountered Mexican fire from the chaparral, dispersed some cavalry with Vesuvius, and anchored for the night intending to deal with the obstructions ahead during daylight the next day. At dusk, a lone Mexican shot one of Perry's men on Vesuvius's forecastle.

On 16 June, while investigating the obstructions, one of Perry's lieutenants, William May, was wounded, and Perry decided to lead ashore 1,173 men and ten pieces of artillery. They quickly took Acachapan, when Col. Claro Hidalgo's 600 men fled, abandoning their uneaten breakfasts.

In the meantime Lieutenant David D. Porter, on board Spitfire, managed to remove the piles obstructing the river and move the steamers past by 10 AM. At one point just as Perry was approaching the Mexican defenses, Porter opened fire on them mistaking the Americans for the Mexicans. The mistake was quickly remedied, and Porter kept on moving upriver, soon reaching Fort Iturbide guarding the city from the riverbank. Two ships, Scorpion and Spitfire, ran past the fort and began shelling it from the rear. Porter led 68 men ashore, seized the fort, and raised the American flag. The steamers continued on to capture the town, raising the U.S. flag over the governor's house by 11:50 AM. Perry and the landing force arrived at 3:30 PM.

== Aftermath ==
The last Mexican port on the Gulf coast had been captured. Colonel Echagaray withdrew further upstream to Tamulte with 111 soldiers and 115 civilians, but guerrilla bands lingered behind. Perry left a garrison in Tabasco, under the command of Commander Gershom J. Van Brunt, but yellow fever and the constant presence of guerrillas persuaded Perry to withdraw the garrison on 22 July, but maintained the blockade at Frontera, periodically patrolling the river.

In the aftermath of the U.S. victory, a movement in the states of Tabasco and Chiapas arose which sought to break the two states from Mexico and join with Guatemala, but Perry withheld support, and the movement eventually died off.

== See also ==
- First Battle of Tabasco
- List of battles of the Mexican–American War
