= Matthew C. Perry =

United States Navy officer (1794–1858)

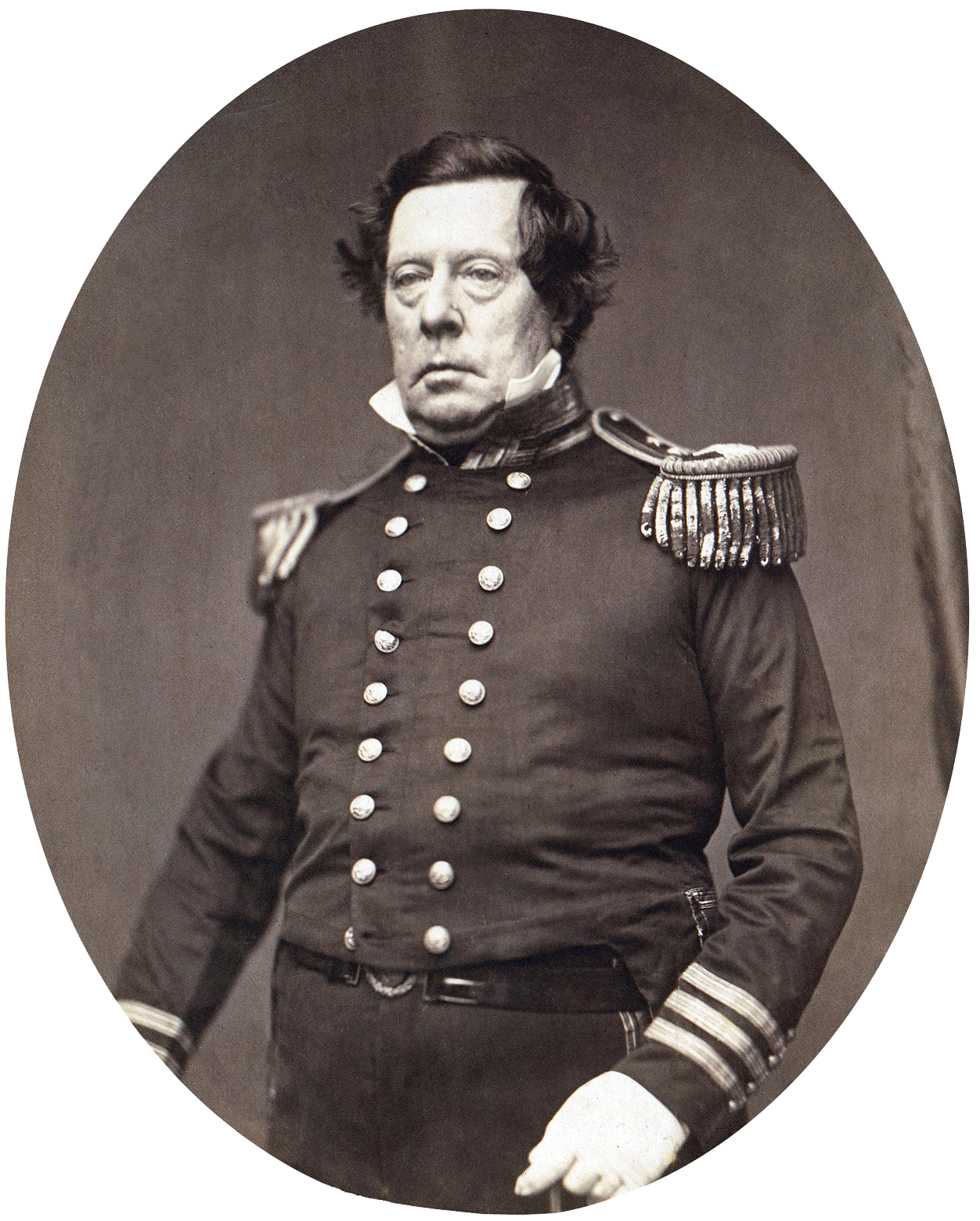
- Perry in c. 1856–1858

Commander of the East India Squadron
- In office November 20, 1852 – September 6, 1854
- Preceded by: John H. Aulick
- Succeeded by: Joel Abbot

Personal details
- Born: Matthew Calbraith Perry; April 10, 1794 Newport, Rhode Island, U.S.
- Died: March 4, 1858 (aged 63) New York City, U.S.
- Spouse: Jane Slidell Perry (m. 1814)
- Children: 10
- Parents: Christopher Perry (father); Sarah Wallace Alexander (mother)

Military service
- Allegiance: United States
- Branch/service: United States Navy
- Years of service: 1809–1858
- Rank: Commodore
- Commands: USS Shark; Africa Squadron; USS Fulton; New York Navy Yard; USS Mississippi; Mosquito Fleet; USS President
- Battles/wars: Little Belt affair; War of 1812; USS President vs HMS Belvidera; Second Barbary War; Suppression of the Slave Trade; Battle of Little Bereby; Opening of Japan; Mexican–American War; First Battle of Tabasco; Siege of Veracruz; First Battle of Tuxpan; Second Battle of Tuxpan; Third Battle of Tuxpan; Second Battle of Tabasco

Matthew Calbraith Perry (April 10, 1794 – March 4, 1858) was a United States Navy officer who commanded ships in several wars, including the War of 1812 and the Mexican–American War. He led the Perry Expedition that ended Japan's isolationism and signed the Convention of Kanagawa between Japan and the United States in 1854.

Perry was interested in the education of naval officers and assisted in the development of an apprentice system that helped establish the curriculum at the United States Naval Academy. With the advent of the steam engine, he became a leading advocate of modernizing the U.S. Navy and came to be considered "The Father of the Steam Navy" in the United States.

== Lineage ==
Matthew Perry was a member of the Perry family, a son of Sarah Wallace (née Alexander) (1768–1830) and Navy Captain Christopher Raymond Perry (1761–1818). He was born April 10, 1794, in Newport, Rhode Island. His siblings included Oliver Hazard Perry, Raymond Henry Jones Perry, Sarah Wallace Perry, Anna Marie Perry (mother of George Washington Rodgers), James Alexander Perry, Nathaniel Hazard Perry, and Jane Tweedy Perry (who married William Butler).

His mother was born in County Down, Ireland and was a descendant of an uncle of William Wallace, the Scottish knight and landowner. His paternal grandparents were James Freeman Perry, a surgeon, and Mercy Hazard, a descendant of Governor Thomas Prence, a co-founder of Eastham, Massachusetts, who was a political leader in both the Plymouth and Massachusetts Bay colonies, and governor of Plymouth; and a descendant of Mayflower passengers, both of whom were signers of the Mayflower Compact, Elder William Brewster, the Pilgrim colonist leader and spiritual elder of the Plymouth Colony, and George Soule, through Susannah Barber Perry.

== Naval career ==
In 1809, around age 15, Perry received a midshipman's warrant in the Navy and was initially assigned to USS Revenge, under the command of his elder brother. He was then assigned to USS President, where he served as an aide to Commodore John Rodgers. President attacked the neutral Royal Navy post ship HMS Little Belt in the Little Belt affair. Perry continued to serve aboard President during the War of 1812 and was present at her inconclusive engagement with HMS Belvidera on August 23, 1812. One of President's cannon burst during the engagement, killing and wounding several men including Perry. Perry subsequently transferred to USS United States and saw little active service for the rest the war since his ship was blockaded at New London, Connecticut by the British navy.

Following the signing of the Treaty of Ghent which ended the war, Perry served on various vessels in the Mediterranean Sea. Perry served under Commodore William Bainbridge during the Second Barbary War. He then served in African waters aboard USS Cyane during its patrol off Liberia from 1819 to 1820. After that cruise, Perry was sent to suppress piracy and the slave trade in the West Indies.

=== Opening of Key West ===
From 1821 to 1825, Perry placed in commission and commanded USS Shark, a schooner with 12 guns. He was sent to the West Africa Station as part of the Anglo-American blockade of Africa to suppress the Atlantic slave trade.

In 1815, the Spanish governor in Havana deeded the island of Key West to Juan Pablo Salas of St. Augustine in Spanish Florida. After Florida was transferred to the United States, Salas sold Key West to American businessman John W. Simonton for $2,000 in 1821. Simonton lobbied Washington to establish a naval base on Key West, both to take advantage of its strategic location and to bring law and order to the area.

On March 25, 1822, Perry sailed Shark to Key West and planted the U.S. flag, physically claiming the Florida Keys as United States territory. Perry renamed Cayo Hueso "Thompson's Island" for the Secretary of the Navy Smith Thompson and the harbor "Port Rodgers" for the president of the Board of Navy Commissioners. Neither name stuck however.

From 1826 to 1827, Perry acted as fleet captain for Commodore Rodgers. In 1828, Perry returned to Charleston, South Carolina, for shore duty. In 1830, he took command of a sloop-of-war, USS Concord. During this period, while in port in Russian Kronstadt, Perry was offered a commission in the Imperial Russian Navy, which he declined.

He spent 1833 to 1837 as second officer of the New York Navy Yard, later the Brooklyn Navy Yard, gaining a promotion to captain at the end of this tour.

=== Father of the Steam Navy ===
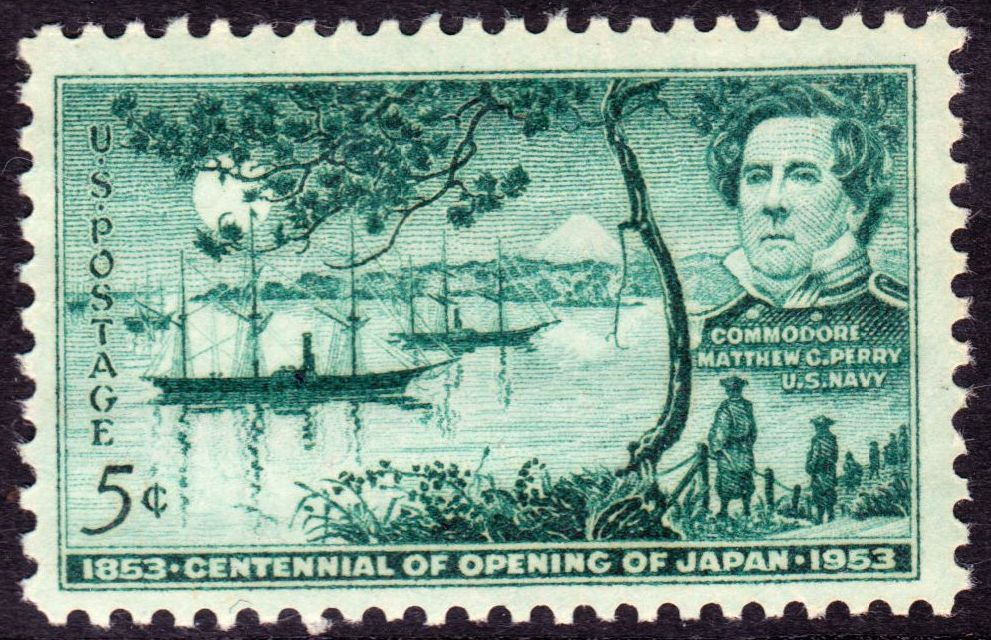
Commodore Matthew C. Perry U.S. postage, 1953 issue

Perry had an ardent interest in and saw the need for naval education, supporting an apprentice system to train new seamen, and helped establish the curriculum for the United States Naval Academy. He was a vocal proponent of modernizing the Navy. Once promoted to captain, he oversaw construction of the Navy's second steam frigate USS Fulton, which he commanded after its completion.

He was called "The Father of the Steam Navy", and he organized America's first corps of naval engineers. Perry conducted the first U.S. naval gunnery school while commanding Fulton from 1839 to 1841 off Sandy Hook on the New Jersey coast.

=== Promotion to commodore ===
In 1841, Perry received the title of commodore, when the Secretary of the Navy appointed him commandant of New York Navy Yard. The United States Navy did not have ranks higher than captain until 1857, so the title of commodore carried considerable importance. Officially, an officer would revert to his permanent rank after the squadron command assignment had ended, although in practice officers who received the title of commodore retained the title for life, as did Perry.

During his tenure in Brooklyn, he lived in Quarters A in Vinegar Hill, a building which still stands today. In 1843, Perry took command of the Africa Squadron, whose duty was to interdict the slave trade under the Webster-Ashburton Treaty, and continued in this endeavor to 1844.

=== Mexican–American War ===
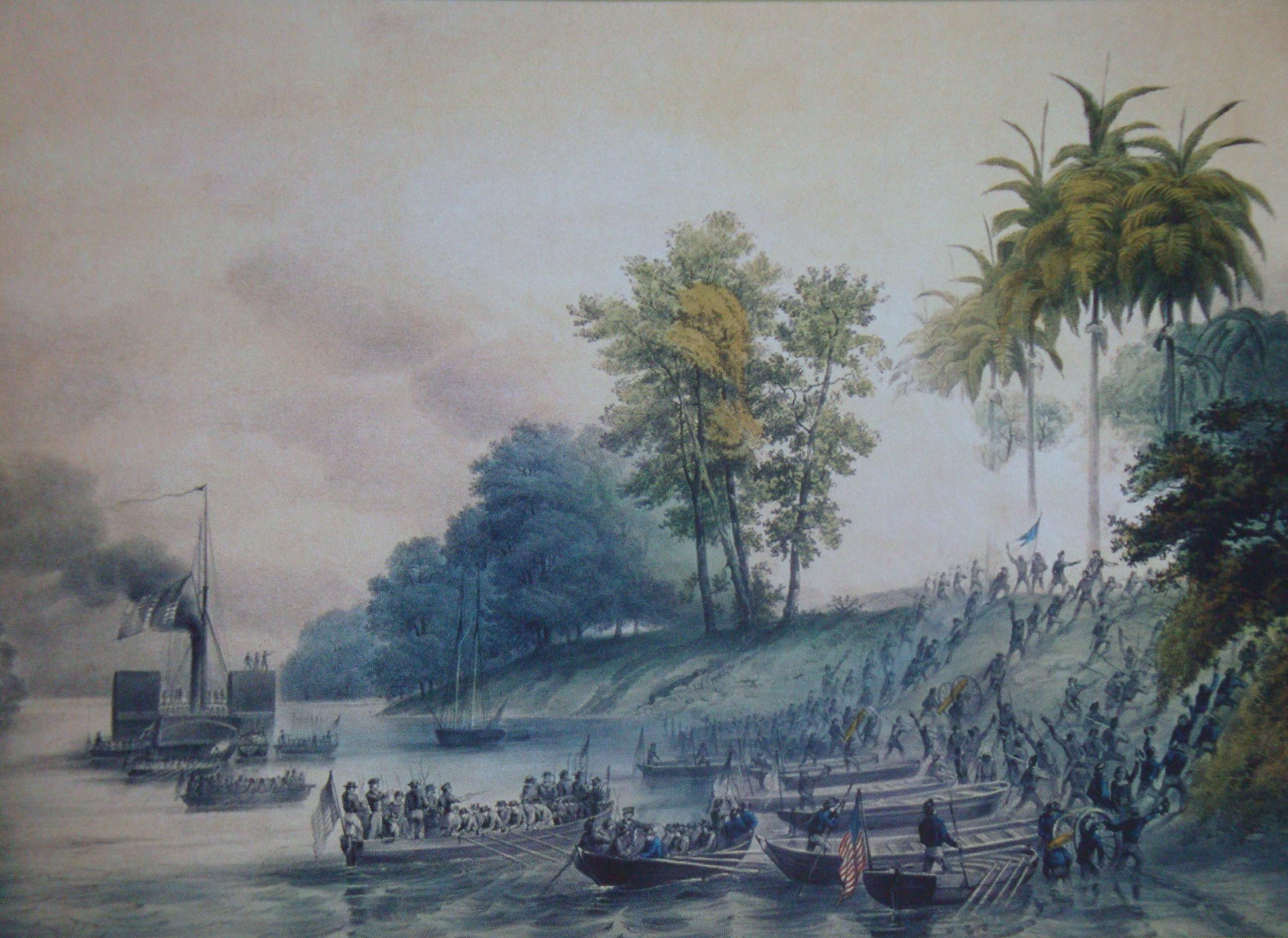
In 1847, Perry attacked and took San Juan Bautista (Villahermosa today) in the Second Battle of Tabasco.

In 1845, Commodore David Conner's length of service in command of the Home Squadron had come to an end. However, the coming of the Mexican–American War persuaded the authorities not to change commanders in the face of the war. Perry, who eventually succeeded Conner, was made second-in-command and captained USS Mississippi. Perry captured the Mexican city of Frontera, demonstrated against Tabasco, being defeated in San Juan Bautista by Colonel Juan Bautista Traconis in the First Battle of Tabasco, and took part in the capture of Tampico on November 14, 1846.

Perry had to return to Norfolk, Virginia, to make repairs and was there when the amphibious landings at Veracruz took place. His return to the U.S. gave his superiors the chance to give him orders to succeed Commodore Conner in command of the Home Squadron. Perry returned to the fleet, and his ship supported the siege of Veracruz from the sea.

After the fall of Veracruz, Winfield Scott moved inland, and Perry moved against the remaining Mexican port cities. Perry assembled the Mosquito Fleet and captured Tuxpan in April 1847. In June 1847 he attacked Tabasco personally, leading a 1,173-man landing force ashore and attacking the city of San Juan Bautista from land, defeating the Mexican forces and taking the city.

In 1847, Perry was elected as an honorary member of the New York Society of the Cincinnati in recognition of his achievements during the Mexican War.

== Perry Expedition: opening of Japan, 1852–1854 ==
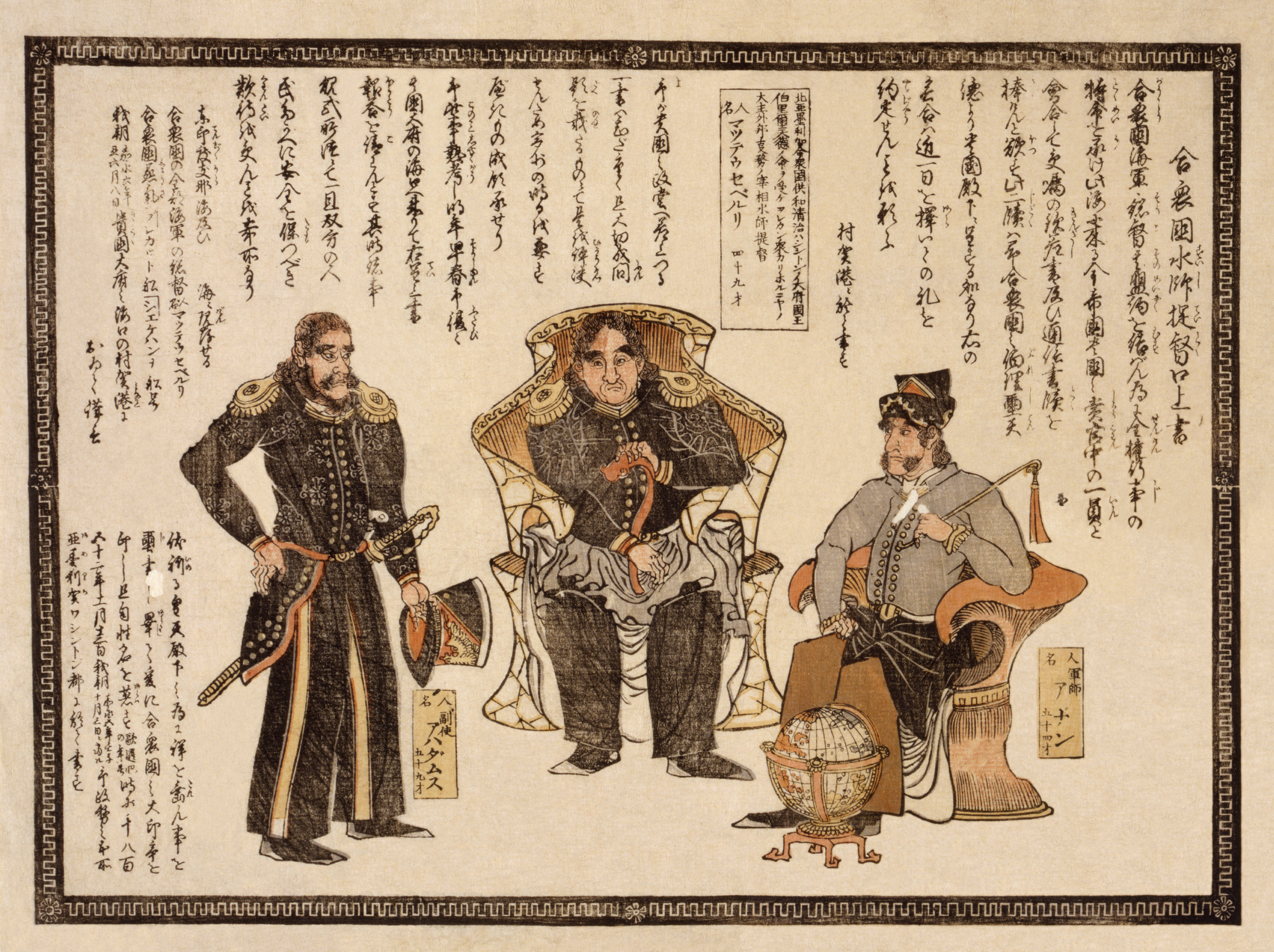
Japanese woodblock print of Perry (center) and two other officers

=== American motivations ===
In 1852, Perry was assigned a mission by American President Millard Fillmore to force the opening of Japanese ports to American trade, through the use of gunboat diplomacy if necessary. The growing commerce between the United States and China, the presence of American whalers in waters offshore Japan, and the increasing monopolization of potential coaling stations by European powers in Asia were all contributing factors. Shipwrecked foreign sailors were either imprisoned or executed, and the safe return of such persons was one demand.

The Americans were also driven by concepts of manifest destiny and the desire to impose the benefits of western civilization and the Christian religion on what they perceived as backward Asian nations. "The people of America will, in some form or other, extend their dominion and their power, until they shall have brought within their mighty embrace the islands of the great Pacific, and placed the Saxon race upon the eastern shores of Asia," Perry said. The Japanese were forewarned by the Dutch of Perry's voyage but were unwilling to change their 250-year-old policy of national seclusion. There was considerable internal debate in Japan on how best to meet this potential threat to Japan's economic and political sovereignty.

=== The journey ===
On November 24, 1852, Perry embarked from Norfolk, Virginia, for Japan, in command of the East India Squadron in pursuit of a Japanese trade treaty. He chose the paddle-wheeled steam frigate Mississippi as his flagship and made port calls at Madeira (December 11–15), Saint Helena (January 10–11), Cape Town (January 24 – February 3), Mauritius (February 18–28), Ceylon (March 10–15), Singapore (March 25–29), Macao and Hong Kong (April 7–28).

In Hong Kong he met with American-born Sinologist Samuel Wells Williams, who provided Chinese language translations of his official letters, and where he rendezvoused with Plymouth. He continued to Shanghai (May 4–17), where he met with the Dutch-born American diplomat, Anton L. C. Portman, who translated his official letters into the Dutch language, and where he rendezvoused with Susquehanna.

Perry then switched his flag to Susquehanna and made call at Naha on Great Lewchew Island (Ryukyu, now Okinawa) from May 17–26. Ignoring the claims of Satsuma Domain to the islands, he demanded an audience with the Ryukyuan King Shō Tai at Shuri Castle and secured promises that the Ryukyu Kingdom would be open to trade with the United States. Continuing on to the Ogasawara islands in mid-June, Perry met with the local inhabitants and purchased a plot of land.

=== First visit (1853) ===
Perry reached Uraga at the entrance to Edo Bay in Japan on July 8, 1853. His actions at this crucial juncture were informed by a careful study of Japan's previous contacts with Western ships and what he knew about the Japanese hierarchical culture. As he arrived, Perry ordered his ships to steam past Japanese lines towards the capital of Edo and turn their guns towards the town of Uraga. Perry refused Japanese demands to leave or to proceed to Nagasaki, the only Japanese port open to foreigners.

Perry attempted to intimidate the Japanese by presenting them a white flag and a letter which told them that in case they chose to fight, the Americans would destroy them. He also fired blank shots from his 73 cannon, which he claimed was in celebration of the American Independence Day. Perry's ships were equipped with new Paixhans shell guns, cannons capable of wreaking great explosive destruction with every shell. He also ordered his ship boats to commence survey operations of the coastline and surrounding waters over the objections of local officials.

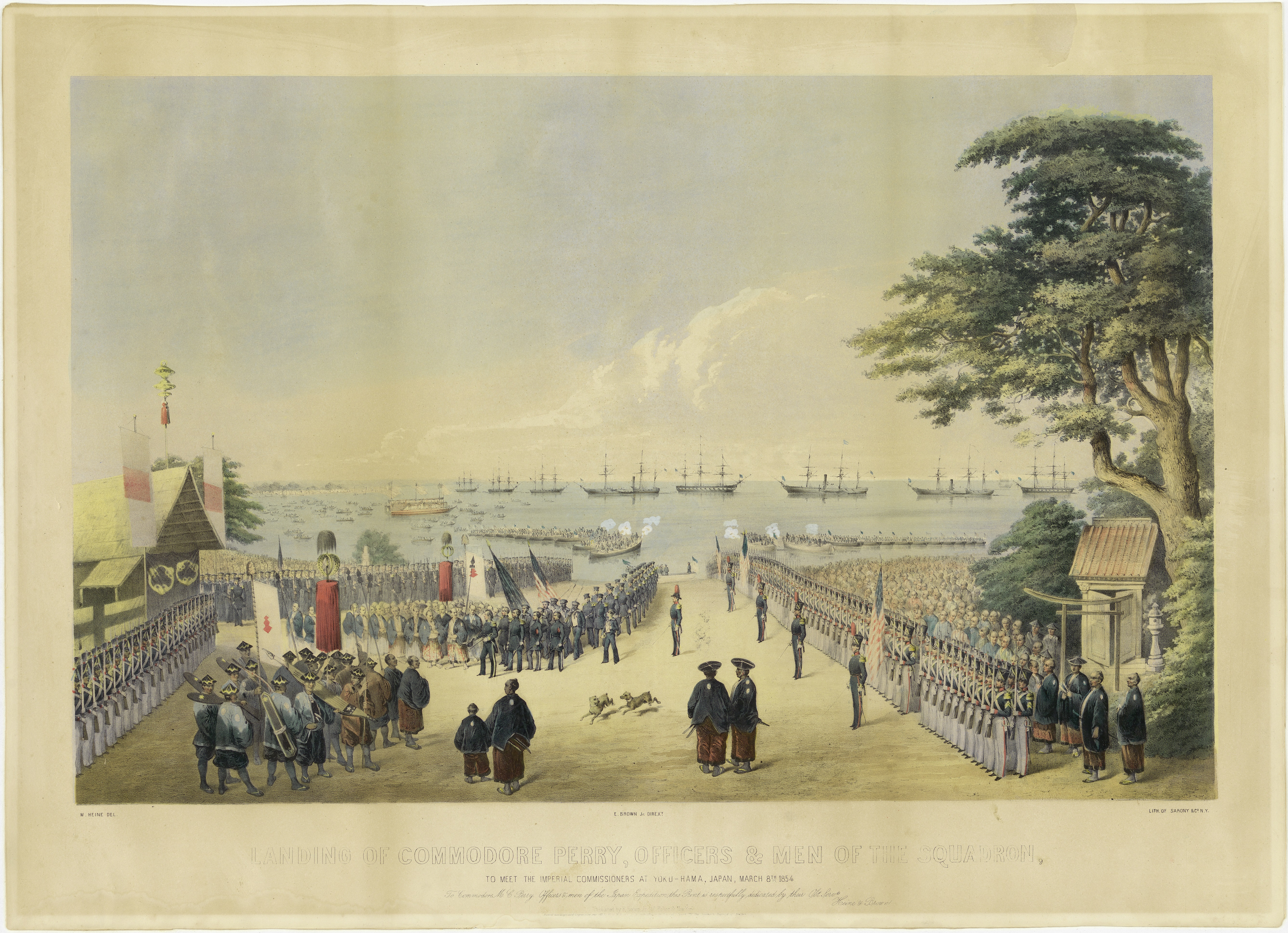
Perry's visit in 1854

Meanwhile, shōgun Tokugawa Ieyoshi was ill and incapacitated, which resulted in governmental indecision on how to handle the unprecedented threat to the nation's capital. On July 11, Rōjū Abe Masahiro bided his time, deciding that simply accepting a letter from the Americans would not constitute a violation of Japanese sovereignty. The decision was conveyed to Uraga, and Perry was asked to move his fleet slightly southwest to the beach at Kurihama where he was allowed to land on July 14, 1853. After presenting the letter to attending delegates, Perry departed for Hong Kong, promising to return the following year for the Japanese reply.

=== Second visit (1854) ===
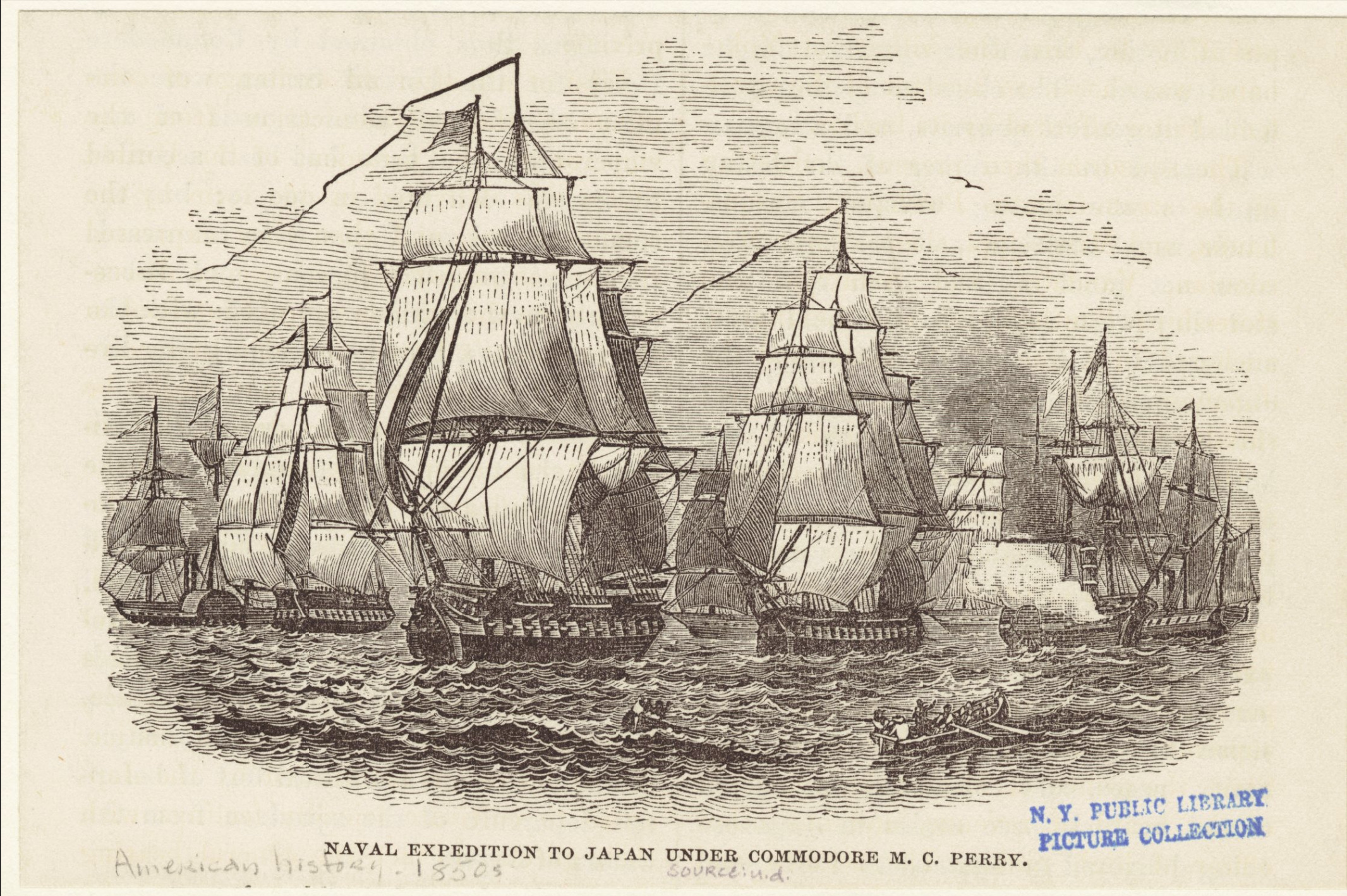
Perry's fleet for his second visit to Japan, 1854

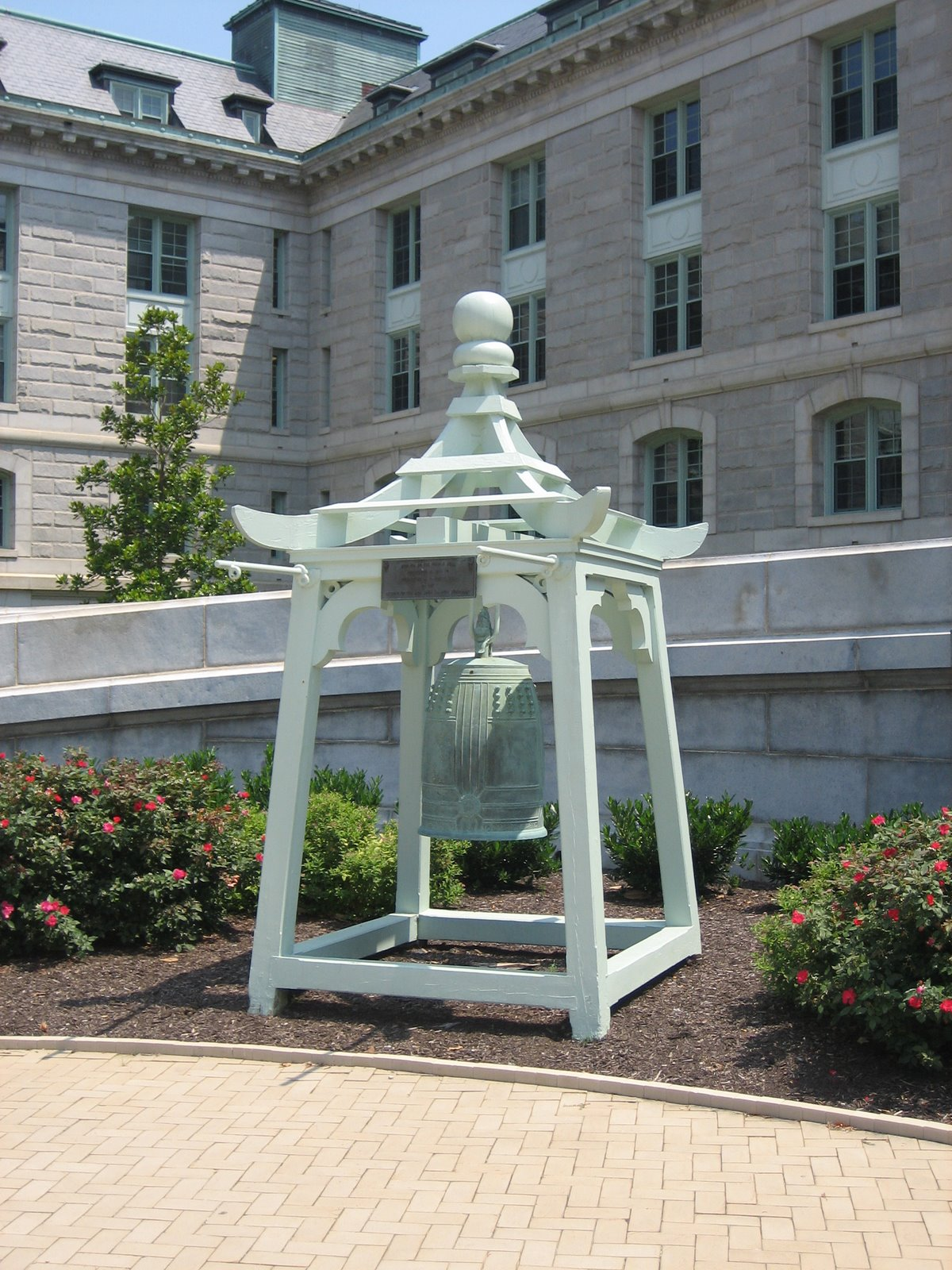
An exact replica of the Gokoku-ji Bell which Perry brought back from Okinawa, saying it was a gift from the Ryukyu Kingdom. Stationed at the entrance of Bancroft Hall at the United States Naval Academy in Annapolis, MD. The original bell was returned to Okinawa in 1987.

On his way back to Japan, Perry anchored off Keelung in Formosa, known today as Taiwan, for ten days. Perry and crewmembers landed on Formosa and investigated the potential of mining the coal deposits in that area. He emphasized in his reports that Formosa provided a convenient, mid-way trade location. Perry's reports noted that the island was very defensible and could serve as a base for exploration in a similar way that Cuba had done for the Spanish in the Americas. Occupying Formosa could help the United States counter European monopolization of the major trade routes. The United States government failed to respond to Perry's proposal to claim sovereignty over Formosa.

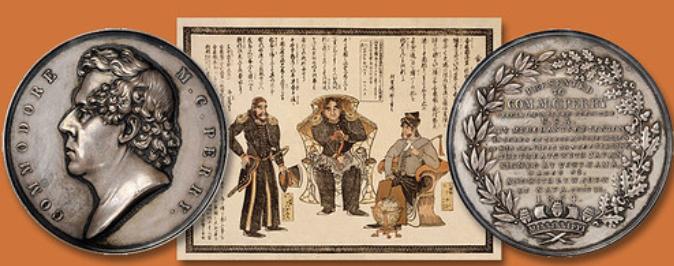
1854 Commodore Perry silver Japan treaty medal

To command his fleet, Perry chose officers with whom he had served in the Mexican–American War. Commander Franklin Buchanan was captain of Susquehanna. Joel Abbot, Perry's second in command, was captain of Macedonian. Commander Henry A. Adams was chief of staff with the title "Captain of the Fleet". Major Jacob Zeilin, future commandant of the United States Marine Corps, was the ranking Marine officer and was stationed on Mississippi.

Perry returned on February 13, 1854, after only half a year rather than the full year promised, and with ten ships and 1,600 men. American leadership designed the show of force to "command fear" and "astound the Orientals." After initial resistance, Perry was permitted to land at Kanagawa, near the site of present-day Yokohama on March 8. The Convention of Kanagawa was signed on March 31. Perry signed as American plenipotentiary, and Hayashi Akira, also known by his title of Daigaku-no-kami, signed for the Japanese side. The celebratory events for the signing ceremony included a Kabuki play from the Japanese side and, from the American side, U.S. military band music and blackface minstrelsy.

Perry departed, mistakenly believing the agreement had been made with imperial representatives, not understanding the true position of the shōgun, the de facto ruler of Japan. Perry then visited Hakodate on the northern island of Hokkaido and Shimoda, the two ports which the treaty stipulated would be opened to visits by American ships. A handscroll with pictorial record from the Japanese side of US Commodore Matthew Perry's second visit to Japan in 1854 is retained in the British Museum in London.

=== Return to the United States (1855) ===
When Perry returned to the United States, Congress voted to grant him a reward of $20,000, equivalent to $550,000 in 2025, in appreciation of his work in Japan. He used part of this money to prepare and publish a report on the expedition in three volumes, titled Narrative of the Expedition of an American Squadron to the China Seas and Japan.

== Last years ==
Living in his adopted home of New York City, Perry's health began to fail as he suffered from cirrhosis of the liver from heavy drinking. Perry was known to have been an alcoholic, which compounded the health complications leading to his death. He also suffered severe arthritis that left him in frequent pain, and on occasion precluded him from his duties.

Perry spent his last years preparing for the publication of his account of the Japan expedition, announcing its completion on December 28, 1857. Two days later he was detached from his last post, an assignment to the Naval Efficiency Board. He died awaiting further orders on March 4, 1858, in New York City, of rheumatic fever that had spread to the heart, compounded by complications of gout and alcoholism.

Initially interred in a vault on the grounds of St. Mark's Church in-the-Bowery, in New York City, Perry's remains were moved to the Island Cemetery in Newport, Rhode Island, on March 21, 1866, along with those of his infant daughter, Anna, who died in 1839. In 1873, an elaborate monument was placed by Perry's widow over his grave in Newport.

== Personal life ==
Perry married Jane Slidell Perry (1797–1864), sister of United States Senator John Slidell, in New York on December 24, 1814, and they had ten children:

- Jane Slidell Perry (c. 1817–1880)
- Sarah Perry (1818–1905), who married Col. Robert Smith Rodgers (1809–1891)
- Jane Hazard Perry (1819–1881), who married Frederic de Peyster (1796–1882) and John Hone (1819–1891). Mary Crane Hone was her grand-daughter.
- Matthew Calbraith Perry (1821–1873), a captain in the United States Navy and veteran of the Mexican War and the Civil War
- Susan Murgatroyde Perry (c. 1824–1825)
- Oliver Hazard Perry (c. 1825–1870), US Consul in Canton, China
- William Frederick Perry (1828–1884), a 2nd Lieutenant, United States Marine Corps, 1847–1848
- Caroline Slidell Perry Belmont (1829–1892), who married financier August Belmont
- Isabella Bolton Perry (1834–1912), who married George T. Tiffany
- Anna Rodgers Perry (c. 1838–1839)

In 1819, Perry joined the masonic Holland Lodge No. 8 in New York City, New York.

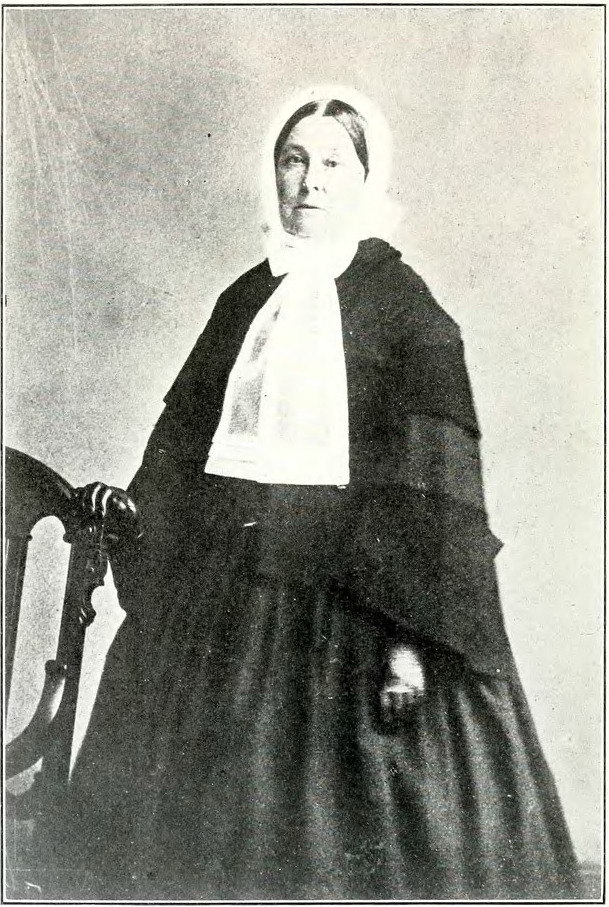
Jane Slidell Perry

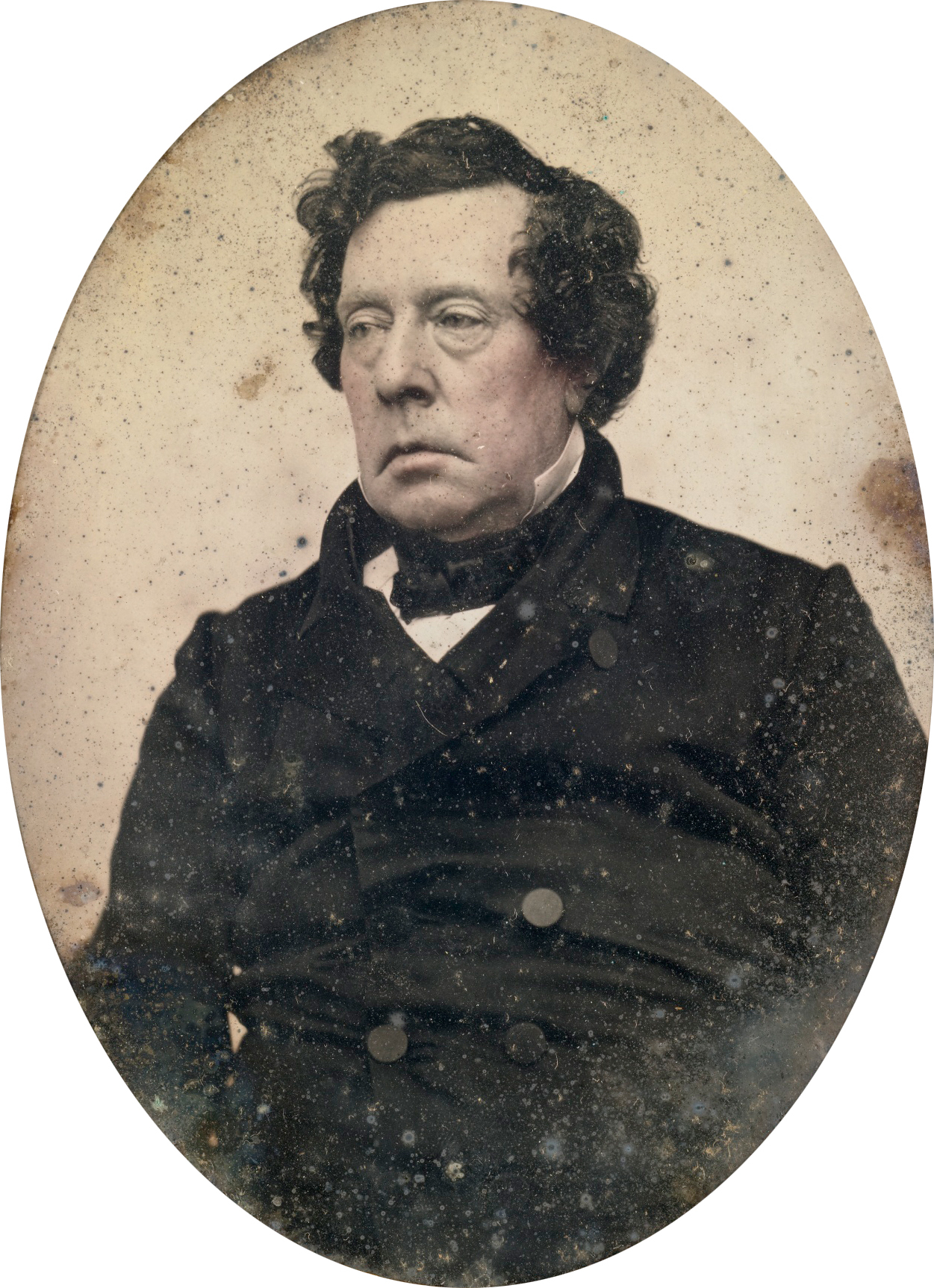
Matthew C. Perry, 1855–56

== Legacy ==
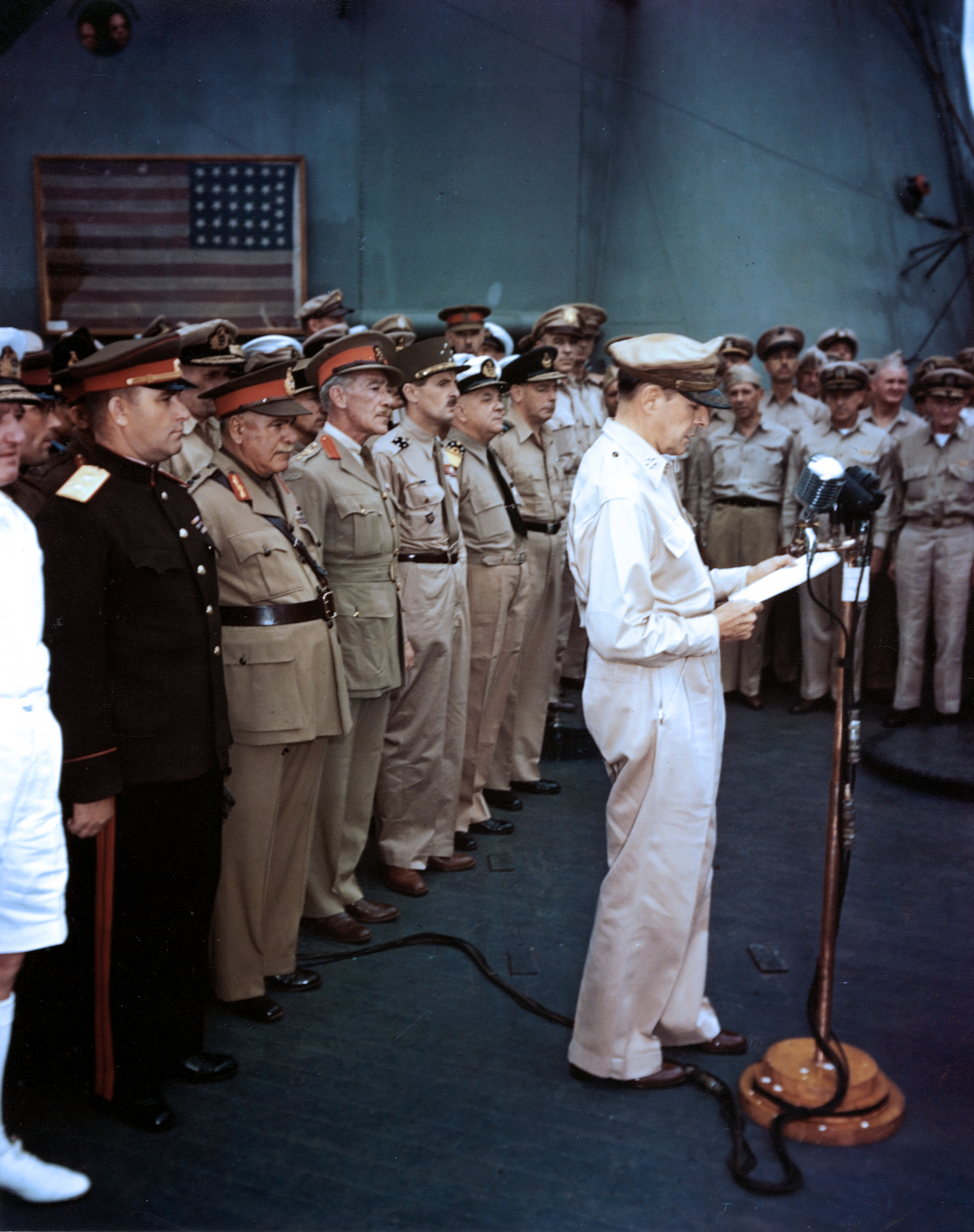
Perry's flag (upper left corner) was flown from Annapolis to Tokyo for display at the surrender ceremonies which officially ended World War II.

Perry was a key agent in both the making and recording of Japanese history, as well as in the shaping of Japanese history. In Japan, over 90% of school children can identify him.

Woodblock paintings of Matthew Perry closely resemble his actual appearance, depicting a physically large, clean shaven, jowly man. The portraits portray him with blue eyeballs, rather than blue irises. Westerners in this period were commonly thought of as "blue-eyed barbarians", however, in Japanese culture, blue eyeballs were also associated with ferocious or threatening figures, such as monsters or renegades. It is thought that the intimidation that the Japanese felt at the time could have influenced these portraits. Some portraits of Perry depict him as a tengu. However, the portraits of his crewmen are normal.

When Perry returned to the United States after signing the Convention of Kanagawa, he brought with him diplomatic gifts, including art, pottery, textiles, musical instruments, and other artifacts now in the collection of the Smithsonian Institution.

Pacific Overtures is a musical set in Japan beginning in 1853 and follows the difficult westernization of Japan, told from the point of view of the Japanese.

A replica of Perry's U.S. flag is on display on board the USS Missouri memorial in Pearl Harbor, Hawaii, attached to the bulkhead just inboard of the Japanese surrender signing site on the starboard side of the ship. The original flag was brought from the U.S. Naval Academy Museum to Japan for the Japan surrender ceremony and was displayed on that occasion at the request of Douglas MacArthur, who was a blood-relative of Perry. Today, the flag is preserved and on display at the Naval Academy Museum in Annapolis, Maryland.

In the museum, the flag is displayed the 'wrong' way round. However, photographs show that at the signing ceremony, this flag was displayed properly, on its starboard side, with the stars in the upper right corner, as are all flags on vessels, known as ensigns. The cloth of this historic flag was so fragile that the conservator at the museum directed that a protective backing be sewn on it, which accounts for its currently being displayed 'port' side round.

In Sid Meier's Civilization VI, players can recruit Perry as a Great Admiral.

== Memorials ==
Japan erected a monument to Perry on July 14, 1901, at the spot where the commodore first landed. The monument survived World War II and is now the centerpiece of a small seaside park called Perry Park at Yokosuka, Japan. Within the park there is a small museum dedicated to the events of 1854. Matthew C. Perry Elementary and High School can be found on Marine Corps Air Station, Iwakuni.

At his birthplace in Newport, there is a memorial plaque in Trinity Church, Newport and a statue of Perry in Touro Park. It was designed by John Quincy Adams Ward, erected in 1869, and dedicated by his daughter. He was buried in Newport's Island Cemetery, near his parents and brother. There are also exhibits and research collections concerning his life at the Naval War College Museum and at the Newport Historical Society.

Perry Street in Trenton, New Jersey is named in his honor.

The U.S. Navy's Oliver Hazard Perry-class frigates (purchased in the 1970s and 1980s) were named after Perry's brother, Commodore Oliver Hazard Perry. The ninth ship of the Lewis and Clark class of dry-cargo-ammunition vessels is named USNS Matthew Perry.

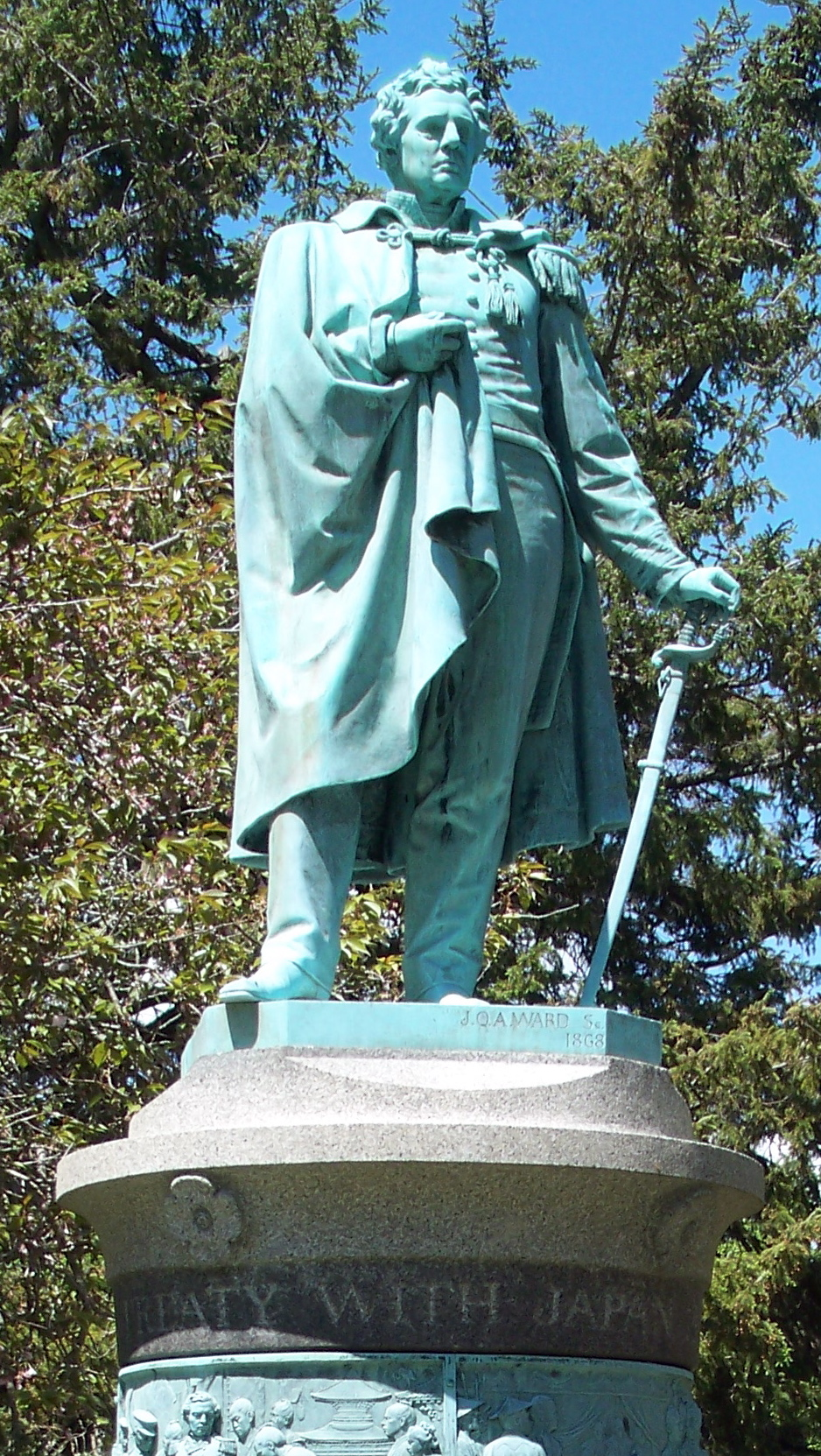
Perry's statue in Touro Park, Newport, Rhode Island

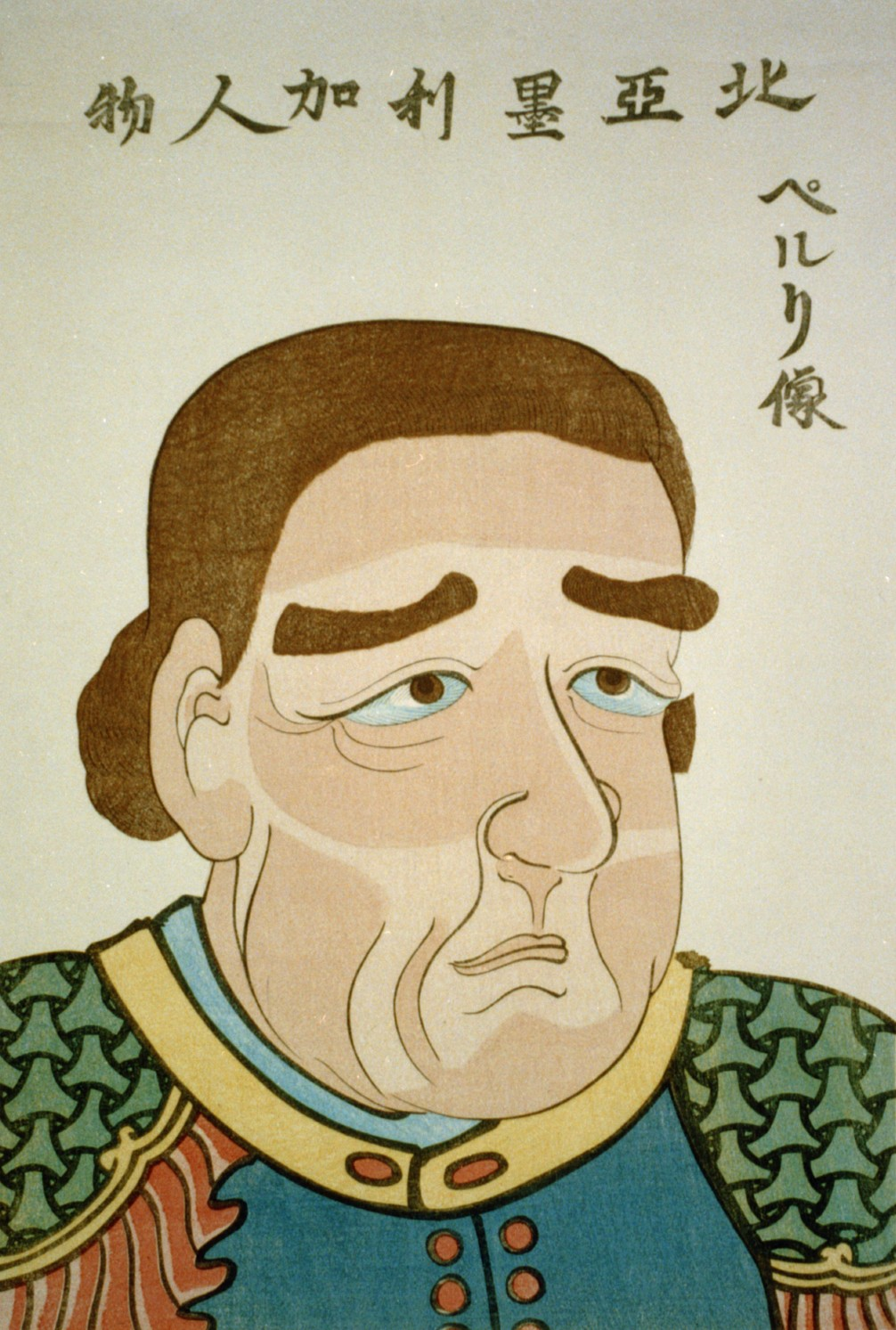
Japanese woodblock print of Perry, c. 1854. The caption reads "North American" (top line, written from right to left in Kanji) and "Perry's portrait" (first line, written from top to bottom).

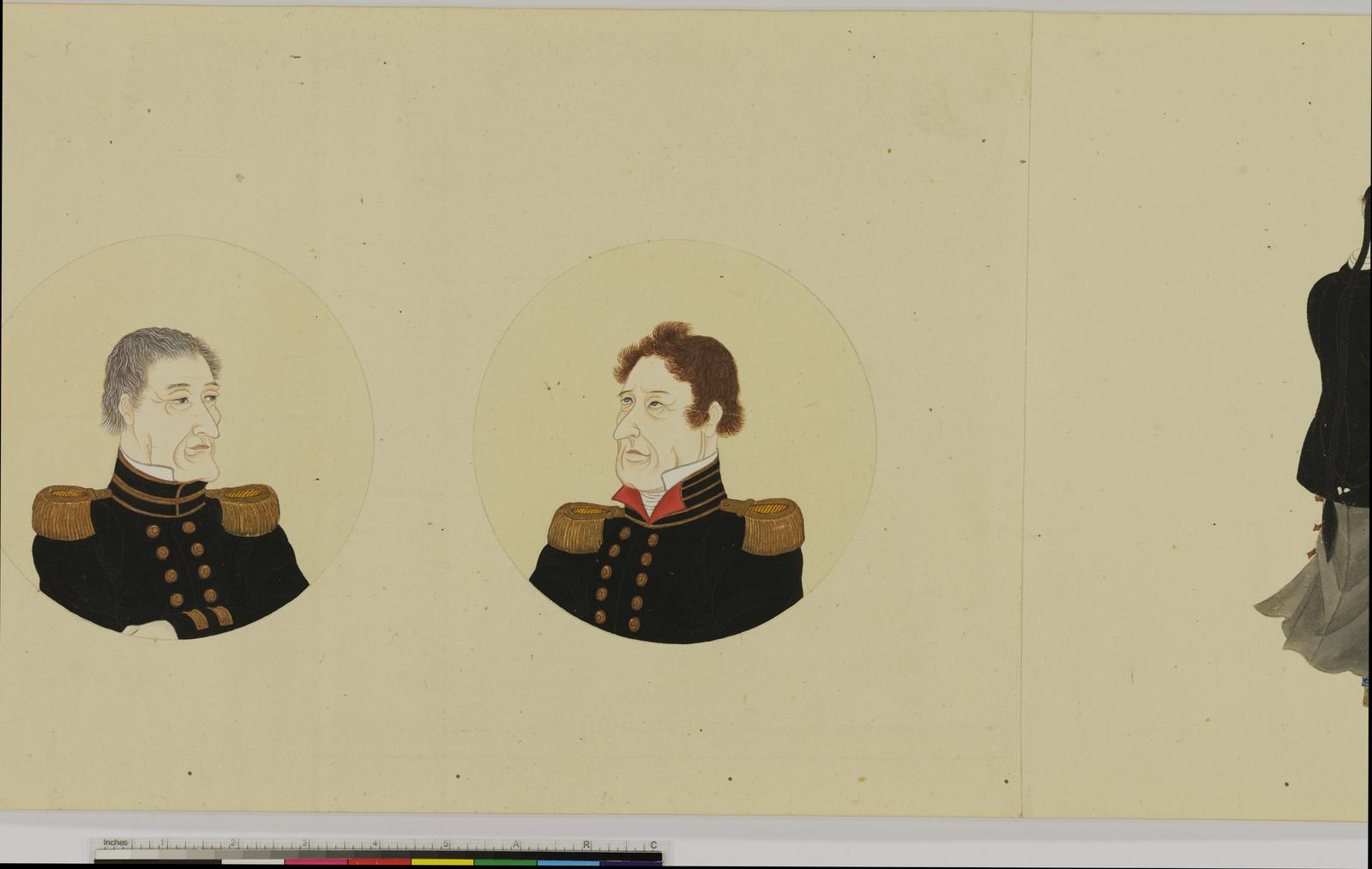
A pictorial representation of Perry (on the right) from the scroll painted by the Japanese artist Hibata Ōsuke to mark the occasion of the signing of the Convention of Kanagawa in 1854. The 15.25m long scroll has been part of the British Museum's collection since 2013.

== See also ==
- Bibliography of early American naval history
- History of Japan
- Meiji Restoration
- Sakoku
- Yokohama Archives of History
- List of Westerners who visited Japan before 1868

== Citations ==
Military offices
Preceded by John H. Aulick	Commander, East India Squadron; 1852–1854	Succeeded by Joel Abbot
