= List of United States military and volunteer units in the Mexican–American War =

This is a list of United States military units that participated in the Mexican–American War. The list includes regular U.S. Army, Navy, Marine Corps, and Revenue Marine Service units and ships as well as the units of the militia that various states recruited for the war. The commanding officer of each unit or ship is identified when there are references with content that aids identification. Dates are included when they are available in the references.

== Regular U.S. Army regiments serving in Mexico from 1846 to 1848 ==
=== Regiments of dragoons ===
- 1st Regiment of Dragoons, Colonel Richard B. Mason
- 2nd Regiment of Dragoons, Colonel William S. Harney (Note: One of ten new regiments raised for one year according to act of Congress 11 February 1847.)
- 3rd Regiment of Dragoons, Colonel Edward G. W. Butler, (appointed from Louisiana)

=== Mounted riflemen ===
- Regiment of Mounted Riflemen, Colonel Persifor F. Smith

=== Regiments of artillery ===
- 1st Regiment of Artillery, Lt. Colonel Benjamin K. Pierce
- 2nd Regiment of Artillery, Colonel James Monroe Bankhead
- 3rd Regiment of Artillery, Colonel William Gates
- 4th Regiment of Artillery, Lt. Colonel Matthew M. Payne

=== Regiments of infantry ===
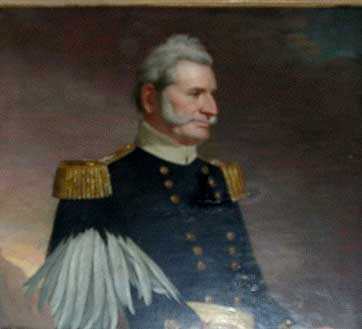
Lieutenant Colonel Bennet C. Riley

- 1st Regiment of Infantry, Colonel William Davenport
- 2nd Regiment of Infantry, Lt. Colonel Bennet Riley
- 3rd Regiment of Infantry, Lt. Colonel Ethan A. Hitchcock
- 4th Regiment of Infantry, Lt. Colonel John Garland
- 5th Regiment of Infantry, Lt. Colonel James S. Mcintosh
- 6th Regiment of Infantry, Colonels: Zachary Taylor; Newman S. Clarke
- 7th Regiment of Infantry, Lt. Colonel Joseph Plympton
- 8th Regiment of Infantry, Colonel William J. Worth

=== Regiments of infantry, 1847 ===
These units were raised according to an act of Congress, 11 February 1847 for an enlistment period of one year. (Note: Nine of ten new regiments raised for one year according to act of Congress 11 February 1847.)

- 9th Regiment of Infantry, Colonel Truman B. Ransom, (appointed from Vermont)
- 10th Regiment of Infantry, Colonel Robert E. Temple, (appointed from New York)
- 11th Regiment of Infantry, Colonel Albert C. Ramsey, (appointed from Pennsylvania)
- 12th Regiment of Infantry, Colonel Milledge L. Bonham, (appointed from South Carolina)
- 13th Regiment of Infantry, Colonel Robert M. Echols, (appointed from Georgia)
- 14th Regiment of Infantry, Colonel William Trousdale, (appointed from Tennessee)
- 15th Regiment of Infantry, Colonel George W. Morgan, (appointed from Ohio)
- 16th Regiment of Infantry, Colonel John W. Tibbatts, (appointed from Kentucky)
- Regiment of Voltigeurs and Foot Riflemen, Colonel Timothy P. Andrews, (appointed from District of Columbia)

== Volunteer units serving in Mexico from 1846 to 1848 ==
=== Alabama ===
- Battalion of Alabama Volunteers, for 3 months (4 companies); May–August 1846. Lt. Colonel Phillip H. Raiford
- Battalion of Alabama Volunteers, for the duration of the war with Mexico (5 companies); November and December 1847 – June 1848. Major John I. Seibels
- 3 Independent Companies of Alabama Volunteers, for 6 months; received for 3 months, May–August 1846:
  - 1st Independent Company of Alabama Volunteers, for 6 months; Captain Robert Desha
  - 2nd Independent Company of Alabama Volunteers, for 6 months; Captain William H. Platt
  - 3rd Independent Company of Alabama Volunteers, for 6 months; Captain Rush Elmore
- Independent Company of Alabama Mounted Volunteers, for the duration; June 1847 – July 1848. Captain James McGee

=== Arkansas ===
- Regiment of Arkansas Mounted Volunteers, for 12 months; June 1846 – June 1847. Colonels: Archibald Yell (killed at Buena Vista); John S. Roane (Lt. Colonel to 28 February 1847)
- Independent Companies of Arkansas Mounted Volunteers in the Mexican War:
  - 1st Independent Company, Arkansas Mounted Volunteers; 27 May 1847 – 24 June 1848. Captain Gaston Meares (late Lt. Colonel Arkansas Volunteer Regiment)
  - 2nd Independent Company, Arkansas Mounted Volunteers; 15 June 1847 – June 1848. Captain Stephen B. Enyart; Served in New Mexico, and on the Rio Grande

=== California ===
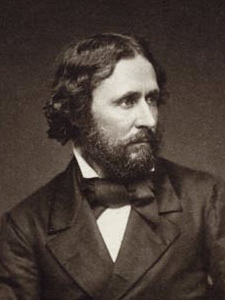
John C. Frémont

- Battalions of California Volunteers, for 3 and for 6 months; recruited in July and October 1846 – April 1847. Lt. Colonel Commanding John C. Fremont (Bvt. Captain Topographic Engineers and Major of Volunteers, 23 July and 26 October 1846 – 19 April 1847)
  - Mounted Rifle Company A. Captain Richard Owens
  - Mounted Rifle Company B. Captain Henry S. Ford
  - Mounted Rifle Company C. Captain Granville P. Swift
  - Mounted Rifle Company D. Captain John Sears
  - Mounted Rifle Company E. Captain John Grigsby
  - Mounted Rifle Company F. Captain Lansford W. Hastings
  - Mounted Rifle Company G. Captain B. K. Thompson
  - Mounted Rifle Company H. Captain Richard T. Jacobs (Spy Company chiefly of native Indians)
  - Artillery Company A. Captain John K. Wilson (Midshipman U.S. Navy)
  - Artillery Company. Captain William Findlay
  - Mounted Rifle Company. Captain Samuel Gibson (wounded at San Pasqual)
  - Company of Native Californians. Captain Santiago E. Arguello

=== Florida ===
- 1st Independent Company of Florida Volunteers, for 12 months; February 1847 – March 1848. Captain William W. J. Kelly; Served at Guadaloupe and Santa Fe, Mexico
- 2nd Independent Company of Florida Volunteers, for the duration; August 1847 – July 1848. Captains: K. G. Livingston, (died 9 February 1848 at Guadaloupe, Mexico); George Holmes (2nd Lieutenant to March 1848)

=== Georgia ===
- Regiment of Georgia Volunteers, for 12 months; June 1846 – May 1847. Colonel Henry R. Jackson
- Battalion of Georgia Volunteers, for the duration, (5 companies); July 1847 – July 1848. Lt. Colonel Isaac G. Seymour
- Battalion of Georgia Mounted Volunteers, for the duration, (6 companies); September 1847 – July 1848. Lt. Colonel James S. Calhoun (late Capt. in Jackson's Regt.)
- Independent Company of Georgia Mounted Men; May 1847 – August 1848. Captain John Loyall

=== Illinois ===
- 1st Regiment of Illinois Volunteers, for 12 months; June 1846 – June 1847. Colonels: John J. Hardin (Killed at BuenaVista); William Weatherford (Lt. Colonel to 26 February 1847)
- 2nd Regiment of Illinois Volunteers, for 12 months; June 1846 – June 1847. Colonel William H. Bissell
- 3rd Regiment of Illinois Volunteers, for 12 months; July 1846 – May 1847. Colonel Ferris Foreman
- 4th Regiment of Illinois Volunteers, for 12 months; July 1846 – May 1847. Colonel Edward D. Baker
- 1st Regiment of Illinois Volunteers, for the duration; June 1847 – October 1848. Colonel Edward W. B. Newby
- 2nd Regiment of Illinois Volunteers, for the duration; August 1847 – July 1848. Colonel James Collins
- Independent Companies of Illinois Mounted Volunteers:
  - 1st Company Illinois Mounted Volunteers; 21 May 1847 – 7 November 1848. Captain Adams Dunlap (served with Brigadier General Wool)
  - 2nd Company Illinois Mounted Volunteers; August 1847 – 26 July 1848. Captain Wyatt B. Stapp
  - 3rd Company Illinois Mounted Volunteers; 13 August 1847 – 26 October 1848. Captain Michael K. Lawler (served with Brigadier General Wool)
  - 4th Company Illinois Mounted Volunteers; 13 September 1847 – 25 July 1848. Captain Josiah Littell

=== Indiana ===
- 1st Regiment of Indiana Volunteers, for 12 months; June 1846 – June 1847. Colonel James P. Drake
- 2nd Regiment of Indiana Volunteers, for 12 months; June 1846 – June 1847. Colonels: Joseph Lane (appointed Brigadier General U.S. Volunteers, 1 July 1846); William A. Bowles
- 3rd Regiment of Indiana Volunteers, for 12 months; June 1846 – June 1847. Colonel James H. Lane
- 4th Regiment of Indiana Volunteers, for the duration; June 1847 – July 1848. Colonel Willis A. Gorman (late Major of J. H. Lane's Regt.)
- 5th Regiment of Indiana Volunteers, for the duration; October 1847 – July 1848. Colonel James H. Lane (late Colonel 3rd Regiment Indiana 12 months Volunteers)

=== Iowa ===
- Battalion of Iowa "Mormon" Volunteers, for 12 months, (5 companies); recruited and mustered at Council Bluffs, Indian Territory on 16 July 1846 and discharged 16 July 1847 at Los Angeles; Lt. Colonels: James Allen (Captain 1st U.S. Dragoons, died at Fort Leavenworth 23 August 1846); acting commander Jefferson Hunt (senior Captain, Co A, Mormon Battalion, from 23 to 29 August 1846); Andrew Jackson Smith (1st Lieutenant 1st Dragoons, acting 30 August 1846 to 12 October 1846); Philip St. George Cooke (Captain 1st Dragoons, 13 October 1846 – 13 May 1847 when he relinquished command of the battalion to accompany Gen. Stephen W. Kearny back to Ft. Leavenworth); acting commander Jefferson Hunt (senior Captain, Co A, Mormon Battalion, from 13 May to 16 July 1847).

The Mormon Battalion was recruited as a federal volunteer unit, not through the state of Iowa which was not created until December 1846. The Mormon Battalion was raised at the express invitation of President James K. Polk, not as part of any state or territorial requisition for troops.

The contemporary official Army documents refer to the unit in the following ways; Prior to Allen recruiting the unit as, "Capt. Allen's Battalion of Volunteers". As the new unit was being recruited and mustered into service, its first commander, James Allen, signed official documents with the name he gave the unit, "Mormon Battalion", General Stephen Watts Kearny, in letters of reply to the unit used Allen's naming convention, calling it the "Battalion of Mormons" and "Mormon Battalion" P. St. George Cooke, commanding the battalion under orders from Gen Kearny used the name, "Mormon Battalion" when reporting troop strengths in California. (Note: The "of Iowa" confusion appears to have been created because the blank Compiled Military Service Record (CMSR) cards were incorrectly printed in the 1890s. The CMSR cards were originally printed showing, "Mormon Batt'n./Iowa". The auditors and record transcribers attempted to correct the omission of "Volunteers" by stamping "Vols." and crossing through "Iowa" since the unit was not raised by Iowa. Some modern authors, not recognized the importance of the corrections, have ignored the attempted changes and incorrectly perpetuated the "of Iowa" error. Unfortunately, the pension records were also printed with "of Iowa" but not corrected, thus adding to the confusion. However, the contemporary 1846–1847 official Army documents do not refer to Iowa.)

=== Kentucky ===
- Regiment of Kentucky Cavalry Volunteers, for 12 months; June 1846 – July 1847. Colonel Humphrey Marshall (former 2nd Lt 1. U.S. Dragoons.)
- 1st Regiment of Kentucky Volunteers, for 12 months, "Louisville Legion"; May 1846 – May 1847. Colonel Stephen Ormsby
- 2nd Regiment of Kentucky Volunteers, for 12 months; June 1846 – June 1847. Colonels: William R. McKee (former 1st Lt. 3rd. U.S. Artillery, killed.); Lt. Colonel Henry Clay, Jr. (former 2nd Lt. 2nd. U.S. Artillery, killed); Major Gary H. Fry (former 2nd Lt, 3rd. U.S. Infantry)
- 3rd Regiment of Kentucky Volunteers, for the duration; October 1847 – July 1848. Colonel Manlius V. Thomson
- 4th Regiment Kentucky Volunteers, for the duration; October 1847 – July 1848. Colonel John S. Williams (late Capt. of Independent Company)
- Independent Company of Kentucky Volunteers; May 1846 – May 1847. Captain John S. Williams (served with the 6th U.S. Infantry)

=== Louisiana ===
- Louisiana Battalion of Volunteer Artillery, for 3 months; (2 companies); 21 August – November 1845. Major Louis Gaily
- 2nd Battalion of Louisiana Volunteer Artillery, for 6 months, (3 companies), received for 3 months, May–July 1846. Major Louis Gaily (commander 1st Battery)
- Brigade of Louisiana Volunteers, for 6 months, (6 regiments); received, for 3 months. May and June–August 1846. Brigadier General Persifor F. Smith
  - 1st Regiment, P. F. Smith's brigade of Louisiana Volunteers. Colonel James B. Walton
  - 2d Regiment, P. F. Smith's brigade of Louisiana Volunteers. Colonel James H. Dakin
  - 3rd Regiment, P. F. Smith's brigade of Louisiana Volunteers. Colonel Samuel F. Marks
  - 4th Regiment, P. F. Smith's brigade of Louisiana Volunteers. Colonel Horatio Davis
  - 5th Regiment, P. F. Smith's brigade of Louisiana Volunteers. Colonel Baillie Peyton
- Independent Company of Louisiana Volunteers, for 12 months; July 1846 – May 1847. Captain Albert G. Blanchard (former 1st Lieutenant in 3rd U.S. Infantry, and Captain 3rd Louisiana Volunteers)
- Regiment of Louisiana Volunteers, for the duration; December 1846 – July 1848. Colonel Louis G. De Russy (formerly Capt. U.S. Artillery and Paymaster)
- Battalion of Louisiana Volunteers, for the duration, (5 companies); May 1847 – July 1848. Lt. Colonel Charles Fiesca (late Major 4th Regiment Louisiana Volunteers)
- Battalion of Louisiana Mounted Volunteers, for 12 months, (5 companies); July and August 1847 – July 1848. Lt. Colonel Walter F. Biscoe (late 2nd Lieutenant in 2nd Regiment Louisiana Volunteers)

=== Maryland and the District of Columbia ===
- Battalion of Maryland and District of Columbia Volunteers, for 12 months, (6 companies); May 1846 – May 1847. Commanders: Lt. Colonel William H. Watson (killed at Monterey); Brevet Major Robert C. Buchanan (Captain 4th U.S. Infantry Regiment, from November 1846)
- Regiment of Maryland and District of Columbia Volunteers, for the duration, (8 companies); May and June 1847 – 24 July 1848. Colonel George W. Hughes (Captain and brevet Lt. Colonel Topographic Engineers)
- 3 additional Separate Companies were attached to this Regiment:
  - Tennessee Company of Mounted Volunteers; May 1847 to July 1848. Captain C. Roberdeau Wheat (served with 2nd Dragoons; Major General Scott's bodyguard)
  - Pittsburg Company; October 1847 to July 1848. Captain Thomas A. Rowley
  - Independent Company; 8 June 1847 – 1 August 1848. Captains: James Boyd, (Captain in Watson's Battery; killed at Rio Calaboso, 12 July 1847); Joseph R. West, (served at Tampico under Colonel De Russy)

=== Maine ===
- 1st Regiment, General James Thomas
  - 1st Regiment, Bodfish Company (Company D), Captain Charles N. Bodfish
  - 1st Regiment, Simmons Company, Charles Simmons
  - 1st Regiment, Cummings Company, Captain George W. Cummings
  - 1st Regiment, Wardell Company, Ira Wardwell
  - 1st Regiment, Pike Company, Captain Jabez T. Pike
  - 1st Regiment, Nutting Company, Jesse Nutting
  - 1st Regiment, Morrill Company, Captain John H. Morrill
  - 1st Regiment, McCluskey Company (Company B), Captain John McCluskey
  - 1st Regiment, Thomas and Tripp Company, General James Thomas and Samuel Tripp
  - 1st Regiment, Goodwin Company (Company C), Captain Moses Goodwin Jr.
  - 1st Regiment, Young Company, Moses H. Young
  - 1st Regiment, Smith Company (Company G), Wendell L. Smith

=== Massachusetts ===
- Regiment of Massachusetts Volunteers, for the duration of the Mexican War, January and February, 1847 – July 1848. Colonels: Caleb Cushing, (15 January 1847: promoted to Brig. General); Isaac H. Wright (Lt Colonel to 27 May 1847). (Note: This was the only full regiment of volunteers raised in New England during the Mexican War. The 9th Infantry Regiment of the Regular Army, however, was raised primarily in New England.)

=== Michigan ===
- Regiment of Michigan Volunteers, for the duration; December 1847 – July 1848. Colonel Thomas B.W. Stockton (former 1st Lieutenant, 1st. U.S. Infantry)
- Independent Company of Michigan Volunteers, for the duration, 18 June 1847 – 30 June 1848. Captain Morgan L. Gage

=== Mississippi ===
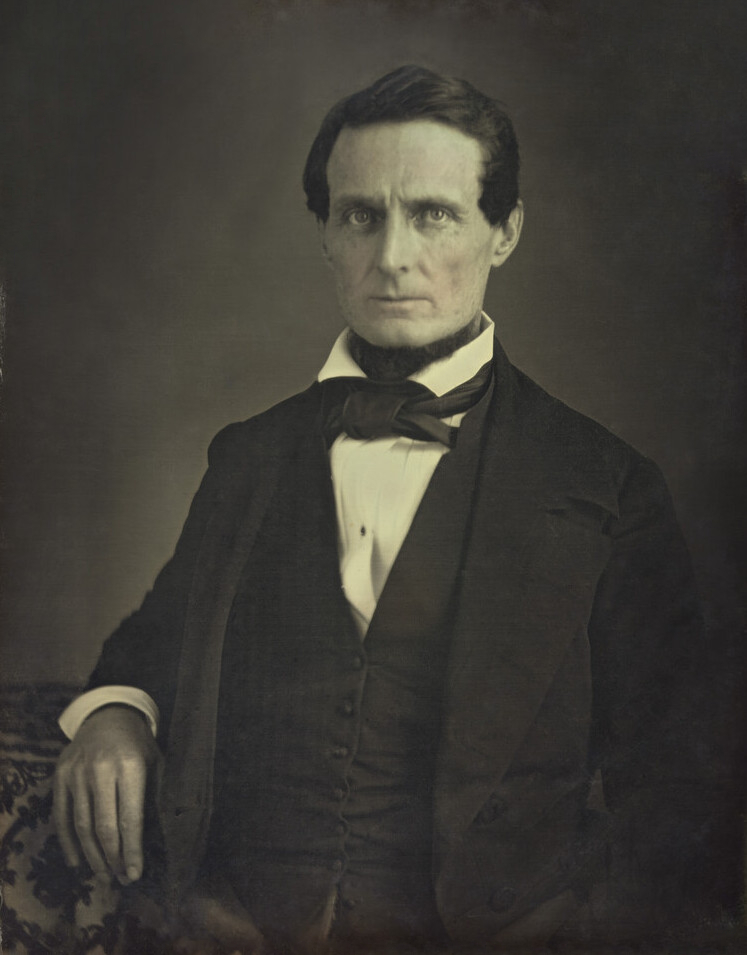
Jefferson Davis, c. 1847

- 1st Regiment of Mississippi Rifles, volunteers for 12 months; June 1846 – June 1847. Colonel Jefferson Davis (former 1st Lieutenant and Adjutant 1st. Dragoons; severe wound, at Buena Vista)
- 2nd Regiment of Mississippi Volunteers, for the duration; received January 1847 – July 1848. Colonels: Reuben Davis (resigned October 1847); Charles Clark (Captain to 16 October 1847)
- 1st Battalion of Mississippi Rifle Volunteers, for the duration, (5 companies); October and November 1847 – June 1848. Lt. Colonel James Patton Anderson

=== Missouri ===
- 1st Regiment of Missouri Mounted Volunteers, for 12 months; (8 companies); June 1846 – June 1847. Colonel Alexander W. Doniphan
- Battalion of Missouri Volunteers, for 12 months; (3 Light Artillery companies; 2 Infantry companies); June and July 1846 – June and July 1847. Major Meriwether L. Clark (former 2nd Lieutenant 6th U.S. Infantry and Aide de Camp to General Scott)
- Battalion of Missouri Mounted Volunteers, for 12 months,(4 companies, first mustered in Price's regiment); August 1846 – August 1847. Lt. Colonel David Willock
- 9 Companies of Missouri Volunteers, for 12 months; received at Fort Leavenworth August and September 1846, order of service countermanded by War Department, September 1846
- Battalion of Missouri Volunteers for during the war with Mexico, (5 companies); May 1847 – October 1848. Lt. Colonel Alton R. Easton (late Colonel "St. Louis Legion.")
- 3rd Regiment of Missouri Mounted Volunteers, for the duration; July 1847 – October 1848. Colonel John Ralls
- Battalion of Missouri Mounted Volunteers, for the duration, (5 companies); August 1847 – November 1848. Lt. Colonel Ludwell E. Powell
- Battalion of Missouri Mounted Volunteers, for the duration, (5 companies); September 1847 – October 1848. Lt. Colonel William Gilpin (late Major of Doniphan's Regt.)

=== New Jersey ===
- Battalion of New Jersey Volunteers, for the duration, (4 companies); September 1847 – July 1848. Lt. Colonel Dickinson Woodruff

=== New York ===
- 1st Regiment of New York Volunteers, for service in California and the duration of the war with Mexico; (originally designated 7th Regiment of New York Volunteers) August–October 1848. Colonel Jonathan D. Stevenson
- 2nd Regiment of New York Volunteers, for the duration; (originally designated 1st Regiment of New York Volunteers) November 1846 – August 1848. Colonel Ward B. Burnett (former 2nd Lt. 2nd U.S. Artillery, severely wounded at Churubusco)

=== North Carolina ===
- Regiment of North Carolina Volunteers, for the duration; January 1847 – August 1848. Colonel Robert T. Paine

=== Ohio ===
- 1st Regiment of Ohio Volunteers, for 12 months; June 1846 – June 1847. Colonel Alexander M. Mitchell (former 2nd Lieutenant, 4th U.S. Infantry, wounded at Monterey)
- 2nd Regiment of Ohio Volunteers, for 12 months; June and July 1846 – June 1847. Colonel George W. Morgan
- 3rd Regiment of Ohio Volunteers, for 12 months; June 1846 – June 1847. Colonel Samuel R. Curtis (former 2nd Lieutenant, 7th U.S. Infantry and Adj. General of Ohio)
- 4th Regiment of Ohio Volunteers, 1st Regiment for the duration; May and June 1847 – July 1848. Colonel Charles H. Brough
- 5th Regiment of Ohio Volunteers, 2nd Regiment for the duration; 1 September 1847 – July 1848. Colonel William Irvin (late Lt. Colonel of Morgan's Regt.)
- Independent Companies of Ohio Volunteers, for the duration:
  - 1st Company of Mounted Men; 1 June 1847 – 2 August 1848. Captain John R. Duncan
  - 2nd Company of Foot; October 1847 – July 1848, (served with Irvin's Regt.). Captains: William Keimeally (died, reported suicide, at Rio Frio, 21 December 1847). William H. Lytle
  - 3rd Company of Foot; 26 October 1847 – 17 July 1848. Captain Robert F. Riddle

=== Pennsylvania ===
- 1st Regiment of Pennsylvania Volunteers, for the duration; December 1846 – July and August 1848. Colonel Francis M. Wynkoop
- 2nd Regiment of Pennsylvania Volunteers, for the duration, (12 companies); January 1847 – July 1848. Colonels: William B. Roberts (died in City of Mexico 3 October 1847); John W. Geary (Lt. Colonel to 3 November 1847, wounded at Chapultepec.)

=== South Carolina ===
- Regiment of South Carolina Volunteers, for the duration, "Palmetto Regiment"; December 1846 – June and July 1848. Colonel Pierce M. Butler (twice wounded, and killed at Churubusco)

=== Tennessee ===
- Regiment of Tennessee Mounted Volunteers, for 12 months; June 1846 – May 1847. Colonel Jonas E. Thomas
- 1st Regiment of Tennessee Volunteers, for 12 months, (12 companies); May and June 1846 – May 1847. Colonel William B. Campbell (former Capt. in Trousdale's Regt. in Florida War)
- 2nd Regiment of Tennessee Volunteers, for 12 months, (8 companies); June 1846 – May 1847. Colonel William T. Haskell
- 3rd Regiment of Tennessee Volunteers, for the duration; October 1847 – July 1848. Colonel Benjamin F. Cheatham (late Capt. in Campbell's Regt.)
- 4th Regiment of Tennessee Volunteers, for the duration, (9 companies); November 1847 – August 1848. Colonel Richard Waterhouse (late Major in Thomas' Regt. Cav.)
- 5th Regiment of Tennessee Volunteers, for the duration, (11 companies); December 1847 – July 1848. Colonel George R. McClellan

=== Texas ===
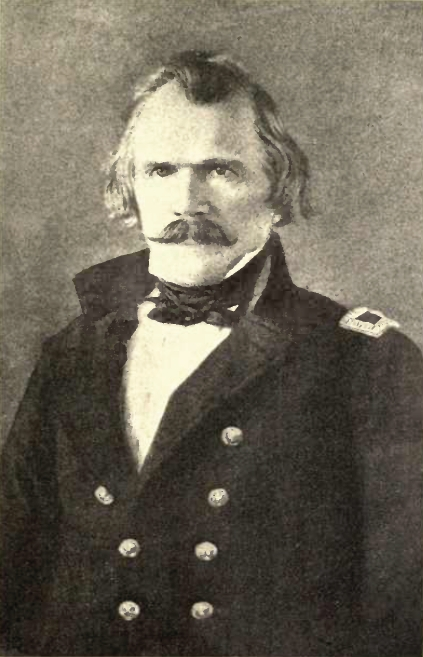
Albert Sidney Johnston

- General Staff of Texas Volunteers; July 1846 – October 1846. Major General (Gov.) James Pinckney Henderson.
- 1st Regiment of Texas Mounted Rifle Volunteers, June and July, and discharged September and October 1846. Colonel John C. Hays (late Major of a Batt. in the service of Texas.)
- 2nd Regiment of Texas Mounted Volunteers, June and July, and discharged October 1846. Colonel George T. Wood
- Regiment of Texas Rifle Volunteers, May, June and July, and discharged August 1846. Colonel Albert Sidney Johnston (former Adjutant U.S. 6th Infantry and Adjutant General of Texas.)
- Regiment of Texas Mounted Volunteers, for 6 months (7 companies), for frontier defense; July, and discharged September 1846. Colonel William C. Young
- Battalion of Texas Mounted Volunteers, of (4 companies); March 1847 – June 1848. Majors comdg.: Michael H. Chevallie (late of Major Hays 1st Regt.; resigned 31 August 47); Walter P. Lane (Captain to October 1847)
- Regiment of Texas Mounted Volunteers, for 12 months and during the war; April 1847 – May 1848. Colonel John C. Hays (Col. of 1st Regt. Vols, and continued in service)
- Regiment of Texas Mounted Volunteers, for 6 months, for frontier defense; 11 May, and discharged June 1847. Colonel John C. Hays (Col. of Regt. in Mexico)
  - Battalion of Texas Mounted Volunteers,(part of Col. Hays regiment) (5 companies), for local defense; April – 5 June 1847. Major Thomas J. Smith
- Independent Companies of Texas Volunteers:
  - 1st Mounted Company; 25 September 1845 – 25 June 1846. Captain John T. Price
  - 2nd Company of Rangers; September and 10 December 1845 and March 1846, for two periods of 3 months each – July 1846. Captain Peter Hansbrough Bell (had before served on frontier defence of Texas, under Major Hays from September 1845)
  - 3rd Mounted Company; 1 October 1845 and January 1846 – September 1846. Captain David C. Cady
  - 4th Mounted Company; May and August 1846 – 18 September 1846. Captain Benjamin McCulloch
  - 5th Mounted Company; July–October 1846. Captain Eli Chandler
  - 6th Mounted Company; July 1846 – July 1847. Captain Mabery B. Gray (late 1st Lt. in Bell's co.)
  - 7th Company of Foot Volunteers (first enrolled in Mississippi); August 1846 – 7 January 1847. Captain William E. Shivors (late Capt in Johnston's 3rd Rifle Regt.)
  - 8th Rifle Company; (late Seefeld's Company of Johnston's 3rd Regt.); received 1 September 1846 – 1 July 1847. Captain P. Edward Connor (late 1st Lt. to December 1846: wounded at Buena Vista; retired May 1847.)
  - 9th J Company Volunteers (at Monterey); 8 October 1846 – October 1847. Captain Mirabeau B. Lamar (late Division Inspector to Maj. Gen. Henderson)
  - 10th I Company Volunteers; October 1846 – October 1847. Captain Shapley Prince Ross
  - 11th Mounted Company of Spies; 31 January – 31 July 1847. Captain Ben McCulloch (Major in the Staff)

=== Virginia ===
- Regiment of Virginia Volunteers, for during the war with Mexico, (14 companies); December 1846 and January 1847 – August 1848. Colonel John Francis Hamtramck (former 2nd Lieutenant, 3rd U.S. Artillery Regiment)

=== Misc. volunteers ===
- Battalion of "Santa Fe" Mounted Volunteers, for during the war with Mexico, (4 companies); July and August 1847 – 20 October 1848. Major Robert Walker (late Adjutant of Price's Regt. Missouri Volunteers)

== U.S. Navy squadrons serving in the war ==
=== Home Squadron ===
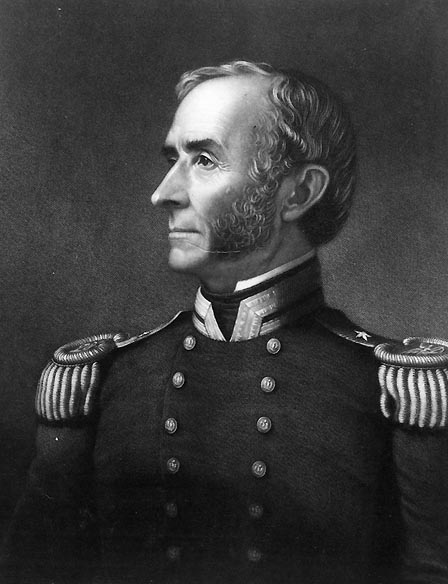
Commodore David Conner

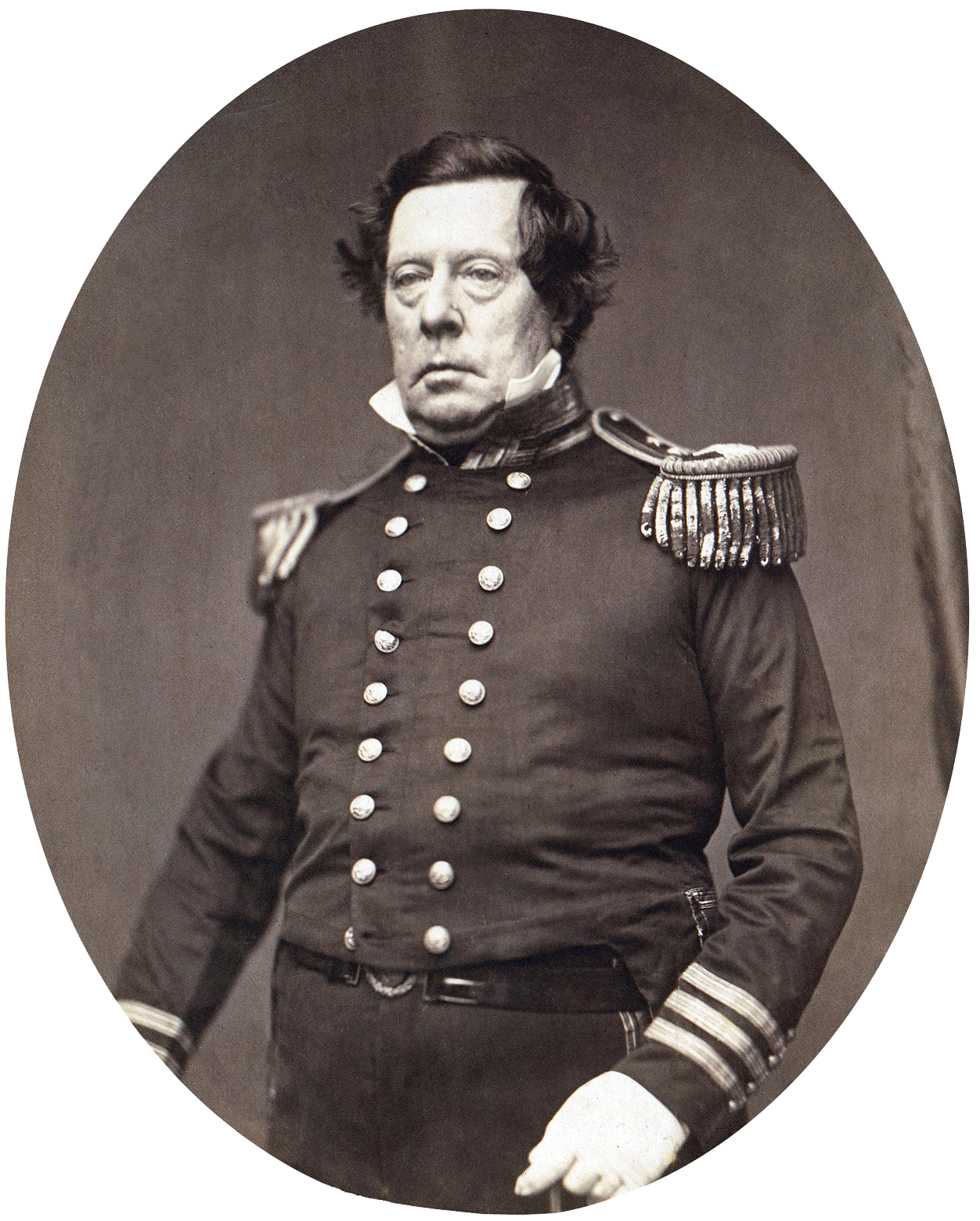
Commodore Matthew C. Perry

- The Home Squadron operated in the Gulf of Mexico and was led by Commodore David Conner. Conner was appointed to command the squadron on 30 December 1843. He was relieved by Commodore Matthew C. Perry on 3 March 1847. The Revenue Marine cutters listed in the U.S. Revenue Marine Service section of this list article were also assigned to the Home Squadron.
  - USS Albany, Captain Samuel Livingston Breese; Commander John Kelly
  - USS Bonita, Lieutenant Timothy G. Benham
  - USS Boston, Commander George F. Pearson (Note: Lost en route to join Home Squadron)
  - USS Cumberland, Captain Bladen Dulany; Captain William Jameson
  - USS Decatur, Commander Richard S. Pinckney
  - USS Electra (ex-Rolla), Lieutenant Timothy A. Hunt (Note: Purchased to serve as a supply vessel, 1847)
  - USS Etna (ex-Walcott), Commander Gershom J. Van Brunt (Note: Purchased to serve as a bomb brig, 1847)
  - USS Falcon, Lieutenant John J. Glasson
  - USS Falmouth, Commander Joseph R. Jarvis
  - USS Flirt, Lieutenant Arthur Sinclair
  - USS Fredonia, Lieutenant Frederick A. Neville
  - USS Germantown, Commander Franklin Buchanan
  - USS Hecla, (ex-I.L. Richardson), (Note: Purchased to serve as a bomb brig, 1847) Lieutenant Archibald B. Fairfax
  - Steamship Hunter (Note: 96 ton steamer on charter, November 1846. Wrecked at Isla Verde near Veracruz, Mexico 21 March 1847)
  - USS Iris, Commander Henry B. Wilson
  - USS John Adams, Commander William J. McCluney
  - USS Lawrence, Commander Samuel Mercer
  - USS Mahonese (Note: Mexican merchant schooner seized from Mexico and commissioned into the U.S. Navy)
  - USS Mississippi, Captain Andrew Fitzhugh
  - USS Morris, (ex-Laura Virginia), Lieutenant William T. Smith (Note: Merchant schooner taken as a prize at Tabasco, Mexico and commissioned into the U.S. Navy)
  - USS Nonata, (Note: Captured from Mexico) Lieutenant Samuel F. Hazard
  - USS Ohio, Captain Silas H. Stringham (Note: Ohio served with the Home Squadron and Pacific Squadron)
  - USS Onkahye, Lieutenant Arthur Sinclair, 1845
  - USS Perry, Lieutenant George S. Blake
  - USS Petrel, Lieutenant T. Darrah Shaw
  - USS Petrita, (ex-Champion), (Note: Merchant steamer taken as a prize at Tabasco, Mexico and commissioned into the U.S. Navy) Lieutenant Samuel Lockwood
  - USS Porpoise, Lieutenant William E. Hunt
  - USS Potomac, Captain John Gwinn
  - USS Princeton, Commodore Robert F. Stockton
  - USS Raritan, Captain Francis H. Gregory
  - USS Reefer, Lieutenant Isaac Sterrett
  - USS Relief, Lieutenant Oscar Bullus
  - USS St. Mary's, Commander John L. Saunders
  - USS Santa Anna (Note: Schooner revenue cutter acquired from the Republic of Texas.)
  - USS Saratoga, Commander Irvine Shubrick, 1845; Commander David G. Farragut
  - USS Scorpion, Commander Abraham Bigelow
  - USS Scourge, Lieutenant Charles G. Hunter
  - USS Somers, Commander Duncan N. Ingraham
  - USS Spitfire, Commander Josiah Tattnall III
  - USS Stromboli (ex-Howard) (Note: Purchased to serve as a bomb brig, 1847)
  - USS Supply, Lieutenant John De Camp
  - USS Tampico, (ex-Pueblano), (Note: Schooner seized at Tampico, Mexico and commissioned into the U.S. Navy) Lieutenant William P. Griffin
  - USS Truxtun, Commander Edward W. Carpender
  - USS Union (Note: Schooner seized at Tampico, Mexico and commissioned into the U.S. Navy)
  - USS Vesuvius, (ex-St. Marys), (Note: Purchased to serve as a bomb brig, 1847) Commander George H. Magruder
  - USS Vixen, Commander Joshua Sands
  - USS Washington, Lieutenant Samuel P. Lee
  - USS Water Witch, Lieutenant George M. Totten

=== Pacific Squadron ===
- The Pacific Squadron operated off the Pacific coast of California and Mexico and was led by Commodore John D. Sloat until 29 July 1846; Commodore Robert F. Stockton, 29 July 1846 – 22 January 1847; Commodore W. Branford Shubrick, 22 January 1847 – 1 March 1847. Commodore James Biddle, 1 March 1847 – 19 July 1847. Commodore W. Branford Shubrick, 19 July 1847 – 6 May 1848. Commodore Thomas ap Catesby Jones from 6 May 1848.

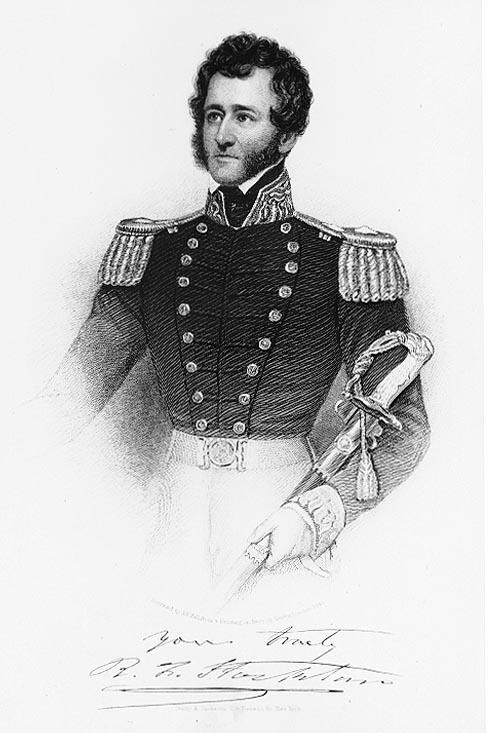
Commodore Robert F. Stockton

  - USS Columbus, Captain Thomas W. Wyman
  - USS Congress, Commander Samuel F. Du Pont
  - USS Cyane, Captain William Mervine, Commander Samuel F. Du Pont
  - USS Dale, Commander William H. McKean
  - USS Erie, Lieutenant James M. Watson
  - USS Independence, Captain Elie A. F. La Vallette
  - USS Julia, (Note: Captured September 1846 at La Paz, Baja California.) Lieutenant George L. Selden
  - USS Levant, Commander Hugh N. Page
  - USS Lexington, Lieutenant Theodore Bailey
  - USS Libertad, Lieutenant Tunis Augustus Macdonough Craven (Note: Chartered at La Paz, Baja California, October 1847)
  - USS Malek Adhel, (Note: Captured September 1846 at Mazatlan.) Lieutenant William B. Renshaw
  - USS Ohio, Captain Silas H. Stringham (Note: Ohio served with the Home Squadron and Pacific Squadron)
  - USS Portsmouth, Commander John B. Montgomery
  - USS Preble, Commander William F. Shields
  - USS Savannah, Captain James Armstrong
  - USS Shark, Lieutenant Neil M. Howison
  - USS Southampton, Lieutenant Robert B. Thorburn
  - USS Warren, Commander Joseph B. Hull
  - USS Whiton, Lieutenant Frederick Chatard
  - Battalion of Sailors, from the fleet on the Pacific coast, organized by Commodore Robert F. Stockton, for the recapture of Los Angeles, California, January 1847. Major Stephen C. Rowan (Lieutenant U.S. Navy)
    - Artillery Company. Captain Richard L. Tilghman (Lieutenant)
    - A Company. Captain John Guest (Acting master)
    - B Company. Captain William B. Renshaw (Lieutenant)
    - C Company. Captain Benjamin F. B. Hunter (Acting Lieutenant)
    - D Company. Captain Edward Higgins (Acting Lieutenant)
    - E Company. Captain J. Fenwick Stenson (Acting Lieutenant)
    - F Company. Captain James M. Duncan (Passed Midshipman)
    - G Company. Captain John Peed (Sailmaker)
    - Sappers and Miners. Captain John Southwick (Carpenter)

== U.S. Marine Corps ==
- Many of the U.S. Navy Home and Pacific Squadron ships had detachments of U.S. Marine Corps personnel aboard used as ship's guards and as landing party. They were under the direction of the captain of the ship they were assigned. Marine detachments from Home Squadron ships were used as landing party in the capture of Veracruz. Marines under the command of Captain Alvin Edson, USMC, were used to capture and hold Tabasco. The town was garrisoned by a detachment of Marines commanded by Lieutenant William B. Slack, USMC. During the capture of Monterey, 85 Marines and more than 140 sailors from Cyane, Levant, and Savannah were landed and commanded by Captain William Mervine, USN. Seventeen Marines and 57 sailors from Dale were landed and captured La Paz in October 1847. Dale also captured Guayamas in November using 17 Marines and 50 sailors under the command of Lieutenant Thomas O. Selfridge, USN. Marines from Independence, Cyane, and Congress were tasked with garrisoning San Jose in November 1847
- Battalion of Marines; March 1847. Attached to the 3rd Artillery Regiment for garrison duty near Veracruz.
- Battalion of Marines; May 1847 – January 1848. Brevet Lieutenant Colonel Samuel E. Watson. Attached to Brigadier General John A. Quitman's 4th Division consisting of volunteers from New York, Pennsylvania, and South Carolina. Served at the Battle of Chapultepec 13 September 1847.

== U.S. Revenue Marine ==
- The following Revenue Marine cutters were dispatched to serve under the command of the "Commanding General of the Army of Occupation" on 19 May 1846 under orders from the Secretary of the Treasury Robert J. Walker. The squadron was tasked with convoy, towing, and blockade duties as well as transporting troops, supplies, mail, and dispatches for the U.S. Army and was also ordered to cooperate with the U.S. Navy. The squadron was under the overall command of Captain John A. Webster, Sr., who chose Ewing as his flagship. Webster served as squadron commander until 10 December 1846 when he was taken ill by a fever. He was relieved by Captain Winslow Foster who served as squadron commander thereafter.
  - McLane. Captain William A. Howard, 16 May 1846 – 4 June 1847
  - Spencer. Captain Caleb Currier, 16 May 1846 – 14 July 1846 (Note: Spencer suffered a boiler firebox burnout while underway from Charleston, South Carolina. After repairs were made she was underway again and the boilers failed once more, Captain Currier returned Spencer to Charleston on 17 June 1846. On 14 July Currier was ordered to sail under canvas to Philadelphia, Pennsylvania and report to the Collector of Customs. The machinery from the cutter was sold shortly thereafter and the hull was used for a lightship.)
  - Legare. Captain N.L. Coste, 16 May 1846 – 26 October 1846
  - Woodbury. Captain William B. Whitehead, 16 May 1846 – 9 July 1846
  - Ewing. Captain Gay Moore, 16 May 1846 – 15 April 1847
  - Forward. Captain Henry B. Nones, 16 May 1846 – 30 April 1847
  - Van Buren. Captain Thomas C. Rudolph, 16 May 1846 – 31 October 1846
- Four additional cutters were dispatched under either separate orders or at a later date.
  - Bibb. Captain Winslow Foster, 7 January 1847 – 31 May 1847
  - Morris. Captain Green Walden, 16 May 1846 – 2 November 1846 (Note: Morris was dispatched to Key West, Florida to protect American shipping entering the Gulf of Mexico from Mexican privateers. She was damaged by a hurricane on 11 October 1846 and a board of survey held by the Collector of Customs at Key West determined that Morris was not worth the cost of repair.)
  - Wolcott. Captain Louis C. Fatio (to 1 September 1846), Captain Levy C. Harby (from 1 September 1846), 16 May 1846 – 11 May 1847. Used for carrying dispatches from Mexico to New Orleans, Louisiana.
  - Polk. Placed under the command of Lieutenant W.S. Ogdon, U.S. Navy, 14 March 1846 – 3 May 1846 (Note: Polk put to sea from Ocracoke Inlet on 31 March 1846 but she leaked badly and was sailed to Norfolk, Virginia for repairs. Repairs were completed and Polk put back to sea once more only to be condemned by Captain Ogdon as unseaworthy. She was turned back to the Treasury Department on 3 May.)

== Notes ==
Footnotes

Citations

References used

- Post Returns, Los Angeles, March and April 1847, National Archives and Records Administration (NARA); Washington, D.C.; Returns from U.S. Military Posts, 1800–1916; Microfilm Serial: M617; Microfilm Roll: 1521
- "Record of Movements, Vessels of the United States Coast Guard, 1790 – December 31, 1933 (1989 reprint)" (PDF). U.S. Coast Guard Historian's Office.
- Allen, James (10 July 1846). "James Allen Letter". Harold B. Lee Library. Brigham Young University.
- Bauer, K. Jack (1969). Surfboats and Horse Marines: U.S. Naval Operations in the Mexican War, 1846–48. Annapolis, Maryland: U.S. Naval Institute.
- Canney, Donald L. (1995). U.S. Coast Guard and Revenue Cutters, 1790–1935. Naval Institute Press, Annapolis, Maryland. ISBN 978-1-55750-101-1.
- Clark, Francis D. (1882). The first regiment of New York volunteers, commanded by Col. Jonathan D. Stevenson, in the Mexican war. New York: G. S. Evans.
- Evans, Stephen H. (1949). The United States Coast Guard 1790–1915: A Definitive History. Naval Institute Press, Annapolis, Maryland.
- Fleek, Sherman L. (2006). History May Be Searched in Vain: A Military History of the Mormon Battalion. Spokane, Washington: Arthur H. Clark Company (now University of Oklahoma Press, Norman, Oklahoma). ISBN 978-0870623431.
- Kemp, L.W. "Ross, Shapley Prince". Handbook of Texas Online.
- King, Irving H. (1989). The Coast Guard Under Sail: The U.S. Revenue Cutter Service, 1789–1865. Naval Institute Press, Annapolis, Maryland. ISBN 978-0-87021-234-5.
- Millett, Allan R. (1991). Semper Fidelis: The History of the United States Marine Corps (The Revised and Expanded ed.). New York City, New York: The Free Press. ISBN 0-02-921595-1.
- Noble, Dennis L. (1990). Historical Register U.S. Revenue Cutter Service Officers, 1790–1914 (PDF). Coast Guard Historian's Office, U.S. Coast Guard Headquarters, Washington, DC.
- Polk, James K. (1929). Nevins, Allan (ed.). Polk: the Diary of a President, 1845–1849. New York City, New York and London, England: Longmans, Green & Co., OCLC 783494
- Robarts, William Hugh (1887). "Mexican War veterans : a complete roster of the regular and volunteer troops in the war between the United States and Mexico, from 1846 to 1848; the volunteers are arranged by states, alphabetically". Archive.org. Washington, D. C.: Brentano's, (A.S. Witherbee & Co., Proprietors).
- Smith, Horatio Davis (1932). "Early History of the United States Revenue Marine Service or (United States Revenue Cutter Service 1789–1849) (1989 Reprint)" (PDF). U.S. Coast Guard History. U.S. Coast Guard Historian's Office.
