= USRC Forward (1842) =

Revenue cutter of the United States

History

United States
- Namesake: Walter P. Forward, 15th United States Secretary of the Treasury
- Operator: United States Revenue-Marine
- Awarded: 7 December 1841
- Builder: William Easby, Washington, D.C.
- Cost: US$3,786.75
- Launched: 1842
- Acquired: 23 April 1842
- Commissioned: 23 June 1842
- Decommissioned: 30 November 1865.
- Stricken: 1865
- Honors and awards: U.S. Navy commendation for service in the Mexican-American War
- Fate: Sold on 30 November 1865 in Baltimore, Maryland

General characteristics
- Type: Topsail schooner.
- Displacement: 139 tons.
- Length: 89 ft (27 m)
- Beam: 21 ft 2 in (6.45 m)
- Draft: 8 ft 6 in (2.59 m)
- Propulsion: Sail.
- Sail plan: Topsail.
- Armament: 2 × 18-pounder; 4 × 9-pounders(1845)

USRC Walter Forward was a schooner constructed for service with the United States Revenue-Marine. She was more commonly known as USRC Forward. Forward served with the United States Army and United States Navy in Mexican waters during the Mexican–American War and was commended for her actions during the Tabasco River landings by Commodore Matthew C. Perry, U.S. Navy. After the war, she was transferred to the United States Coast Survey for a short time as USCS Walter Forward before being returned to the Revenue-Marine for service during the 1850s and the American Civil War.

== Construction and commissioning ==
The cutter Forward was built in Washington, D.C., at a cost of US$3,786.75 by William Easby with construction was supervised by Captain Henry Prince, Revenue-Marine. Prince apparently captained Forward from 23 April 1842 to 18 April 1843. Forward was a topsail schooner of conventional copper-sheathed wood-hull construction with no machinery on board, was 89 ft (27 m) long and had a displacement of 139 tons. She was designed to enforce customs laws and to assist mariners in distress. Forward was named for Walter P. Forward, 15th United States Secretary of the Treasury

== Early service ==
Forward was commissioned 23 June 1842 and was initially assigned patrol duties at Baltimore, Maryland. On 18 April 1843, she exchanged crews with USRC Wolcott and was assigned a homeport of Wilmington, Delaware. On 16 May 1846 she received orders to report to Philadelphia, Pennsylvania for repairs in preparation to being assigned duties with the U.S. Army and U.S. Navy during the Mexican–American War.

== Mexican–American War operations ==
=== Service with the U.S. Army ===
She set sail for the gulf on 23 May 1846 in company with another cutter, USRC Ewing, and arrived at Southwest Pass of the Mississippi River on 19 June 1846. There, General Zachary Taylor ordered the ship to blockade a stretch of the Mexican coast near Soto la Marina and capture any ships engaged in trade with the enemy. The squadron that Forward was assigned to perform scouting, convoy, towing, and blockade duties as well transporting troops and supplies for the Army and occupied her during mid-summer 1846.

=== Service with the U.S. Navy ===
On 23 August 1846, she received orders to report to Commodore David Conner's naval squadron off Tampico, Mexico. Four days later, she entered the anchorage at Antón Lizardo and began patrolling off Tampico. That assignment lasted until 15 September 1846 when she received orders transferring her to the U.S. Navy under Commodore Conner at which time she moved farther down the coast to join the blockade of Veracruz. In mid-October 1846, she joined a force commanded by Commodore Matthew Calbraith Perry, U.S. Navy. On 15 October 1846, Perry's squadron attempted to cross the bar at the mouth of the river at Alvarado. The steamer USS Vixen led the way and succeeded in making her crossing, Forward followed, in tow of sister revenue cutter, USRC McLane. McLane grounded on the bar while the three ships she towed fouled each other's towlines. Vixen engaged the Mexican batteries on shore but, when it became apparent that McLane would never succeed in getting across the bar, she and her tows retired. Luckily, McLane came off the bar, and all American ships retired. On 16 October Forward set sail for a similar, but far more successful, amphibious operation at the mouth of the Tabasco River. Successfully navigating the bar on 23 October 1846, the force quickly seized the town of Frontera and took several prizes in the process. Forward and the other small steamers attached to Perry's force then continued the foray, sailing 74 mi (119 km) up the river through hostile territory to the town of Tabasco. Forward supplied part of her crew as a landing party along with Marines that were from USS Vixen and they captured the town of Tabasco. The flotilla seized 10 vessels as prizes before returning to the ocean on 26 October 1846. However, Forward along with McLane remained at Frontera until late November 1846, engaged in the destruction of the captured Mexican shipping and maintaining a blockade of the river. (Note: Forward and McLane captured steamer Petrita, steamer Tabasguena, brig Rentville, and schooner Compeche during their service.) She departed the area on 21 November 1846 and returned to the base at Anton Lizardo on 21 November 1846. In December 1846, Forward left the Mexican coast to carry dispatches to Belize City in British Honduras and New Orleans, Louisiana. She returned to blockade duty on 7 February 1847 and took station off Veracruz once again on 9 February 1847. She continued routine blockade operations at various points along the eastern coast of Mexico until April 1847. On 15 April 1847, she received orders to set sail for Wilmington voyaging by way of New Orleans, and reached her destination on 23 May 1847. Repairs completed in the summer of 1847 after reaching Wilmington cost about US$2,500. Forward received a commendation from Commodore Perry for her participation in the Tabasco River landings, where-in he said in part:

I am gratified to bear witness to the valuable services of the Revenue Schooner Forward, in command of Captain Nones, and to the skill and gallantry of her officers and men.

== Transfer to the U.S. Coast Survey ==
On 30 October 1847, Forward was transferred to the United States Coast Survey. On 16 December the Revenue-Marine traded the Coast Survey the newly commissioned steamer USRC Walker for Forward. Forward returned to Revenue-Marine service 6 March 1848 with a home port of Wilmington.

== 1848–1861 ==
On 6 January 1854 she was one of six Revenue-Marine cutters stationed along the Atlantic coast ordered to search for the disabled steamer San Francisco in the vicinity of Bermuda. After failing to locate the vessel the search was called off 18 January. On 20 April 1856 she was sent to the Philadelphia Navy Yard for repairs with the repairs completed by 27 June. She returned to the yard on 21 October 1857 for additional repairs and was able to return to service at Wilmington 1 December. On 26 April 1861 she was ordered to Philadelphia to receive additional armament and to cooperate with the U.S. Navy.

== American Civil War service ==
On 4 May 1861, she sailed for Annapolis, Maryland under the orders of General Benjamin F. Butler where she was tasked with keeping Chesapeake Bay open for troop transports from Perryville, Maryland to Annapolis and to "capture or sink any unfriendly craft, after taking out their crews". This duty proved difficult for the schooner to perform and the captain of Forward sometimes had to ask any passing steamers for a tow. On 20 July she sailed from Annapolis to Baltimore and was stationed at the mouth of Severn River on 31 August. On 1 October Forward was returned to Revenue-Marine control and she returned to Philadelphia on 19 October for repairs before reporting to New York City, New York on 4 February 1862. On 20 February she resumed duties at Wilmington and remained there until ordered to assume blockade duties at Beaufort, North Carolina on 3 June. Forward arrived at Beaufort 27 June and was said to have remained there until 18 November 1865. However, on 31 January 1863, she assisted in extinguishing a fire which had broken out on the full-rigged ship Joseph Gilchrist at New York.

== Post-war decommissioning and sale ==
Forward arrived at Baltimore on 29 November 1865 and was ordered de-commissioned and sold on 30 November for approximately $5,000.

== See also ==
- Union blockade

== Notes ==
Footnotes

Citations

References used

- "And Other Duties as Assigned" (PDF). Pickled Fish and Salted Provisions, Volume VIII, Number 2. Salem Maritime National Historic Site, Salem, Massachusetts: U.S. Department of the Interior, National Park Service. October 2006. Archived from the original (PDF) on 8 February 2008.
- "Forward, 1842" (PDF). Cutters, Craft & U.S. Coast Guard-Manned Army & Navy Vessels. U.S. Coast Guard Historian's Office.
- "Record of Movements, Vessels of the United States Coast Guard, 1790–December 31, 1933 (1989 reprint)" (PDF). U.S. Coast Guard Historian's Office.
- Canney, Donald L. (1995). U.S. Coast Guard and Revenue Cutters, 1790–1935. Naval Institute Press, Annapolis, Maryland. ISBN 978-1-55750-101-1.
- Evans, Stephen H. (1949). The United States Coast Guard 1790–1915: A Definitive History. Naval Institute Press, Annapolis, Maryland.
- King, Irving H. (1989). The Coast Guard Under Sail: The U.S. Revenue Cutter Service, 1789–1865. Naval Institute Press, Annapolis, Maryland. ISBN 978-0-87021-234-5.
- Noble, Dennis L. (1990). Historical Register U.S. Revenue Cutter Service Officers, 1790–1914. Coast Guard Historian's Office, U.S. Coast Guard Headquarters, Washington, DC.
- Smith, Horatio Davis (1932). "Early History of the United States Revenue Marine Service or (United States Revenue Cutter Service), 1789–1849 (1989 reprint)" (PDF). U.S. Coast Guard History. U.S. Coast Guard Historian's Office.
