= Joshua Sands =

Joshua Sands may refer to:

- Joshua Sands (politician) (1757-1835), U.S. Representative and Collector of the Port of New York
- Joshua R. Sands (1795–1883), United States Navy officer
