= Alessa Flores =

Mexican human rights activist (1988–2016)

- Born: 20 May 1988; Frontera, Tabasco, Mexico
- Died: 13 October 2016 (aged 28); Cuauhtémoc, Mexico City, Mexico
- Cause of death: Strangulation
- Occupations: Human rights activist Sex worker
- Years active: 2012–2016
- Known for: Advocating for the rights of transgender sex workers in Mexico City

Alessa Méndez Flores (20 May 1988 – 13 October 2016) was a Mexican human rights activist, known for her advocacy for transgender people and sex workers in Mexico City. Flores hosted a YouTube channel and was a member of several human rights organisations up to her murder in 2016.

== Activism ==
Flores was born and raised in Frontera, Tabasco, before moving to live with her grandfather in Tamaulipas. After struggling to find work and having limited support from her family, Flores started sex working, eventually moving to Mexico City in 2012, where she first became involved with human rights organisations and collectives.

While in Mexico City, Flores started a YouTube channel titled "Memorias de una puta" (lit. 'Memoirs of a Whore'), in which she posted videos debunking myths and assumptions about transgender people and sex workers. She stated that "sex work isn't bad, but it shouldn't be the only option either". In 2013, Flores joined the Red de Jóvenes Trans (lit. 'Trans Youth Network'), where she led workshops and participated in discussion panels. She was also a member of the Movimiento Diversidad Progresista (lit. 'Progressive Diversity Movement').

In 2015, Flores and fellow activist Jessica Marjane Durán were harassed by security guards while using a public bathroom at the Reforma 22 shopping centre in Mexico City. The guards demanded the women's identification documents and ultimately denied them access to the bathroom. They subsequently filed a lawsuit for physical and moral damages, which was later heard at the Supreme Court of Mexico in 2020.

On 15 November 2015, Flores took part in Mexico City's newly declared Día de la Población Trans (lit. 'Trans People Day'), which she had campaigned for for several years. That same month, she posted a video reading the names of murdered transgender women in Mexico, and expressed her hope that she would not be killed because she wanted to "do things with [her] life".

== Death ==
In early October 2016, Flores participated in the Foro Capital Transjóvenes (lit. 'Trans Youth Capital Forum') at the Instituto de la Juventud de la Ciudad de México (lit. 'Mexico City Youth Institute'). She argued against the stigmatisation of sex workers for "selling" their bodies, likening their experiences as similar to factory workers and office workers.

A week later, on 13 October 2016, Flores was found dead in a hotel room in the Obrera neighbourhood of Cuauhtémoc in Mexico City. Her body showed signs of strangulation, and was found two weeks after the killing of another trans sex worker, Paola Ledezma, in the city. Flores' mother, Cecilia Flores, alleged that Mexican authorities were "ignoring" her requests for information about the investigation into her daughter's death.

On 13 November 2016, on the second Día de la Población Trans, activists and sex workers marched in Mexico City demanding justice for Flores and Ledezma, as well as other transgender people killed in Mexico.

Rebeca Peralta, the vice president of the Diversity Commission at the Congress of Mexico City, requested that Flores' death be officially considered a femicide; it was not automatically listed as being such due to Flores being considered legally male.

As of 2020, Flores' murder remains unsolved.
