= USS Vixen (1846) =

Steamboat in the United States Navy

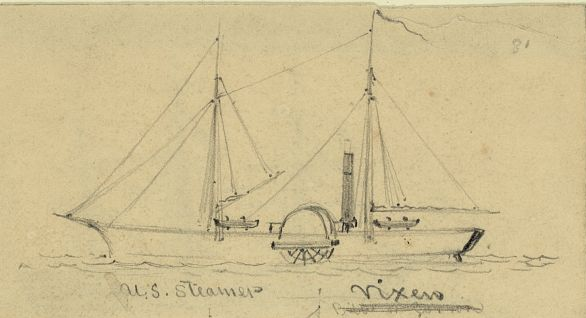
- USS Vixen

History

United States
- Name: USS Vixen
- Builder: Brown and Bell, New York City
- Acquired: by purchase, May 1846
- Decommissioned: 1853
- Fate: Sold, 1855

General characteristics
- Type: Gunboat
- Displacement: 240 long tons (244 t)
- Length: 118 ft (36 m)
- Beam: 22 ft 6 in (6.86 m)
- Draft: 7 ft (2.1 m)
- Propulsion: Steam engine
- Speed: 7.5 knots (13.9 km/h; 8.6 mph)
- Complement: 55 officers and enlisted
- Armament: 1 × 8 in (200 mm) shell gun; 2 × 32-pounder carronades

The third USS Vixen was a steamboat in the United States Navy during the Mexican–American War.

Vixen was originally built for the government of Mexico by Brown and Bell of New York City, she was purchased by the Navy in May 1846 at the outset of the Mexican–American War.

== Service history ==
=== Mexican–American War, 1846–1848 ===
Immediately after her purchase, Vixen was deployed off the Gulf Coast of Mexico with Commodore David Conner's blockade squadron. There, she performed numerous patrol and reconnaissance assignments and was helpful in securing the Mexican coast in preparation for combined Army–Navy movements inland. Under the command of Joshua R. Sands, Vixen first saw action on 16 October 1846 when she participated in the unsuccessful attempt to take Alvarado, Mexico, the most important Mexican port east of Vera Cruz. During the engagement, she towed the schooners Bonita and Reefer but, together with the rest of the American fleet, was unable to cross the bar off the port and soon broke off the attack.

After this initial failure, the squadron moved south in an attempt to cut off the Yucatán Peninsula from the rest of Mexico. Success hinged upon the capture of the coastal port of Frontera, at the mouth of the Tabasco River, followed by the surrender of the city of Tabasco, upstream. Vixen and the rest of the squadron maneuvered into position off Frontera on 23 October. Commodore Matthew C. Perry assumed command of the gunboat and, with the schooners Bonita and USRC Forward in tow, dashed across the bar and captured the Mexican flotilla defending the port. Vixen and Perry ascended the Tabasco River on the 24th and 25th with other vessels of the squadron and finally secured Tabasco on the 26th after a three-shot bombardment of the city by Vixen.

Vixen returned to the blockade immediately after the successful conclusion of the Yucatán campaign and later participated in the capture of Laguna, on 20 September. She also assisted in the capture of Tampico, on 14 November and covered troop landings at Vera Cruz, the main military objective of the fleet, on 9 March 1847. After Mexican defenders rejected peace overtures, the American squadron attacked the city on the 23rd; and, two days later, Spitfire and Vixen made a daring and visually spectacular close range assault upon defensive fortifications ashore. Vera Cruz finally surrendered unconditionally on the 28th. This stunning victory enabled General Winfield Scott to march on Mexico City by the shortest overland route and, as such, was the decisive action of the Mexican War.

=== Home Squadron, 1848–1854 ===
Vixen conducted clean-up operations with the squadron for the duration of the war. After the ratification of the Treaty of Guadalupe Hidalgo on 30 May 1848, she joined the Home Squadron and underwent repairs at the Washington Navy Yard in 1850. The gunboat was temporarily decommissioned at Pensacola, Florida, in 1853 after numerous fatal outbreaks of yellow fever swept her and underwent further repairs at the Brooklyn Navy Yard in 1854.

Vixen was sold in 1855.
