= Merrill Shell Bank Light =

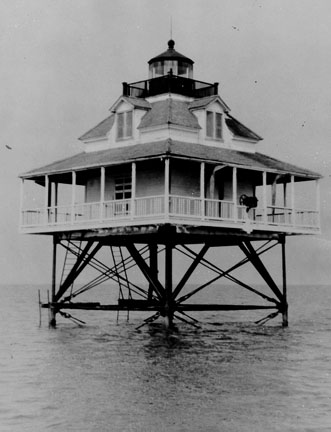
- undated photograph of Merrill Shell Bank Light (USCG)
- Location: Mississippi Sound south of Pass Christian
- Coordinates: 30.2425°N 89.2489°W

Tower
- Constructed: 1860 (first house); 1883 (second house)
- Foundation: Screw-pile
- Construction: square wooden house
- Automated: 1932

Light
- Deactivated: 1945
- Focal height: 42 ft (13 m)

The Merrill Shell Bank Light was a screw-pile lighthouse which once stood on its eponymous shoal in the Mississippi Sound, west of Cat Island and south of Pass Christian, Mississippi. It was replaced by a skeleton tower on the same foundation.

== History ==
The shoal was first marked by the hull of the former revenue cutter McLane serving as a lightship beginning in 1847, but this was replaced by a screw-pile light in 1860. The light was extinguished by the Confederates but was undamaged, and was re-lit in 1863. The house was damaged by fire in 1880, and was utterly destroyed in 1883 by another fire; it was rebuilt the same year. In 1932 it was automated, and in 1945 the house was removed and replaced by a skeleton tower on the same foundation. This tower was damaged by the hurricanes of 2005 and was discontinued in 2007.
