= Arkansas Militia and the Mexican–American War =

The history of the Arkansas Militia and the Mexican–American War began when the Territory of Arkansas gained admission to the Union as the 25th State on June 15, 1836. Within days the State Governor received a request for troops to relieve federal troops securing the border with Mexico. Ironically the Arkansas National Guard found itself conducting similar missions during the Mexican Expedition of 1916 and again during Operation Jump Start in 2006. Arkansans enthusiastically supported the Mexican–American War in 1846 and many future leaders of the Arkansas Confederate forces gained valuable experience during the conflict. The performance of Arkansas troops during the invasion of northern Mexico and the Battle of Buena Vista did not bring great credit to the state. Following the Mexican–American War, the state's militia forces again fell into decline until the administration of Governor Elias Nelson Conway, just before the outbreak of the Civil War.

== Statehood, a call to arms ==
The first use of the Arkansas State Militia occurred in the same month that Arkansas was admitted to the union, June 1836. Several events contributed to the Federal Government's call for troops from Arkansas. The Second Seminole War began in Florida in 1836, at the same time, the Texas War of Independence was underway. Federal Government removed its regular army troops from forts and posts in the Indian Territory in order to supply troops for the fighting in Florida. Many of the remaining regular army troops were transferred to posts along the Sabine River, positioned to either prevent a Mexican invasion or to assist the Texas revolution as directed. President Jackson asked for and was granted funds by Congress to raise a volunteer force from Arkansas to help fill the void left by regular forces along the border with the Indian Territory. Secretary of War Lewis Cass issued a call for troops to Territorial Governor William Savin Fulton on May 15, 1836. Fulton responded by issuing a proclamation calling for 1,000 volunteers. The volunteers were to assemble into companies, elect officers and report to the Governor immediately. The Governor's proclamation was published in the same edition of the Arkansas Gazette that reported on the passage in Congress of the act which admitted Arkansas to the Union.

=== Arkansas Regiment of Mounted Gunmen ===
On June 28, 1836, 13 days after the state was admitted to the Union, General Edmund P. Gains (U.S. Army) called upon the Governor to furnish one regiment for the defense of the western frontier. Governor Fulton responded by revising his call for volunteers. The Governor's call specified that the volunteer companies raised North of the Arkansas River would rendezvous at Little Rock, while those raised South of the river would rendezvous at Washington in Hempstead County. The organization of the Volunteer Companies played out against the backdrop of the first political race for the office of Governor of Arkansas. Absalom Fowler, a Whig candidate, ran against James S. Conway, a Jacksonian Democrat. Conway won the hotly contested race in the election conducted on August 1, 1836. By August 18, 1836, Volunteer Companies from Conway, Pope and Pulaski counties had gathered in Little Rock. These three companies marched south for the rendezvous at Washington, Arkansas, and were joined en route by a company from Saline County. These four companies made the rendezvous at Washington with the company raised from Hempstead County, bringing the total to five companies. Being short of the number of companies needed to form a regiment, the unit was formed initially into a battalion, to be commanded by a lieutenant colonel. An election was held at Washington, Arkansas, and Absalom Fowler, the former candidate for Governor, was elected lieutenant colonel of the battalion. The other officers were as follows:

County	Rank	Name
	Lieutenant Colonel	Absalom Fowler
	Adjutant	Robertson Childress
	Sergeant Major	Samuel D. Blackburn
	Quarter Master	Allen Martin
	Surgeon	Dr. James Bird
Conway Company	Captain	Thomas Mathers
	1st Lieutenant	Alexander G. McFarland
	2nd Lieutenant	Peter Kuykendall
Saline Company	Captain	Robert Brazil
	1st Lieutenant	Jesse Spencer
	2nd Lieutenant	Johnson J. Joyner
Pulaski Company	Captain	John R. Cummins
	1st Lieutenant	William Badgett
	2nd Lieutenant	William W. White
Pope Company	Captain	Laban C. Howell
	1st Lieutenant	John R. H. Scott
	2nd Lieutenant	Samuel Hays
Hempstead County	Captain	Samuel Moore
	1st Lieutenant	Robert L. Davis
	2nd Lieutenant	Robert Cross
Sevier County	Captain	Charles Pettigrew
	1st Lieutenant	Robert Walker
	2nd Lieutenant	William Whitehead

On the march from Washington, Arkansas, to Fort Towson, the battalion was joined by an additional company from Sevier County, bringing the total to six. The battalion reached Fort Towson on the Red River on September 14, 1836.

An additional Volunteer Company, raised in Randolph County, commanded by Captain John Kavanaught, stopped in Little Rock long enough to participate in the inauguration of the new state's first elected Governor, James S. Conway. Conway dispatched the company to join the volunteers at Fort Towson with an order directing that since the battalion would now have seven companies, in should be formed into a regiment and an election held for colonel commandant. This order was delivered to Lt. Col. Fowler on October 2, 1836, when the Randolph County company reached Camp Vose, near Fort Towson. Lt. Col. Fowler apparently did not believe that the governor had the authority to order an election because the unit was now under the control of the regular army. Nonetheless, a new election was conducted for the office of colonel commandant, adjutant and lieutenant colonel. In this second election, Captain Laban C. Howell defeated Fowler and was elected colonel. Fowler had not run for the office of lieutenant colonel, and Charles Pettigrew was elected to this office. Fowler refused to recognize the election but placed Howell, as senior captain, in acting command while Fowler traveled to Little Rock to plead his case to his former political foe, Governor Conway. Conway attempted to solve the issue by finding that while Howell had been properly elected Colonel of the Regiment, Fowler was still the duly elected Lt. Col because Conway said he had not directed an election for that office. Lt. Col. Fowler returned to the regiment and continued to claim the right of command, at one point even having Colonel Howell, and several supporters whom Fowler labeled as "mutineers", placed under arrest. General Arbuckle, who was in overall command, had to intervene by threatening to arrest Fowler in order to compel him to release Howell. Both would write letters to the paper explaining their view and Fowler would eventually demand a Court of Inquiry in order to clear his name. Two additional companies joined the regiment, one from Lawrence County commanded by Captain Willis Phillips in late October and one from Independence County commanded by Captain Marcus W. Reinhardt in late November, bringing the regiment to its final strength of nine companies. The regiment was ordered into winter quarters at Fort Gibson. Now secure in his command, Col Howell organized the regiment into the following lettered companies:

Company	Enrolment Date	County
A	August 9, 1836	Conway
B	August 12, 1836	Saline
C	August 18, 1836	Pope
D	August 31, 1836	Hempstead
E	August 13, 1836	Pulaski
F	September 3, 1836	Sevier
G	September 5, 1836	Randolph
H	November 24, 1836	Independence
I	October 31, 1836	Lawrence

While their leaders quarreled the soldiers of the Arkansas Regiment of Mounted Gunman performed scout duty and patrolled the border until they were relieved in 1837 by federal troops. Twenty two members of the 1st Regiment of Arkansas Mounted Gunmen would die in service. Causes of death included accidents and disease, but none was due to hostile action. By February 7, 1837, General Arbuckle had discharged most of the Arkansas troops to return to their homes.

=== 2nd Regiment of Arkansas Mounted Gunmen ===
Through a twist of historical irony, the 2nd Regiment of Arkansas Mounted Gunmen never came into existence, but the 1st Battalion of the 2nd Regiment did. In August 1836, General Matthew Arbuckle (U.S. Army) made a second requisition on Governor Fulton for troops and the governor responded by calling on the counties of Carroll, Crawford, Independence, Izard, Jackson, Johnson, Lawrence, Scott, Searcy and Washington to raise their militia companies. The Volunteer Companies for what was intended to become the 2nd Regiment of Arkansas Mounted Gunmen were ordered to rendezvous at either Fayetteville, or Fort Coffee, Indian Territory. Only three companies eventually answered this call for troops.

Company	Commander	Enrolled in Federal Service	County of Origin
A	Captain Onesimus Evans	September 27, 1836	Washington
B	Captain Benaiah Bateman	September 30, 1836	Independence County
C	Captain Thaddeus C. Wilson	November 26, 1836	Washington

The three responding companies were organized under a single battalion, commanded by Oneumus Evans, who was promoted to major. Major Evans signed his address to his troops at the end of their deployment as the "Commander, 1st Battalion, 2nd Regiment of Arkansas Mounted Gunmen". The muster rolls for this battalion also bear the designation of 1st Battalion, 2nd Regiment. The battalion was increased to a total of five companies in January 1837 when the first seven companies of the 1st Regiment were mustered out of service. Companies H and I of the 1st Regiment were reassigned to the 1st Battalion of the 2nd Regiment for the remainder of their service. Like their brothers in the 1st Regiment, the members of Evans Battalion spent the winter of 1836–1837 conducting patrols and Indian Territory and occasionally escorting supplies to other army posts further south along the Sabine River. The battalion was mustered out of service between March 27 and April 13 at Camp Washington, near Fort Gibson. The battalion suffered 7 deaths and 5 desertions during its service. None of the deaths were due to hostile action.

=== Aftermath ===
One Regular Army observer of the Arkansas troops on the frontier wrote to the Arkansas Gazette with the following description of their service:

So far as the Arkansas Volunteers, it is but just to say that their conduct, while they have been in Indian Territory, has been, with but few exceptions, such as to entitle them to much credit: their deportment towards the natives has ever been respectful and proper. Those volunteers... have served in both the Choctaw and Cherokee nations and have had an opportunity of seeing and of becoming acquainted with the actual condition and feeling of the Indians on the frontier towards the whites, and they will, by that means, have it in their power to.... allay the unnecessary apprehension of Indian hostilities which has to long existed on this frontier.

The fight between Absalom Fowler and Governor Conway continued to play itself out in the local papers until well into 1837, with supporters of the Governor and Colonel Howell on one side and Lieutenant Colonel Fowler each writing descriptions of the events for the papers. While the troops were deployed, the Legislature was busy passing a new militia law for the state.

== Militia law of the new state ==
At the time that the Arkansas Territory was created, it adopted all of the existing laws of its parent Territory of Missouri, including its Militia Law. The Arkansas Territorial Legislature amended the existing militia law on several occasions, but did not pass a new law of its own until after statehood. On October 23, 1836, the Arkansas Legislature passed a new Militia Law which converted the Arkansas Territorial Militia into the Arkansas State Militia.

=== Two classes of militia ===
The new law consisted of 56 sections and began by defining who was and who was not liable for militia duty. All "able-bodied free white male inhabitants of this State, between the ages of eighteen and forty-five years", were required to perform militia duty, subject to the following exemptions: "Judges of the supreme and circuit courts, secretary of state, auditor and treasurer of the State, clerks of the supreme and circuit courts, postmasters who have the care of the mails of the United States, postriders, ferrymen on all public roads, and ministers of the gospel". However, in addition to the compulsory service for all able bodied free white males, the law also authorized the raising of Volunteer Militia Companies for up to five years at a time. Each regiment was authorized to raise up to three of these Volunteer Companies, one company each of Riflemen, Artillery and Cavalry. The election of the officers of the Volunteer Companies was to be certified by the regimental commander. The Volunteer Companies were to remain under the authority of the regiment from which they were formed and were subject to the same rules and regulations as all other militiamen except that the Volunteer Companies were authorized to select their own uniforms.

=== Administration of the Militia ===
The law allowed the governor to appoint an adjutant general and a quartermaster general. The militia was to be divided into two divisions, each commanded by a major general, and each division was divided into three brigades, each commanded by a brigadier general. This organization was similar to the 1833 amendment passed by the territorial legislature, but now the general officers would be elected by the field grade officers of the militias instead of being appointed by the president. The new law set the time and place for the first election of general officers to occur in 1837. Each officer was required to wear a sword and all officers above the company grade were required to wear the uniform of their equivalent in the United States Army. The terms of service for officers were set at three years and provisions were made to allow election results to be contested. Militiamen were required to attend two company musters, one battalion muster and one regimental muster each year. Regiments were authorized and directed to conduct annual Courts Martial and provisions were made for the collections of fines levied by the Court Martial and payment of the members of the court. Parents and guardians were made liable for payment of fines on behalf of their children under the age of 21 who failed to appear at a designated muster. Money raised by payment or collection of fines was to be utilized to purchase drums, fifes and Colors. Commissioned officers were required to report to the local parade ground, with a rifle or musket, two days before the annual regimental muster for the purpose of receiving additional training to prepare them to drill their soldiers. The militia was to be trained in accordance with the regulations of the regular army of the United States. First sergeants were required to call roll no later than 10 o'clock on each day appointed for a muster to determine the number present. The law limited the amount of time that a militiaman could be called to duty to six months per tour. Any officer was authorized to call out the militia in the event of sudden invasion or insurrection. The law provided that copies of the law were to be printed and delivered to each officer, who was to hand his copy of the law to his successor upon leaving office. Many of the counties did not elect officers for their militia regiments until much later, some as late as 1845 on the eve of the war with Mexico.

=== Organization of the militia ===
The 1836 Militia Act organized the state militia into two divisions, each divided into three brigades.

Division	Brigade	Colonel	County
1st Division Maj. Gen. Seaborn G. Sneed	1st Brigade Brig. Gen. Thomas Williamson		Hot Spring
1st Division Maj. Gen. Seaborn G. Sneed	1st Brigade Brig. Gen. Thomas Williamson		Clark
1st Division Maj. Gen. Seaborn G. Sneed	1st Brigade Brig. Gen. Thomas Williamson		Pike
1st Division Maj. Gen. Seaborn G. Sneed	1st Brigade Brig. Gen. Thomas Williamson	Col. B. P. Jett	Hempstead
1st Division Maj. Gen. Seaborn G. Sneed	1st Brigade Brig. Gen. Thomas Williamson		Lafayette
1st Division Maj. Gen. Seaborn G. Sneed	1st Brigade Brig. Gen. Thomas Williamson	Col. Thomas C. P. French	Sevier
1st Division Maj. Gen. Seaborn G. Sneed	1st Brigade Brig. Gen. Thomas Williamson		Miller
1st Division Maj. Gen. Seaborn G. Sneed	2nd Brigade Brig. Gen. Richard Byrd		Saline
1st Division Maj. Gen. Seaborn G. Sneed	2nd Brigade Brig. Gen. Richard Byrd	Col. Richard C. Byrd	Pulaski
1st Division Maj. Gen. Seaborn G. Sneed	2nd Brigade Brig. Gen. Richard Byrd		White
1st Division Maj. Gen. Seaborn G. Sneed	2nd Brigade Brig. Gen. Richard Byrd	Col. Bennett B. Ball	Conway
1st Division Maj. Gen. Seaborn G. Sneed	2nd Brigade Brig. Gen. Richard Byrd	Col. William G. H. Teevault	Pope
1st Division Maj. Gen. Seaborn G. Sneed	2nd Brigade Brig. Gen. Richard Byrd	Col. Charles Huckery	Johnson
1st Division Maj. Gen. Seaborn G. Sneed	3rd Brigade Brig. Gen. Iasa Miller		Scott
1st Division Maj. Gen. Seaborn G. Sneed	3rd Brigade Brig. Gen. Iasa Miller	Col. William Reins	Crawford
1st Division Maj. Gen. Seaborn G. Sneed	3rd Brigade Brig. Gen. Iasa Miller		Franklin
1st Division Maj. Gen. Seaborn G. Sneed	3rd Brigade Brig. Gen. Iasa Miller	Col. R. W. Reynolds	Washington
1st Division Maj. Gen. Seaborn G. Sneed	3rd Brigade Brig. Gen. Iasa Miller	Col. William Walker	Benton
1st Division Maj. Gen. Seaborn G. Sneed	3rd Brigade Brig. Gen. Iasa Miller	Col. D. P. Walker	Madison
1st Division Maj. Gen. Seaborn G. Sneed	3rd Brigade Brig. Gen. Iasa Miller		Carroll
1st Division Maj. Gen. Seaborn G. Sneed	3rd Brigade Brig. Gen. Iasa Miller		Marion
2nd Division Maj. Gen. S.V.R. Ryan	4th Brigade Brig. Gen. Thomas Drew		Izard
2nd Division Maj. Gen. S.V.R. Ryan	4th Brigade Brig. Gen. Thomas Drew		Van Buren
2nd Division Maj. Gen. S.V.R. Ryan	4th Brigade Brig. Gen. Thomas Drew	Col. William S. Reeves	Independence
2nd Division Maj. Gen. S.V.R. Ryan	4th Brigade Brig. Gen. Thomas Drew	Col. George W. Cromwell	Jackson
2nd Division Maj. Gen. S.V.R. Ryan	4th Brigade Brig. Gen. Thomas Drew	Col. G. W. Ferguson	Lawrence
2nd Division Maj. Gen. S.V.R. Ryan	4th Brigade Brig. Gen. Thomas Drew		Randolph
2nd Division Maj. Gen. S.V.R. Ryan	5th Brigade Brig. Gen. Wright Elliott		Greene
2nd Division Maj. Gen. S.V.R. Ryan	5th Brigade Brig. Gen. Wright Elliott		St. Francis
2nd Division Maj. Gen. S.V.R. Ryan	5th Brigade Brig. Gen. Wright Elliott		Poinsett
2nd Division Maj. Gen. S.V.R. Ryan	5th Brigade Brig. Gen. Wright Elliott	Col. Elisha Burk	Phillips
2nd Division Maj. Gen. S.V.R. Ryan	5th Brigade Brig. Gen. Wright Elliott	Col. Wiley Lewis	Crittenden
2nd Division Maj. Gen. S.V.R. Ryan	5th Brigade Brig. Gen. Wright Elliott		Mississippi
2nd Division Maj. Gen. S.V.R. Ryan	6th Brigade Brig. Gen. John Clark		Jefferson
2nd Division Maj. Gen. S.V.R. Ryan	6th Brigade Brig. Gen. John Clark		Monroe
2nd Division Maj. Gen. S.V.R. Ryan	6th Brigade Brig. Gen. John Clark	Col. John H Lenox	Arkansas
2nd Division Maj. Gen. S.V.R. Ryan	6th Brigade Brig. Gen. John Clark	Col. Raybon Smith	Chicot
2nd Division Maj. Gen. S.V.R. Ryan	6th Brigade Brig. Gen. John Clark		Union

== An uneasy peace ==
The removal of all Indians from the state by 1835 caused some Arkansans to believe that there was no longer a real need for a state military force. Additionally, the rapid rise in population (from 18,273 in 1820 to 97,574 in 1840) and the construction of federal military installations in Arkansas also detracted from a reliance on the militia. Throughout the 1830s and 1840s the various governors tried to maintain the interest of the legislators and the citizens in the militia. In particular, they pointed out the continuing potential for conflict between the United States and Mexico. The uneasy relations with Mexico caused enough concern in Arkansas that the militia system continued to be maintained. A headline in the Arkansas Gazette in 1839 read "Military Fever sweeps Arkansas, companies of volunteers forming". Yet this "fever" apparently did not include the entire state because an editorial in the same paper, just a few months later bemoaned the fact that some counties had yet to organized their militia regiments. The number of counties with organized militia regiments grew steadily between 1836 and the beginning of the war with Mexico, and a few counties even had enough interest to organize a second regiment within the county. The Arkansas Gazette continued to report on the annual muster of the Pulaski county militia regiment and militia elections in the outlying counties. A few Volunteer Militia Companies remained active in the years leading up to the Mexican–American War.

=== Pike's Artillery ===
A young lawyer and newspaper editor by the name of Albert Pike organized a Volunteer Artillery Company in Pulaski County in September 1836. The First Artillery Company of Arkansas Militia, also known as Pike's Artillery, fired a 26 gun salute on the day of Governor Conway's Inauguration. The battery was trained as both artillery and infantry. The Arkansas Gazette would refer to the Pikes Artillery Company or the Little Rock Guards, as the unit was also known regularly in the years between 1836 and 1846. The battery was a regular at Fourth of July celebrations and other causes for military demonstrations in the early 1840s. William F. Pope, an early settler in Little Rock, recorded in his memoirs that Pike's forty-man artillery company sent a "special agent" to New York City to obtain the following uniforms:

A full set of black broad-cloth, the coat cut swallow tail and faced with red. The trousers were of the same material, with a wide gold braid down the outside seams. For headgear they had black beaver Shakos, with red pompoms. For summer wear, the uniform was a gray blouse, with red trimmings, with white duck trousers and gray fatigue caps.

On one particular occasion Pikes Artillery Company was reviewed by the Quarter Master General of the Army, Thomas S. Jesup, who complimented them on their appearance and precision of drill. Crawford County also maintained a Volunteer Infantry Company from 1844 to 1847. Pike would later serve in the Confederate Army and as a leader in Freemasonry; he would be the only Confederate leader honored with an outdoor statue in Washington, DC.

=== Indian removal ===
The removal of Indian Tribes from eastern states to the Indian Territory began under President Andrew Jackson in the 1830s continued in the 1840s. Tribal groups would be organized in their home area and would begin the journey up the Arkansas River, usually by steamer, as far as water conditions would allow and would then continue overland through the state until they reached Indian Territory. The job of escorting these bands of refugees along the "Trail of Tears" would often fall to the Arkansas Militia. Governor Conway signed a proclamation on 22 October 1836 which stated that there were numerous Indians "roving about the state.... without any fixed place of abode and committing depredations upon the property of the citizens contrary to the laws..." he ordered the Indians to leave and directed that "The Commandant of Regiments of the Militia in the several counties in the state and all subordinate officers are required to give their aid in carrying this order into effect." A similar proclamation was signed again on July 18, 1840.

==== Militia elections ====
Militia elections between the close of the Texas War of Independence and the outbreak of the Mexican–American War continued in accordance with the Militia Act as evidenced by the following 1840 general order from Major General Snead, commanding the 1st Division of the Arkansas Militia:

January 15, 1840

First Division Arkansas Militia

Division Orders

Order No. 1

Headquarters

Fayetteville, January 6, 1840

Whereas, it has been represented to me, that the office of Brigadier General of the Second Brigade, a First Division, of Arkansas Militia, has become vacated by the death of Brigadier General Robertson Childress; it is hereby ordered that an election to fill said vacancy, be held at the several places of holding elections within said brigade, on Tuesday, the 25th day of February next.

The counties composing the Brigade are Saline, Pulaski, White, Conway, Pope, and Johnson, and the election will be held at the court houses of the respective counties.

S.G. Sneed, Major General

First Division Arkansas Militia

=== Arkansas Militia Act of 1843 ===
By 1843, the rapid growth in the number of counties in the new state necessitated the addition of two new brigades. The Legislature responded with "An Act for the better organization of the Militia of this State". This new act, which had 50 sections, basically restated most of the 1837 law but added nine sections which dealt with the filling of vacancies among the officer corps. The act referred to counties which had not yet organized their militia and directed the sheriff of said counties to announce elections for the office of Colonel Commandant and required the sheriff to continue to announce elections until the office was filled. Colonels were given guidance on filling vacancies. The law expanded the number of musters or drills that were to be conducted to include one regimental muster, one battalion muster, and four company musters each year. Volunteer Companies of cavalry, artillery and riflemen were authorized and the act allowed for the formation of one regiment of cavalry in each brigade where four or more cavalry companies had been formed. The act provided for pay for a regimental adjutant and for the musicians at the regimental and company levels. A judge advocate was appointed for each regiment, and procedures for the conduct of courts martial and collection of fines were clarified. Emphasis was placed on reporting the attendance at company musters to enable the state to make its required return to the United States War department. In the same session, the legislature passed a separate act entitled "An act requiring the Adjutant General to report the strength of the Militia of this State" to the proper officer of the General Government. This act was apparently necessary because the state had failed to receive its authorized allowance of weapons from the federal government for a number of years, due to the fact that the state had failed to file the proper reports or "returns" with the War Department. A return from Arkansas was filed with the Secretary of War dated January 15, 1844, which reported the State of Arkansas as having a total of 17,137 militiamen. The 1844 return indicated that the state had three cavalry companies, and one rifle company but no organized artillery company. The regimental numbers were not listed in the Militia Act but were first developed by Governor Archibald Yell and announced by his Adjutant General, S.H. Hempstead, on January 1, 1841.

Division	Brigade	Regiment	Colonel	County
1st Division	1st Brigade	47th Regiment	Col.	Hot Spring
1st Division	1st Brigade	28th Regiment	Col.	Clark
1st Division	1st Brigade	38th Regiment	Col.	Pike
1st Division	1st Brigade	8th Regiment	Col.	Hempstead
1st Division	1st Brigade	40th Regiment	Col.	Lafayette
1st Division	1st Brigade	37th Regiment	Col.	Sevier
1st Division	1st Brigade	39th Regiment	Col.	Ouachita
1st Division	1st Brigade	57th Regiment	Col.	Montgomery
1st Division	2nd Brigade Brigadier General Richard C. Byrd	26th Regiment	Colonel Charles Fitch	Yell
1st Division	2nd Brigade Brigadier General Richard C. Byrd	18th Regiment	Colonel J.J. Joiner	Saline
1st Division	2nd Brigade Brigadier General Richard C. Byrd	13th Regiment	Colonel T.D. Metrich	Pulaski
1st Division	2nd Brigade Brigadier General Richard C. Byrd	21st Regiment	Colonel M.H. Blue	White
1st Division	2nd Brigade Brigadier General Richard C. Byrd	4th Regiment	Colonel B.H. Ball	Conway
1st Division	2nd Brigade Brigadier General Richard C. Byrd	15th Regiment	Colonel S. Moffit	Pope
1st Division	2nd Brigade Brigadier General Richard C. Byrd	36th Regiment	Colonel William Turner	Perry
1st Division	3rd Brigade	10th Regiment	Col.	Johnson
1st Division	3rd Brigade	17th Regiment	Col.	Scott
1st Division	3rd Brigade	5th Regiment	Col.	Crawford
1st Division	3rd Brigade	7th Regiment	Col.	Franklin
1st Division	4th Brigade	20th Regiment	Col.	Washington
1st Division	4th Brigade	2nd Regiment	Col.	Benton
1st Division	4th Brigade	11th Regiment	Col.	Madison
1st Division	4th Brigade	3rd Regiment	Col.	Carroll
2nd Division	5th Brigade	19th Regiment	Col.	St. Francis
2nd Division	5th Brigade	14th Regiment	Col.	Poinsett
2nd Division	5th Brigade	12th Regiment	Col.	Phillips
2nd Division	5th Brigade	30th Regiment	Col.	Crittenden
2nd Division	5th Brigade	48th Regiment	Col.	Mississippi
2nd Division	5th Brigade	35th Regiment	Col.	Monroe
2nd Division	6th Brigade	27th Regiment	Col.	Bradley
2nd Division	6th Brigade	24th Regiment	Col.	Jefferson
2nd Division	6th Brigade	1st Regiment	Col.	Arkansas
2nd Division	6th Brigade	23rd Regiment	Col.	Chicot
2nd Division	6th Brigade	29th Regiment	Col.	Union
2nd Division	6th Brigade	6th Regiment	Col.	Desha
2nd Division	7th Brigade	43rd Regiment	Col.	Fulton
2nd Division	7th Brigade	42nd Regiment	Col.	Izard
2nd Division	7th Brigade	22nd Regiment	Col.	Van Buren
2nd Division	7th Brigade	31st Regiment	Col.	Marion
2nd Division	7th Brigade	45th Regiment	Col.	Searcy
2nd Division	7th Brigade	41st Regiment	Col.	Newton
2nd Division	8th Brigade	9th Regiment	Col.	Independence
2nd Division	8th Brigade	34th Regiment	Col.	Jackson
2nd Division	8th Brigade	25th Regiment	Col.	Lawrence
2nd Division	8th Brigade	16th Regiment	Col.	Randolph
2nd Division	8th Brigade	33rd Regiment	Col.	Greene

Regimental Musters were apparently conducted and brigade commander's were active in inspecting their units as evidenced by this 1843 order from Brigadier General R.C. Byrd, commander of the 2nd Brigade of the Arkansas Militia:

BRIGADE ORDER, NO. 12

Headquarters

Little Rock, August 12, 1843

Notice is hereby given, to the commandants of the several regiments composing the second brigade of the first division Arkansas Militia, that they be reviewed in the following order, at their respective muster grounds:

The 15th regiment (Pope county), Col. S. Moffit, commandant, on Saturday, the 7th day of October next.

The 26th Regiment, (Yell county), Colonel Charles Fitch, commandant, on Thursday, the 12th day of October next.

The 4th regiment, (Conway county), Colonel B.H. Ball, commandant, on Saturday, the 14th day of October next.:

The 36th regiment, (Perry county), Col. Wm. Turner, commandant, on Thursday, the 19th day of October next.:

The 21st regiment, (White county), Colonel M.H. Blue, commandant, on Saturday, the 21st day of October next.

The 13th regiment, (Pulaski County,) Colonel T.D. Metrich, commandant, on Thursday, the 26th day of October next.

The 18th regiment, (Saline county), Colonel J.J. Joiner, commandant, on Saturday, the 28th day of October next.

R.C. Byrd, Brig. General

Of Second Brigade, Arkansas Militia

Times & Advocate copy, two weeks.

Regimental, Battalion and Company musters, parades and drills of the 13th Regiment from Pulaski County were regularly published in the local newspaper, between statehood until approximately 1848.

Militia Order

All persons liable to Military duty in the first Battalion, 13th Regiment, Arkansas Militia, are hereby ordered to attend a Battalion Muster, at the State House, in the City of Little Rock, on Saturday, the first day of April next, at 10 o'clock, A.M., Armed and equipped as the law directs.

Commandants of companies are also notified to hold company musters, at their respective muster grounds, on Saturday, the 25th of March inst.

E. Walters, Lt. Col.

Commanding 1st Battalion

13th Regiment, Arkansas Militia

Little Rock, March 14, 1843

== Mexican–American War ==
Flag presented by Ms. Josephine P. Buckner to Albert Pike's Little Rock Guards; inscribed with the words "Up Guards and at em."

In its early history the state of Arkansas maintained a keen interest in, and wary eye upon, Mexico. When Louisiana was purchased from France in 1803 the western boundary of the area was not well known. The Spanish, and then later the Mexicans after that country broke free of its mother country, were distrustful of the United States. America had always had a tendency to push westward, often spilling across even well-defined borders. The Spanish as early as 1816 sent a spy team into Arkansas to attempt to better plan its response to the movement of American settlers into the border regions.

After Mexico successfully declared its independence of Spain in 1822, the potential for conflict seemed to grow rather than subside. Many Americans settled in Texas, including a large number of Arkansans. The development of the Texas Revolution is closely linked to this state since many Arkansans joined Stephen F. Austin's colony in Texas. Also, Sam Houston spent much of his time in Washington, Arkansas, where he planned the revolution and gathered supporters. Additionally, many Arkansans volunteered for service in Houston's revolutionary army. Houston asked Arkansas volunteers to bring "a good rifle, and one hundred rounds of ammunition, and to come soon." On December 1, 1835, the Gazette editor reported that "emigrants and fighting men, in considerable numbers, are passing through town, almost daily..." With the successful conclusion of the Texas Revolution in 1836, a nine-year period of uneasy peace followed. However, in 1845 the expansionist United States Congress admitted Texas to the Union. War with Mexico followed immediately.

=== Call to arms ===
Upon the declaration of war in April 1846, Congress authorized the calling of 50,000 volunteers to augment the regular Army which, at the outbreak of the war, consisted of just 734 officers and 7,885 enlisted men. Although the war caused the army to be increased somewhat in size, the United States has always had a reluctance to maintain a large standing military, thus the call for volunteers. On May 15, 1846, Secretary of War W. L. Marcy wrote to Arkansas Governor Thomas S. Drew requesting one regiment of cavalry or mounted gunmen and one battalion of infantry. The cavalry was to proceed to Fort Smith where they would serve as replacements for regular forces being sent to the battlefront.

Federal law provided that to organize the volunteer units each governor was to direct his militia officers or the county sheriffs to assemble the local militia units and call for volunteers. The volunteers were then to march to the state rendezvous point and organize into units and be mustered into federal service. Only two existing volunteer companies, the Little Rock Guards under Captain Albert Pike and the Crawford County Avengers under Captain John S. Roane, could answer the call. Eight additional volunteer companies were raised through new enlistments.

=== Mobilization of volunteer forces ===
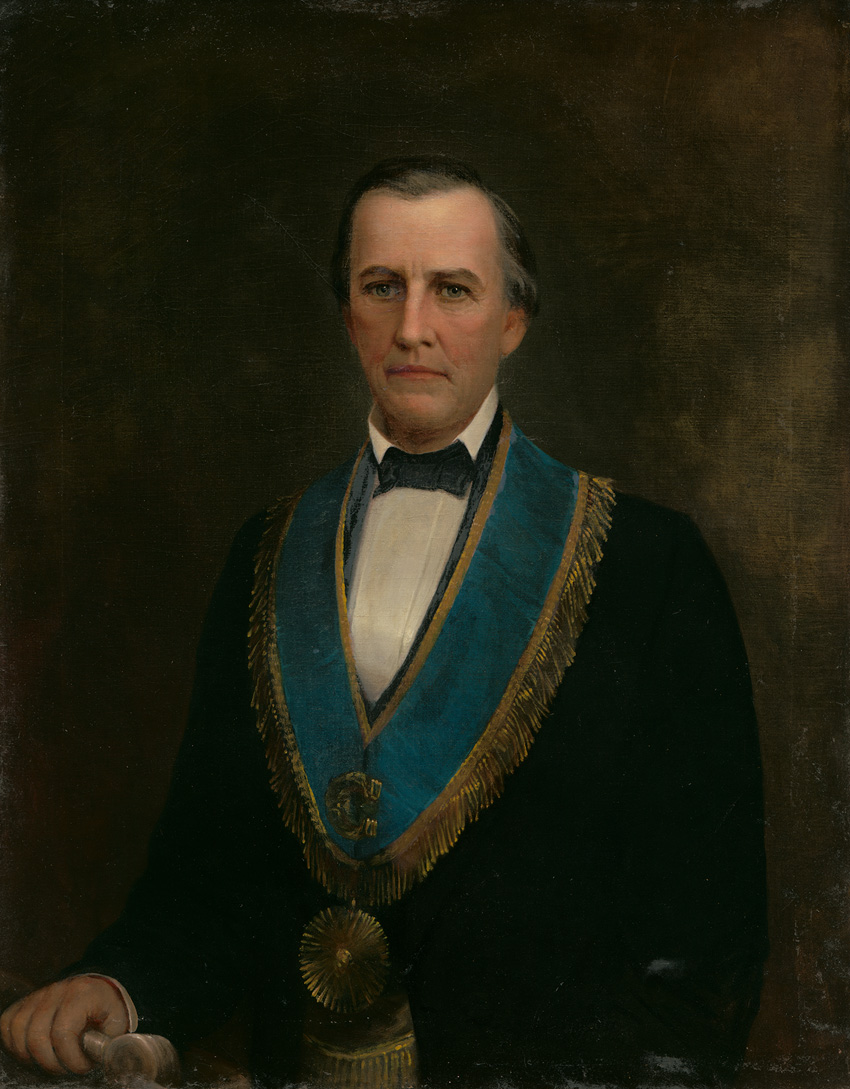
Archibald Yell, 2nd Governor of Arkansas, colonel, Arkansas Regiment of Mounted Volunteers, killed during the Battle of Buena Vista, February 23, 1847

On May 27, 1846, Governor Thomas Drew issued a proclamation calling for volunteers to fight in the Mexican War. The war drew volunteers from every strata of society, including two of the most famous Arkansans of the period, former governor Archibald Yell, who was serving in the U.S. House of Representatives, and Albert Pike, a prominent Little Rock lawyer. Yell left Washington and enlisted in Solon Borland's company in Little Rock as a private. Albert Pike was serving as the commander of the "Little Rock Guards" which answered the governor's call as a cavalry unit. Arkansas Militiamen were represented by George Morrison, who joined out of necessity. Morrison stated that he joined Pike's company because he had been out of work and needed the salary of $10 per month. After a round of speechmaking and picnics, a rendezvous was set at Washington in Hempstead County. Twenty-two companies of cavalry and seven companies for infantry answered the governor's call. From these militia units, two new commands were formed, the Arkansas Regiment of Mounted Volunteers, which would deploy to Mexico, and the Arkansas Battalion of Infantry and Mounted Rifles, which would serve along the western frontier, replacing federal troops being utilized in the war effort. By the middle of June 1846 the Arkansas troops were organized. Judging from the number of weapons drawn, the companies initially ranged in size from sixty to seventy-one men. By June 20 the Arkansas troops were marching to Washington, Arkansas, which was their designated rendezvous point. The sleepy little village of Washington was awash with activity as troops from all across the middle South stopped to rest and organize into larger units. When it came time to elect the regimental commanders, the Arkansas troops had a choice of two men: Albert Pike and Archibald Yell. Pike, a good militia commander and outstanding jurist, politician, and author, was a leader of the Whig Party in Arkansas. Pike, like the Whig Party in general, was opposed to the war in Mexico. Still, Pike took his militia responsibilities seriously and muted his criticism of the war. Pike's politics, combined with his aristocratic bearing and reputation as a stern disciplinarian, resulted in the election of Yell as colonel. A Democratic United States Congressman at the outbreak of the war, Archibald Yell resigned his seat to join the Arkansas troops. Although an influential politician, he had neither military training nor the willingness to learn. The election of Yell was to result in disaster for the Arkansas volunteers later in the war. Two other prominent Democrats, John S. Roane and Solon Borland, were elected lieutenant colonel and major, respectively.

=== The Arkansas Regiment of Mounted Volunteers ===
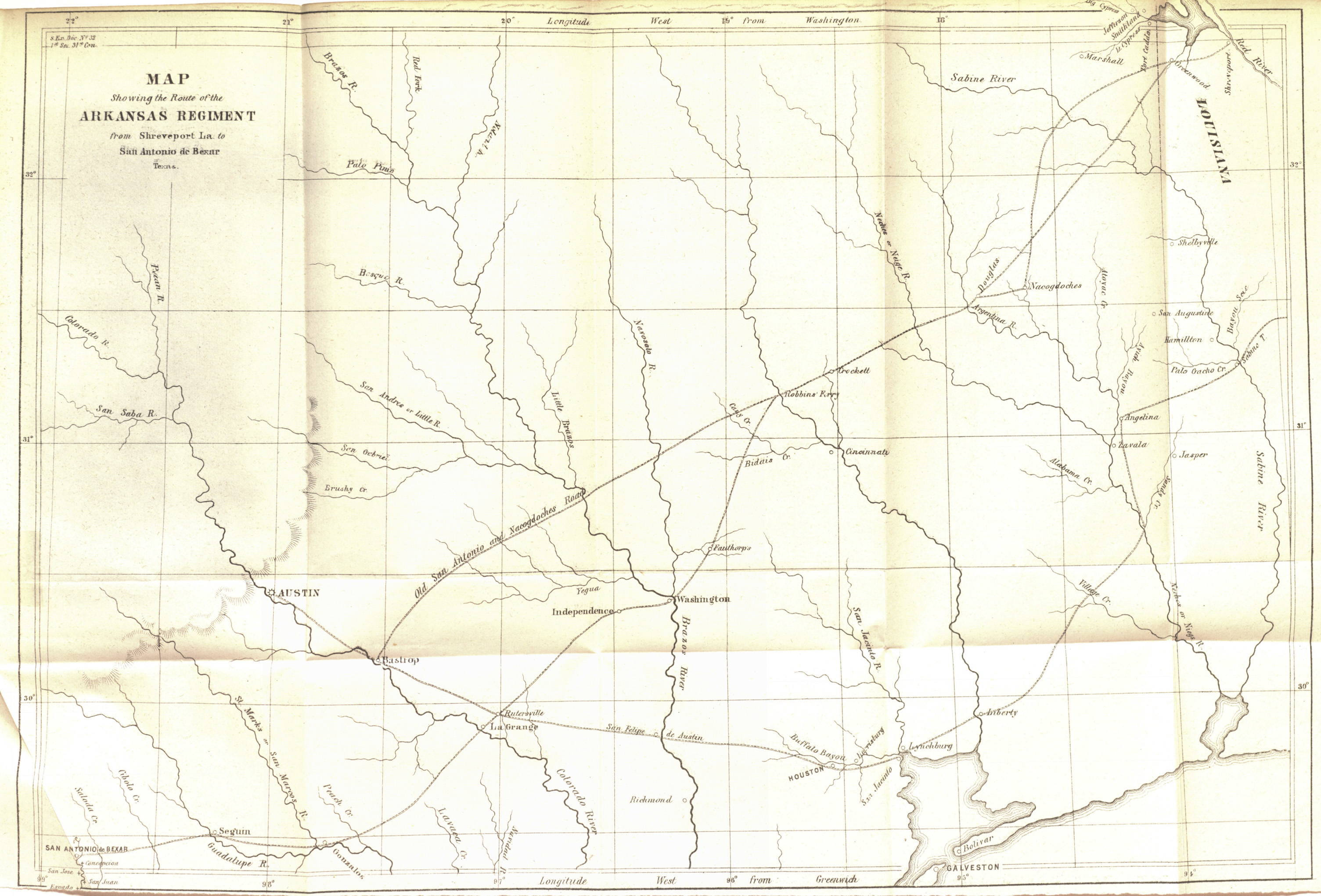
Map Showing the Route of the Arkansas Regiment from Shreveport La to San Antonio de Bexar, Texas, 1846-1850

The Arkansas Regiment of Mounted Volunteers was formed from troops from the following counties:

Company	County	Captain	Date mustered into federal service
A	Pope	James S. Moffett	July 1, 1846
B	Pulaski	Solon Borland	July 2, 1846
C	Johnson	George W. Patrick	June 30, 1846
D	Independence	Andrew R. Porter	July 3, 1846
E	Pulaski formerly the "Little Rock Guards"	Albert Pike	July 2, 1846
F	Crawford, the "Van Buren Avengers"	John S. Roane	June 29, 1846
G	Sevier	Edward Hunter	July 1, 1846
H	Franklin	William C. Preston	June 30, 1846
I	Hot Springs and Saline formerly the "Saline Rangers"	William English	July 1, 1846
J	Phillips	John Preston, Jr.	July 10, 1846

The Arkansas volunteers were mustered into the service of the United States on July 13. Five days later the regiment, 800 men and 40 wagons, set off on a march to San Antonio, Texas, by way of Shreveport, Louisiana. At San Antonio they reported to General John E. Wool, who was busy attempting to organize a campaign against Chihuahua Province, Mexico. Immediately upon making camp at San Antonio it became apparent that Colonel Yell was not up to his tasks as regimental commander. His organization of the camp was haphazard, necessitating General Wool to order its removal to a new location. Yell made no attempt to train the men, although Pike and Captain John Preston (commander of the Phillips County volunteers) drilled their companies. Pike complained bitterly about the ineptitude of Colonel Yell. He wrote back home to Little Rock that Yell "is the laughing stock of the men—for as yet he has never undertaken to give an order without making a blunder." Josiah Gregg, who accompanied the Arkansas troops as an interpreter and scout and who later gained fame as author of Commerce of the Prairies, found Yell to be a "clever, pleasant, sociable fellow, but decidedly out of his element" as a military commander.

=== Invasion of Mexico ===
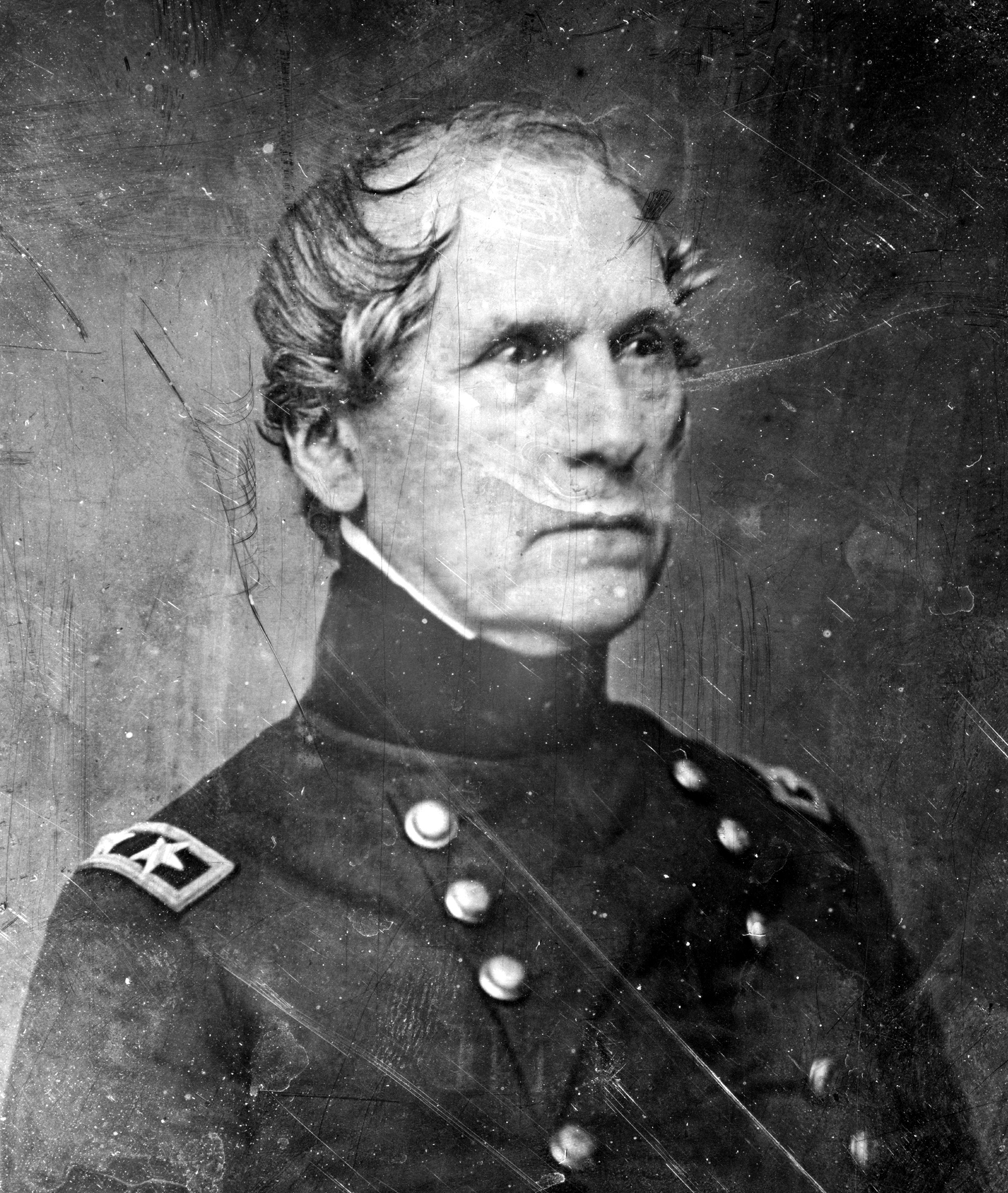
General John L. Wool's nicknaming the Arkansas troops the "Mounted Devils" was not intended as a sign of respect.

General Wool, despite the bickering among the "Mounted Devils" from Arkansas, set out for Mexico in mid-September 1846. Taking 1,950 men, he left four companies of the Arkansas regiment behind to bring additional supplies later. The expedition heard rumors that 7,500 Mexicans were massed at the Rio Grande to challenge the Americans, but this proved false, and General Wool crossed the border uncontested. Indeed, the first few months of the war found the troops fighting sickness more than Mexicans. While still in camp at San Antonio many members of the Arkansas regiment fell ill with dysentery and fevers. The first sizable town to be occupied by the Americans was Santa Rosa, whose 2,500 residents had no liking for the dictatorial government of President Santa Anna. The relatively well-trained companies of Captains Pike and Preston were separated from the remainder of the Arkansas regiment and formed into a squadron under Pike's command. That new unit was detailed to escort the engineers in reconnoitering the route to Santa Rosa. During the march to Santa Rosa, Lieutenant Colonel William S. Harney, an army regular who had been placed in command of some of the most ill-trained Arkansas volunteers, disgustedly asked to be transferred to his old regiment. On October 20, the Americans entered the city with "flags flying and sabres drawn", but no Mexican troops were to be found.

After remaining in Santa Rosa a week, General Wool marched his army toward Chihuahua through the town of Monclova. On November 3 the well-laid-out town of 8,000 was occupied, again without opposition. By this time the volunteers were growing impatient. For almost a month the troops languished, with little to do but drill and patrol the area. Gambling became a problem, which General Wool did his best to stop. When Wool ordered the men to grind meal from corn, the volunteers adamantly refused. Eventually the General came into direct confrontation with his officers. At one point he accused several Illinois officers of being "not worth a damn." On December 1 General Wool had all three regimental officers of the Arkansas volunteers placed under arrest for refusing to accept a designated campground.

Leaving a small garrison at Monclova, General Wool marched his troops toward the small town of Parras. After a wearying, twelve-day circuitous march across mountains and deserts the dusty Americans reached their objective. Suddenly, on December 17 at 2:00 p.m. General Wool received a note that Santa Anna was marching on the Americans at Saltillo. Within two hours, Wool had his forces on the march. By the twenty-first the troops were in Agua Nueva, and shortly reached Encantada where they learned the urgent note was false. In four days Wool's command had marched 120 miles, carrying along provisions for fifty-five days; 400,000 musket cartridges, and 400 rounds of artillery ammunition. The foot-weary troops settled down to a much needed rest.

Flag present by Ms. Julia Stewart to Captain John Selden Roane, for the Van Buren Avengers of Crawford County. The flag was a variation of the Stars and Stripes, with the words "Try Us" embroidered below the blue field.

The long marches and enforced drills did little to improve the discipline of the volunteers, especially the Arkansans. General Wool was continually chagrined by the excesses of the Arkansas troops. On January 4, 1847, the General had his adjutant write Colonel Yell a strong letter concerning depredations committed by the Arkansas regiment. The letter charged the Arkansas volunteers with plundering Mexican civilians, noting that the Arkansas regiment was the "worst offender in the force." The undisciplined men paid no attention to General Wool, instead they increased their outlawry from plundering to outright murder. On February 10, in reprisal for the killing of a drunken Arkansas soldier, about 100 members of the Arkansas regiment massacred a number of unarmed Mexican civilians. An investigation failed to determine the guilty men nor the number of persons murdered, although estimates ranged from four to thirty. General Wool ordered two Arkansas companies to the rear as punishment.

The Arkansas regiment was further embarrassed on January 23, when a detachment of five officers and sixty-six men under Major Borland was captured without firing a shot. The detachment had been out as a scouting patrol toward the settlement of Encarnacion. Although warned by General Wool "not to let the enemy get the advantage", Borland let his guard down when several days of observation failed to disclose enemy activity. On the evening of January 22 Borland's patrol bedded down without posting guards. As the sun rose the following morning, it reflected brightly from the lances of 500 Mexicans who surrounded the camp. Colonel Yell's subsequent reckless search for the captured Arkansans did nothing to redeem the reputation of his regiment.

The capture of the Arkansas patrol, as well as the growing number of small clashes, convinced the Americans that the Mexicans were preparing to mount a major offensive. Soon the Mexican camp at Encarnacion was spotted and General Zachary Taylor, overall commander of the campaign in northern Mexico, ordered a withdrawal to more defensible positions at Angostura. Colonel Yell's Arkansas horsemen were left to provide cover for the later evacuation of supplies. However, when Yell's forces came under attack after midnight on February 22, the untrained commander panicked, had his men burn the remaining stores, and fled. Although this action only served to further tarnish the reputation of the Arkansas regiment, it did serve the unintended purpose of misleading the Mexicans into expecting only a small American force.

=== The Battle of Buena Vista ===
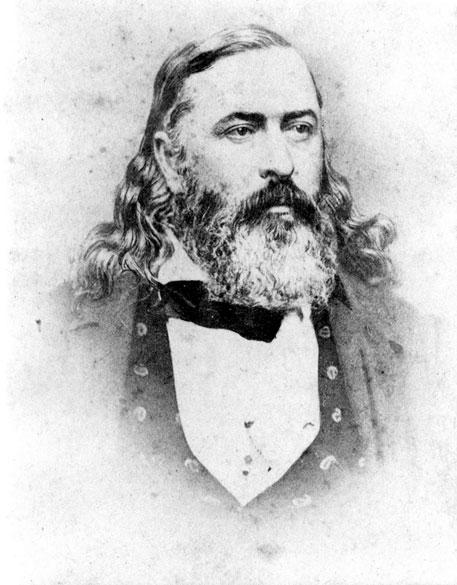
Albert Pike, captain, Little Rock Guards, Company E, Arkansas Regiment of Mounted Gunmen, later Brigadier General, Confederate States Army

The Mexicans, in actuality, greatly outnumbered the Americans. When the two opposing armies met on February 22, 1847, General Santa Anna had at his command almost four times the troops as General Taylor, 15,142 to 4,594. The Americans had the advantage, though, of selecting the battlefield. Stretching across a 2–3-mile (3.2–4.8 km) wide plateau, the battlefield was interrupted at several points by deep ravines. About 1 1/2 miles away to the north lay the sleepy little Hacienda San Juan de la Buena Vista, hence the battle which ensued became known as the Battle of Buena Vista.

Generals Taylor and Wool realized that they were badly outnumbered; therefore, they deployed their troops carefully. Artillery batteries were placed at strategic points. Dismounted rifle companies were placed so as to prevent flanking movements. Actual fighting did not start until about 3:30 p.m. when the Mexicans began moving forces toward higher ground. As the sun rose the following morning it became clear that Santa Anna had been busy during the night and planned a massive assault, relying on superior numbers to drive a wedge through the American defenses. As the battle began the Mexican troops moved with precision and fought bravely. Suddenly, Mexican cavalry aimed toward the American left intent upon pushing through and capturing General Wool's precious supply train camped at Hacienda Buena Vista. Among those standing before the red-shirted Mexican horsemen was the 2nd Indiana volunteers and farther back Colonel Yell's Arkansas cavalry, as well as Colonel Jefferson Davis' Mississippi volunteer riflemen. When the Mexican cavalry fell full force into the 2nd Indiana confusion reigned. Through misunderstood orders, a retreat began which soon became a stampede. The Arkansans, under Colonel Yell, awaited the Mexicans. When the moment of decision arrived, most of the Arkansas troops fled, leaving only their commander and a few brave privates. Yell, whose bravery could not compensate for his lack of military ability, died "facing the foe and trying to rally his men." Also dying on the field was Captain Andrew R. Palmer, commander of the Independence County company.

During the melee, General Taylor ordered reinforcements to bolster the left flank. Among those sent was Albert Pike's squadron as well as volunteer units from Mississippi and Illinois. Those forces redeemed the reputation of the volunteers by slowing and confusing the Mexican cavalry long enough for the American cannoneers to save the day. Although the Mexicans made one last foray, they were unable to break through. During the night Santa Anna quietly marched his army from the Buena Vista battlefield. General Wool showed his confidence in Pike by having him lead a mixed command of regulars and volunteers in a scouting of the Mexican retreat.

=== Demobilization ===
Upon the conclusion of the Battle of Buena Vista the war essentially was over for the Arkansas volunteers. On June 7, with their one-year enlistment nearly completed, the Arkansas troops were paid and mustered out of the service. Many of the Arkansans, eager to return home as quickly as possible, took passage on a steamer to New Orleans and then up the Mississippi and Arkansas Rivers to Little Rock. William F. Pope, who lived in Little Rock at the time, later wrote in his memoirs that one young man from Colonel Roane's forces was greeted by his father who said: "I hear you all fought like hell at Buena Vista". But the young veteran replied with a loud laugh: "We ran like hell at Buena Vista."

=== Arkansas Battalion of Infantry and Mounted Rifles ===
In addition to the regiment supplied for service in Mexico, the Secretary of War also called for the state to provide a battalion to replace U.S. Army units stationed along the frontier. The Arkansas Battalion of Infantry and Mounted Rifles consisted of five companies of men from Clarksville (Johnson County), Dover (Pope County), Fort Smith (Sebastian County), and Smithville (Lawrence County), totaling about 380 men. The Battalion was sent to Indian Territory to keep peace and allow U.S. forces there to enter the war. The Battalion occupied Fort Gibson and Fort Wayne in Indian Territory. This infantry battalion was under the command of Lieutenant Colonel William Gray and was formed from troops from the following areas:

Company	Location	Date Mustered into federal service	Date Mustered out of federal service/location
A	Clarksville	July 1, 1846	April 20, 1847, Fort Gibson, Indian Territory
B	Dover and Fort Smith	July 1, 1846	April 20, 1847, Fort Gibson, Indian Territory
C	Smithville, Lawrence County	June 30, 1846	April 20, 1847, Fort Gibson, Indian Territory
D	Fort Smith	July 18, 1846	April 15, 1847, Near Fort Smith
E	Dover	July 18, 1846	February 28, 1847, Fort Wayne, Creek Territory

=== Arkansas troops in the regular army ===
Late in 1846, the United States recruited ten regiments of regulars to launch a mission against Vera Cruz and inland to Mexico City. Captain Allen Wood of Carroll County raised a company of Arkansans for the Twelfth Infantry and joined the forces of General Winfield Scott in the summer of 1847. Wood's Arkansans fought in the battles of Contreras and Churubusco on August 19 and 20, 1847, on the outskirts of Mexico City. In a matter of weeks, Mexico City fell to Scott's forces. Shortly thereafter, the surviving Encarnacion prisoners were released. One other company was recruited, that of Captain Stephen Enyart, whose northwest Arkansas troops served at Meir, Mexico, guarding supply wagons.

== Aftermath ==
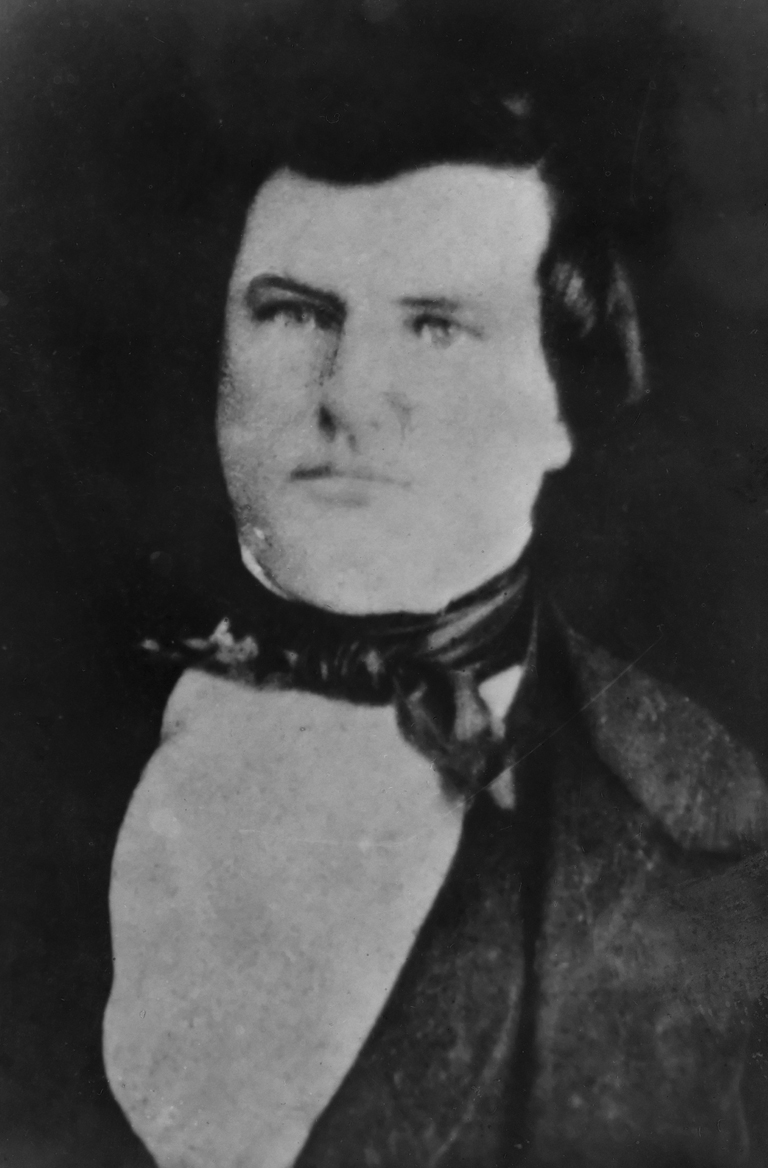
Lt. Col John S. Roane would later serve as the adjutant general and eventually Governor of Arkansas. He served as a Confederate general during the American Civil War.

Many Arkansans, especially Albert Pike, did not take lightly the poor record of the Arkansas volunteers. Pike, who was probably still smarting over his defeat for regimental commander, had criticized Colonel Yell long before the return to Little Rock. In a letter to the Arkansas Gazette on March 8, 1847, Pike severely reprimanded the Arkansas officers for not properly training and disciplining their men. He wrote: "Poor Yell! He atoned for his error with his life; but other brave men died with him, who were not in fault...."

Naturally, Colonel Roane and many of Yell's fervent supporters resented Pike's attitude. Roane and Captain Edward Hunter, commander of the Sevier County company, wrote letters to the Little Rock Banner soon after the Battle of Buena Vista charging that Pike's squadron had taken no part in the battle. Pike was furious and, upon his return to Little Rock took up the matter with Roane. A duel ensued, although neither man was injured.

Fourteen years after the Mexican–American War, both John S. Roane and Albert Pike would again find themselves leading troops in battle, this time as General Officers. The American Civil War was to produce a different type of record for Arkansas' militia and Volunteer Companies. With the end of hostilities, militia activity in Arkansas decreased. With the Mexican threat eliminated and the near-absence of a serious Indian threat, Arkansans saw little reason to maintain a state militia until the buildup of sectional tensions preceding the Civil War.

== Arkansas fallen soldiers – Mexican–American War ==
The following Arkansas soldiers became casualties during the Mexican–American War:

- Colonel Archibald Yell
- Captain Andrew Porter
- Corporal Darian Steward
- Corporal Pleasant Williams
- Corporal Richard Saunders
- Corporal Wilson Tomberlin
- Private Andrew Teague
- Private Clairborne Taylor
- Private David Hogan
- Private Franklin Brown
- Private George Martin
- Private Green Higgins
- Private Harman Winn
- Private Harrison Penter
- Private Jacob Ray
- Private John Milliner
- Private John Pelham, Jr.
- Private Thomas Rowland
- Private William Phipps
- Private William Robinson

== See also ==
- List of United States military and volunteer units in the Mexican–American War
