= USRC McLane (1845) =

Ship of the U.S. Revenue Cutter Service

History

United States
- Name: USRC McLane
- Namesake: Louis McLane
- Operator: U.S. Revenue Marine
- Awarded: 1 April 1843
- Builder: Cyrus Alger, Boston, Massachusetts
- Yard number: Steamer #1
- Launched: 1845
- Completed: 1845
- Commissioned: 1845
- Decommissioned: December 1847
- Fate: Sold 3 December 1847
- Notes: Converted to a light vessel at Merrill Shell Bank

General characteristics
- Class & type: Schooner
- Tonnage: 368 tons
- Length: 160 ft (49 m)
- Beam: 24 ft (7.3 m)
- Draft: 9.3 ft (2.8 m)
- Installed power: 2 high-pressure horizontal 24" diameter X 36" stroke steam engines
- Propulsion: sail, Hunter horizontal wheel later converted to side wheel
- Armament: 4 × 32-pounders

The United States Revenue Cutter McLane was one of 4 cutters out of 8 total cutters of the Legere–class iron steamers based on a design by U.S. Navy Lieutenant William Hunter. Hunter sought to eliminate the cumbersome and highly exposed side paddle wheels used on many of the steamers on the period by using wheels that were placed horizontally under the ship. Because of inefficiencies, the design used more coal and was subject to more mechanical failures than other designs. Before McLane was launched the Hunter wheel design was converted to side wheel configuration.

== History ==
On 2 January 1845, McLane was contracted to be built by Cyrus Alger of Boston, Massachusetts, and was launched and ready for sea trials on 29 November. Her first assignment came on 5 May 1846 where she was sent to New London, Connecticut. As hostilities with Mexico were becoming heated McLane was directed to return to Boston and prepare to get ready for war. War was declared with Mexico on 13 May 1846 and on 16 May the cutter was loaded with a full supply of ammunition and stores ordered to proceed to New Orleans, Louisiana. On 26 May, Captain William Howard reported to the Secretary of the Treasury that he was having problems recruiting a crew and could not sail as directed, however McLane did get underway on 27 May. On 5 July 1846 McLane entered the Mississippi river mouth and she arrived at New Orleans on 6 July to load troops bound for Port Isabel, Texas. On 12 July it was necessary for McLane to return to New Orleans to have her boilers repaired.

After having her boilers repaired, McLane was directed to go to Brazos Santiago Pass and arrived there on 21 August. On 26 August she received orders to blockade Mexican merchant shipping as far south as Tampico, Mexico, and sailed the same day. McLane joined the U.S Navy Home Squadron at Tampico on 30 August and was directed to blockade duty along the east coast of Mexico. McLane was tasked on 14 October to tow the gunboats USS Petrel, USS Nonata and USRC Forward across the bar on the Alvarado River. During the crossing she grounded on the bar and the tow lines became fouled. On 16 October she was part of a force commanded by Commodore David Conner that was directed to blockade the Tabasco River. After arriving on 23 October at the mouth of the river, McLane once again grounded on the bar. After gaining freedom from the bar, McLane and Forward were tasked with the blockade of the river at Frontera.

Orders for McLane to report New Orleans were sent from the Secretary of the Treasury on 16 December 1846 but because of delays in dispatches from headquarters in Washington, D.C., the orders were not received until 3 March 1847. A follow-up order was sent on 15 April. Captain Howard of McLane replied to the Treasury department order on 12 May stating that when the original order of 3 March arrived that McLane was the only vessel blockading the river at Frontera and that he felt that it was his responsibility to inform Commodore Conner that his orders were to leave for New Orleans and give Conner time to obtain a replacement vessel for blockade purposes. McLane departed Anton Lizardo on 4 June and arrived at Veracruz on 5 June. After receiving some Army dispatches, she departed bound for New Orleans. McLane arrived at New Orleans on 12 June and reported to the Director of Customs as ordered. The boiler and engine of McLane were removed from the ship and eventually sold at New Orleans for US$ 1,800. The hull was transformed into a floating light vessel situated at Merrill Shell Bank near New Orleans.
