= Edward W. B. Newby =

American soldier and military figure (1804–1870)

George Broke
- Born: George Robin Straton Broke; 1804; Virginia, U.S.
- Died: 1870 (aged 65–66)
- Military career
- Allegiance: USA
- Branch: Union Army
- Commands: 1st Regiment of Illinois Volunteers; 9th Military District
- Conflicts: Mexican–American War; American Indian Wars; American Civil War

Edward W. B. Newby (1804–1870) American soldier, a colonel of volunteers in the Mexican–American War, a captain of cavalry in the early campaigns of the American Indian Wars in the west and a major in the American Civil War.

Newby was born in Virginia. During the Mexican War Newby was elected captain of A Company, 1st Regiment of Illinois Volunteers, for during the war with Mexico, on May 22, 1847. He then was made colonel commanding the regiment, June 8, 1847. His regiment marched across the Great Plains from Fort Leavenworth to command the 9th Military District and garrison Santa Fe, New Mexico and later El Paso to keep order in the newly acquired lands that became New Mexico Territory. His command maintained detachments at various times at Taos, Abiquiu, Mora, Las Vegas, Galisteo, Albuquerque, Cebolleta, Tome, and Socorro until the war's end. Newby also authorized an expeditions against the Navajo by New Mexico Volunteers in April 1848. In May he led an expedition against the Navajo and made a treaty with them. He was mustered out at the end of the war on, October 16, 1848.

On March 3, 1855 he was made captain of Company H of the First Cavalry Regiment, the first in the U. S. Army. As such he served on the plains in Kansas and in New Mexico Territory. Newby served in 1856, on duty to keep order in Kansas Territory during the troubles in Bloody Kansas. He served in the 1857 Cheyenne Expedition and the Battle of Solomon Forks. He later served in the Kiowa and Comanche Campaign of 1860.

At the beginning of the American Civil War, Newby was transferred to the U. S. Fourth Cavalry Regiment, on August 3, 1861. On July 17, 1862 he was promoted major, Third Cavalry Regiment. He retired September 25, 1863, and died March 29, 1870.
