= USS Morris (1846b) =

United States Navy schooner

History

United States
- Name: USS Morris
- Namesake: Robert Morris (1734-1806), American politician and signer of the Declaration of Independence
- Acquired: October 1846
- Fate: Sold 1848
- Notes: Previously the Mexican schooner Laura Virginia

General characteristics
- Type: Schooner
- Propulsion: Sails

The fourth USS Morris was a schooner in the United States Navy in commission from 1846 to 1848. She was named for Robert Morris, a Founding Father, Continental Congressman, and major financier of the American Revolutionary War.

U.S. naval forces captured the Mexican schooner Laura Virginia in the Gulf of Mexico in October 1846 during the Mexican War. She was taken into the U.S. Navy and renamed Morris.

Morris was sold at the end of the Mexican War in 1848.
