= Rebeca Peralta =

Mexican politician

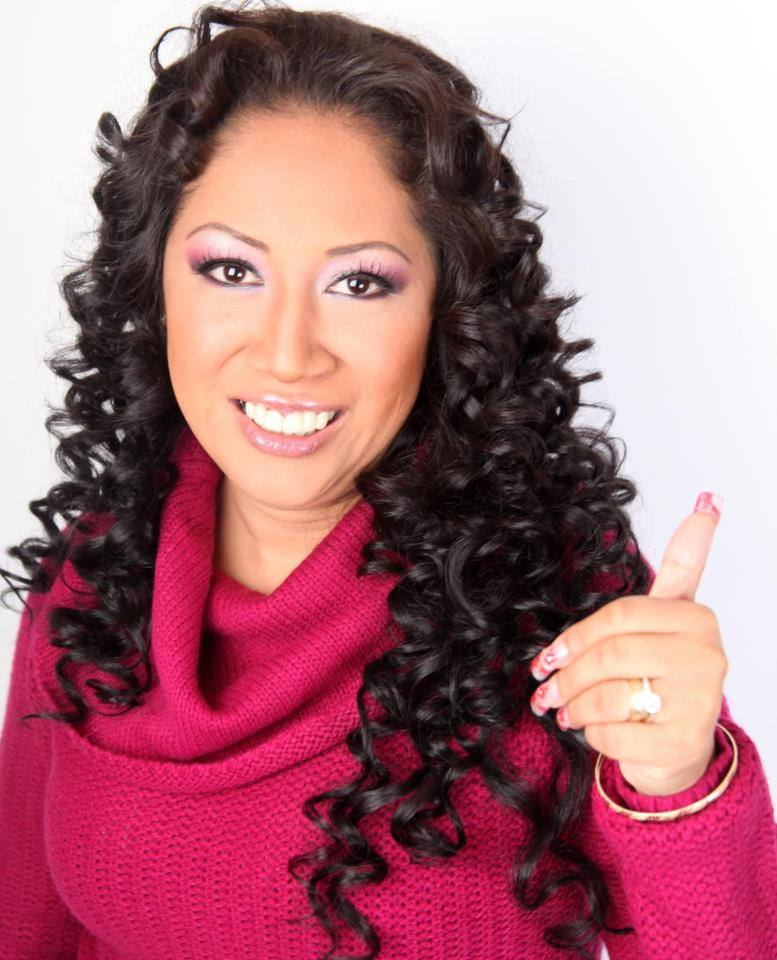

Rebeca Peralta León (born 7 November 1974), is a Mexican politician, member of the Party of the Democratic Revolution, was a deputy of Legislative Assembly of the Federal District from 2012 to 2015 and is a local deputy elected by the XXIV Local Electoral District of the Federal District.

Rebeca Peralta since 1995 has been a PRD counselor in the Federal District and from 2000 to 2002 was a national counselor, was also Secretary of Organization of the State PRD of the Federal District2, has been President of the Board of the PRD in the Federal District and Secretary of the Youth Movement in the PRD of Iztapalapa.
