= USS Spitfire (1846) =

Gunboat of the United States Navy

History

United States
- Name: USS Spitfire
- Acquired: by purchase, 14 July 1846
- Commissioned: 21 August 1846
- Fate: Sold, 1848

General characteristics
- Type: Gunboat
- Displacement: 241 long tons (245 t)
- Length: 119 ft (36 m)
- Beam: 22 ft 6 in (6.86 m)
- Depth: 9 ft 3 in (2.82 m)
- Propulsion: Steam engine

The fourth USS Spitfire was a sidewheel gunboat in the United States Navy during the Mexican–American War.

On 19 May 1846, only six days after President James Polk signed the Declaration of War with Mexico, Secretary of the Navy George Bancroft authorized the purchase of Spitfire and Vixen, two light draft steamers being built for the Mexican Navy. The ships were delivered to the United States Navy on 14 July 1846, and Spitfire was commissioned on 21 August 1846, Commander Josiah Tattnall III in command.

== Service history ==
After carrying dispatches for United States forces in California to Chagres, Panama, Spitfire joined the American blockading force off Vera Cruz on 10 November; and, as she was a new and efficient vessel designed specifically for service on Mexico's Gulf Coast, she significantly strengthened Commodore David Conner's squadron.

=== Occupation of Tampico ===
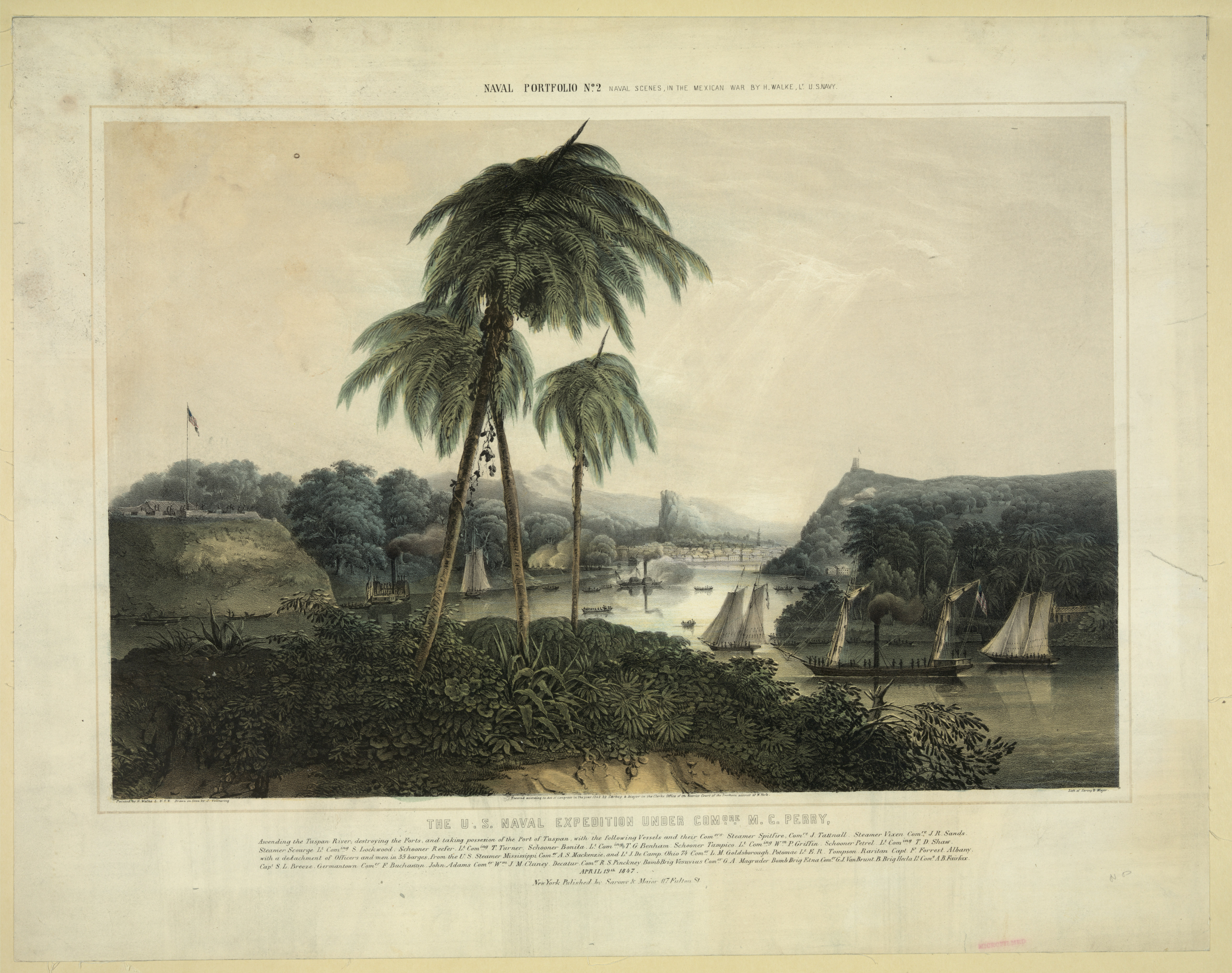
Spitfire amongst the U.S. naval expedition under Perry, ascending the Tuspan River; destroying the forts, and taking possession of the port of Tuspan

On the 12th, the small side wheel gunboat got underway with the squadron for an expedition against Tampico. The American ships gathered off Tampico bar on the morning of the 14th. At 10:45, Conner boarded Spitfire and used her as his flagship during the attack which they opened at about 11:00 by firing a gun.

Spitfire joined other light draft vessels of the squadron and boats from the heavier American warships in moving across the bar and up the Pánuco River and past the fort which guarded the stream. In the early afternoon, a delegation from the city boarded Spitfire to discuss surrender. No agreement was reached; but, after a landing party had occupied the town, Conner decided that no formal capitulation was necessary.

Two days later, boats from Spitfire and Vixen ascended the Panuco and captured three small Mexican gunboats. On the 18th, Spitfire and schooner Petrel went further up the river and captured the town of Pánuco the next morning. They also destroyed nine Mexican 18-pounders, threw a large supply of 18-pound shot in the river, and burned military stores before heading downstream on the 21st.

On 25 November, after a "norther" sank Neptune at Tampico, Spitfire rescued that steamer's crew without loss of life. On 13 December, Conner departed Tampico in Princeton and left Commander Tattnall in charge there until enough Army troops arrived to hold the town. Thus, Spitfire did not return to Vera Cruz until 3 January 1847.

=== Siege of Veracruz ===
Preparations were soon underway for operations against that important port city. On 9 March, Spitfire led a flotilla of gunboats and other light draft naval vessels close to the shore to support the landing of Army troops who began to invest the city.

Just after dawn the following day, Spitfire anchored east of the fortress at San Juan de Ulúa and opened fire on the castle to divert the attention of the Mexicans from General Winfield Scott who shifted his headquarters ashore that morning. After an engagement lasting about 30 minutes, Spitfire withdrew out of range of the Mexican cannon.

The days that followed were devoted to preparations for a siege of the city. At mid-afternoon on the 22nd, when the cannonading began, Spitfire led Josiah Tattnall III's flotilla in an attack on the shore end of the city walls and maintained the bombardment until dark. The steamer's fire was praised as being especially accurate and effective. During the action, the batteries in the fortress fired on the flotilla, but its ships were undamaged.

That night, Spitfire's executive officer, Lt. David Dixon Porter, made a daring boat reconnaissance of the harbor at Vera Cruz to locate the best position for the flotilla when it resumed its shelling.

The next morning, Tattnall sailed his gunboats within grape-shot range of Fort Santiago and opened fire on both the town and the fort. The Mexican guns replied but were unable to depress their pieces sufficiently to hit the fearless American gunboats.

=== Further operations ===
After the surrender of Vera Cruz, Spitfire participated in the expedition against Alvarado and the capture of Tuxpan as Commodore Matthew C. Perry's flagship.

On 14 June, she was part of the force which took Frontera at the mouth of the Tabasco River. The American ships then ascended the river, engaged Mexican batteries at three points on the Tabasco, and occupied the city of the same name on the 16th. The American warships remained until 22 July when they headed down river toward the Gulf of Mexico.

But, by this time most of the fighting of the Navy in the Gulf of Mexico had ceased. After routine duties protecting Army supply lines and communication, Spitfire returned home and was sold at Norfolk in 1848.

== See also ==
- Bibliography of early American naval history
