= USRC Wolcott (1831) =

- A Morris-Taney class Revenue Cutter

History

United States Revenue-Marine
- Namesake: Oliver Wolcott Jr.
- Builder: Webb and Allen, New York
- Commissioned: 1831
- Decommissioned: September 1846
- Home port: Newport, Rhode Island; New Haven, Connecticut; New London, Connecticut; Wilmington, Delaware
- Fate: Sold in 1851

General characteristics
- Class & type: Schooner
- Displacement: 112 tons
- Length: 73.4 ft (22.4 m)
- Beam: 20.6 ft (6.3 m)
- Draught: 9.7 ft (3.0 m)
- Propulsion: wind
- Complement: 20-24
- Armament: 6-9 pndrs

The United States Revenue Cutter Wolcott was one of 13 revenue cutters of the Morris-Taney Class to be launched. Named after Secretaries of the Treasury and Presidents of the United States, these cutters were the backbone of the United States Revenue-Marine for more than a decade. Samuel Humphreys designed these cutters for roles as diverse as fighting pirates, privateers, combating smugglers and operating with naval forces. He designed the vessels on a naval schooner concept. They had Baltimore Clipper lines. The vessels built by Webb and Allen, designed by Isaac Webb, resembled Humphreys' but had one less port.

Wolcott, named for Oliver Wolcott Jr., the second Secretary of the Treasury of the United States, served in Newport, Rhode Island; New Haven, Connecticut; New London, Connecticut; and Wilmington, Delaware. Ordered to Mobile, Alabama, in December 1844, she was driven ashore in Pensacola Bay on the coast of Florida during a storm. After repairs, she was attached to the United States Navy for service during the Mexican War to carry dispatches in the Gulf of Mexico. In September 1846, she was stricken from the commissioned list of the U.S. Revenue-Marine.

In June 1849, Wolcott was laid up in Mobile for repairs, and on 3 July 1849 she was transferred to the United States Coast Survey. The United States Government sold Wolcott at Mobile on 8 January 1851.
