= Joshua R. Sands =

American rear admiral (1795–1883)

Joshua Ratoon Sands
- Born: May 13, 1795; Brooklyn, New York, US
- Died: October 2, 1883 (aged 88); Baltimore, Maryland, US
- Burial place: Green-Wood Cemetery, Brooklyn, New York, US
- Military career
- Allegiance: United States
- Branch: United States Navy
- Service years: 1812–1872
- Rank: Rear Admiral
- Commands: Falmouth; Vixen; North Carolina; St. Lawrence; Susquehanna; Brazil Squadron
- Conflicts: War of 1812; Mexican–American War; American Civil War

Joshua Ratoon Sands (May 13, 1795 – October 2, 1883) was an officer in the United States Navy who rose to the rank of rear admiral. He served in the War of 1812, the Mexican–American War, and the Civil War.

== Early life ==
Sands was born in Brooklyn, New York in 1795, the son of Joshua Sands (1757–1835), who served as a U.S. Representative and Collector of the Port of New York. His mother, Ann Ayscough Sands (1761–1851), was the daughter of Richard Ayscough, a surgeon in the British Army. St. Ann's Church, the first Episcopal church in Brooklyn, was named in her honor.

== Career ==
Sands was preparing to enter Columbia College when the War of 1812 broke out. He entered the United States Navy as an acting midshipman in the Lake Ontario squadron under Commodore Isaac Chauncey. He was transferred to the Madison in April 1813 and took part in the capture of Toronto and Fort George. He then served on board the General Pike, the Superior, and the Washington in the Mediterranean from 1815 to 1818. He was commissioned as a lieutenant in 1818.

In 1819, Sands served on the Hornet off the coast of Africa and in the West Indies. From 1821 to 1824 he served on the Franklin along the Pacific coast, and from 1828 to 1830 on the Vandalia off the coast of Brazil. He was on recruiting duty from 1830 to 1840 and was promoted to the rank of commander in 1841.

As Commander, he was at the New York Navy Yard from 1841 to 1843, and then commanded the Falmouth in the Gulf of Mexico and the West Indies from 1843 to 1845. During the Mexican–American War, Sands commanded the Vixen. He was involved in the capture of Alvarado, Tabasco, and Laguna, briefly serving as Governor of Laguna. He also aided in the Siege of Veracruz and the capture of Tampico and Tuxpan in 1847. Sands received various commendations for his role in these engagements.

Sands commanded the North Carolina from 1849 to 1850 and the St. Lawrence in 1851, conveying exhibits to The Great Exhibition in London. He was promoted to captain in 1854, and then commanded the Susquehanna, joining the Mediterranean Squadron in 1856. He was involved with laying the transatlantic telegraph cable in 1857, as well as the engagement against the filibusters of William Walker in Nicaragua. He commanded the Brazil Squadron on the Congress from 1859 to 1861.

In 1861, Sands was transferred to the retired list, and he was promoted in retirement to commodore in 1862 and rear admiral in 1866. He continued active duty, serving as Union lighthouse inspector on Lakes Erie and Ontario and the Saint Lawrence River during the Civil War, and as port admiral at Norfolk, Virginia from 1869 to 1872.

== Personal life ==
Sands was first married in 1824 to Mary Stevens (1799–1825), daughter of the engineer and inventor John Stevens of Hoboken, New Jersey. They had one son before her death. In 1830, he married Mary's younger sister, Harriet Stevens (1801–1844). They had eight children together. In 1847, he married his third wife, Eleanor Ann Crook (1828–1882), in Baltimore. They had three children.

He died in Baltimore, Maryland in 1883 at the age of 88. At the time of his death he was a senior officer of the Navy on the retired list. He was buried at Green-Wood Cemetery in Brooklyn.
