= Frontera, Tabasco =

City in the Mexican state of Tabasco

Frontera
- Municipal Seat
- Location within Mexico
- Coordinates: 18°32′1″N 92°38′49″W
- Country: Mexico
- State: Tabasco
- Municipality: Centla
- Elevation: 1 m (3.3 ft)

Population
  - Total: 23,024
- Time zone: UTC-6 (Central Standard Time)

Frontera is a city and the municipal seat of Centla Municipality, Tabasco in Mexico.

In 2023, Frontera was designated a Pueblo Mágico by the Mexican government, recognizing its cultural and historical importance.

== Notable residents ==
- Alessa Flores (1988–2016), human rights activist.
