= African Slave Trade Patrol =

Part of the Blockade of Africa suppressing the Atlantic slave trade

- Part of the suppression of the Slave Trade
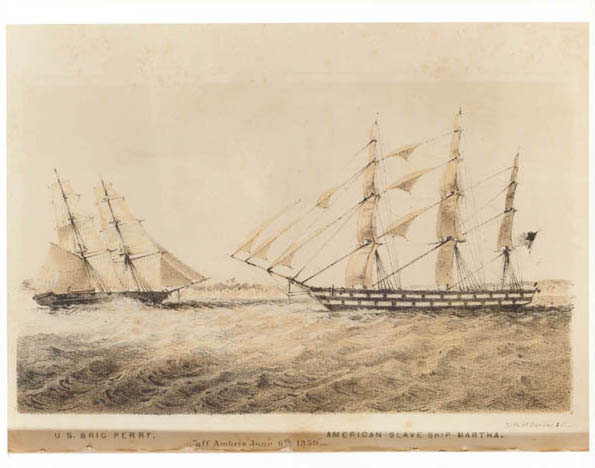
- USS Perry confronting the slaver Martha off Ambiz in 1850
Date	1819–1861
Location	Africa, Atlantic Ocean, Indian Ocean, Mediterranean Sea
Result	In 42 years about 100 suspected slave ships were captured

Belligerents
United States	African slave traders

Commanders and leaders
Matthew C. Perry; George W. Storer; William Compton Bolton; George H. Perkins; Andrew Hull Foote; Thomas Crabbe; Daniel Dobbins	Jozé Antonio de la Vega; Francis Bowen

The United States' African Slave Trade Patrol was part of the Blockade of Africa suppressing the Atlantic slave trade between 1819 and the beginning of the American Civil War in 1861. Due to the abolitionist movement in the United States, a squadron of U.S. Navy warships and cutters were assigned to catch slave traders in and around Africa. In 42 years about 100 suspected slave ships were captured.

== Operations ==
=== Origin ===
The first American squadron was sent to Africa in 1819, but after the ships were rotated out there was no constant American naval presence off Africa until the 1840s. In the two decades between, very few slave ships were captured as there were not enough United States Navy ships to patrol over 3,000 miles of African coastline, as well as the vast American coasts and the ocean in between. Also, the slavers knew that if they hoisted a Spanish or Portuguese flag they could easily escape pursuit. Congress made it difficult for the navy to keep a small force in Africa until 1842 when the Webster–Ashburton Treaty with the United Kingdom was signed. Commodore Matthew C. Perry was sent to command the Africa Squadron again after serving as the commander in 1821 aboard USS Shark.

Perry's arrival marked the beginning of America's growing effectiveness in the suppression, though the overall victories were insignificant compared to the Royal Navy's West Africa Squadron in the same period. The British captured hundreds of slave ships and fought several naval battles; their success was largely due to the superior size of their navy and supply bases located in Africa itself. The combined efforts of both the British and the United States successfully freed thousands of slaves but the trade continued on and the operation was expanded to the West Indies, Brazil and the Indian Ocean. The Brazil Squadron, the West Indies Squadron, the East India Squadron and the later Home Squadron were all responsible for capturing at least a few slavers each.

=== Revenue Cutter Service Patrols ===
On January 1, 1808, a law making the slave trade from Africa illegal went into effect. Revenue cutters were charged with enforcing this law. On June 29, 1820, the Dallas captured the 10-gun brig General Ramirez carrying 280 African slaves off St. Augustine, Florida. On March 25, the Alabama captured three slave ships. By 1865, revenue cutters had captured numerous slavers and freed nearly 500 slaves.

=== Capture of Spitfire ===
On June 13, 1844, the brig USS Truxtun was placed back in commission with Commander Henry Bruce in charge. Two weeks later, she sailed down the Delaware River and passed between the capes and into the Atlantic. After visiting Funchal, Madeira, the ship joined the African Station off Tenerife in the Canary Islands. For the next sixteen months, Truxtun patrolled off West Africa, visiting Monrovia, Liberia, and Sierra Leone, where slaves were freed. Truxtun also sailed to Maio islands of Santiago, and São Vicente. The Americans captured only one slaver on their cruise in 1845, the New Orleans schooner named Spitfire. The vessel was caught on the Rio Pongo in Guinea and was taken without incident. Though she was only about 100 tons, she carried 346 slaves. The Americans also discovered that she had landed 339 slaves near Matanzas, Cuba, the year before. Commander Bruce reported that "between her decks, where the slaves were packed, there was not room enough for a man to sit, unless inclining his head forward; their food was half a pint of rice per day, with one pint of water. No one can imagine the sufferings of slaves on their passage across, unless the conveyances in which they are taken are examined. A good hearty negroe costs but twenty dollars, or thereabouts, and brings from three to four hundred dollars in Cuba." The capture of Spitfire gave the American Navy the incentive to increase the strength of the Africa Squadron. The ship was also fitted out and used in anti-slavery operations. On October 30, 1845, Truxtun weighed anchor at Monrovia, and she headed west towards Gosport Navy Yard, which she reached on November 23. She was then decommissioned on November 28.

=== Capture of Ann D. Richardson and Independence ===
The brig USS Perry served in the South Atlantic with the Brazil Squadron beginning in 1847. Perry got under way from Philadelphia on May 16, 1847, with specific orders to patrol between Rio de Janeiro, Brazil, and Buenos Aires, Argentina. Lieutenant John A. Davis was informed that suspected slavers in the American barque Ann D. Richardson were bound for the coast of Africa under false papers. Perry then seized the ship off Rio de Janeiro on December 16. Two days later, she also seized the American brig Independence. Investigation proved that both ships had been engaged in the slave trade, and both were sent to New York City as prizes. The captain of Independence was outraged about his arrest and even petitioned Commodore George W. Storer, but to no avail. USS Perry returned to Norfolk on July 10, 1849, and was decommissioned there four days later. She later served in Africa again, but only for a short while, after which she sailed back to New York.

=== Capture of Martha ===
One of the Americans' more significant victories in the operation was the capture of the slave ship Martha. On June 6, 1850, Perry, under Lieutenant Davis, discovered the large rigged ship Martha off Ambriz while she was standing in to shore. Soon after, as Perry came within gun range, Lieutenant Davis and his men witnessed some of Martha's crew throwing a desk over the side while raising the American flag. The slavers apparently did not realize that the brig was a United States Navy vessel until an officer and a few enlisted men were dispatched, at which time they lowered the American ensign and raised a Brazilian flag. When the officer reached Martha's deck, the captain denied having any papers, so a boat was sent after the desk, which was still floating, and all the necessary evidence was recovered. After that the slave trader admitted to Davis that he was a United States citizen and his ship was equipped for blackbirding. A hidden deck was found below with a large amount of farina and beans, over 400 wooden spoons, and metal devices used to restrain slaves. It was also learned that the captain of Martha was expecting a shipment of 1,800 Africans when Perry appeared. Martha was sent with a prize crew to New York City where she was condemned. The slaver captain paid 3,000 dollars to escape prison.

=== Capture of Nightingale of Boston ===
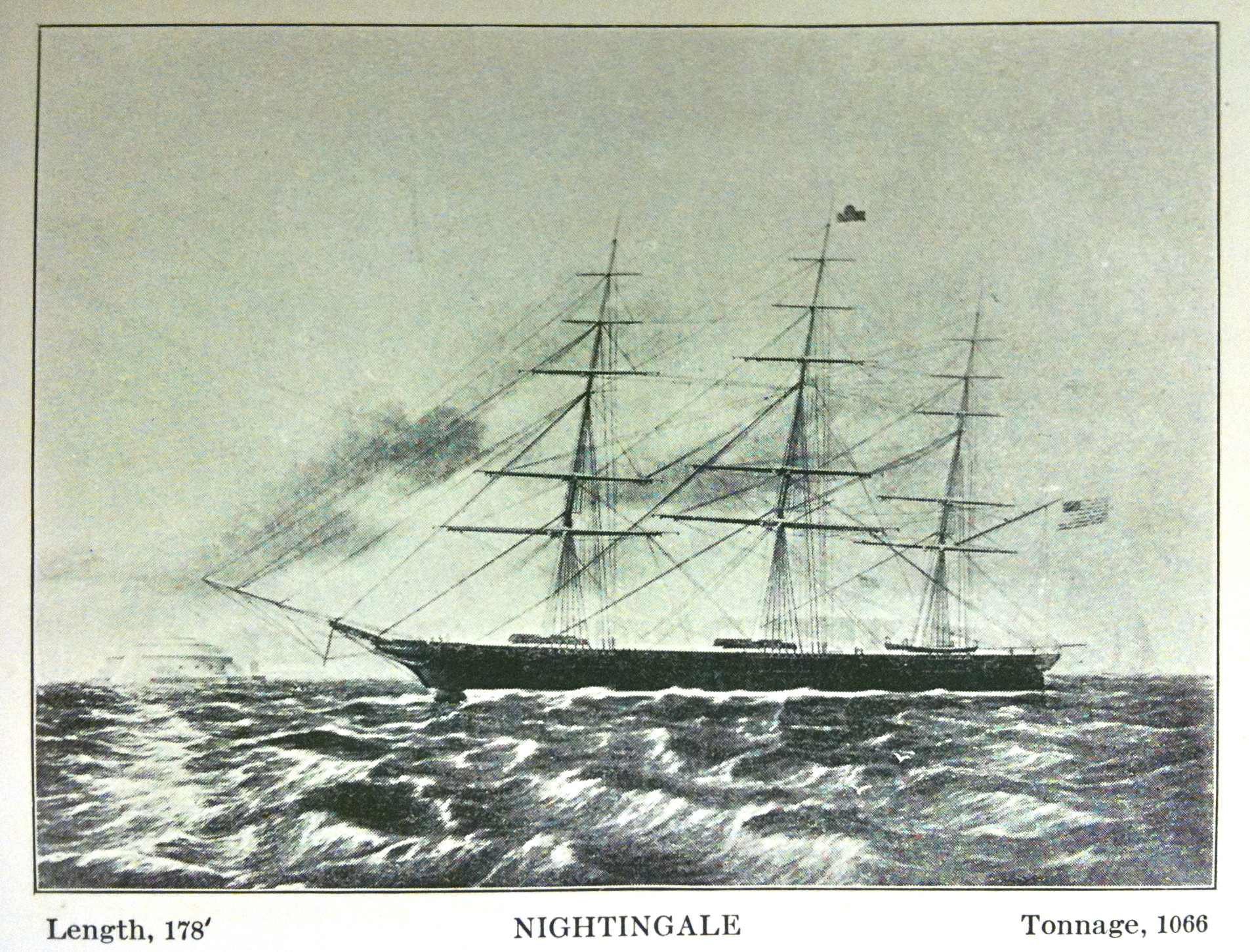
Nightingale, illustrated in 1913

The 1,066 ton clipper ship USS Nightingale originally sailed as part of the American merchant fleet as Nightengale of Boston in China, before trade in that region became unprofitable during the 1850s. She then became a known slave ship until being seized at St. Thomas on January 14, 1861, by the sloop-of-war USS Saratoga. Saratoga's Captain later described the slaver:

For some time the American ship Nightingale of Boston, Francis Bowen, master, has been watched on this coast under the suspicion of being engaged in the slave trade. Several times we have fallen in with her and although fully assured that she was about to engage in this illicit trade she has had the benefit of the doubt. A few days ago observing her at Kabenda, I came in and boarded her and was then induced to believe she was then preparing to receive slaves. Under this impression the ship was got under way and went some distance away but with the intention of returning under cover of the night; which was done and at 10 P.M. we anchored and sent two boats under Lieut. Guthrie to surprise her and it was found that she had 961 slaves on board and was expecting more. Lieut. Guthrie took possession of her as a prize and I have directed him to take her to New York. She is a clipper of 1,000 tons and has Nightingale of Boston on her stern and flies American colors.

The slaves were freed and landed at Monrovia in Liberia but not before 160 of them died from African fever aboard Saratoga. The sickness also spread to the crew. The captain, who was called the "Prince of Slavers", and his Spanish second mate escaped Nightingale while she was anchored off St. Thomas. Lieutenant John J. Guthrie, who was from North Carolina, then a slave state, was suspected of freeing the two and letting them escape justice. The clipper eventually served in the American Civil War as the storeship USS Nightingale in the Gulf Blockading Squadron. Ultimately, she was abandoned at sea in 1893, while under a Norwegian flag.

=== End of operations ===
The African Slave Patrol campaign streamer

United States Navy operations against the slave trade largely ceased in 1861 with the outbreak of the American Civil War. Navy vessels were recalled from all over the world and reassigned to the Union blockade of southern ports.

By the end of the Civil War, the African slave trade on the Atlantic had diminished further, though overland slave trading continued into the 1900s, primarily in North Africa and Central Africa. U.S. Navy officers who served in Africa between 1820 and 1861 received the "African Slave Patrol" campaign streamer.

== Vessels seized ==
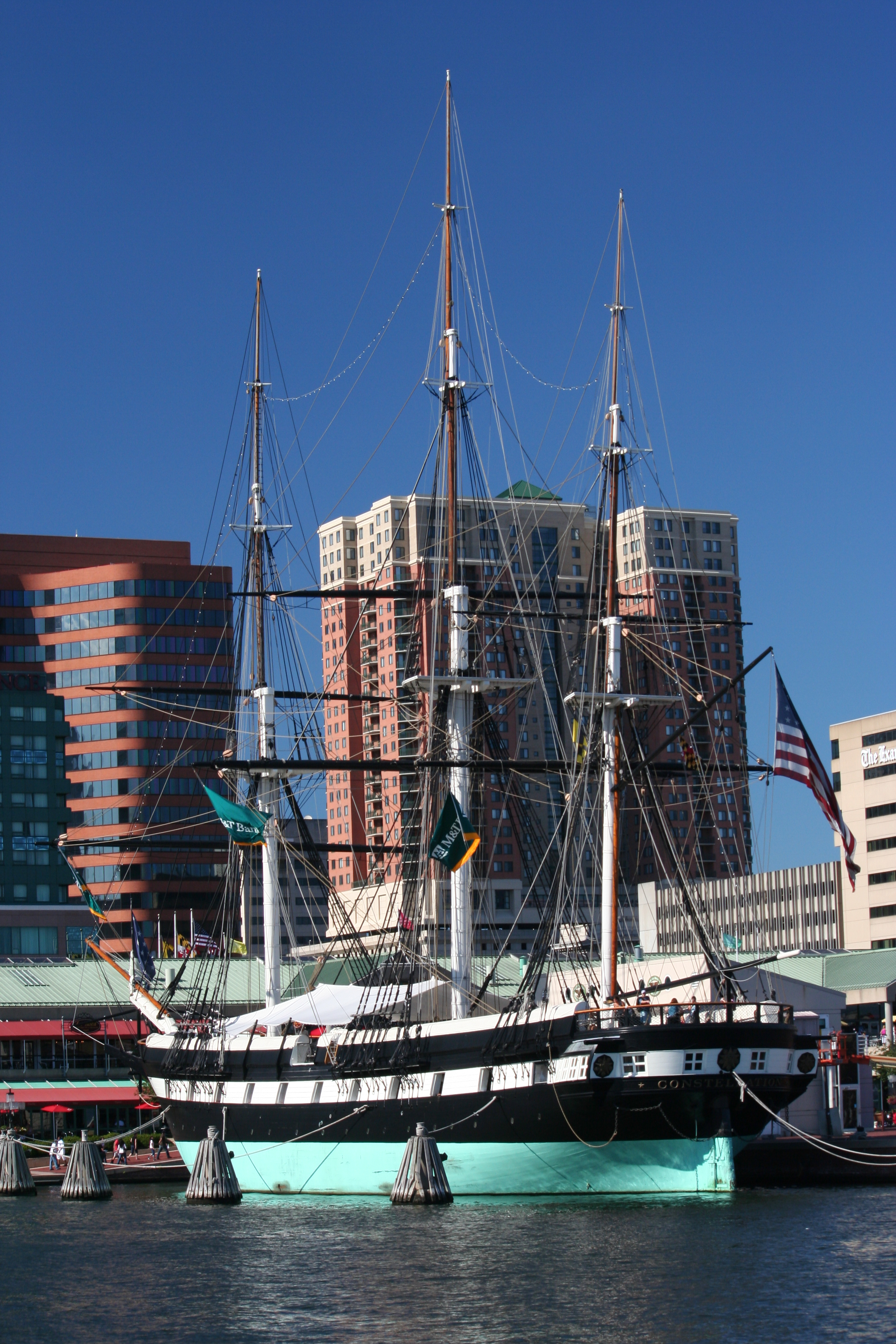
USS Constellation docked in Baltimore Harbor. Constellation captured three slave ships during her operations in Africa.

=== Africa Squadron ===
Vessel	Captor	Date	Location
Uncas	Porpoise	March 1, 1844	Gallinas
Spitfire	Truxtun	March 24, 1845	Pongas R.
Patuxent	Yorktown	September 27, 1845	Cape Mount
Pons	Yorktown	September 30, 1845	Kabenda
Merchant	Jamestown	December 3, 1845	Sierra Leone
Panther	Yorktown	December 15, 1845	Kabenda
Robert Wilson	Jamestown	January 15, 1846	Porto Praya
Malaga	Boxer	April 13, 1846	Kabenda
Casket	Marion	August 2, 1846	Kabenda
Chancellor	Dolphin	April 10, 1847	Cape Palmas
Excellent	John Adams	April 23, 1850	Ambriz
Martha	Perry	June 6, 1850	Ambriz
Chatsworth	Perry	September 11, 1850	Ambriz
Advance	Germantown	November 3, 1852	Porto Praya
R.P. Brown	Germantown	January 23, 1853	Porto Praya
H.N. Gambrill	Constitution	November 3, 1853	Kongo
Glamorgan	Perry	March 10, 1854	Kongo
W.G. Lewis	Dale	November 6, 1857	Kongo
Brothers	Marion	September 8, 1858	Mayumba
Julia Dean	Vincennes	December 28, 1858	Cape Coast Castle
Orion	Marion	April 21, 1859	Kongo
Ardennes	Marion	April 27, 1859	Kongo
Emily	Portsmouth	September 21, 1859	Loango
Delicia	Constellation	September 21, 1859	Kabenda
Virginian	Portsmouth	February 6, 1860	Kongo
Falmouth	Portsmouth	May 6, 1860	Porto Praya
Thomas Achorn	Mystic	June 29, 1860	Kabenda
Triton	Mystic	July 16, 1860	Loango
Erie	Mohican	August 8, 1860	Kongo
Storm King	San Jacinto	August 8, 1860	Kongo
Cora	Constellation	September 26, 1860	Kongo
Bonito	San Jacinto	October 10, 1860	Kongo
Express	Saratoga	February 25, 1861	Possibly Loango
Nightingale	Saratoga	April 21, 1861	Kabenda
Triton	Constellation	May 20, 1861	Kongo
Falmouth	Sumpter	June 14, 1862	Kongo

=== Brazil Squadron ===
Vessel	Captor	Date	Location
Porpoise	Raritan	January 23, 1845	Rio de Janeiro
Albert	Bainbridge	June 1845	Bahia
Laurens	Onkahye	January 23, 1848	Rio de Janeiro
A.D. Richardson	Perry	December 11, 1848	Rio de Janeiro
Independence	Perry	December 13, 1848	Rio de Janeiro
Susan	Perry	February 6, 1849	Rio de Janeiro

=== Home Squadron ===
Vessel	Captor	Date	Location
Putnam	Dolphin	August 21, 1858	Cuba
Cygnet	Mohawk	November 18, 1859	Cuba
Wildfire	Mohawk	April 26, 1860	Cuba
William	Wyandotte	May 9, 1860	Cuba
Bogota	Crusader	May 23, 1860	Cuba
W.R. Kibby	Crusader	July 23, 1860	Cuba
Joven Antonio	Crusader	August 14, 1860	Cuba
Toccoa	Mohawk	December 20, 1860	Havana
Mary J. Kimball	Mohawk	December 21, 1860	Havana

== See also ==
- Bering Sea Anti-Poaching Operations
- West Africa Squadron – British squadron active against slave trade
- Zanzibar slave trade
- Indian Ocean slave trade
- Red Sea slave trade
