= Enoch Greenleafe Parrott =

American naval officer

- Born: December 10, 1814; Portsmouth, New Hampshire
- Died: May 10, 1879 (aged 64); New York City
- Military career
- Allegiance: United States of America
- Branch: United States Navy
- Service years: 1831–1874
- Rank: Rear admiral
- Commands: USS Perry; USS Augusta; USS Canonicus; USS Monadnock
- Conflicts: Mexican-American War (1846–1848); American Civil War (1861–1865) • Battle of Port Royal (1861) • First Battle of Fort Fisher (1864) • Second Battle of Fort Fisher (1865)

Enoch Greenleafe Parrott (December 10, 1814 – May 10, 1879) was an American naval officer who fought in the Mexican-American War and Civil War, later rising to the rank of rear admiral.

== Biography ==
Parrott was born in Portsmouth, New Hampshire, on December 10, 1814. He entered the United States Navy in 1831 as a midshipman, and was promoted to lieutenant in 1841.

In 1843 he took part in the anti-slavery expedition of Commander Matthew C. Perry's Africa Squadron.

During the Mexican-American War he served aboard the 52-gun frigate USS Congress, and took part in John C. Frémont's expedition from Monterey to Los Angeles, and in the capture of Guaymas and Mazatlán.

Parrott was commissioned as commander in 1861 at the beginning of the Civil War, and was involved in the destruction of Norfolk Navy Yard before it could be taken over by the Confederacy.

In the brig USS Perry he captured the Confederate privateer Savannah, for which he received the commendation of the Navy Department. He commanded the steamer USS Augusta from 1861 to 1863, participating in the battle of Port Royal, and engaged the Confederate rams Palmetto State and Chicora at the time of their sortie from Charleston on January 31, 1863.

Parrot was in command of the monitor USS Canonicus of the North Atlantic squadron in the engagements with the ironclads on the James River in 1864, and in the fights with Howett's battery.

He commanded the USS Monadnock in the first attack on Fort Fisher in December 1864, and in the second attack in January 1865, and was present at the surrender of Charleston, South Carolina.

Parrott was promoted to captain in 1866, to commodore in 1870, and to rear admiral in 1873. He retired in 1874.

Parrott died in New York City on May 10, 1879, and is buried at St. John's church in Portsmouth, New Hampshire.

Military offices
Preceded by Thornton A. Jenkins	Commander, Asiatic Squadron; 12 December 1873–12 January 1874	Succeeded by Edmund Colhoun
