= USS Germantown (1846) =

Sloops-of-war of the United States Navy

History

United States Navy
- Name: USS Germantown
- Namesake: Germantown, Pennsylvania
- Builder: Philadelphia Navy Yard, Philadelphia, Pennsylvania
- Launched: 22 August 1846
- Sponsored by: Miss Lavinia Fanning Watson
- Commissioned: 9 March 1847
- Decommissioned: 25 February 1848
- Recommissioned: 8 April 1848
- Decommissioned: 21 September 1850
- Recommissioned: 23 December 1850
- Decommissioned: 9 April 1853
- Recommissioned: 23 November 1853
- Decommissioned: 12 February 1857
- Recommissioned: 15 July 1857
- Decommissioned: 18 April 1860
- Fate: Scuttled 20 April 1861; Captured by Confederates April 1861
- Acquired: Recaptured May 1862
- Fate: Raised, 22 April 1863; Sold, 8 February 1864

Confederate States Navy
- Name: CSS Germantown
- Namesake: Previous name retained
- Acquired: Captured April 1861; Refloated June 1861
- Fate: Scuttled 10 May 1862; Recaptured by U.S. Navy

General characteristics
- Type: Sloop-of-war
- Displacement: 939 long tons (954 t)
- Length: 150 ft (46 m)
- Beam: 36 ft (11 m)
- Draft: 16 ft 8 in (5.08 m)
- Propulsion: Sails
- Speed: 11 knots (20 km/h; 13 mph)
- Complement: 210 officers and enlisted
- Armament: 4 × 8 in (200 mm) guns; 18 × 32-pounder guns

USS Germantown was a United States Navy sloop-of-war in commission for various periods between 1847 and 1860. She saw service in the Mexican–American War in 1847–1848 and during peacetime operated in the Caribbean, in the Atlantic Ocean off Africa and South America, and in East Asia. Scuttled at the outbreak of the American Civil War in 1861, she was captured and refloated by the Confederate States of America and placed in service with the Confederate States Navy as the floating battery CSS Germantown before again being scuttled in 1862.

== Construction and commissioning ==
Germantown was launched at the Philadelphia Navy Yard in Philadelphia, Pennsylvania, on 22 August 1846, sponsored by Miss Lavinia Fanning Watson. Because of damaging ice at Philadelphia, she was transferred on 18 December 1846 to Norfolk Navy Yard in Portsmouth, Virginia, for fitting out. She was commissioned on 9 March 1847 with Commander Franklin Buchanan in command.

== Service history ==
=== Mexican–American War, 1847–1848 ===
Germantown departed Norfolk, Virginia, on 15 March 1847 for service during the Mexican–American War with Commodore Matthew C. Perry's Home Squadron. Reaching Sacrificios Island on 1 April 1847, she stood off Alvarado, Mexico, the following day when that town surrendered "without firing a gun," according to Perry. She then sailed with the squadron to Tuxpan, Mexico, which Perry described as the "only fortified place of importance situated on the gulf coast not in our possession." With the landing force of U.S. Navy sailors and United States Marines, Germantown′s detachment crossed the bar on 18 April 1847 and successfully stormed the Mexican fortifications. As "a point of honor as well as duty," they reclaimed guns and ordnance stores, seized by the Mexicans from the wrecked brig USS Truxtun.

After cruising the coast of Lobos Island, Germantown furnished 130 men to assist in the second expedition against Tabasco, Mexico. Between 13 and 16 June 1847, the force under Commodore Perry razed the defenses and occupied the town.

During the next six months Germantown cruised the Mexican coast from Veracruz to Tuxpan, blockading Mexican ports on the Gulf of Mexico coast; and between 9 August and 10 November 1847 she served as Commodore Perry's flagship. Returning to Sacrificios Island on 8 January 1848, she took on board the remains of American dead and departed for the United States on 15 January 1848. Steaming via Havana, Cuba, she arrived at Norfolk on 16 February 1848 and decommissioned there for repairs on 25 February 1848.

Germantown recommissioned on 8 April 1848 with Commander Charles Lowndes in command. Departing Norfolk on 25 April 1848, she returned to Veracruz on 19 May 1848 to again serve with Commodore Perry's Home Squadron. While off Laguna de Terminos on 3 June 1848, she received news of the ratification of the Treaty of Guadalupe Hidalgo, which brought the war to an end. She returned to Veracruz on 9 July 1848 and, after receiving government dispatches, she departed Punta de Antón Lizardo on 29 August 1848 and sailed to Pensacola, Florida, where she arrived on 12 September 1848.

=== Caribbean, 1848–1850 ===
Departing Pensacola on 1 October 1848, Germantown sailed to the West Indies and arrived on station at St. Thomas in the Virgin Islands on 28 October 1848. She actively cruised off the Virgin Islands until 30 June 1849, when she sailed for the United States. After touching at Key West, Florida, and Norfolk, she resumed her station off St. Thomas on 10 February 1850 and protected American commerce in the Caribbean until again ordered to the United States on 8 August 1850. She reached New York City on 11 September 1850 and decommissioned there on 21 September 1850.

=== African Squadron, 1851–1853 ===
Recommissioned on 23 December 1850 with Commander J. D. Knight in command, Germantown was assigned as flagship of Commodore Elie A. F. La Vallette′s African Squadron 10 January 1851. She departed on 12 April 1851, sailed via the Madeira Islands to the Cape Verde Islands, and arrived at Porto Praya on 14 May 1851 to relieve the sloop-of-war Plymouth. Operating out of Porto Praya with the sloops-of-war Dale and John Adams and the brigs Perry and Porpoise, she spent almost the next two years cruising the South Atlantic Ocean to St. Helena Island and along the African coast from Cape Mesurado to Loando, Portuguese West Africa. During this time the squadron "rendered aid to our countrymen, gave protection to our commerce, and security to the emigrants and missionaries located on the coast, and as far as practicable," reported Commodore La Vallette, "checked the slave traders in their abominable traffic." On 8 February 1853, Germantown seized the American schooner Rachel P. Brown and sent the suspected slave ship to Norfolk. Relieved on station by the frigate USS Constitution, she departed Porto Praya on 4 March 1853. During her homeward voyage, she collected data for Lieutenant Matthew F. Maury′s worldwide wind and current survey. She reached Boston, Massachusetts, on 30 March 1853, and decommissioned there on 9 April 1853.

=== Brazil Squadron, 1853–1857 ===
Germantown recommissioned on 23 November 1853 with Commander W. F. Lynch in command, and sailed on 3 December 1853 for service in Commodore W. D. Salter′s Brazil Squadron. Arriving at Rio de Janeiro, Brazil, on 16 January 1854, she joined the frigate Savannah, the brig Bainbridge, and the storeship Relief and cruised the South Atlantic from Bahia, Brazil, to Buenos Aires, Argentina. During much of 1855 she maintained station off Montevideo, Uruguay, where political disturbances and revolutionary activities threatened the lives and property of foreign nationals. Commander Lynch sent a United States Marine Corps detachment ashore on 28 August 1855 to protect American interests. During an insurrection three months later a landing party of sailors and Marines under Lieutenant A. S. Nicholson assisted forces from ships of three other countries in guarding consulates and the custom house. After completing duty with the Brazil Squadron, Germantown departed Bahia on 8 January 1857, reached Hampton Roads, Virginia, on 9 February 1857, and decommissioned there on 12 February 1857.

=== East India Squadron, 1857–1860 ===
Germantown again recommissioned on 15 July 1857 with Commander R. L. Page in command for duty in East Asia. Departing Norfolk on 4 August 1857, she sailed via the Cape of Good Hope to Ceylon, where on 22 December 1857 she joined Flag Officer Josiah Tattnall III's East India Squadron off Point de Gala. For two years she cruised East Asian waters and visited the principal ports of China and Japan, where she found "uniform friendly reception" as the squadron guarded American interests in East Asia. Sailing via the Cape of Good Hope, she returned to Norfolk in April 1860 and decommissioned there on 18 April 1860.

=== American Civil War, 1861–1864 ===
Out of commission but completely equipped for sea and awaiting a crew, Germantown was scuttled at Gosport Navy Yard in Norfolk on 20 April 1861 to prevent her capture by the Confederate States of America as the American Civil War began and Union forces evacuated Norfolk. The Confederates raised her in June 1861 and fitted her out as the Confederate States Navy floating battery CSS Germantown to serve near Craney Island for the protection of Norfolk. The Confederates filled her with sand and scuttled her as a blockship in the Elizabeth River shortly before evacuating Norfolk on 10 May 1862. Raised by Union forces on 22 April 1863, Germantown saw no further service. Her hulk was sold at auction at Norfolk on 8 February 1864.
