= Africa Squadron =

19th-century United States Navy unit

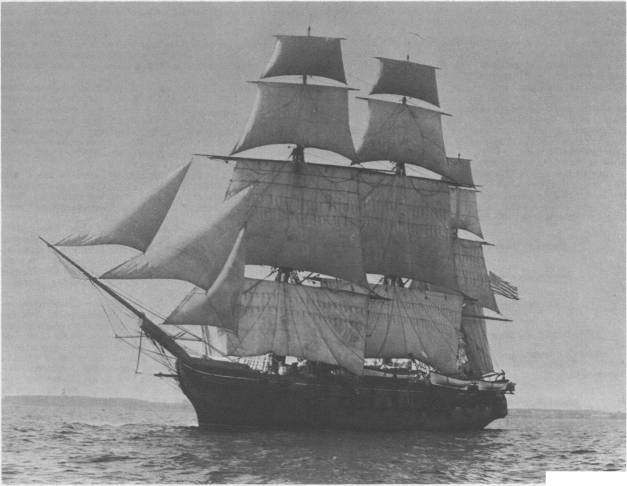
- A photograph of the sloop-of-war USS Jamestown (date unknown). She captured two slave ships with the Africa Squadron.
- Active: 1843–1861
- Country: United States of America
- Branch: United States Navy
- Type: Naval squadron
- Role: African Slave Trade Patrol

The Africa Squadron was a unit of the United States Navy that operated from 1843 to 1861 in the Blockade of Africa to suppress the slave trade along the coast of West Africa. However, the term was often ascribed generally to anti-slavery operations during the period leading up to the American Civil War.

The squadron was an outgrowth of the 1819 treaty between the United States and the United Kingdom that was an early step in stopping the trade, and further defined by the Webster–Ashburton Treaty of 1842. Although technically coordinated with a British West Africa Squadron based in Sierra Leone, in practice the American contingent worked on its own.

Matthew Perry was the first commander of the squadron, and based himself in Portuguese Cape Verde.

The squadron was generally ineffective, since the ships were too few, and since much of the trading activity had shifted to the Niger River delta area (present-day Nigeria), which was not being covered. In the two years of Perry's leadership, only one slaver was reported to have been captured, and that ship was later acquitted by a New Orleans court. In the 16 years of squadron operation, only the crews of 19 slave ships went to trial. These slavers were acquitted or only lightly fined. Other commanders, however, were more successful.

== African slave trade patrol ==
The Africa Squadron's cruising area eventually ranged from Cape Frio to the south (about 18 degrees south latitude), to Madeira in the north. However, the squadron's supply depot was in Cape Verde archipelago, approximately 2,500 nautical miles (4,600 kilometers) from the northernmost centers of the slave trade in the Bight of Biafra and southward. The navy department did not move the depot location until 1859, when it was set up at São Paulo de Luanda, in Portuguese Angola, about eight degrees south latitude. At the same time the department put Madeira out of bounds for the squadron.

The majority of the squadron's cruising in its first decade was along the coast of Western Africa, with particular attention to Liberian interests. By the 1850s much of the slave trade in this area had been eliminated by the British, based in their colony at Sierra Leone, as well as the Liberians.

This however, did not stop the board of directors of the American Colonization Society from writing the President of the United States to bolster the Africa Squadron's "fleet" in 1855 in accordance with the Webster-Ashburton treaty in an attempt to crack down on sailors and slavers use of sea-letters to claim American nationality in their attempt to further the slave trade on the African coast.

== Vessels seized by the Africa Squadron ==
Vessel	Captor	Date	Location
Uncas	Porpoise	1 March 1844	Gallinas
Spitfire	Truxtun	24 March 1845	Pongas R.
Patuxent	Yorktown	27 September 1845	Cape Mount
Pons	Yorktown	30 September 1845	Kabenda
Merchant	Jamestown	3 December 1845	Sierra Leone
Panther	Yorktown	15 December 1845	Kabenda
Robert Wilson	Jamestown	15 January 1846	Porto Praya
Malaga	Boxer	13 April 1846	Kabenda
Casket	Marion	2 August 1846	Kabenda
Chancellor	Dolphin	10 April 1847	Cape Palmas
Excellent	John Adams	23 April 1850	Ambriz
Martha	Perry	6 June 1850	Ambriz
Chatsworth	Perry	11 September 1850	Ambriz
Advance	Germantown	3 November 1852	Porto Praya
R.P. Brown	Germantown	23 January 1853	Porto Praya
H.N. Gambrill	Constitution	3 November 1853	Kongo
Glamorgan	Perry	10 March 1854	Kongo
W.G. Lewis	Dale	6 November 1857	Kongo
Brothers	Marion	8 September 1858	Mayumba
Julia Dean	Vincennes	28 December 1858	Cape Coast Castle
Orion	Marion	21 April 1859	Kongo
Ardennes	Marion	27 April 1859	Kongo
Emily	Portsmouth	21 September 1859	Loango
Delicia	Constellation	21 September 1859	Kabenda
Virginian	Portsmouth	6 February 1860	Kongo
Falmouth	Portsmouth	6 May 1860	Porto Praya
Thomas Achorn	Mystic	29 June 1860	Kabenda
Triton	Mystic	16 July 1860	Loango
Erie	Mohican	8 August 1860	Kongo
Storm King	San Jacinto	8 August 1860	Kongo
Cora	Constellation	26 September 1860	Kongo
Bonito	San Jacinto	10 October 1860	Kongo
Express	Saratoga	25 February 1861	Possibly Loango
Nightingale	Saratoga	21 April 1861	Kabenda
Triton	Constellation	20 May 1861	Kongo
Falmouth	Sumpter	14 June 1861	Kongo

Source: Canney, D. L., Africa Squadron, Potomac Books, 2006, pp. 233–234

== Commanders ==
- Commodore Matthew C. Perry 10 Mar 1843 - 29 Apr 1845
- Commodore Charles William Skinner 1 May 1845 – 6 Aug 1846
- Commodore George C. Read 27 May 1846 – 11 Oct 1847
- Commodore William C. Bolton 21 Oct 1847 - 22 Feb 1849
- Commodore Benjamin Cooper 22 Nov 1848 - 3 Sep 1849
- Commodore Francis H. Gregory 11 Oct 1849 – 25 Jun 1851
- Commodore Elie A. F. La Vallette 25 Jun 1851 – 23 Dec 1852
- Commodore Isaac Mayo 4 Jan 1853 – 17 Apr 1855
- Commodore Thomas A. Crabbe 17 Apr 1855 – 2 Jun 1857
- Commodore Thomas Conover 9 Jun 1857 - 31 Aug 1859
- Commodore William Inman 28 May 1859 - 12 Apr 1861

Source: Canney, Donald L., Africa Squadron: The U.S. Navy and the Slave Trade, 1842-1861

== See also ==
- Pacific Squadron
- Home Squadron
- West Indies Squadron
- Mediterranean Squadron
- Brazil Squadron
- North Atlantic Squadron
- East India Squadron
- Zanzibar slave trade
- Indian Ocean slave trade
- Red Sea slave trade

== Sources ==
- Richard Andrew Lobban Jr. and Peter Karibe Mendy, Historical Dictionary of the Republic of Guinea-Bissau, 3rd ed. (Scarecrow Press, 1997 ISBN 0-8108-3226-7) pp. 66–68
- Canney, Donald L. (2006). Africa Squadron: The U.S. Navy and the Slave Trade, 1842–1861. Washington, D.C.: Potomac. ISBN 9781597974646.
