= Johanna Expedition =

1851 American naval operation in the Indian Ocean

- Part of the African Slave Trade Patrol
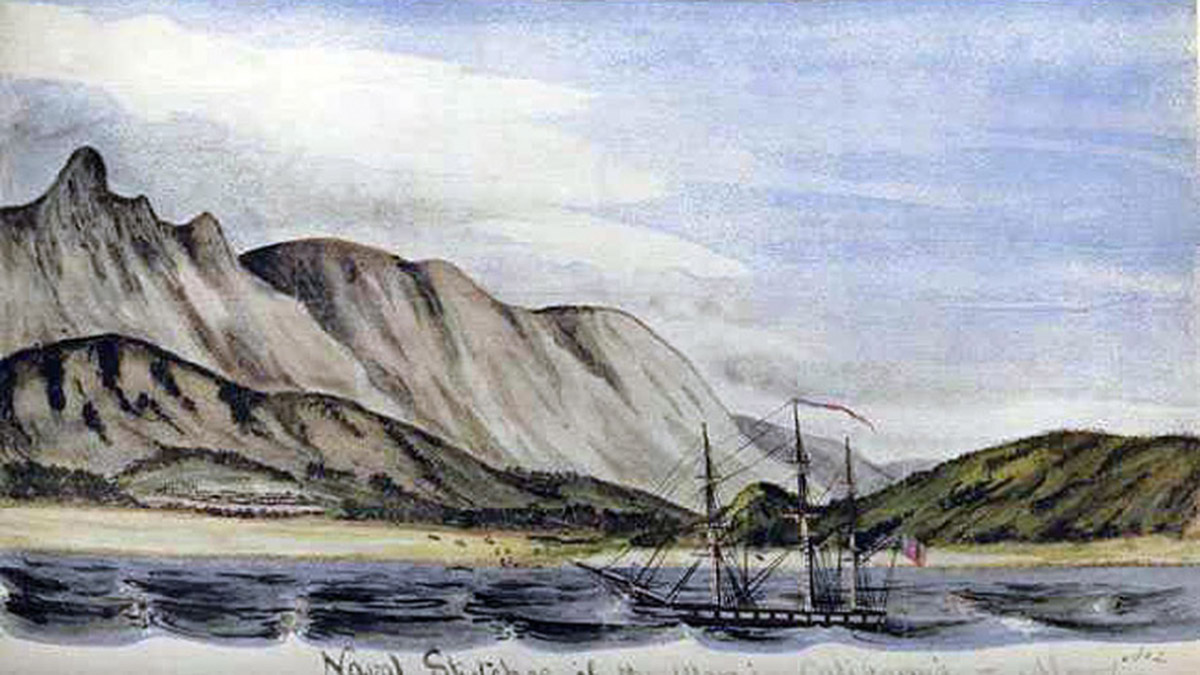
- USS Dale off San José del Cabo, Mexico in 1847, by William Henry Meyers.
Date	August 1851
Location	Matsamudu, Comoros Islands, Johanna Island, Indian Ocean
Result	American victory: Johannans surrendered the town, houses, slaves, cattle and money to the U.S.A.; Most Favored Nation Treaty signed

Belligerents
United States	(Anjouan) Johanna Sultanate

Commanders and leaders
(United States) William Pearson	(Anjouan) Selim

Strength
1 sloop-of-war U.S. Navy; U.S. Marines	1 fort 1 blockhouse

Casualties and losses
None	1 fort damaged 1 blockhouse damaged unknown loss of human life (civilian or military)

The Johanna Expedition, or Anjouan Expedition, was a naval operation that occurred in August 1851 during the American anti-slavery patrols off Africa. The event was unrelated to slavery and began after the seizure of the merchant ship Maria and her captain at Johanna Island in the Indian Ocean. The United States Navy sent a sloop-of-war to free the captain, who was still being held, and to demand compensation for the incident. When Sultan Selim refused, the Americans briefly bombarded the island's fortifications.

== Expedition ==
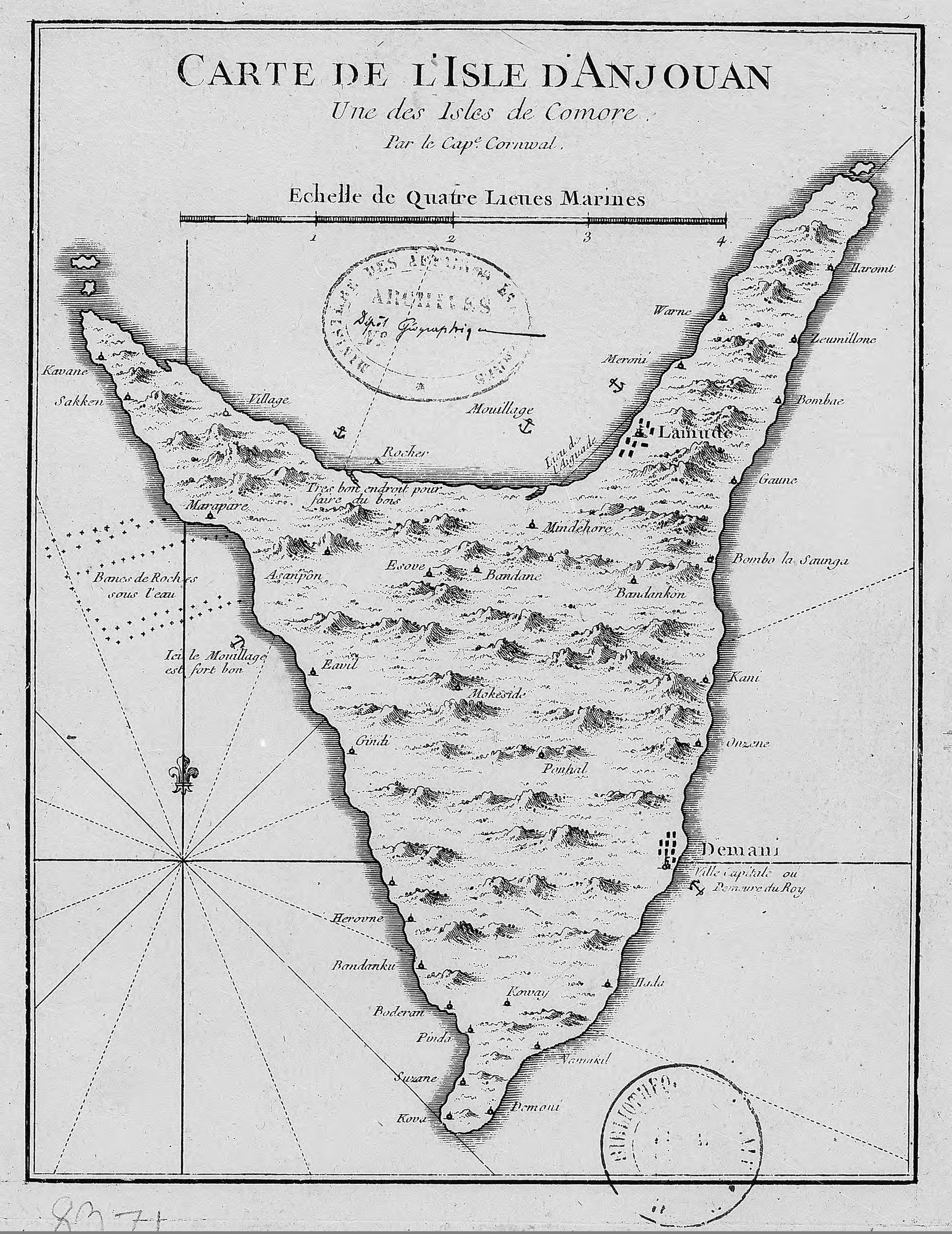
A vintage French map of Johanna which is also known as Anjouan.

In April 1850, the whaler named Maria, of New Bedford, Massachusetts, under a captain named Moores, was one of many American ships that used Johanna city as a port for resupplying before heading back out to sea. While doing so, the captain and his crew were seized by the Johannans and the ship was captured. When word reached American naval forces, conducting anti-slavery operations off Africa, Captain William Pearson, of the sixteen gun sloop USS Dale proceeded to Johanna. It was August 6, 1851 when the Dale arrived off of Matsamudu, the principal port. The place was defended by a fort at one side of town and a blockhouse on the other. First Captain Pearson warned the British naval forces and civilians in the area of his intentions and then he told the same to American merchantmen on Johanna. After this, Pearson demanded that the sultan release Moores and pay $20,000. This was impossible as the coffers on the island were nearly empty. The sultan had to disregard Captain Pearson's demand of so much money and first offered $500 in cash and another $500 worth of bullocks and trinkets. Captain Pearson refused and he moored his ship directly in front of the port, 100 yards from the beach, with eight guns facing the fortifications.

=== Bombardment of Johanna ===
The natives of the island became alarmed so Sultan Selim offered $5,000 in cash, cattle, trinkets and whatever he could find. Pearson never expected to receive the full $20,000 so he gave himself twenty-four hours to decide while the sultan gathered his resources. The Americans also warned the Johannans that if they did anything warlike, or failed to evacuate the women and children during the twenty-four-hour period, the deal would be void and the Dale would immediately begin a bombardment. However, the Johannans soon after revealed their intentions of ignoring the demands of Captain Pearson when they marched a large body of soldiers into the town. Consequently, at 9:00 am on August 6, 1851, USS Dale's 12- and 32-pound cannons fired on the enemy fort, which responded by firing six shots before a white flag was raised. USS Dale then stopped her attack and Selim issued another letter to the captain insisting that he very much wished that the bombardment would stop. Because Captain Pearson was not sure whether to resume the engagement, he sent Lieutenant Reginald Fairfax, in a launch with marines, to inquire about what the white flag was for and if they were ready to pay. When Fairfax reached the Johannans, he asked them about the flag and said that if it was not removed, the Dale would fire anyway.

The natives apparently refused to take the flag down so the Americans eventually resumed their fire on the fort before redirecting it at the blockhouse. Pearson ordered his men to make sure their shots were well aimed as he did not want any stray rounds to land within the civilian areas; only military structures were damaged. After expending a total of thirty-nine shot and shell from eight guns, over the course of about an hour, the Dale ceased firing again and sent Lieutenant Fairfax back to shore. Shortly thereafter, the lieutenant returned with Captain Moores and $1,000 from the sultan. Selim offered to surrender the town, give away all of his houses, slaves, cattle and money to try and stop the attack, he also said he was very sorry for the capture of the Maria and would not do anything like it again. Hoping to avoid bloodshed, Captain Pearson accepted the agreement and signed a treaty that put the United States among the island's most favored trading partners.

== Aftermath ==
The Americans suffered no casualties in the engagement and it is unknown if any of the Johannans were hurt. USS Dale and her crew successfully extracted redress for the imprisonment of Captain Moores. Captain Pearson remained off the island for a few more weeks, but no further fighting occurred. In late August, Pearson easily suppressed a mutiny aboard the American whaler Paulina off Johanna with his detachment of twenty-seven marines and some sailors. The mutineers were taken off the ship and placed in confinement. Captain Charles R. Cutler, master of the American bark Dolphin, was at Johanna at the time of the bombardment and later he submitted a detailed account of the engagement to the New York Times.

== See also ==
- Punitive expedition
- Falklands Expedition
- Korean Expedition
- Blockade of Africa
- East India Squadron
