= USS Chotauk =

American oil tanker (1920-1947)

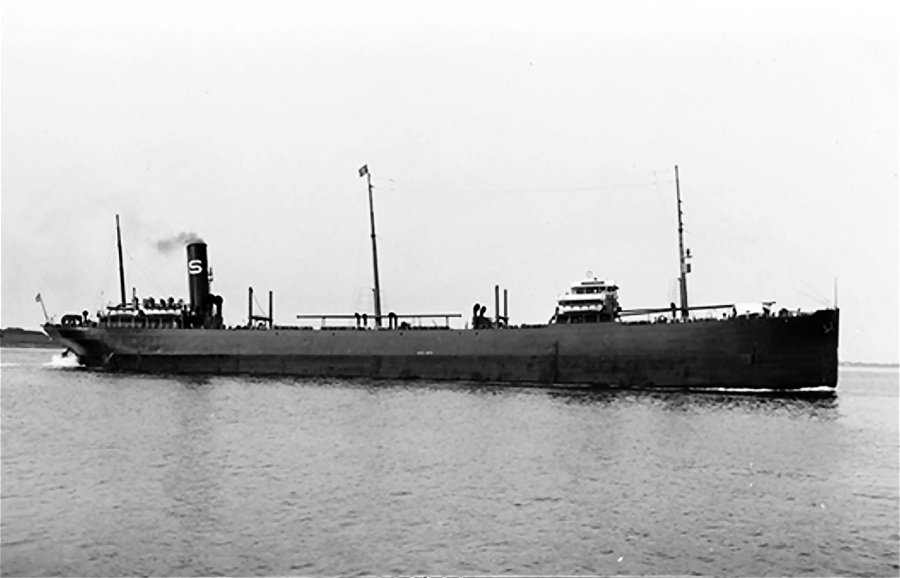
- Chotauk as Japan Arrow in 1929

History

United States
- Name: SS Japan Arrow (1920-1942); SS American Arrow (1942-1944); USS Chotauk (1944-1946); SS American Arrow (1946-1947)
- Namesake: Japan, United States, and USS Chotank
- Owner: Socony (1920-1942); War Shipping Administration (1942-1944); United States Government (1944-1946); War Shipping Administration (1946-1947); M. S. Kaplan Company (1947)
- Operator: Socony (1920-1942); War Shipping Administration (1942-1944); United States Navy (1944-1946); War Shipping Administration (1946-1947)
- Port of registry: New York, New York
- Builder: Bethlehem Shipbuilding Corporation
- Yard number: 1386
- Laid down: 1920
- Launched: 23 October 1920
- Commissioned: 24 November 1944
- Decommissioned: 7 February 1946
- In service: 1920-1946
- Identification: IX-188
- Honors and awards
- Fate: Broken up in New Orleans, May 1947

General characteristics
- Type: Arrow-class oil tanker
- Displacement: 18,925 tons
- Length: 485 ft (148 m)
- Beam: 62 ft 8 in (19.10 m)
- Draft: 28 ft (8.5 m)
- Speed: 11 knots
- Armament: one four-inch gun, one three-inch gun

USS Chotauk (IX-188) was an Arrow-class oil tanker. She served under the Socony-Vacuum Oil Company (previously the Standard Oil Company of New York) during the interwar period and then under the US Navy during World War II. The ship was originally named Japan Arrow, and was renamed to American Arrow after the American entry into the war.

== History ==
=== Construction ===
Japan Arrow's keel was laid down in 1920 as yard number 1386 at the Bethlehem Shipbuilding Corporation's Fore River Shipyard in Quincy, Massachusetts. She was launched on October 23 of that year, and entered service for Socony on November 24.

==== Specifications ====
The tanker had a length of 468.3 feet (142.7 m), a width of 62.7 feet (19.1 m), and was 8,327 gross register tons.

=== Socony service ===
Despite the Arrow class being designed for service in the Far East, the ship did not operate in that region until August 1925, when she departed the United States bound for India via the Suez Canal. Japan Arrow carried oil to nearly all of the countries in the Far East save for her namesake, Japan. Her only experience in the country was when she ran aground near Fuzhou, China, in April 1921 and was towed to Yokahama for both fuel and repairs.

She was transferred to the East Coast of the United States in 1930, carrying oil from Texas to New England save for one voyage in 1939. On that voyage, Japan Arrow carried a fractionating column from New Jersey to Beaumont, Texas, to be used in an oil refinery owned by Magnolia Petroleum Company. Cradles were welded to the side of the ship, and her port list was compensated for by extra ballast in the cargo tanks on Japan Arrow's starboard side.

In early 1942, Japan Arrow was renamed American Arrow to avoid any association with the country and its ideas. She was acquired by the War Shipping Administration in March 1942 and placed into war service, sailing from Abadan, Iran, to ports in South Africa, Australia, and India.

=== US Navy service ===
After ownership of American Arrow was given to the US government in September 1944, the tanker's name changed once more, this time to USS Chotauk. Chotauk was a typographical error; the ship was originally supposed to be named after the 1861 schooner Chotank. She was listed as a miscellaneous unclassified ship, and given the prefix IX.

Chotauk was transferred from the War Shipping Administration at Pearl Harbor on 29 November 1944, and commissioned the same day. She served as a station tanker with the Pacific Fleet for the last year of the war; first at Eniwetok from 3 January to 14 February 1945, then at Ulithi from 23 February to 10 July, and at Okinawa from 17 July to 29 October. The ship received three campaign medals—the American Campaign Medal, the Asiatic-Pacific Campaign Medal, and the World War II Victory Medal—for her service.

Chotauk returned to Mobile, Alabama, on 5 January 1946. She was decommissioned there and returned to the War Shipping Administration on 7 February 1946, where her name changed once more to American Arrow. The ship was later sold to the M. S. Kaplan Company for scrapping, and she was broken up at New Orleans in May 1947 by the Southern Shipwrecking Company.
