= Thomas Conover =

Thomas Anderson Conover
- Born: April 17, 1791; Middletown Point, Monmouth, New Jersey
- Died: September 25, 1864 (aged c70); South Amboy, New Jersey
- Military career
- Allegiance: United States
- Branch: United States Navy
- Rank: Commodore
- Unit: African Squadron
- Commands: USS Cumberland

Thomas Anderson Conover (April 17, 1791 - September 25, 1864) was a United States Navy officer born in New Jersey. He entered the Navy as a midshipman January 1, 1812 and during his fifty-three years of service to the Navy would serve aboard the Essex, Guerriere, John Adams and was Captain of the USS Cumberland during her service with the African Squadron. He was one of the first officers to be promoted to the rank of Commodore on July 16, 1862. Conover died on September 25, 1864.

== Dates of rank ==
- Midshipman on January 1, 1812
- Lieutenant on March 5, 1817
- Commander on February 28, 1838
- Captain on October 2, 1848
- Commodore on July 16, 1862 (Retired List)
