= H.N. Gambrill (ship) =

US merchant schooner

History

United States
- Name: H.N. Gambrill
- Fate: Captured 3 November 1853

General characteristics
- Type: Schooner
- Propulsion: Sails

H.N. Gambrill was a US merchant schooner involved in slave trade activities. The ship was captured on 3 November 1853 by USS Constitution during her mission in the African Squadron. H.N. Gambrill was Constitution's last prize.

== History ==
On 24 October 1853 the British warship HMS Crane encountered H.N. Gambrill off Cabinda. The British were suspicious and inspected the ship but released it later on. Crane later encountered USS Constitution and provided its commanding officer Commodore Isaac Mayo with information about H.N Gambrill. On 3 November Constitution also encountered the schooner about sixty miles (97 km) south of the Congo River and gave chase - eventually forcing H.N. Gambrill to a stop with a warning shot and capturing the ship. H.N. Gambrill's master tried to avoid the inspection by falsely raising the British flag and claimed that he was a legitimate trader working for Hatton and Cookson in Liverpool. Constitution's crew later found the ship to be outfitted for slave-transportation. Lieutenant DeCamp was ordered to take H.N. Gambrill back to New York, and to deliver the ship to the proper authorities.
