= David M. Buchanan =

- Born: January 28, 1862; Philadelphia, Pennsylvania, U.S.
- Died: May 25, 1936 (aged 74); Philadelphia, Pennsylvania, U.S.
- Burial place: Arlington Cemetery (Pennsylvania), Drexel Hill, Pennsylvania
- Military career
- Allegiance: United States of America
- Branch: United States Navy
- Service years: 1878–1883
- Rank: Apprentice
- Unit: USS Saratoga
- Awards: Medal of Honor

David M. Buchanan (January 28, 1862 – May 25, 1936) was a United States Navy sailor and a recipient of the United States military's highest decoration, the Medal of Honor.

== Biography ==
Buchanan joined the Navy from his birthplace of Philadelphia in October 1878, serving until the age of 21. By July 15, 1879, he was serving as an apprentice on the training ship USS Saratoga. On that day, while Saratoga was anchored off Battery Park in New York Harbor, Apprentice Robert Lee Robey fell overboard and was swept away by a strong tidal current. Without hesitation, Buchanan jumped into the water and went to Robey, who was not a strong swimmer. Another sailor, Apprentice John Hayden witnessed the event and, when it seemed that Buchanan needed assistance, he too jumped overboard and helped keep Robey afloat until all three men were picked up by the ship's boat. For this action, both Buchanan and Hayden were awarded the Medal of Honor a week later, on July 22.

Buchanan's official Medal of Honor citation reads:

On board the U.S.S. Saratoga off Battery, New York Harbor, 15 July 1879. On the morning of this date, Robert Lee Robey, apprentice, fell overboard from the after part of the ship into the tide which was running strong ebb at the time and, not being an expert swimmer, was in danger of drowning. Instantly springing over the rail after him, Buchanan never hesitated for an instant to remove even a portion of his clothing. Both men were picked up by the ship's boat following this act of heroism.

== See also ==
- List of Medal of Honor recipients during peacetime
