= John Hayden (Medal of Honor) =

U.S. Navy sailor and Medal of Honor recipient

- Born: 1863; Washington, D.C.
- Died: February 26, 1934 (aged 70–71); San Francisco, California
- Burial place: San Francisco National Cemetery
- Military career
- Allegiance: United States of America
- Branch: United States Navy
- Rank: Apprentice
- Unit: USS Saratoga
- Awards: Medal of Honor

John Hayden (1863 – February 26, 1934) was a United States Navy sailor and a recipient of the United States military’s highest decoration, the Medal of Honor.

== Biography ==
Born in 1863 in Washington, D.C., Hayden joined the Navy from that city. By July 15, 1879, he was serving as an apprentice on the training ship USS Saratoga. On that day, while Saratoga was anchored off Battery Park in New York Harbor, Apprentice Robert Lee Robey fell overboard and was swept away by a strong tidal current. Without hesitation, Apprentice David M. Buchanan leaped into the water and swam to assist Robey, who was not a strong swimmer.

Seeing that Buchanan might also need help, Hayden stripped off his clothing, dove overboard, and joined them in the water. Together, Hayden and Buchanan kept Robey afloat until all three men were rescued by the ship’s boat. For their bravery, both Hayden and Buchanan were awarded the Medal of Honor a week later, on July 22, 1879.

Hayden’s official Medal of Honor citation reads:

On board the U.S. Training Ship Saratoga. On the morning of 15 July 1879, while the Saratoga was anchored off the Battery, in New York Harbor, R. L. Robey, apprentice, fell overboard. As the tide was running strong ebb, the man, not being an expert swimmer, was in danger of drowning. David M. Buchanan, apprentice, instantly, without removing any of his clothing, jumped after him. Stripping himself, Hayden stood coolly watching the two in the water, and when he thought his services were required, made a dive from the rail and came up alongside them and rendered assistance until all three were picked up by a boat from the ship.

== See also ==
- List of Medal of Honor recipients in non-combat incidents
