= Edward Weston Carpender =

- Born: c. 1796; New York, US
- Died: May 16, 1877; Shrewsbury Township, New Jersey, US
- Burial place: Christ Church, Shrewsbury, New Jersey, US
- Military career
- Branch: United States Navy
- Service years: 1813–1865
- Rank: Commodore

Edward Weston Carpender (c. 1796 – May 16, 1877) was a United States Navy officer who served in three wars. At age 17, he was commissioned a midshipman on 10 July 1813 during the War of 1812, was promoted to commander on 8 September 1841 and served in the Mexican-American War, and was promoted to commodore and served in the American Civil War.

== Military career ==
On January 13, 1825, Carpender was promoted to the rank of lieutenant. In 1827 he was attached to the United States Navy Mediterranean Squadron. From 1829 to 1830 he served as an officer aboard the sloop-of-war USS Falmouth of the West India Squadron. From 1833 to 1834 he was attached to the Naval Rendezvous at Boston. In 1840 he served with the Pacific Squadron on the frigate USS Constitution. In 1841 he was promoted to Commander and in 1845 he was placed in charge of Norfolk Navy Yard as an inspector.

=== Mexican-American War ===
In 1846, Carpender participated in the blockade of Tuxpan as commander of the brig USS Truxtun, during which the ship struck a sandbar, resulting in the surrender of the officers and men to the Mexicans and the destruction of the ship. In October 1848, while in command of the steamship USS Iris, in rescuing a French ship, the barque L'Eugènie which had struck a bank and become stranded off the anchorage of Antón Lizardo, his initial detention of the ship and crew developed into a diplomatic incident that ultimately involved United States Secretary of State John M. Clayton and French Minister of Foreign Affairs Alexis de Tocqueville.

=== American Civil War ===
Previously retired under the Act of 1855, Carpender returned to duty by 1861, commanding the US Storeship Falmouth, formerly the sloop-of-war USS Falmouth on which he had served from 1829 to 1830. On July 16, 1862, he was promoted to the rank of commodore. He served as prize commissioner at Key West, Florida from 1864 to 1865.

== Post-service life ==
Carpender retired to Shrewsbury Township, New Jersey, where he died on May 16, 1877, at the home of his brother-in-law, Col. E. T. Williams. His age at death was reported by the local New Jersey and Philadelphia newspapers to be 81, placing his birth at ca. 1796.
