= William Sadler (Medal of Honor) =

United States Navy sailor and Medal of Honor recipient

- Born: 1854; Boston, Massachusetts, US
- Died: Unknown
- Military career
- Allegiance: United States of America
- Branch: United States Navy
- Rank: Captain of the Top
- Unit: USS Saratoga
- Awards: Medal of Honor

William Sadler (born 1854, date of death unknown) was a United States Navy sailor and a recipient of the United States military's highest decoration, the Medal of Honor.

== Biography ==
Born in 1854 in Boston, Massachusetts, Sadler joined the Navy from that state. By June 25, 1881, he was serving as a captain of the top on the USS Saratoga. On that day, while Saratoga was off Coaster's Harbor Island, Rhode Island, Second Class Boy Frank Gallagher fell overboard. Sadler jumped into the water and kept the sailor afloat until they were picked up by one of the ship's small boats. For this action, he was awarded the Medal of Honor three years later, on October 18, 1884.

Sadler's official Medal of Honor citation reads:

For jumping overboard from the U.S.S. Saratoga, off Coasters Harbor Island, R.I., 25 June 1881, and sustaining until picked up by a boat from the ship, Frank Gallagher, second class boy, who had fallen overboard.

== See also ==
- List of Medal of Honor recipients during peacetime
