= USS Saratoga (1842) =

Sloop-of-war of the United States Navy

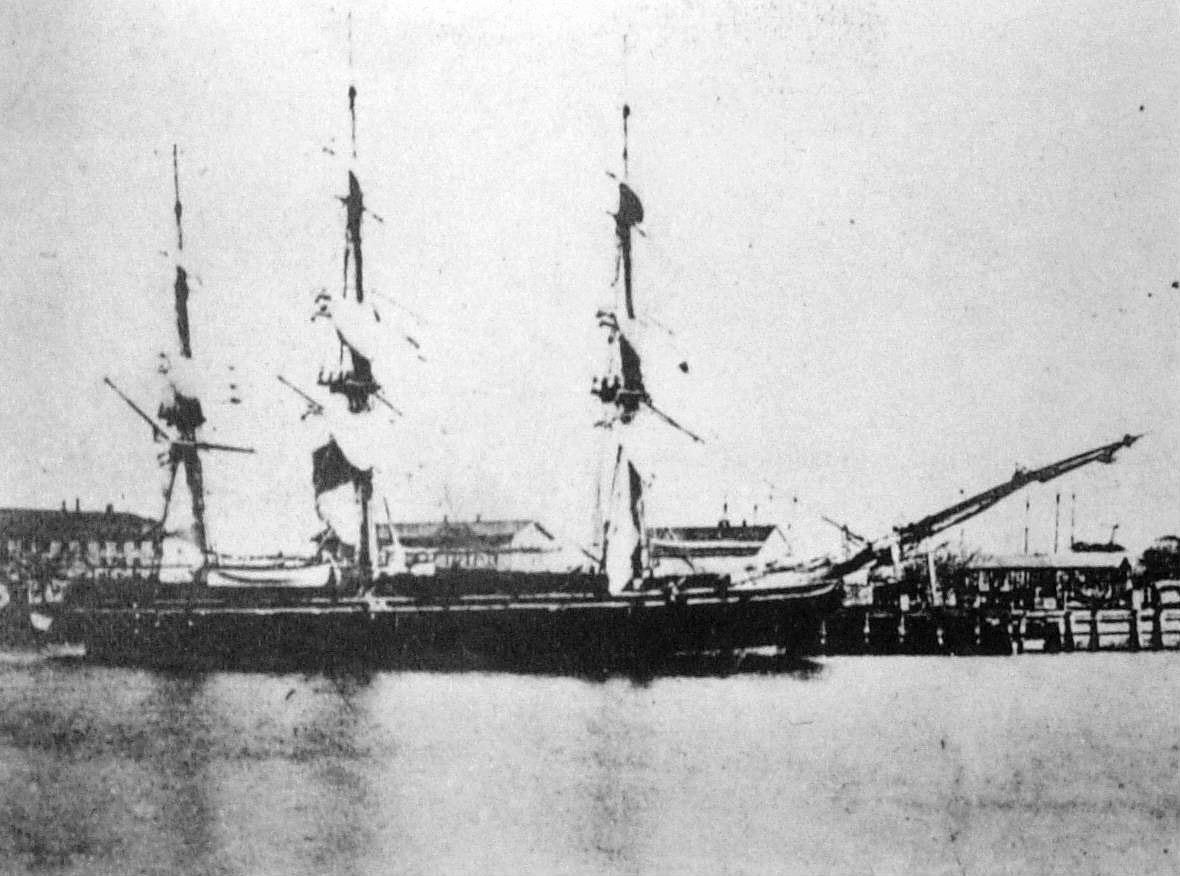
- USS Saratoga (known in Japan as one of Perry's Black Ships)

History

United States
- Name: USS Saratoga
- Namesake: Battle of Saratoga, 1777
- Builder: Portsmouth Navy Yard, Kittery, Maine
- Laid down: 1841
- Launched: 26 July 1842
- Commissioned: 4 January 1843
- Decommissioned: 10 December 1844
- Recommissioned: 15 March 1845
- Decommissioned: 7 January 1847
- Recommissioned: early 1847
- Decommissioned: 26 February 1848
- Recommissioned: 10 April 1848
- Decommissioned: 30 November 1849
- Recommissioned: 12 August 1850
- Decommissioned: 10 October 1854
- Recommissioned: 6 September 1855
- Decommissioned: early 1858
- Recommissioned: early 1858
- Decommissioned: 26 June 1860
- Recommissioned: 5 November 1860
- Decommissioned: 25 August 1861
- Recommissioned: 24 June 1863
- Decommissioned: 28 April 1865
- Recommissioned: 1 October 1867
- Decommissioned: 7 July 1869
- Recommissioned: 16 May 1871
- Decommissioned: 14 October 1871
- Recommissioned: 1 May 1875
- Decommissioned: 7 May 1876
- Recommissioned: 19 May 1877
- Decommissioned: 8 October 1888
- Fate: Loaned to Commonwealth of Pennsylvania for use as maritime school ship 1890–1907; Sold for scrapping 4 August 1907

General characteristics
- Type: Sloop-of-war
- Tonnage: 882
- Length: 146 ft 4 in (44.60 m)
- Beam: 35 ft 3 in (10.74 m)
- Draft: 16 ft 3.5 in (4.966 m)
- Propulsion: Sail
- Complement: 210 officers and men
- Armament: 4 × 8 in (200 mm) shell guns; 18 × 32-pounder guns
- Notes: Ivory Coast Expedition; Battle of Little Bereby; Mexican–American War; Mosquito Fleet Campaign; Opening of Japan; Bombardment of Edo; Reform War; Battle of Anton Lizardo; African Slave Trade Patrol; Capture of the Nightingale; Blockade of the South

USS Saratoga, a sloop-of-war, was the third ship of the United States Navy to be named for the Battle of Saratoga of the American Revolutionary War. Her keel was laid down in the summer of 1841 by the Portsmouth Navy Yard. She was launched on 26 July 1842 and commissioned on 4 January 1843 with Commander Josiah Tattnall III in command.

== Service history ==
=== Ivory Coast Expedition ===
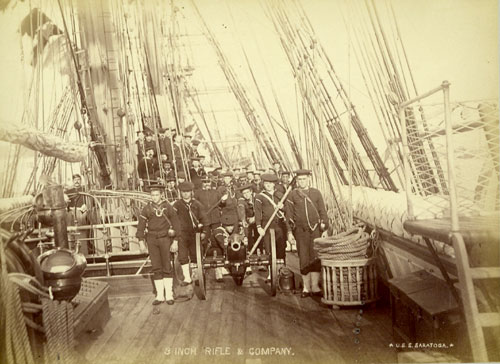
Sailors of USS Saratoga in 1842, one of the first photographs of American combat veterans.

The ship sailed from Portsmouth, New Hampshire, on 16 March 1843, but was dismasted in a gale the next day and forced to return to Portsmouth for repairs. She got underway again on 3 May and proceeded down the coast to New York Harbor to prepare for service in the Ivory Coast Expedition. On the morning of 5 June, she was towed to Sandy Hook, New Jersey, where, at noon, Commodore Matthew Perry came on board and broke his broad pennant as Commander of the Africa Squadron. At mid-afternoon, the ship stood out to sea, proceeded via the Canary Islands and the Cape Verde Islands and reached Monrovia, Liberia, on 1 August. Saratoga operated along the coast of western Africa protecting American citizens and commerce and suppressing the slave trade. She occasionally returned to the Cape Verdes for replenishment and rest for her crew. At Porto Grande, Cape Verde, Saratoga rendezvoused with Decatur and Macedonian on 9 September, and Perry shifted his flag to the latter two days later. Much of Saratoga's service in the Africa Squadron was performed in implementing Perry's policy of supporting Liberia which had been founded some two decades before on the African "Grain Coast" as a haven for freed Negroes from the United States. The new colony was deeply resented by the local, coastal tribes which had acted as the slave trade's middlemen, buying slaves from their bushmen captors and selling them to masters of slave ships. Missing their former profits from the now outlawed commerce in "black ivory", these natives gave vent to their anger by harassing, threatening, and sometimes attacking the black colonists from America. From time to time, they also preyed upon American merchant shipping.

Perry's problem was one of reconciling the conflicting demands of protecting American interests on the African coast, of remaining aloof from African internal affairs, and encouraging the colonists in Liberia. The Commodore's prudence, firmness, fairness, and tact in reconciling these conflicting objectives was illustrated by his handling of two incidents soon after the squadron returned to Liberia in the early autumn. Reports greeted him upon arrival that the hostile tribes had been making trouble for the colonists in the colony of Sinoe and had killed two sailors from American schooner, Edward Burley.

Saratoga sailed from Monrovia on 21 November, and Perry followed two days later with the rest of the squadron bringing along as a guest Liberian Governor Joseph Jenkins Roberts. The American warships assembled at Sinoe on 28 November. The next day, a large force of sailors and Marines accompanied the Commodore and Governor ashore for a conference with an assembly of tribal kings. First on the agenda was the Edward Burley incident. Governor Roberts' questioning of a number of witnesses divulged the following story:

After the schooner's skipper, Captain Burke, had paid a Krooman in advance for serving in the ship's crew, the native deserted. Burke retaliated by capturing two canoes and taking their crews prisoner. Then he dispatched two of his own men after a third canoe, but these sailors were themselves captured. After cruelly torturing the two Americans, they killed them. Once he felt sure of the story, Perry held that, while the homicides were unjustified, the Americans had been the aggressors. Perry then stated that the United States government wished to remain friendly with all African tribes but had sent him to protect American lives and property and to prevent Americans from wronging natives. He then dropped the matter, but remained in the area while Liberian colonists aided by friendly tribes drove trouble-making natives back into the hinterland.

In mid-December, the squadron sailed to Little Berebee to investigate the plundering of trading schooner, Mary Carver, and murder of her entire crew. During the ensuing palaver, when Perry refused to accept the far-fetched explanation of King Ben Krako, a native fired a musket at the American party. The king and his interpreter, who was known to be one of the murderers, attempted to escape. Commander Tattnall of Saratoga killed the interpreter with a rifle shot and the king was also killed in attempting to flee.

After demonstrating the determination and ability of the United States to control events along the coast of Africa, the squadron got underway late in the year for Madeira where it arrived on 18 January 1844. She returned to the African coast via the Cape Verdes and reached Monrovia on 2 March. The late spring was devoted to a cruise eastward along the coast to the Bight of Biafra. Yellow fever plagued the crew during the summer. The ship sailed for the Cape Verdes on 8 July and reached Porto Praia on 21 July. The ship returned to Liberia in September for a last visit before leaving the African coast in mid-October and heading home. She reached Norfolk, Virginia, on 22 November and decommissioned there on 10 December 1844.

=== Mexican–American War ===
Recommissioned on 15 March 1845 with Commander Irving Shubrich in command, Saratoga was assigned to a squadron commanded by Commodore Robert F. Stockton and originally intended for duty in European waters. However, on 22 April, because of tension between the United States and Mexico over an impending annexation of Texas, this naval force was ordered to the Gulf of Mexico. Saratoga departed Norfolk on 27 April and proceeded to the Texas coast. She remained at Galveston, Texas, with Stockton for the remainder of spring. The Commodore sailed for Washington, DC, on 23 June after ordering Saratoga and the rest of his squadron to Pensacola, Florida, to replenish their stores.

On 3 July, Secretary of the Navy George Bancroft transferred Saratoga to Commodore David Conner's Home Squadron which was then operating "... in such a manner as will be most likely to disincline Mexico to acts of hostility ..." Saratoga operated in the Gulf attempting to help Conner carry out this mission until she sailed from Pensacola on 4 December for Rio de Janeiro to join the Brazil Squadron.

The sloop-of-war cruised along the South American coast until mid-summer. Then, under orders to the Pacific for service under Commodore John D. Sloat on the California coast, she got underway on 24 August and headed south along the coast. However, after rounding Cape Horn, the sloop-of-war ran into a fierce storm which caused severe damage and forced her to turn back toward home. She reached Hampton Roads on 29 December and decommissioned on 9 January 1847.

Repaired at the Norfolk Navy Yard, Saratoga was recommissioned in 1847, Commander David G. Farragut in command. Assigned to the Home Squadron, she rounded Cape Henry on 29 March, sailed south along the coast, entered the Gulf of Mexico, and joined Commodore Perry's Home Squadron off Veracruz, on 26 April. Three days later, the sloop-of-war was ordered to proceed some 150 miles up the coast to blockade Tuxpan. She reached the station on 30 April and remained there until heading back toward Veracruz on 12 July. About a fortnight later, she got underway for Tabasco, carrying dispatches; remained at that river port but a day, and returned to Veracruz on 11 August. On 1 September, Saratoga relieved Decatur at Tuxpan and remained on station there, despite a serious outbreak of yellow fever on board, for about two months before heading back to Veracruz. After a month there, the ship got underway for the Florida coast to land her sick and replenish her stores. She arrived at Pensacola on 6 January 1848; and, after disembarking all the seriously sick patients at the base hospital, got underway north on the last day of the month. She made New York City on 19 February and was decommissioned a week later.

On 17 April, a week after recommissioning, the sloop-of-war departed New York City and proceeded via Norfolk, Virginia, to the West Indies for service in the Home Squadron. She returned to Hampton Roads on 27 November 1849 and decommissioned at the Norfolk Navy Yard on 30 November.

=== Opening of Japan ===
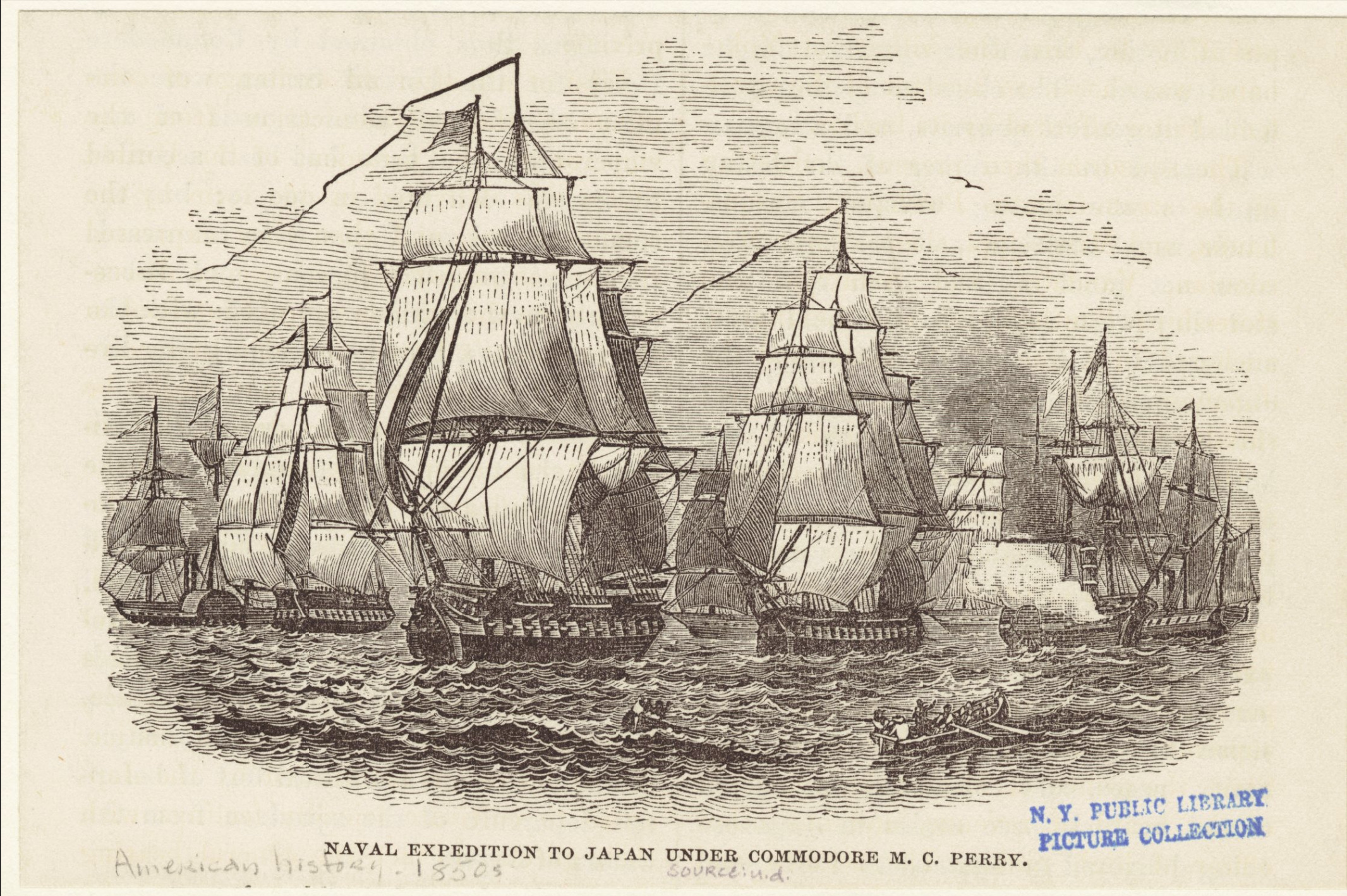
Matthew C. Perry's second expedition to Japan. USS Saratoga is second from left.

Recommissioned on 12 August 1850, Saratoga got underway on 15 September and proceeded to the western Pacific for service in the East India Squadron. The highlight of her service in the Far East was her participation in Commodore Perry's Opening of Japan. After visiting Japan with Perry in July 1853, she sailed for the China coast and protected American interests at Shanghai while Japanese officials discussed Perry's proposals. She returned with Perry in February 1854, and, after the formal signing of a treaty between the United States and Japan on the last day of March, sailed for the Sandwich Islands carrying Commander Henry A. Adams, to whom Perry had entrusted the American copy of the treaty. After leaving Adams at Honolulu, Saratoga sailed south, rounded Cape Horn, reached Boston, Massachusetts, in September, and was decommissioned on 10 October 1854.

=== Reform War ===
The sloop-of-war was recommissioned on 6 September 1855 and, but for a period out of commission in ordinary at Norfolk early in 1858, cruised in the Caribbean Sea and the Gulf of Mexico until decommissioning at Philadelphia, Pennsylvania, on 26 June 1860. She fought in the 1860 naval battle off Anton Lizardo, Veracruz. The Saratoga and two chartered steamers defeated two Mexican ships and helped put an end to the Reform War.

=== African Slave Trade Patrol ===
Reactivated on 5 November 1860, she sailed from Philadelphia ten days later to return to the scene of her first cruise, the west coast of Africa. On 21 April 1861, she captured the slaver, Nightingale, off Cabinda freeing a cargo of numerous slaves. After word of the outbreak of the American Civil War reached Saratoga, she returned to the United States and decommissioned at Philadelphia on 25 August 1861.

=== American Civil War ===
Recommissioned on 24 June 1863, the ship was ordered to the Delaware Capes for guard duty off the Delaware breakwater protecting Union shipping approaching and departing Delaware Bay and performed this duty through the end of the year. On 13 January 1864, she was ordered to Carolina waters for duty in the South Atlantic Blockading Squadron. During her service off the lower Atlantic coast, landing parties from the ship made several raids in August and September which resulted in the capture of many prisoners and the taking or destruction of substantial quantities of ordnance, ammunition, and supplies. A number of buildings, bridges, and salt works were destroyed during the expedition.

As the American Civil War was drawing to a close, Saratoga was detached on 4 April 1865, sailed north, and was decommissioned on 28 April. For the next decade, only two periods in commission for coastal operations (1 October 1867 to 7 July 1869 and 16 May to 14 October 1871) interrupted the veteran ship's rest in ordinary.

=== Training ship ===
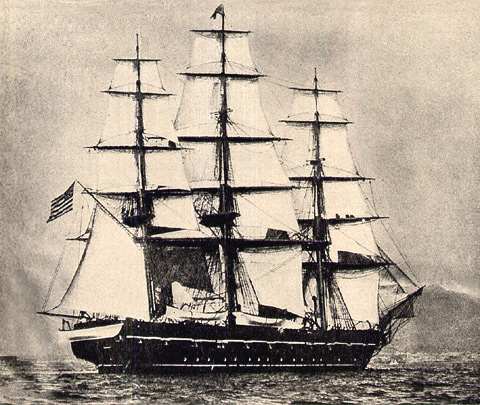
USS Saratoga as a training ship in the 1880s.

Saratoga reactivated on 1 May 1875 for a year as a gunnery ship at Annapolis, Maryland. Another year in ordinary beginning 7 May 1876 preceded her final recommissioning on 19 May 1877 to start more than eleven years as a school ship training naval apprentices. This duty took her to various naval bases and yards along the Atlantic coast and to Europe on occasion. During this period, three of her crew received the Medal of Honor for rescuing fellow sailors from drowning: Apprentices David M. Buchanan and John Hayden off Battery Park in New York Harbor on 15 July 1879 and Captain of the Top William Sadler off Coaster's Harbor Island, Rhode Island, on 25 June 1881. Saratoga was decommissioned on 8 October 1888.

The ship served on loan to the state of Pennsylvania between 1890 and 1907, operating as a state marine school ship for the Pennsylvania Nautical School in Philadelphia, Pennsylvania, until sold there on 14 August 1907 to Thomas Butler & Company of Boston. The ship was burned as an attraction for the amusement of Revere Beach tourists in 1908.

== See also ==
- Union Navy
