= USS Nightingale (1851) =

Gunboat of the United States Navy

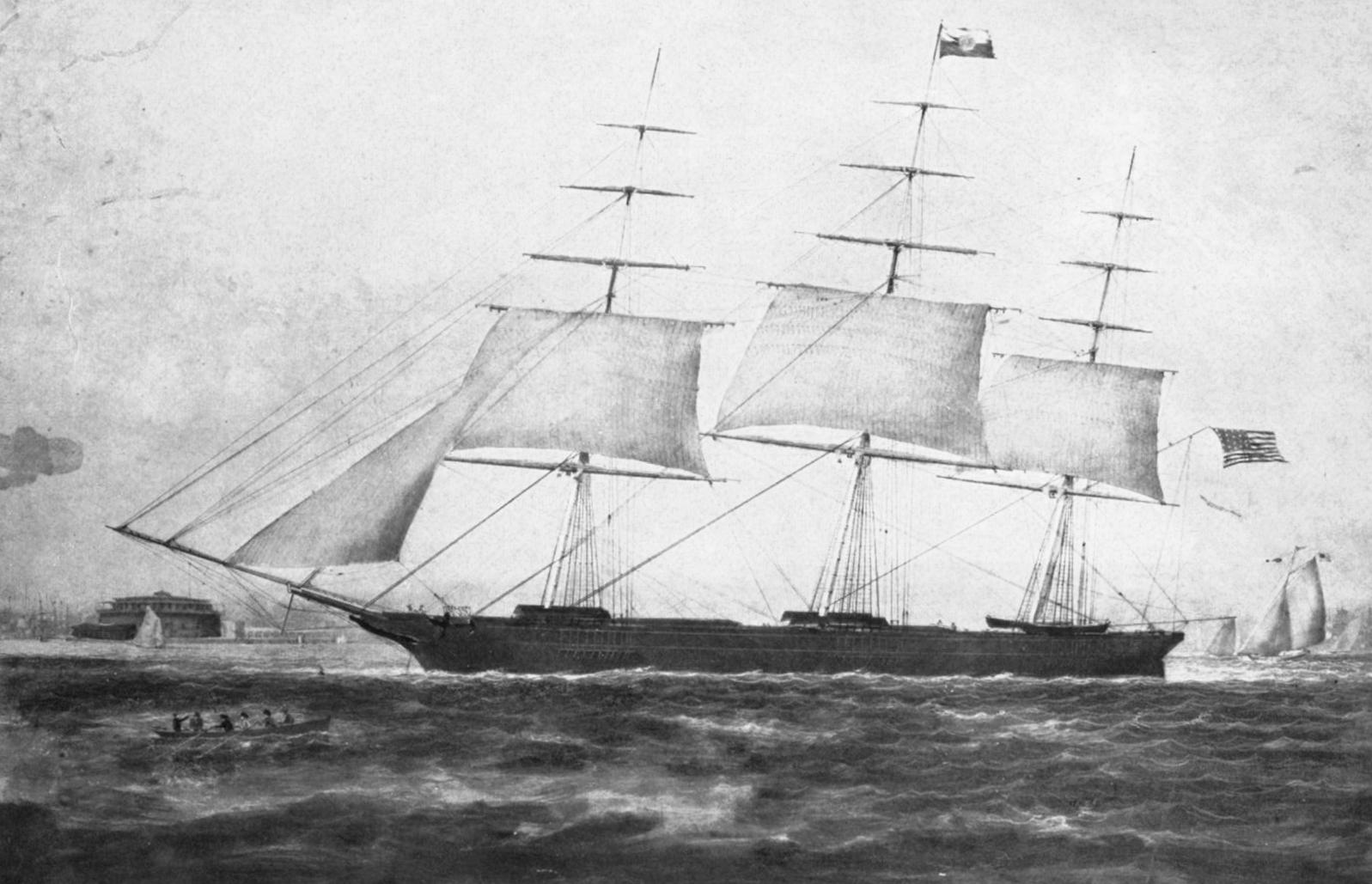
- Drawing of Nightingale, c. 1910

History

United States
- Name: Nightingale
- Owner: Davis & Co.; Sampson & Tappan’s Pioneer Line of Australian Packets
- Route: Tea trade: China to London and New York; Passengers: Boston and New York to Australia
- Builder: Samuel Hanscomb, Eliot, Maine
- Cost: $43,500
- Launched: 1851
- Fate: Sold to the Brazil, 1860

Brazil
- Owner: Salem MA, then Rio de Janeiro (?)
- Acquired: 1860
- Captured: 1861, by USS Saratoga, Africa Squadron, with slaves, off Kabenda, Africa

United States
- Acquired: 1861
- Commissioned: 18 August 1861, as coal and store ship
- Decommissioned: 20 June 1864, Boston Navy Yard
- Renamed: USS Nightingale
- Refit: Fitted out as ordnance ship in Pensacola, 1863
- Stricken: 1865
- Fate: Sold into civilian service

United States
- Owner: Western Union Telegraph Co., San Francisco
- Acquired: 1865 or 1866
- Notes: For use in laying telegraph cable across the Bering Straits
- Owner: Samuel G. Reed & Co., Boston MA
- Acquired: 1868
- Owner: George Howes, San Francisco
- Route: San Francisco to New York with cargo of oil (?)
- Acquired: 1876
- Fate: Sold to Norway

Norway
- Owner: S.P. Olsen, Kragerø, Norway
- Acquired: 1876 or 1878
- Fate: Abandoned at sea in the North Atlantic, 1893, en route from Liverpool-Halifax, NS

General characteristics
- Type: Extreme clipper
- Tonnage: 1066
- Length: 177 ft (54 m)
- Beam: 36 ft (11 m)
- Draft: 19 ft (5.8 m)
- Propulsion: Sail
- Sail plan: Rig reduced to barque, 1885–1886
- Speed: Unknown
- Complement: 186
- Armament: 4 × 32 pounders (15 kg)

USS Nightingale was originally the tea clipper and slave ship Nightingale, launched in 1851. USS Saratoga captured her off Africa in 1861; the United States Navy then purchased her.

During the American Civil War Nightingale served as a supply ship and collier supporting Union Navy ships blockading the Confederate States of America. After the war the Navy sold Nightingale, which went on to a long career in Arctic exploration and merchant trading before foundering in the North Atlantic in 1893.

== History ==
=== Construction ===
Nightingale was designed and built at the Hanscom Shipyard in Eliot, Maine in 1851 by Samuel Hanscomb, Jr., receiving final fitting out in nearby Portsmouth, New Hampshire.

=== Tea races ===
Her first voyage was on the famous 'tea and silk' course, between Shanghai and London, then employing the fastest ships afloat; and a race was arranged between her and the British clipper Challenger, from Shanghai to London, stakes of two thousand pounds being placed by their respective owners on the result. Nightingale was defeated, and her commander, chagrined at the result, and being somewhat in years, resigned, leaving the ship in London Docks, in charge of the chief officer, and took a Cunarder home. The owners of Nightingale, Messrs. Sampson and Tappan, Boston, made light of the pecuniary loss, but greatly deplored the lowering of the flag, and immediately arranged another race, for similar stakes, between the same vessels, over the same course. After consultation with Commodore R. B. Forbes and other leading shipowners, Captain Samuel W. Mather – trained and rapidly advanced by Commodore Forbes, who greatly appreciated him,— then about twenty-nine years of age, of New England birth, and familiar with the China seas, was chosen to command her. Her passage out from London to Angier Point, Java, at the mouth of the China Sea, was by far the fastest ever made. On her return from Shanghai, over the contested course, she beat Challenger to the English Channel by more than a week. The international maritime competition, now pursued in sport, was then conducted in sober earnest by the largest, fastest merchantmen, along business lines, for nautical supremacy for commercial advantages.

=== Passenger trade to Australia ===
In the spring of 1853 Nightingale, still commanded by Captain Mather, because of her speed and general record was chartered by the Australian Pioneer Line, R. W. Cameron and Co., to carry mails, passengers, and freights to Melbourne, with the understanding that she was to proceed from there to China ports, where she would load with tea and silk for London. The gold fever in Australia was reaching its height, and Nightingale's accommodations were speedily taken.

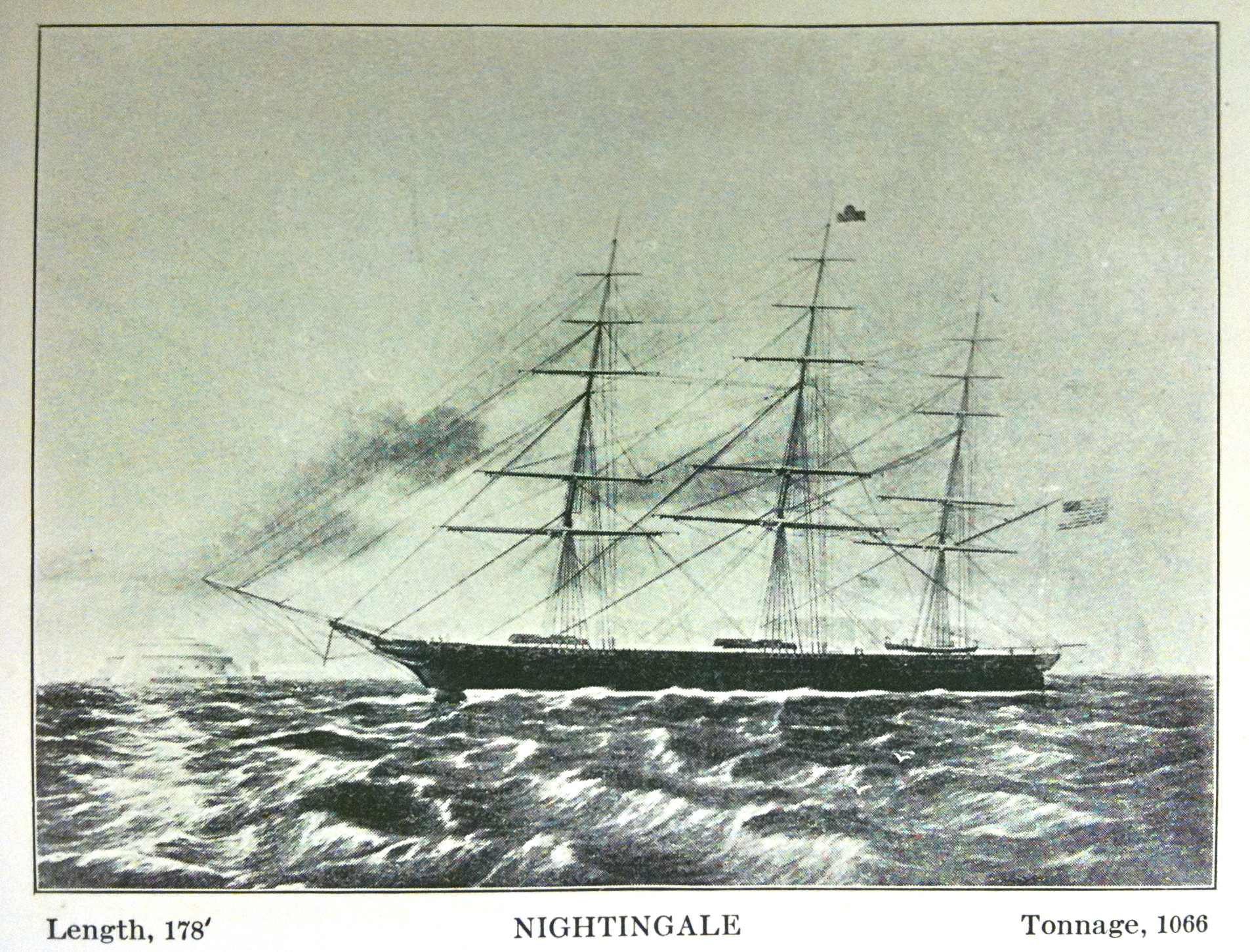

=== As a slaver ===
In the fall of 1860 she arrived in England from New York, and soon it became known around the docks that she had become a slaver, although ostensibly she was loading for St. Thomas* with a cargo of guns, powder, and cotton cloth.

She sailed several times from Cabinda, Angola, to Cuba with a total of 2,000 Africans in irons."

This * is the Portuguese colony of São Tomé

=== Seizure ===
About midnight on 20–21 April 1861, two boats from sloop of war USS Saratoga pulled silently toward a darkened ship anchored near the mouth of the Congo River at Cabinda, Angola. After clambering aboard Nightingale, a suspected slaver from Boston, Massachusetts, the American sailors and marines found 961 men, women, and children chained between decks. 160 would die en route to Liberia. At the point of capture, the prize was preparing to load more slaves before getting under way for America.

=== As a prize ===
Saratoga's skipper – Commander Alfred Taylor – placed a prize crew on Nightingale, commanded by the leader of the boarding party, Lieutenant James J. Guthrie. The captured clipper got under way on the 23rd for Liberia, a nation founded in 1822 by the American Colonization Society as a refuge for freed slaves.

En route, a fever raged through the ship killing 160 of the passengers and one member of the crew. After arriving Monrovia on 7 May, Nightingale landed her passengers, fumigated living quarters, and sailed for home on 13 May. During the first part of the passage, fever seriously weakened the crew, at one point leaving only 7 of her 34-man crew fit for duty. Two more sailors died before the scourge began to subside, enabling the ship to reach New York on 15 June.

=== Purchase by US Navy ===
Nightingale was condemned by the New York prize court; purchased by the US Navy which was then expanding to blockade the Confederate coast, and commissioned on 18 August 1861, Brevet Master David B. Horne in command.

=== As a store ship ===
Fitted out as a collier and store ship, Nightingale got underway south laden with coal the same day, stopped at Hampton Roads on the 21st, and pushed on toward Key West, Florida the following morning. But for occasional voyages north for coal and supplies, she served on the U.S. Gulf Coast through the first years of the American Civil War.

She was with Union ships USS Preble, USS Richmond, USS Vincennes, and USS Water Witch in the Mississippi River near Head of Passes when the Confederate ironclad ram Manassas – accompanied by steamers CSS Ivy and CSS James L. Day – attacked on 12 October.

During the action she ran aground, but the Southern ships did not press their advantage. Nightingale was refloated a few days later, and she sailed to New York with prisoners of war and booty.

Nightingale returned to the Gulf late in the year with a cargo of coal and supplies for the Union Blockaders. During most of 1862, she served the East Gulf Blockading Squadron operating out of Key West. Early in 1863, she became an ordnance ship at Pensacola, Florida, and continued this duty until returning to Boston, Massachusetts on 9 June 1864.

Nightingale was decommissioned at the Boston Navy Yard on 20 June 1864 and sold at public auction there to D.E. Mayo on 11 February 1865.

=== Arctic exploration ===
Nightingale served as the flagship of the 1865–1867 Western Union Telegraph Expedition exploring British Columbia, Alaska, and Siberia toward the aim of laying telegraph cable across the Bering Strait.

Captain C. M. Scammon, U.S. R. M. Chief of Marine ... [commanded] flagship Nightingale.

The Nightingale, a fine, large clipper ship belonging to the expedition, had brought up on her decks from San Francisco two small flat-bottomed steamers, one intended for the navigation of the Yukon River in Russian America, and the other for the Anadyr."

=== Loss ===
After the arctic expedition, Nightingale remained in merchant service until she foundered in the North Atlantic Ocean on 17 April 1893.

== Figurehead ==
[Nightingale] was built as an exhibit at the World's Fair in London, to which she was to carry passengers, and was most luxuriously fitted out for that purpose.

Her original name, Sarah Cowles was exchanged for Nightingale in honour of Jenny Lind, "The Swedish Nightingale" who at the time was touring the United States.

Nightingale's Jenny Lind figurehead ended up in the hands of a Swedish antique dealer in 1994. He spent 13 years researching its history.

Svärdskog discovered that the ship had undergone repairs in Kragerö [Norway] in 1885, during which the figurehead had been removed. He was later told by an inhabitant of the farm on which it was found that a relative had bought the 'scarecrow' in Norway, where it had been taken from a ship. The American statue of the Swedish opera singer had thereby quite by coincidence found its way to Sweden.

Nightingale's Jenny Lind and the Great Republic's (1853) eagle are the only two figureheads saved from extreme clipper ships.

== See also ==
- Union Navy
- List of ships captured in the 19th century
