= USS Boxer (1831) =

History

United States
- Name: USS Boxer
- Builder: Boston Navy Yard
- Launched: 22 November 1831
- Commissioned: 1832
- Decommissioned: 1848
- Fate: Sold, 7 August 1848

General characteristics
- Type: Schooner
- Tons burthen: 194 tons
- Length: 88 ft (27 m) (gun deck)
- Beam: 23 ft 6 in (7.16 m)
- Draft: 10 ft 11 in (3.33 m)
- Armament: 2 × 9-pounder guns; 8 × 24-pounder carronades

Service record
- Part of: Brazil Squadron, 1832–1833; West Indies Squadron, 1834; Pacific Squadron, 1835–1840; Home Squadron, 1842–1844; Africa Squadron, 1846–1848

USS Boxer of the United States Navy was a 10-gun schooner, launched on 22 November 1831 by the Boston Navy Yard, and commissioned sometime in 1832, with Lt. Benjamin Payne in command; this was the second U.S. Navy ship to be named for the original HMS Boxer, which had been captured from the British during the War of 1812.

== Service history ==
Her first mission was to the American Colonization Society (ACS) colony of Liberia, with orders to join the Peacock off the coast of Brazil and both to proceed to the Pacific in support of the frigate Potomac on the first Sumatran Expedition to suppress piracy in the East Indies; the ships fail to rendezvous until 5 June 1834, "in the unhealthy roadstead of Batavia." Boxer then returned to join the West Indies Squadron. In 1835, she began a two-year tour of duty on the Pacific Station. After a period laid up undergoing repairs Boxer resumed duty on the Pacific Station from 1838 to 1840. Following two years apparently spent laid up, the schooner went to sea with the Home Squadron between 1842 and 1844. In 1846, Boxer was posted to the Africa Squadron, the primary mission of which was the suppression of the slave trade. That assignment lasted until the summer of 1848 when she returned to the United States.

Boxer was sold at Philadelphia, Pennsylvania, on 7 August 1848.
