= USS Yorktown (1839) =

Sloop-of-war of the United States Navy

Coordinates: 15°20′59″N 23°10′52″W

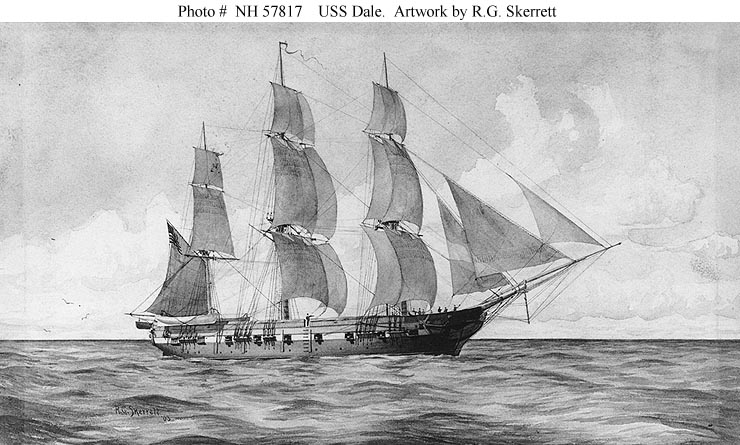
- The sloop-of-war USS Dale, similar in design to the Yorktown.

History

United States
- Name: USS Yorktown
- Namesake: Yorktown, Virginia
- Builder: Norfolk Navy Yard
- Laid down: 1838
- Launched: 17 June 1839
- Commissioned: 15 November 1840
- Decommissioned: 11 August 1843
- Recommissioned: 7 August 1844
- Decommissioned: 9 June 1846
- Recommissioned: 22 November 1848
- Fate: Sunk, 6 September 1850

General characteristics
- Type: Sloop-of-war
- Displacement: 566 long tons (575 t)
- Length: 117.7 ft (35.9 m)
- Beam: 33.9 ft (10.3 m)
- Draft: 15.5 ft (4.7 m)
- Complement: 150 officers and men
- Armament: 14 × 32 pdr (15 kg) guns, 2 × 12 pdr (5.4 kg) long guns

The first USS Yorktown was a 16-gun sloop-of-war of the United States Navy. Used mostly for patrolling in the Pacific and anti-slave trade duties in African waters, the vessel was wrecked off Maio, Cape Verde in 1850.

== Construction and commissioning ==
Yorktown was one of six war ships authorized to be constructed by The Congressional Act of 3 April 1837. The first of this group was Princeton, the Navy's first screw steamer. The other five became the third-class sloops Yorktown, Dale, Preble, Marion, and Decatur and were built to the design of John Lenthall. She was laid down in 1838 by the Norfolk Navy Yard, launched on 17 June 1839, and commissioned on 15 November 1840, Commander John H. Aulick in command.

== Pacific sailing ==
Yorktown departed Hampton Roads on 13 December 1840, bound for the Pacific. After calling at Rio de Janeiro from 23 January to 5 February 1841, the sloop rounded Cape Horn and arrived at Valparaíso, Chile, on 20 March 1841.

The ship operated along the Pacific coast of South America until 26 May, when she sailed from Callao, Peru, bound for the Pacific isles. Looking after the interests of the American whaling industry and of the nation's ocean commerce, she called at the Marquesas, the Society Islands, New Zealand, and the Hawaiian Islands. After completing her mission in the South and Central Pacific, she departed Honolulu on 6 November and headed for the coast of Mexico. Yorktown called at Mazatlán before heading south to resume operations along the coast of South America. She continued her cruising – primarily out of Callao and Valparaíso – through the early fall of 1842, when she departed Callao on 23 September, bound for San Francisco, where she arrived on 27 October.

Shifting to Monterey on 11 November, the sloop called again at Mazatlán on the 22nd before she proceeded to Valparaiso. Yorktown remained at that port until she got underway on 2 May 1843 for the east coast of the United States. After rounding Cape Horn and calling at Rio de Janeiro, she arrived at New York on 5 August. Six days later, the sloop was decommissioned.

== African slave duty ==
Placed in active service once more, on 7 August 1844, with Cdr. Charles H. Bell in command, Yorktown departed New York on 11 October, bound for Funchal, Madeira. After proceeding thence to Porto Praya, the sloop joined the Africa Squadron on 27 November.

Yorktown ranged up and down the west coast of Africa, going as far south as Cape Town, Cape Colony, as she labored to curtail the slave trade. In the course of her patrols, the vigilant sloop captured slave-ships Pons, Panther, and Patuxent. On 2 May 1846, Yorktown departed Porto Praya and returned to the east coast of the United States, reaching Boston on the 29th. There, on 9 June, the sloop was once again decommissioned.

Subsequently recommissioned at Boston, she sailed on 22 November 1848 for her second deployment with the African Squadron. On board at this time as acting Master was future Confederate Navy commander William Harwar Parker. Still engaged in hunting down slave ships, Yorktown cruised along the African coast, carefully observing each ship she encountered for any sign of the illicit traffic in human flesh.

== Sinking ==
On 30 August 1850 Yorktown sailed from Cape Palmas, Liberia for the Cape Verde Islands where she was to be relieved by her sister ship the Dale. On 6 September 1850, she struck an uncharted reef about a mile off the northern coast of Maio Island in the Cape Verde Islands. Although the ship broke up in a very short time, not a life was lost in the wreck.

The crew of Yorktown lived on Maio Island for over a month which, according to Parker, relaxation was the norm and the crew did little more than "relax and play in donkey races." On 8 October, the USS Dale arrived to pick up the crew and they were transferred to the USS John Adams which sailed for Norfolk, arriving in December 1850.

== Discovery ==
In 1999, the Portuguese company Arqueonautas Worldwide S.A. recovered various articles from the wreck of the Yorktown, which were subsequently auctioned at Sotheby's in London. In early 2001, the U.S. Department of Justice informed Sotheby's that under United States law (principally the National Historic Preservation Act of 1966, and subsequently the 2005 Sunken Military Craft Act) all wrecks of ships and aircraft remain the property of the U.S. Government. Sotheby's returned the objects; which included cutlery, coins, sword hilts and scabbards, a powder flask, and various ship fittings.
