= USS Dale (1839) =

Sloops-of-war of the United States Navy

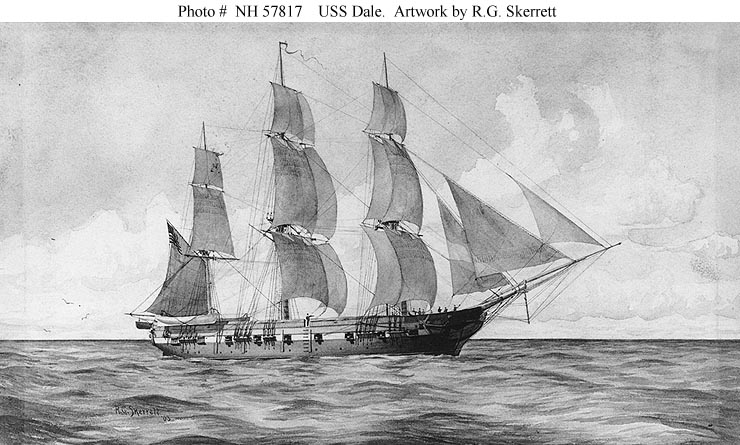
- USS Dale

History

United States
- Name: USS Dale
- Namesake: Richard Dale, Commodore U.S. Navy
- Builder: Philadelphia Navy Yard
- Launched: 8 November 1839
- Commissioned: 11 December 1839
- Decommissioned: May 1859
- Recommissioned: 30 June 1861
- Decommissioned: 20 July 1865
- Recommissioned: 29 May 1867
- Renamed: Oriole, 30 November 1904
- Fate: Transferred to the U.S. Revenue Cutter Service, 23 July 1906

General characteristics
- Type: Sloop-of-war
- Tonnage: 566
- Length: 117 ft (36 m)
- Beam: 32 ft (9.8 m)
- Draft: 15 ft 8 in (4.78 m)
- Propulsion: Sail
- Speed: 13 kn (24 km/h; 15 mph)
- Complement: 150 officers and enlisted
- Armament: 14 × 32-pounder guns, 2 × 12-pounder guns

USS Dale (later Oriole) was a sloop-of-war in the United States Navy commissioned on 11 December 1839. Dale was involved in the Mexican–American War, the American Civil War, operations along Africa to suppress slave trade, and was used by the U.S. Revenue Cutter Service and later the U.S. Coast Guard, among other activities. Dale was placed into ordinary (naval reserve) numerous times.

== Construction and commissioning ==
Dale was one of six warships authorized to be constructed by The Congressional Act of 3 April 1837. The first of this group was Princeton, the Navy's first screw steamer. The other five became the third-class sloops Dale, Yorktown, Preble, Marion, and Decatur and were built to the design of John Lenthall. Dale was the only one of the five built at the Philadelphia Naval Yard and was fastest of the five. She was built under the supervision of Charles Stewart, Commandant, of the navy yard at the time

Dale was launched on 8 November 1839, commissioned on 11 December 1839 with Commander John Gwinn in command and was taken to Norfolk Navy Yard to be readied for sea. She was named in memorial of Richard Dale (6 November 1756 – 26 February 1826) who was a prisoner of war three times during the American Revolutionary War, an officer upon the founding of the United States Navy and commodore of the Tripoli blockade during the First Barbary War in North Africa. Dale was the first of five ships named for Richard Dale.

== First and second cruise ==
Dale's first cruise, which she sailed from Norfolk on 13 December 1840, took her around Cape Horn to the Pacific Station. Based at Valparaíso, Chile, she patrolled the eastern waters of the Pacific Ocean to protect American commerce and the whaling industry. During the late summer of 1842 Dale Commanded by Dornin was part of the Pacific fleet under Commodore Thomas Jones. Commodore Jones, while stationed with his fleet in Callao, Peru understood, incorrectly, from local news papers that war had broken out between Mexico and the United States, prompting Commodore Jones to capture the Mexican town of Monterey, California. Dale was not present for the capture of Monterey as Dornin had been directed by Thomas to Panama with a dispatch to Washington, D.C., stating his intention to capture Mexican towns along the Pacific coast. Shortly after capturing Monterey Thomas realized that a state of war did not exist and regressed from Monterey.

Upon Dale's return to the east coast in October 1843, she went into ordinary at New York City until early in 1846, when she was refitted for a second cruise in the Pacific. Sailing from New York on 6 June 1846, Dale arrived at Valparaiso on 8 September, and cruised the coast of South America.

== Mexican–American War ==
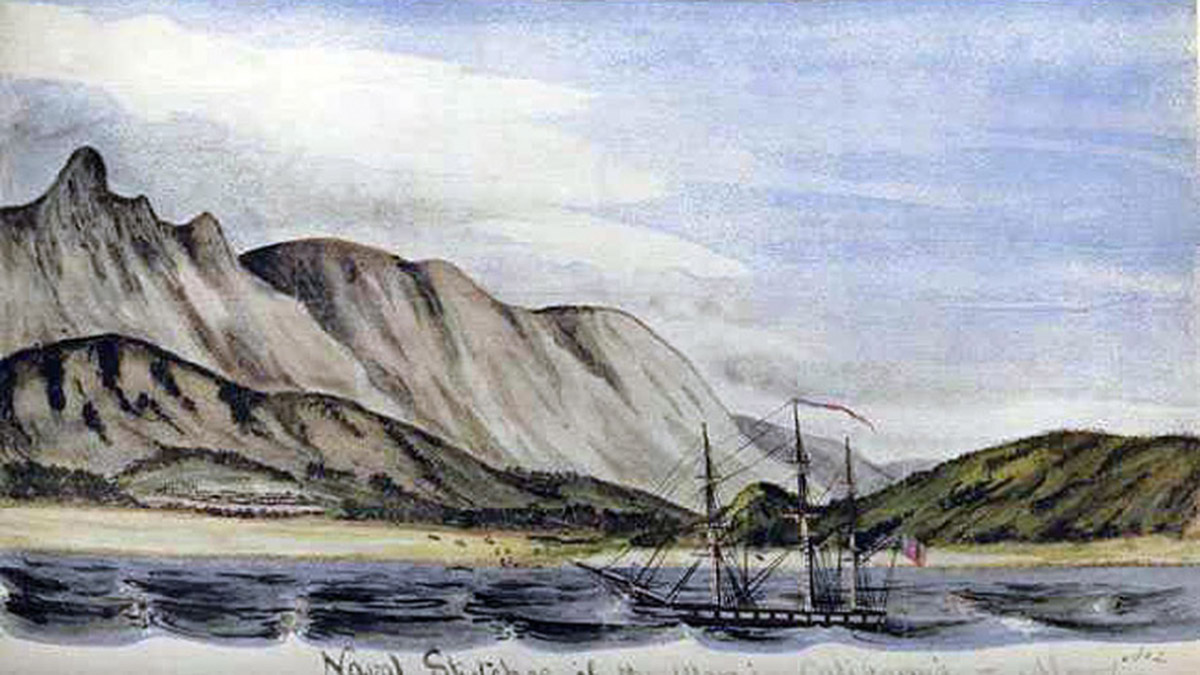
USS Dale off coast of Jose del Cabo Mexico

With the outbreak of the Mexican–American War Dale, under Commander Thomas O. Selfridge, was ordered north. The sloop arrived off Monterey, California, in January 1847, and through the remaining year of the war, cruised the coasts of Mexico and California. Not only did she capture several Mexican privateers and merchantmen, but landing parties she sent ashore raised the U.S. flag over the towns of Guaymas on the main land and Mulege on the Baja California Peninsula.

Dale arrived in San José del Cabo on 19 September 1847 with USS Congress. Dale was assigned the duty of preventing traffic between Guaymas and Mulege. On 27 September Dale stopped at Loreto while heading north and it was learned that approximately 200 men had been landed at Mulege from Guaymas. On 30 September she arrived in the port of Mulege under a flag of truce. The party led by Lt. Tunis A.M. Craven asking the local government to pledge support for the United States as the United States considered the area to be part of the United States. The Mexican Privateer Magdelina was confiscated from the port. On 2 October after the refusal by local leaders, fifty sailors plus marines were landed at Mulege, but they were faced by artillery and significant opposition. Using the excuse of encroaching nightfall at a later date to justify their sudden departure, in truth the Battle of Mulege was a substantial victory for the Mexican forces, hence the current official appellation for the town, i.e., "Heroica Mulege".

Another account of the Battle of Mulege provides a different perspective. USS Dale commanded by Selfridge on way to Guaymas learned of enemy forces in Mulege with an estimated force of 150 men. Four boats from Dale commanded by Lt. Craven, under the protective cover of Dale commandeered a Mexican schooner without resistance. The following day, 1 October 1847, Lt. Craven with 50 sailors plus marines landed. Under barrage of round shell and shot from Dale the Mexican forces abandoned the village and were pursued up the valley by Lt. Craven's forces. Craven's forces scoured the valley for a distance of about three miles coming under occasional light assault from ambush. Craven, fearing the possibility than his men were being led into an ambush, returned with his men to Dale. Lt. Craven when patrolling later off Mulege on the Liberta gathered intelligence that actually only 100 fighters were in the Mulege area on 2 Oct.

Dale arrived in Guaymas on 8 November 1847 relieving USS Portsmouth from guarding the port. Commander Selfridge, under cover fire from Dale, captured the town of Guaymas. The only American injury was a serious musket shot in Commander Selfridge's foot. Dale remained off Guaymas until 23 December when she was relieved by USS Southampton. Following the ending of the war in February 1848, Dale continued to patrol until the summer of 1849, when she sailed for the east coast, arriving at New York on 22 August 1849. Dale was placed in ordinary at New York from August 1849 – August 1850.

== African anti-slavery ==
Dale made three extended cruises along the African coast as part of the Africa Squadron and Atlantic Anti-Slavery Operations of the United States to suppress the slave trade. In August 1850 she was recommissioned and left for the Cape Verde Islands to relieve the USS Yorktown. On 8 October 1850, upon arriving in the Cape Verde Islands, Dale picked up the survivors of the Yorktown on Maio Island. The Yorktown sunk, without loss of life, on an unmarked reef one mile north of Maio Island 33 days previous. The Yorktown's crew were transported by Dale to Porto Praya where the USS John Adams transported them back to the United States. Near the end of this tour Dale bombarded the small Kingdom of Johanna, in August 1851. While part of the African Squadron in 1851 she sailed 28,313 miles (45,565 km) and 252 days averaging 112 miles (180 km) per day. Dale reportedly captured the slave ship W.G. Lewis 6 November 1857 off the coast of Kongo. Dale went out of commission in May 1859

== American Civil War ==
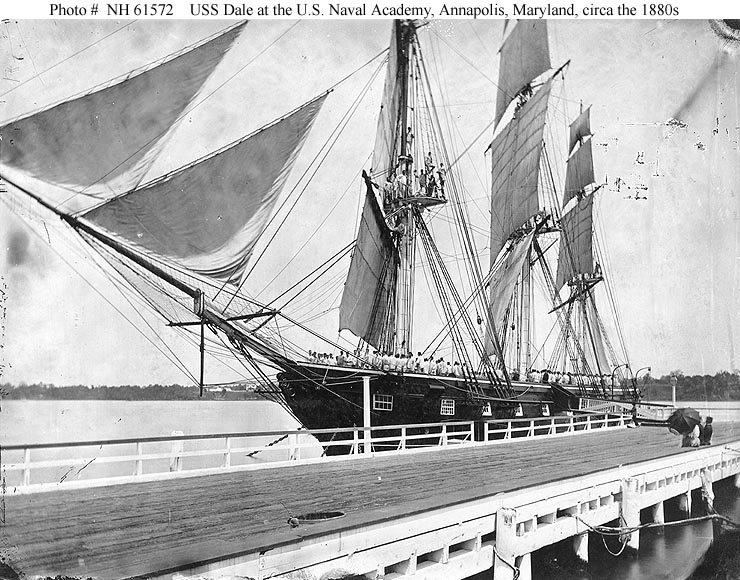
USS Dale at Naval Academy, Annapolis, MD

Dale was recommissioned on 30 June 1861 at Portsmouth Naval Shipyard, Kittery, Maine, and sailed to join the South Atlantic Blockading Squadron, capturing two schooners on her passage to Port Royal, South Carolina. Here she served as store and guard ship until sailing north for repairs on 30 September 1862. After repairs Dale arrived at Key West on 10 December for duty as ordnance store ship until 3 July 1865.

== End of career in the Navy ==
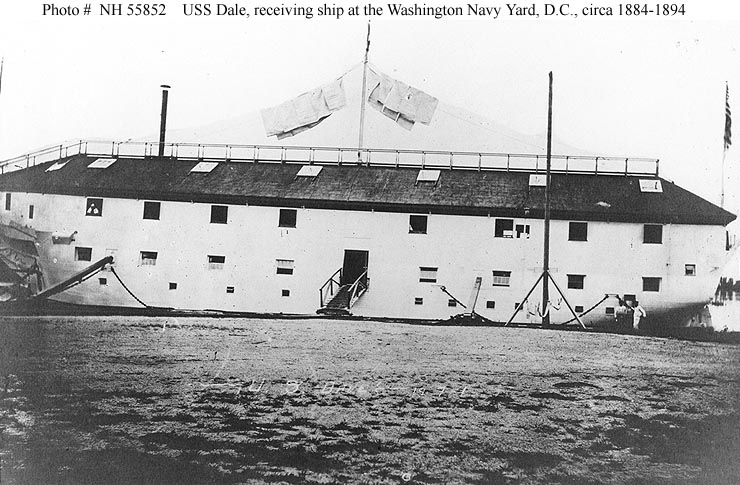
USS Dale as receiving ship Washington Naval Yard, Washington DC

Dale was decommissioned again at Philadelphia on 20 July 1865, and was in ordinary at Norfolk until recommissioned on 29 May 1867. While at Norfolk on 22 January 1886, Landsman Joseph H. Davis rescued a fellow sailor from drowning, for which he was awarded the Medal of Honor. Dale was recommissioned to serve as a training ship at the United States Naval Academy Annapolis, MD, until 1884. After leaving Annapolis Dale served as a receiving ship at Washington Navy Yard until 1894.

== Other service ==
Dale was transferred to the Maryland Naval Militia in 1895, and renamed Oriole on 30 November 1904. Dale was struck from the Navy List 27 February 1906 and on 23 July 1906 she was transferred to the United States Revenue Cutter Service at Baltimore, Maryland. She, along with the Salmon P. Chase, served as a dormitory-barracks ship for the cadets in the School of Instruction at Arundel Cove, Maryland. Due to open seams in the hull, Oriole required almost constant operation of her bilge pump, or she would sink at the dock. Finally, on 17 September 1921, almost 82 years since her launch, Oriole was returned to the U.S. Navy and sold as a hulk to Mr. William Mattson of Baltimore.
