= USS Chotank =

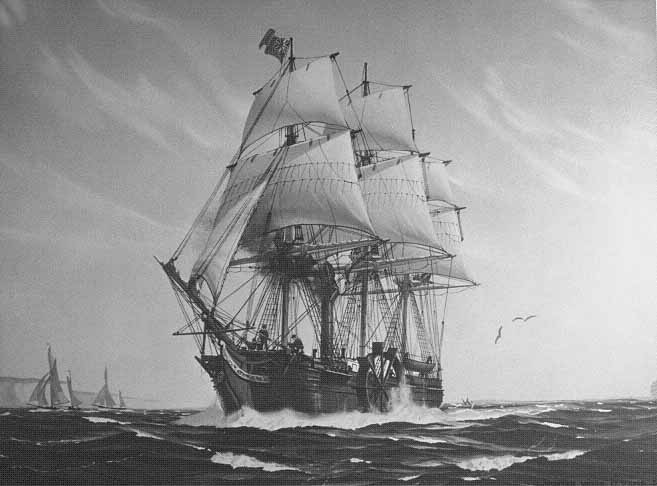
- Chotank as Savannah

History

United States
- Name: Chotank
- Ordered: as Savannah
- Acquired: 2 July 1861
- Commissioned: 1861
- Decommissioned: 1862
- Stricken: 1865 (est.)
- Captured: by Union Navy forces; 3 June 1861
- Fate: Sold, 15 August 1865

General characteristics
- Displacement: 53 tons
- Length: 56 ft (17 m)
- Beam: 17 ft (5.2 m)
- Draught: 6 ft (1.8 m)
- Propulsion: sail
- Armament: 2x 9" smoothbore guns; 1x 11" gun

The USS Chotank was a schooner captured by the Union Navy during the American Civil War. She was used by the Navy for various purposes, but especially to patrol navigable waterways of the Confederacy to prevent the South from trading with other countries.

== Service history ==
The privateer Savannah was captured 3 June 1861 by USS Perry. She was purchased from the New York City Prize Court on 2 July 1861 by the Navy and her name changed to Chotank. She operated as a part of the Potomac Flotilla during the year 1862. The schooner was then laid up at New York Navy Yard and sold on 15 August 1865.
