= USS Truxtun (1842) =

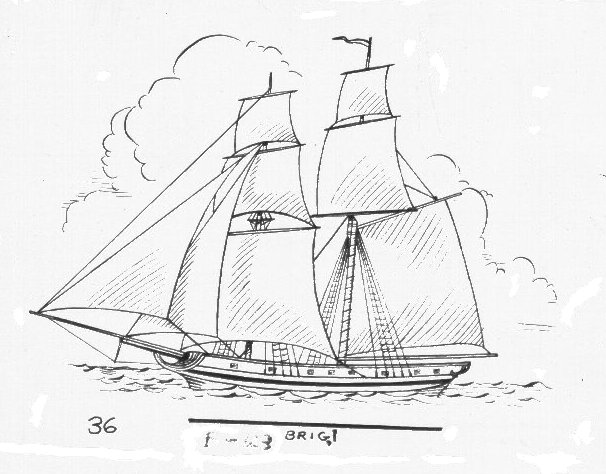
- A brig-rigged warship similar to the Truxtun

History

United States
- Namesake: Thomas Truxtun
- Builder: Gosport Navy Yard
- Laid down: December 1841
- Launched: 16 April 1842
- Commissioned: 18 February 1843
- Decommissioned: 12 September 1846
- Fate: Burned, 22 August 1846

General characteristics
- Displacement: 329 tons
- Length: 102 ft 6 in (31.24 m)
- Beam: 28 ft 2 in (8.59 m)
- Draft: 12 ft 3 in (3.73 m)
- Armament: 10 32-pdr. car., 2 long guns

The first USS Truxtun was a brig in the United States Navy. She was named for Commodore Thomas Truxtun, and was an active participant in the Mexican–American War.

== The ship ==
Truxtun was laid down in late December 1841 at Portsmouth, Virginia, by the Gosport Navy Yard, launched on 16 April 1842; and commissioned on 18 February 1843, Lieutenant George P. Upshur in command.

== Prewar history ==
On 16 June, Truxtun stood out of Hampton Roads for her first cruise. The brig reached Gibraltar on 9 July, received a visit from the American consul on the 16th, and sailed on the 18th to continue her cruise. On 26 July, she hove into sight of Mallorca and, the following day, dropped anchor in Port Mahon. She remained there until 28 August when she resumed her cruise. During the ensuing month, the brig proceeded to the eastern Mediterranean Sea and visited several Aegean ports before putting into Constantinople on 29 September. There, she conducted several missions for the American chargé d'affaires before departing the Levant late in October. Sailing via Port Mahon again, Truxtun left the Mediterranean in mid-November and headed for Norfolk, Virginia where she arrived on 28 December. In mid-January 1844 she moved to Philadelphia, Pennsylvania, where she was decommissioned on 6 February.

On 13 June 1844, Truxtun was placed back in commission, Commander Henry Bruce in command. Two weeks later, she sailed down the Delaware River and passed between the capes into the Atlantic. After visiting Funchal, Madeira, the warship joined the African patrol. She took up station off Tenerife in the Canary Islands to begin duty suppressing the slave trade. For 16 months, Truxtun patrolled off the Atlantic bulge of the African continent. During that time, she visited Monrovia, Liberia; and Sierra Leone as well as the islands of Maio, St. Jago, and St. Vincent. She also took at least one prize, a schooner which was outfitted and taken into the United States Navy as Spitfire. On 30 October 1845, the brig weighed anchor at Monrovia, and she headed west toward the United States. On 23 November, she arrived at the Gosport Navy Yard where she was decommissioned once again on 28 November 1845.

== Mexican–American War service ==
In mid-May 1846, war broke out between the United States and Mexico. Truxtun was recommissioned at Norfolk on 8 June under the command of Lt. Edward Weston Carpender. On the 15th, she passed El Morro castle and anchored in Havana harbor, Cuba. For the next six weeks, the brig operated off the coast of Cuba. On 2 August, the warship cleared Havana and, on the 9th, joined the blockading American fleet just off the Mexican coast at Sacrificios Island. On the 12th, Lt. Carpender received orders instructing him to relieve sloop of war John Adams on station off Tampico. Early in the evening on 14 August, the brig was heading north in a gale about 100 miles from her destination. She turned in towards land in order to be able to provision ashore the following morning. That maneuver brought her dangerously close to Tuxpan Reef, and she soon ran hard aground. The gale continued to blow and drove her harder upon the reef. Still, her officers and crew tried to free her and declined a Mexican offer to surrender. On the morning of the 15th, she dispatched one of her cutters to the anchorage at Anton Lizardo to seek help.

Though stuck fast on the reef, the little warship refused to strike her colors and prosecuted the blockade to the best of her ability. On the 16th, she sighted a sail on the horizon. With the gale still churning the sea, Truxtun dispatched a cutter to investigate the stranger. The boarding party discovered that she was Mexican and promptly seized her. They sailed the prize toward Truxtun in an effort to help the stricken warship but could not get close enough to assist her. Lt. Carpender finally determined that further effort to save his ship would be fruitless. He sent some supplies to the men on board the captured Mexican and ordered them to Anton Lizardo with the prize and with a message indicating his intention to surrender to the Mexicans.

After putting the Mexican crew ashore at Tuxpan, the prize headed for Anton Lizardo. En route, she encountered a schooner. A long sea chase ensued; but, late in the evening of the 18th, Truxtun's prize claimed one of her own. With a prize crew of four on board the new captive, the two small ships set off for the American anchorage. Though they became separated in the night, both prizes reached their destination—the first, on the 22nd; and the second, a day later.

Meanwhile, St. Mary's had entered Anton Lizardo after having previously picked up the cutter and crew Truxtun had dispatched for help on the 15th. In response to the information given him by St. Mary's, Commodore David Conner, the commander of the Home Squadron, ordered Princeton and Falmouth to Truxtun's aid. Princeton hove into sight of the grounded brig early in the afternoon of the 20th and sent a landing party ashore under a flag of truce. The landing party learned that Lt. Carpender and the remainder of his crew had surrendered three days earlier. The following day, Princeton sent a boarding party to Truxtun; but they did not succeed in getting on board until 22 August. Finding that the Mexicans had already taken most of what was salvageable, they took the rest and set fire to the ship. She burned to the waterline and was subsequently struck from the Navy list.
