= USS Perry (1843) =

Gunboat of the United States Navy

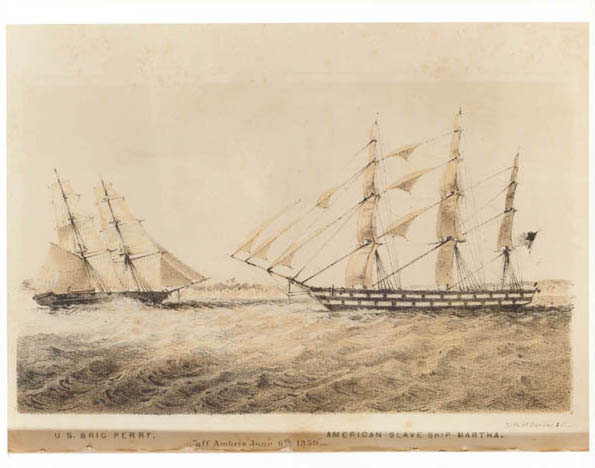
- Brig USS Perry (left) confronting American slave ship Martha off Ambriz, June 6, 1850.

History

United States
- Builder: Norfolk Navy Yard
- Laid down: date unknown
- Launched: May 1843
- Commissioned: 13 October 1843
- Decommissioned: 29 April 1865
- Fate: Sold 10 August 1865

General characteristics
- Displacement: 280 tons
- Length: 105 ft (32 m)
- Beam: 25 ft 6 in (7.77 m)
- Draft: 13 ft 2 in (4.01 m)
- Depth of hold: 12 ft 3 in (3.73 m)
- Propulsion: sail
- Complement: 67
- Armament: two 32-pounder guns; six 32-pounder carronades

USS Perry was a brig commissioned by the United States Navy prior to the American Civil War. She was tasked by the Navy for various missions, including those related to diplomatic tensions with Paraguay, the Mexican–American War, the slave trade, and the American Civil War. She was probably named after Commodore Oliver Hazard Perry.

== Service history ==
Perry was launched in May 1843 by the Norfolk Navy Yard; and commissioned 13 October 1843, Comdr. Samuel F. Du Pont in command. The new brig departed Norfolk, Virginia, 3 December 1843, called at Rio de Janeiro, Brazil, and proceeded via Cape Town, South Africa, and the Straits of Sunda to Macau, arriving 27 August 1844. There she embarked Caleb Cushing, the first American Commissioner to China, and sailed via Hong Kong for the coast of Mexico, arriving Mazatlán, 4 November. Four days later she debarked Cushing at San Blas, for an overland journey to Vera Cruz, to catch a ship home. Perry then sailed via Honolulu for the Society Islands and the Marquesas where she helped win respect and fair dealing for American whalers. She departed Tahiti 16 April 1845; visited Valparaíso, Chile; sailed "round the Horn", reached Norfolk, Virginia, 17 September; and decommissioned on the 25th.

Perry recommissioned 16 May 1846, three days after war was declared on Mexico, and four days later sailed for the Gulf of Mexico to blockade Mexican ports. However, after leaving Havana bound for Charleston, South Carolina, she endured the hurricane of October 10, 1846 driven over the reefs at Bahia Honda Key with every person on board surviving. She was kedged off (From account of ordeal by Naval Lieutenant Richard Schubrick Trapier who was aboard during that time.) and returned to Philadelphia, Pennsylvania, for repairs 4 December 1846.

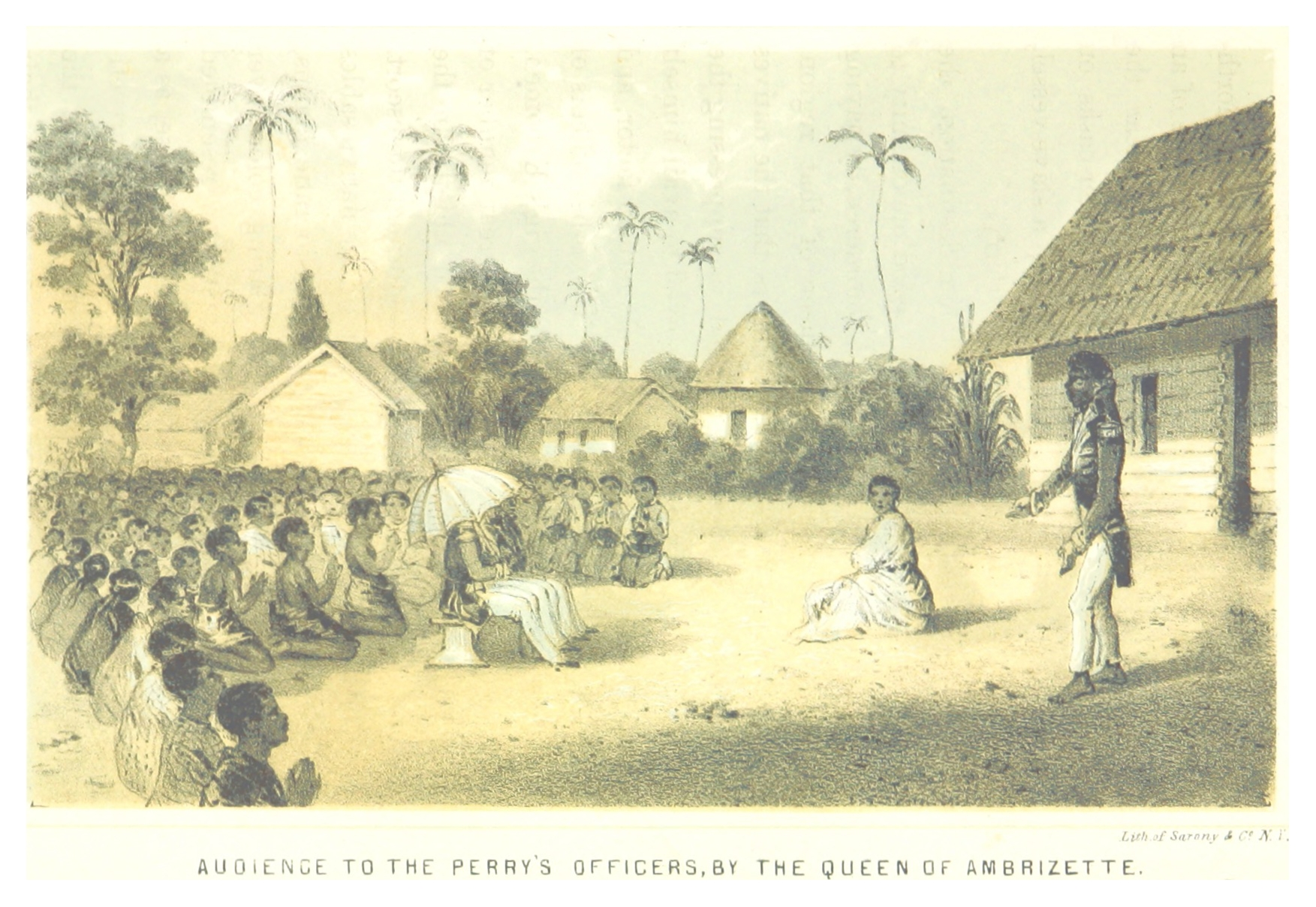
USS Perry officers on a visit in the African Kingdom of Ambrizette, Congo – an audience with the Queen.

Perry got under way from Philadelphia 16 May 1847 to join the Brazil Squadron protecting American interests between Rio de Janeiro, Brazil and Buenos Aires, Argentina. Informed that suspected slavers were bound for the coast of Africa under false papers, she seized American bark Ann D. Richardson off Rio de Janeiro 16 December. Two days later, she took the American brig Independence. Investigation proved that both ships had been engaged in the slave trade and were sent to New York City under prize crews. Perry returned from the Brazil Squadron to Norfolk 10 July 1849 and decommissioned there four days later. Perry recommissioned 17 November 1849 and sailed for the west coast of Africa to help suppress the slave trade. But for a period in ordinary in New York City, 26 December 1851 to 27 April 1852, the brig continued this duty until returning to Norfolk 14 July 1854 and decommissioning on the 20th.

With the exception of a month in commission, 20 March to 27 April 1855, Perry remained in ordinary at Norfolk until recommissioning 21 January 1858. She departed Hampton Roads 15 February to serve in the expedition, commanded by Flag Officer William B. Shubrick, protesting an unprovoked attack on USS Water Witch 1 February 1855. The task force arrived at Asunción, Paraguay 29 January 1859 and quickly won James B. Bowlin, the U.S. Special Commissioner a respectful hearing. Sea power here achieved what four years of diplomacy had failed to obtain: an apology, an indemnity for the family of an American sailor killed in the fight, and a commercial treaty advantageous to the United States. The brig returned to New York 5 June 1860 and decommissioned ten days later.

=== Civil War ===
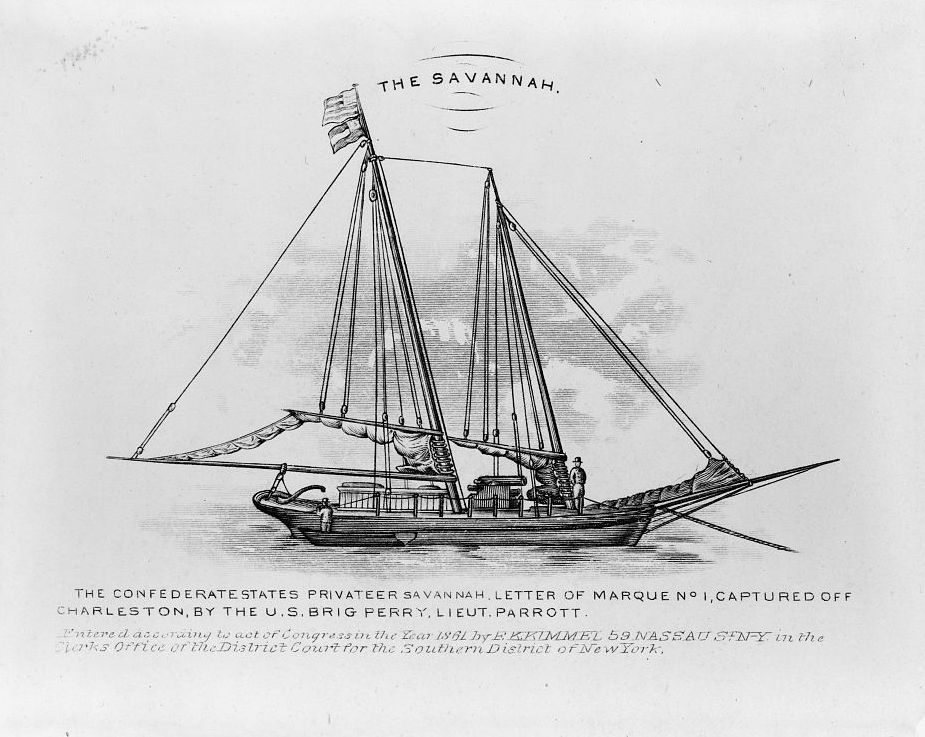
The Confederate States privateer Savannah captured off Charleston by the U.S. Brig Perry, Lieut. Parrott

Perry remained inactive until the outbreak of the American Civil War in April 1861, recommissioning on 23 April 1861. Under the command of Commander John J. Glasson she headed south the same day escorting three transports carrying some 3,000 troops to Annapolis, Maryland, where they landed on the 25th to reinforce the 7th Infantry Regiment then moving South to reinforce the nation's threatened capital. She then returned to New York City (where Glasson debarked for rendezvous duty) to prepare for duty as a blockader and sailed into Hampton Roads 18 May to join the newly established Atlantic Blockading Squadron. A week later she stood out from Fort Monroe and headed south for Fernandina, Florida. On the last day of May, she took custody of the Hannah M. Johnson of Greenport, N.Y. about 15 miles southeast of Cape Lookout, North Carolina due to her having paperwork issued by the Confederates at New Orleans. The schooner was at New Orleans when the war broke out and was bound for New York having received a clearance from the Confederate Government to sail home. She was subsequently released by the Court at New York. The brig took Confederate privateer Chotank (1861) 3 June, and subsequently turned two British ships away from the Southern coast before reaching her blockade station off the mouth of the St. Mary's River on the 11th.

With water running low and needing repairs, Perry sailed north 8 July, reaching Washington on the 21st, the eve of the Union defeat in the first Battle of Bull Run. When word of the disaster reached the Washington Navy Yard, the brig moved into the Potomac River where her guns could command the approaches to Alexandria, Virginia, against a possible Confederate advance against the federal capital. A score of sailors from Perry landed to help man the batteries at Fort Ellsworth. She continued to serve in the Potomac Flotilla for the rest of the year and captured sloops Blooming Youth and Ellen Jane. Late in December, Perry sailed for Aspinwall, Colombia, where she arrived 14 May 1862. The brig headed home 13 November, and decommissioned at New York 3 January 1863 for repairs.

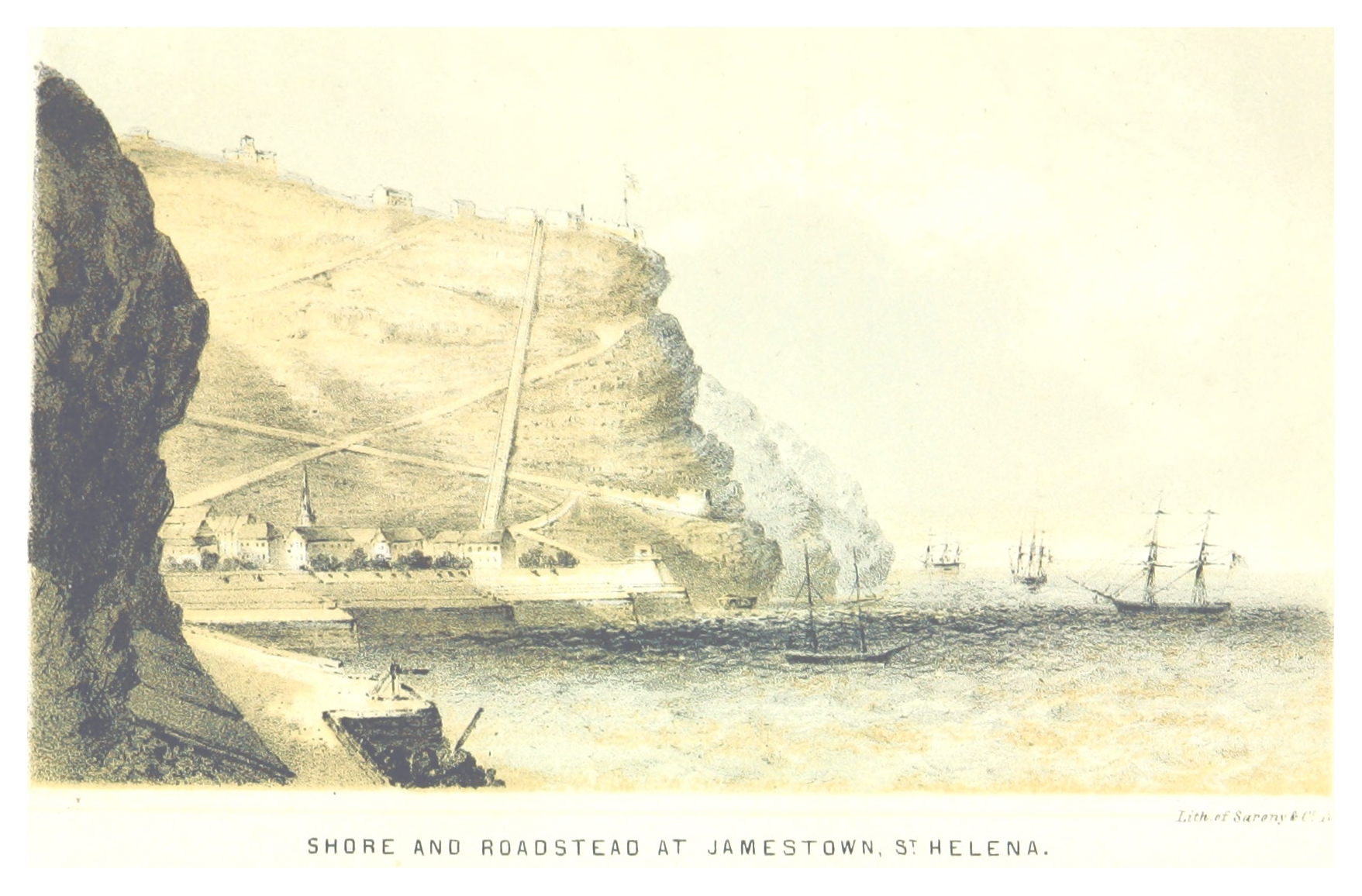
Jamestown, Saint Helena, Naval Basis

Perry recommissioned 28 February 1863 and a month later took station off New Inlet, North Carolina. On 31 March she captured schooner Sue, and on 1 May she took the blockade runner schooner Alma attempting to slip into Beaufort laden with salt and herring from Bermuda. She sailed north 13 August. Following repairs at Boston, Massachusetts, the brig joined the South Atlantic Blockading Squadron at Port Royal, South Carolina 15 November 1863. After serving off Murrell's Inlet, South Carolina, until 15 December and off Charleston, South Carolina, during the siege, she sailed 28 January 1864 to blockade station off Fernandina, Florida, where she remained until the end of the Civil War. USS Perry decommissioned at Philadelphia, Pennsylvania, 29 April and was sold at public auction there 10 August 1865.
