= List of shipwrecks in March 1860 =

The list of shipwrecks in March 1860 includes ships sunk, foundered, grounded, or otherwise lost during March 1860.

== 1 March ==
List of shipwrecks: 1 March 1860
Ship	State	Description
Adeline	Prussia	The brig was driven ashore at the Rammekens Castle, Vlissingen, Zeeland, Netherlands. She was on a voyage from Antwerp, Belgium to Liverpool, Lancashire, United Kingdom.
Antze	United Kingdom	The ship collided with HMS Perseverance (Royal Navy) and sank. Her crew were rescued by HMS Perseverance. Antze was on a voyage from South Shields, County Durham to Barcelona, Spain.
Esther May	United Kingdom	The ship was driven ashore on Yang-tel Cape, China. She was on a voyage from Nagasaki, Japan to Shanghai, China. She floated off on 7 March, but consequently sank the next day. Her crew were rescued.
J. F. L.	Peru	The full-rigged ship foundered in the Pacific Ocean 300 nautical miles (560 km) off the coast of Peru. Her 22 crew took to three boats. Two reached the coast of Peru, the third, with nine crew on board, was reported missing. J. F. L. was on a voyage from Callao to the Sandwich Islands and China.
Lark	United Kingdom	The schooner ran aground on Scroby Sands, Norfolk. She was on a voyage from London to Goole, Yorkshire. She was refloated and towed in to Great Yarmouth, Norfolk in a leaky condition.
Little Henry	United Kingdom	The ship was driven ashore at Wainfleet, Lincolnshire. She was on a voyage from Whitby, Yorkshire to Hull, Yorkshire.
Magic	United Kingdom	The ship was wrecked near Licata, Sicily. Her eight crew survived. She was on a voyage from Licata to a British port.

== 2 March ==
List of shipwrecks: 2 March 1860
Ship	State	Description
Adrien	France	The full-rigged ship was driven ashore and wrecked 60 nautical miles (110 km) west of Alexandria, Egypt with the loss of two of her nine crew.
Camella	United Kingdom	The ship was driven ashore at Walberswick, Suffolk. She was on a voyage from Nantes, Loire-Inférieure, France to Harwich, Essex. She was refloated and assisted in to Lowestoft, Suffolk.

== 3 March ==
List of shipwrecks: 3 March 1860
Ship	State	Description
Apollo	United Kingdom	The ship ran aground on the Shipwash Sand, in the North Sea off the coast of Suffolk. She was on a voyage from Sunderland, County Durham to Almería, Spain. She was refloated and beached at Sizewell, Suffolk.
North Wales	United Kingdom	The brig was run into by the barque Mystery (United Kingdom) and foundered in the Strait of Gibraltar off Cape Spartel, Morocco (35°40′N 8°30′W) with the loss of one of the eleven people on board. Survivors were rescued by Mystery. North Wales was on a voyage from Aux Cayes, Haiti to Gibraltar.
San Roque	Netherlands	The schooner was run down and sunk off Tarifa, Spain. She was on a voyage from North Shields, County Durham to Barcelona, Spain.
Superb	United Kingdom	The ship departed from Charleston, South Carolina, United States for Gothenburg, Sweden. No further trace, presumed foundered with the loss of all hands.

== 4 March ==
List of shipwrecks: 4 March 1860
Ship	State	Description
Olive	United Kingdom	The sloop was driven ashore at Whitby, Yorkshire. She was on a voyage from London to Newcastle upon Tyne.

== 5 March ==
List of shipwrecks: 5 March 1860
Ship	State	Description
Atterdag	Norway	The ship was driven ashore and wrecked on Ameland, Friesland, Netherlands. She was on a voyage from New York, United States to Leer, Kingdom of Hanover.
Augusta	Sweden	The schooner was wrecked in the Aalbek. Her crew were rescued. She was on a voyage from Cimbritshamn to Newcastle upon Tyne, Northumberland, United Kingdom.
Idas	(United Kingdom of Great Britain and Ireland) Jersey	The schooner was wrecked at "Mazarelli", Sicily. Her six crew survived.
Waters	United Kingdom	The brig sprang a leak and was abandoned off the Dutch coast. Her crew were rescued by a Prussian barque. She was on a voyage from Sunderland, County Durham to Rotterdam, South Holland, Netherlands.

== 6 March ==
List of shipwrecks: 6 March 1860
Ship	State	Description
Albert Thomas	United States	The steamboat was destroyed by a boiler explosion in the Delaware River with much loss of life.
Autumn	United Kingdom	The ship was wrecked on the West Rocks, in the North Sea off the coast of Essex. Her crew were rescued by Agenoria (United Kingdom). Autumn was on a voyage from Seaham, County Durham to London.
General Miramon	Mexico	Reform War, Battle of Antón Lizardo: The steamship ran aground off Antón Lizardo and was captured by the steamship Wave (on charter to the United States Navy).
Jessie	United Kingdom	The ship was driven ashore at Harwich, Essex. She was on a voyage from London to Leith, Lothian. Jessie was refloated on 8 March.
May Flower	United Kingdom	The brig ran aground on the Butter Pladder. She was on a voyage from Troon, Ayrshire to Waterford. She was refloated and resumed her voyage.
Princesse Carlotta	Austrian Empire	The ship was wrecked at Castellammare di Stabia, Kingdom of the Two Sicilies. She was on a voyage from Odesa to an English port.
Syren	United Kingdom	The ship was driven ashore at Harwich. She was on a voyage from Sunderland, County Durham to Arundel, Sussex.
Talca	United Kingdom	The ship was wrecked in the Paracel Islands. She was on a voyage from Hong Kong to Saigon, French Cochinchina.

== 7 March ==
List of shipwrecks: 7 March 1860
Ship	State	Description
Arthur Gordon, and Independence	United Kingdom	The brigantine Arthur Gordon collided with the tug Independence 16 nautical miles (30 km) north by east of Great Orme Head, Caernarfonshire. Both vessels foundered. Arthur Gordon was on a voyage from Barrow-in-Furness, Lancashire to Neath, Glamorgan. Her crew were rescued by the tug British Queen (United Kingdom). Independence was towing the full-rigged ship J. K. L. (United Kingdom) from Liverpool, Lancashire to Bristol, Gloucestershire. Her crew got aboard J. K. L.
Crown	United Kingdom	The brig was driven ashore and wrecked 2 nautical miles (3.7 km) north of the Orfordness Lighthouse, Suffolk. Her crew were rescued by the Coast Guard. She was on a voyage from South Shields, County Durham to London.
Jane	United Kingdom	The brig was driven ashore at Great Yarmouth, Norfolk. She was refloated.
Jenny	United Kingdom	The brig ran aground off Lowestoft, Suffolk. She was refloated and taken in to Lowestoft in a leaky condition.
Virginia	United States	The pilot boat ran ashore in thick fog and gale ten miles east of Rockaway Shoals. The crew was able to escape to safety.

== 8 March ==
List of shipwrecks: 8 March 1860
Ship	State	Description
Ellen Stuart	United Kingdom	The ship ran aground on the Pluckington Bank, in Liverpool Bay. She was on a voyage from Liverpool, Lancashire to Calcutta, India.
Emile	France	The ship struck the Lavendee Rock, off the Saint-Mathieu Lighthouse, Finistère and foundered. Her crew were rescued. She was on a voyage from Cardiff, Glamorgan, United Kingdom to Nantes, Loire-Inférieure.
Esmerelda	Hamburg	The barque was wrecked on a rock off Ningpo, China. Her crew were rescued. She was on a voyage from Ningpo to Chinchew, China.
Gonsalve	France	The brig was wrecked on the Doom Bar. Her seven crew were rescued by the Padstow Lifeboat.
Martha Grace	United Kingdom	The schooner ran aground on the North Bull, in the Irish Sea off the coast of County Dublin. She was refloated but consequently foundered, Her crew were rescued. She was on a voyage from Maryport, Cumberland to Dublin.
Triton	United Kingdom	The ship collided with Crosby (United Kingdom) and was beached at Lowestoft, Suffolk. She was refloated the next day and taken in to Lowestoft.
Young King	United Kingdom	The brigantine foundered in the Bristol Channel. Her seven crew were rescued. She was on a voyage from Milford Haven, Pembrokeshire to Tarragona, Spain.

== 9 March ==
List of shipwrecks: 9 March 1860
Ship	State	Description
Commerce	United Kingdom	The brig ran aground on Scroby Sands, Norfolk. She was refloated and taken in to Great Yarmouth, Norfolk in a leaky condition.
Ewan Crerar	United Kingdom	The brigantine struck the Graves and foundered. Her nine crew were rescued. She was on a voyage from London to Boston, Massachusetts, United States.
Hopewell	United Kingdom	The schooner ran aground at Wainfleet, Lincolnshire. She was on a voyage from Sunderland, County Durham to Rochester, Kent. She was refloated and taken in to Boston, Lincolnshire in a severely leaky condition.
Martinus	Netherlands	The koff was abandoned at sea. Her crew were rescued. She was on a voyage from Antwerp, Belgium to Lisbon, Portugal.
Triton	United Kingdom	The brig was driven ashore at Corton, Suffolk.

== 10 March ==
List of shipwrecks: 10 March 1860
Ship	State	Description
Asia	United Kingdom	The ship was sighted at the Equator whilst on a voyage from Liverpool, Lancashire to Calcutta, India. No further trace, presumed foundered with the loss of all hands.
De Witt Clinton	United States	The ship was driven ashore at Manasquan, New Jersey. All on board survived. She was on a voyage from Liverpool to New York. De Witt Clinton was refloated on 26 March and towed in to New York.
Dom Pedro	United Kingdom	The steamship was driven ashore at Aveiro, Portugal. She was on a voyage from Glasgow, Renfrewshire to Cádiz, Spain. She had been refloated by 24 March.
Enfans Cherie	France	The lugger was wrecked on the Fleur. She was on a voyage from the Loire to Gloucester, United Kingdom.
Leda	United Kingdom	The barque departed from Sunderland, County Durham, for Calcutta, India. Sighted in the English Channel a few days later, after which no further trace, presumed foundered with the loss of all hands.
Olivee	United Kingdom	The sloop was driven ashore at Whitby, Yorkshire. She was on a voyage from London to Newcastle upon Tyne, Northumberland. She was refloated and taken in to Whitby in a leaky condition.
Rapid	Belgium	The sloop ran aground on Filey Brig. She was on a voyage from Bruges, West Flanders to Leith, Lothian, United Kingdom.
Wagoola	United Kingdom	The full-rigged ship was driven ashore and damaged 1 nautical mile (1.9 km) east of Folkestone, Kent. She was on a voyage from London to Shanghai, China. Wagoola was refloated on 18 March and towed in to the River Thames.
Woodcote	United Kingdom	The full-rigged ship was driven ashore and wrecked near Dymchurch, Kent. She was on a voyage from London to Adelaide, South Australia. Woodcote was refloated on 18 March and taken in to for London.

== 11 March ==
List of shipwrecks: 11 March 1860
Ship	State	Description
Caroline	United Kingdom	The schooner was abandoned off the north coast of Devon. Her five crew were rescued by the Appledore Lifeboat.
Duc de Trevise	France	The brig was run down and sunk in the English Channel 20 nautical miles (37 km) off Plymouth, Devon by Heart of Oak (United Kingdom). All eight people on board were rescued by a pilot cutter. She was on a voyage from Havre de Grâce, Seine-Inférieure to the Rio Grande.
Mary Bannatyne	United Kingdom	The barque, which had collided with Lucia (France) on 3 March, was abandoned in the Atlantic Ocean. Her fourteen crew were rescued by the full-rigged ship George F. Patten (United States). Mary was on a voyage from Odesa to Gibraltar and Cork or Falmouth, Cornwall.
Red Gauntlett	United Kingdom	The ship caught fire and was scuttled at Calcutta, India. Her 26 crew survived; the ship broke her back. She was on a voyage from Calcutta to London.
Request	United Kingdom	The ship sank in St. Brides Bay. Her crew were rescued. She was on a voyage from Runcorn, Cheshire to Swansea, Glamorgan.
River Belle	United Kingdom	The brig collided with Forest King (United Kingdom) and sank off Cape San Antonio, Cuba with the loss of four lives. She was on a voyage from Cienfuegos, Cuba to New York, United States.
Royal Victoria	United Kingdom	The schooner was driven ashore and wrecked on the Isle of Mull, Inner Hebrides. She was on a voyage from Belfast, County Antrim to Lough Swilly.
Skerryvore	United Kingdom	The brig sank in the Pacific Ocean. Her ten crew survived. She was on a voyage from Newcastle, New South Wales to Melbourne, Victoria.

== 12 March ==
List of shipwrecks: 12 March 1860
Ship	State	Description
Baronet	United Kingdom	The ship foundered in the Bay of Biscay. Her crew were rescued by Maria Spesmea (Flag unknown). Baronet was on a voyage from Liverpool, Lancashire to Bône, Algeria.
Clifton	United Kingdom	The schooner was abandoned off the north coast of Devon. Her five crew were rescued by the Appledore Lifeboat.
Jenny	Denmark	The schooner was driven ashore in the Dardanelles. She was refloated.
Lady Suffolk	United States	The brig was abandoned, set afire and foundered in the Atlantic Ocean 100 nautical miles (190 km) west of the Isles of Scilly. Her crew were rescued by Meereshant and the brig Sappho (both United Kingdom). Lady Suffolk was on a voyage from Liverpool, Lancashire, United Kingdom to Calcutta, Indian.
Philip and Eliza	United Kingdom	The ship struck the Platters, off the coast of Anglesey and was beached at Cemlyn. She was on a voyage from Port Talbot, Glamorgan to Liverpool. She was refloated by the tug Universe (United Kingdom) and towed in to Liverpool.
Queen of the Seas	United Kingdom	The brig was driven ashore at Barber's Point, in the Dardanelles. She was on a voyage from Sunderland, County Durham to Constantinople, Ottoman Empire.
Queenstown	United Kingdom	The brig was driven ashore in the Dardanelles. She was refloated.

== 13 March ==
List of shipwrecks: 13 March 1860
Ship	State	Description
Glencaple	United Kingdom	The brigantine sank off Cape Pula, Sardinia. Her seven crew were rescued. She was on a voyage from "Port Lagos" to Falmouth, Cornwall or Queenstown, County Cork.
Lord Raglan	United Kingdom	The full-rigged ship was wrecked on the Kattywar coast of India. She was on a voyage from Bombay, India to Kurrachee and London.
Queenstown	United Kingdom	The ship was driven ashore in Sarı Siğlar Bay. She was on a voyage from Newcastle upon Tyne, Northumberland to Constantinople, Ottoman Empire. She was refloated.
Russian	United Kingdom	The steamship was driven ashore near Bath, Zeeland, Netherlands. Her eighteen crew survived. She was on a voyage from Hull, Yorkshire to Antwerp, Belgium. She later broke in two and was a total loss.
Stirling	United Kingdom	The steamship ran aground on the South Pampus, off the coast of Zeeland, Netherlands.

== 14 March ==
List of shipwrecks: 14 March 1860
Ship	State	Description
Caroline	United States	The ship was driven ashore at Babbacombe, Devon, United Kingdom. Her sixteen crew were rescued by the Teignmouth Lifeboat. She was on a voyage from Havre de Grâce, Seine-Inférieure, France to Newport, Monmouthshire, United Kingdom. She was refloated on 24 March and towed in to Teignmouth, Devon in a leaky condition.
Eclipse	United Kingdom	The ship was driven ashore at Napier, New Zealand.
Morafield	Norway	The ship ran aground on the Goodwin Sands, Kent, United Kingdom. She was on a voyage from Trondheim to Nantes, Loire-Inférieure, France. She was refloated and taken in to Ramsgate, Kent in a leaky condition.
Osprey	United Kingdom	The snow foundered in the North Sea. Her seven crew were rescued by Silistria (United Kingdom). Osprey was on a voyage from Sunderland, County Durham to Hamburg.
Vistula	United Kingdom	The steamship sprang a leak and sank at Aber Wrac'h, Finistère, France. Her ten crew survived. She was on a voyage from London to Cádiz, Spain and Gibraltar.

== 15 March ==
List of shipwrecks: 15 March 1860
Ship	State	Description
Alverton	United Kingdom	The barque was wrecked at San Sebastián, Spain with the loss of nine of her twelve crew. She was on a voyage from Cardiff, Glamorgan to a Spanish port.
Ann	United Kingdom	The schooner was driven ashore at San Sebastián. Her six crew were rescued. She was on a voyage from Swansea, Glamorgan to San Sebastián.
Cairn	United States	The schooner sank off Cape Canaveral, Florida. Her nine crew were rescued. She was on a voyage from Minatitlán, Mexico to London.
Diana	United Kingdom	The barque was wrecked on the Barageren Sands, off Rangoon, Burma. Her crew were rescued. She was on a voyage from Moulmein, Berma to Calcutta, India.
Frederick William	United Kingdom	The schooner was wrecked at Padstow, Cornwall. Her five crew were rescued by the Padstow Lifeboat.
Medium	(United Kingdom of Great Britain and Ireland) British North America	The schooner was abandoned in the Atlantic Ocean (50°44′N 15°18′W). Her six crew were rescued by the brig Copernicus ( Rostock). Medium was on a voyage from Halifax, Nova Scotia, British North America to Cork.

== 16 March ==
List of shipwrecks: 16 March 1860
Ship	State	Description
Baronet	United Kingdom	The barque foundered in the Atlantic Ocean. Her ten crew were rescued by the schooner Maria Spes Mea (Netherlands). Baronet was on a voyage from Cardiff, Glamorgan to Bône, Algeria.
Eliza	United Kingdom	The brig was wrecked off Sea Palling, Norfolk. Her seven crew were rescued by the Palling Lifeboat.
Jane	United Kingdom	The schooner sank in the English Channel off Dungeness, Kent with the loss of all six crew. She was on a voyage from London to Dunkirk, Nord, France.
Paul	Denmark	The brig was sunk by ice at Aarhus. She was on a voyage from Aarhus to Dublin, United Kingdom.
Quick	United Kingdom	The ship was abandoned 20 nautical miles (37 km) west north west of Cabo de Santa Maria, Portugal. She was on a voyage from Middlesbrough, Yorkshire to Trieste.

== 17 March ==
List of shipwrecks: 17 March 1860
Ship	State	Description
Alma	United Kingdom	The ship was driven ashore near Black Rock, Isle of Wight. She was on a voyage from Portmadoc, Caernarfonshire to Yarmouth, Isle of Wight.
Theda	Sweden	The barque was driven ashore 3 leagues (9 nautical miles (17 km) from Point Centinas, Spain.

== 18 March ==
List of shipwrecks: 18 March 1860
Ship	State	Description
Boadicea	United Kingdom	The ship was driven ashore at Port Talbot, Glamorgan. She was on a voyage from Liverpool, Lancashire to Port Talbot.
Caterina	Kingdom of Sardinia	The brig was wrecked at Bosa. Her crew were rescued.
Charles	United Kingdom	The ship was driven ashore and wrecked at "Inniskerra".
Othello	United Kingdom	The ship was wrecked on Skagen, Denmark. She was on a voyage from Hartlepool, County Durham to Malmö, Sweden.

== 19 March ==
List of shipwrecks: 19 March 1860
Ship	State	Description
Edwige	France	The ship was driven ashore at Benidorm, Spain. She was on a voyage from Sierra Leone to Marseille, Bouches-du-Rhône. She was condemned.
Grietje	Netherlands	The galiot foundered east of Gibraltar. Her crew survived. She was on a voyage from North Shields, County Durham, United Kingdom to Marseille, Bouches-du-Rhône, France.
Ottilia	Sweden	The brig was wrecked on Skagen, Denmark.
Roska	Denmark	The schooner was wrecked on Skagen.

== 20 March ==
List of shipwrecks: 20 March 1860
Ship	State	Description
Auspicious	United Kingdom	The ship ran aground at Whitby, Yorkshire. She was on a voyage from Brussels, West Flanders, Belgium to Leith, Lothian. She was refloated and taken in to Whitby.
Fortuna	United Kingdom	The ship was driven ashore by ice on Anholt, Denmark. She was on a voyage from Riga, Russia to Londonderry. She was refloated and taken in to Helsingør, Denmark in a leaky condition.
Oaklands	United Kingdom	The barque was driven ashore and wrecked in Algoa Bay. Her sixteen crew survived. She was on a voyage from London to Algoa Bay.
Sir Alexander	United Kingdom	The barque was wrecked on the Pole Sand, in the English Channel off the coast of Devon, She was on a voyage from South Shields, County Durham to Lisbon, Portugal.
Statesman	United Kingdom	The ship was driven ashore in the Lye Moon Passage. All on board were rescued. She was on a voyage from Hong Kong to Foo Chow Foo, China.
Tweed	United Kingdom	The ship was wrecked at Palma de Mallorca, Spain. Her eight crew survived. She was on a voyage from Barcelona to Palma de Mallorca.

== 21 March ==
List of shipwrecks: 21 March 1860
Ship	State	Description
Albatross	United Kingdom	The brig was wrecked on the Molasses Reef, south of Inagua, Bahamas. Her crew were rescued. She was on a voyage from Saint Domingo to Falmouth, Cornwall.
Falcon	United Kingdom	The ship was driven ashore at Tacumshane, County Wexford. Her crew were rescued. She was on a voyage from Poole, Dorset to Runcorn, Cheshire.
Mary Dawson	United Kingdom	The ship ran aground off the Kent coast. She was on a voyage from Hartlepool, County Durham to Ramsgate, Kent.

== 22 March ==
List of shipwrecks: 22 March 1860
Ship	State	Description
Generosity	United Kingdom	The barque was sighted off Aldeburgh, Suffolk. She was on a voyage from Sunderland, County Durham to Calcutta, India. No further trace, presumed foundered with the loss of all hands.
Grietze Wemhoff	Netherlands	The galiot foundered in the Mediterranean Sea (38°00′N 6°58′E). Her crew were rescued by the steamship Rhine (Netherlands). Grietze Wemhoff was on a voyage from Newcastle upon Tyne, Northumberland, United Kingdom to Marseille, Bouches-du-Rhône, France.
Myrtle	United Kingdom	The brigantine collided with Devonshire (United Kingdom) and sank in the Atlantic Ocean. Her crew were rescued. She was on a voyage from Puerto Rico to Newfoundland, British North America.

== 23 March ==
List of shipwrecks: 23 March 1860
Ship	State	Description
Admiral Cator	United Kingdom	The steamship ran aground at Hellevoetsluis, Zeeland, Netherlands. She was on a voyage from Hartlepool, County Durham to Hellevoetsluis. She was refloated.
Enterprise	United Kingdom	The schooner was driven ashore at Ballywalter, County Down. She was on a voyage from Inverness to Dublin.
Fleur de Marie	France	The schooner was driven onto rocks off "Locinaseagner". She was on a voyage from Bordeaux, Gironde to Londonderry, United Kingdom. She was refloated and taken in to port.
Florence Nightingale	United Kingdom	The brig was wrecked in the Farne Islands, Northumberland. Her crew were rescued.
Martha	United Kingdom	The schooner was driven ashore at Fortune Bay, Newfoundland, British North America.
Zuleika	United Kingdom	The ship was driven ashore and wrecked at Par, Cornwall. She was on a voyage from Newcastle upon Tyne, Northumberland to Par.

== 24 March ==
List of shipwrecks: 24 March 1860
Ship	State	Description
Annibale Jeanne	France	The lugger was run down and sunk in the English Channel off Dungeness, Kent, United Kingdom by the barque Couriere de Messina ( Austrian Empire) with the loss of three of her six crew. Survivors were rescued by Couriere de Messina.
Effort	United Kingdom	The schooner ran aground on the Holm Sand, in the North Sea off the coast of Suffolk. She was on a voyage from Sunderland, County Durham to Southampton, Hampshire. She was refloated and taken in to Great Yarmouth, Norfolk in a leaky condition.
Endymion	United Kingdom	The barque was driven ashore in L'Eree Bay, on the west coast of Guernsey, Channel Islands. Her twelve crew were rescued by HMRC Eagle ( Board of Customs). Endymion was on a voyage from Ferrol, Spain to Newcastle upon Tyne, Northumberland.
Weekly Despatch	United Kingdom	The trow was holed by her anchor and was beached at Bristol, Gloucestershire.

== 25 March ==
List of shipwrecks: 25 March 1860
Ship	State	Description
Mentor	United Kingdom	The brig ran aground on the Whittaker Spit, in the North Sea off the coast of Essex. She was on a voyage from South Shields, County Durham to London. She was refloated with assistance from the smack Increase (United Kingdom}) and assisted in to Wivenhoe, Essex in a leaky condition.

== 26 March ==
List of shipwrecks: 26 March 1860
Ship	State	Description
Caroline	United Kingdom	The ship ran aground on the Kentish Knock. She was on a voyage from Newcastle upon Tyne, Northumberland to Devonport, Devon. She was refloated and beached at Broadstairs, Kent.
Robert Mills	United Kingdom	The ship was driven ashore at Penrhyn Bay, Caernarfonshire. She was on a voyage from Liverpool, Lancashire to Galveston, Texas, United States. She was later refloated and towed in to Holyhead, Anglesey.
Sir John Easthope	United Kingdom	The steamship ran aground at Breaksea Point, Glamorgan She was on a voyage from Newport, Monmouthshire to Alicante, Spain. She was refloated on 3 April and towed in to Penarth, Glamorgan.

== 27 March ==
List of shipwrecks: 27 March 1860
Ship	State	Description
Emily	United Kingdom	The brig was wrecked on Attwood's Key. She was on a voyage from Gonaïves, Haiti to Boston, Massachusetts, United States.
Rapid	United Kingdom	The brig was wrecked between "Tupelco" and Santa Anna, Mexico. Her eight crew were rescued. She was on a voyage from the Gambia River to the Goazcoalcas River.
Robert Trial	United States	The full-rigged ship was driven ashore at Currituck, North Carolina. She was on a voyage from Liverpool, Lancashire, United Kingdom to City Point, Virginia.
San Francisco	United Kingdom	The barque was driven ashore at Barber's Point, in the Dardanelles.
Spitfire	United Kingdom	The brig was wrecked on Attwood's Key. She was on a voyage from Gonaïes to Boston, Massachusetts.
Theodor	Kingdom of Hanover	The tjalk foundered in the Zuyder Zee off Makkum, Friesland, Netherlands. Her crew were rescued. She was on a voyage from Amsterdam, North Holland, Netherlands to Hamburg.
Virgine	Kingdom of Sardinia	The barque was driven ashore at Barber's Point.

== 28 March ==
List of shipwrecks: 28 March 1860
Ship	State	Description
Canrobert	United Kingdom	The ship was driven ashore at Montevideo, Uruguay. She was on a voyage from Liverpool, Lancashire to Buenos Aires, Argentina.
Cedars	United Kingdom	The ship ran aground on the Velt Bank, off the coast of Cornwall. She was on a voyage from Sunderland, County Durham to Point de Galle, Ceylon. She was refloated.
Doris	United Kingdom	The steamship collided with the barque Flying Spray (United Kingdom) and sank in the North Sea 10 nautical miles (19 km) off Cromer, Norfolk. Her fourteen crew were rescued, one of them by Flying Spray.
La Jeune Ida	France	The brig ran aground on the Pine Keys. She was on a voyage from Havana, Cuba to Havre de Grâce, Seine-Inférieure. She was later refloated and taken in to Key West, Florida, United States for repairs.
Robert Trent	(United Kingdom of Great Britain and Ireland) British North America	The ship was driven ashore south of Cape Henry, Virginia, United States.
Vesta	Russia	The ship was wrecked at Fjaltring, Denmark. Her crew were rescued. She was on a voyage from Torrevieja, Spaing to Riga.
William	United Kingdom	The barque was wrecked at Villaricos, Spain. Her fifteen crew survived. She was on a voyage from South Shields, County Durham to Cartagena, Spain.

== 29 March ==
List of shipwrecks: 29 March 1860
Ship	State	Description
Aln	United Kingdom	The barque was driven ashore at Innistyre, County Mayo. She was on a voyage from Odesa to Westport, County Mayo. She was refloated.
William	United Kingdom	The smack was wrecked in the Isles of Scilly. Her crew were rescued.

== 30 March ==
List of shipwrecks: 30 March 1860
Ship	State	Description
Emilia	Hamburg	The ship was driven ashore near Ottendord, Duchy of Holstein. She was on a voyage from Hamburg to Grimsby, Lincolnshire, United Kingdom and Haiti. She was refloated the next day and resumed her voyage.
Independence	United States	The ship caught fire at New Orleans, Louisiana and was scuttled. She was on a voyage from New Orleans to Liverpool, Lancashire, United Kingdom.
Kadyak, or Kadiak	United States	Bound for San Francisco, California, with a cargo of 356 tons of ice, the 500-ton ship struck a rock off Woody Island in the Kodiak Archipelago in Russian America and sank in Monk's Lagoon on the coast of nearby Spruce Island. Her wreck was discovered in 2003.
Resolution	United Kingdom	The brig was driven ashore and wrecked at St Bees, Cumberland.
Rose of Sharon	United Kingdom	The ship ran aground off Kertch, Russia. She was refloated on 2 April and taken in to Kertch.

== 31 March ==
List of shipwrecks: 31 March 1860
Ship	State	Description
Aid	United Kingdom	The sloop ran aground on the Penny Steel Rocks, on the coast of Yorkshire. She sank the next day.
Albatross	Bremen	The brig was wrecked on the Molasses Reef, south of Inagua, Bahamas. Her crew were rescued. She was on a voyage from Aux Cayes, Haiti to Falmouth, Cornwall, United Kingdom.
Asia	United Kingdom	The full-rigged ship foundered off the Cape of Good Hope, Cape Colony. Her 26 crew survived. She was on a voyage from Liverpool, Lancashire to Bombay, India.
Havering	United Kingdom	The ship ran aground on the Batten Reef, in the English Channel off the coast of Devon. She was on a voyage from London to Hong Kong.
Intrepid	United States	The medium clipper ran aground on the Belvedere Reef, in the Strait of Gaspar. She was on a voyage from Shanghai, China to New York, She was attacked by Malay pirates the next day with the loss of a crew member. Survivors were rescued by the clipper Gallilei (France). Intrepid was set afire to prevent her capture.
Mary and Dorothy	United Kingdom	The ship was abandoned in the North Sea 20 nautical miles (37 km) south east of the Newarp Lightship ( Trinity House). Her crew were rescued by Stella (United Kingdom).
Rover	United Kingdom	The schooner ran aground on the Hook Sands, in the English Channel off the coast of Dorset and was abandoned by her crew. She was on a voyage from Newcastle upon Tyne, Northumberland to Exmouth, Devon.
Swallow	Denmark	The steamship was driven ashore at Middelfahrt. She was refloated the next day.

== Unknown date ==
List of shipwrecks: Unknown date in March 1860
Ship	State	Description
Ann Lockerby	United Kingdom	The ship departed from Cobija, Chile for Liverpool, Lancashire before 9 March. No further trace, presumed foundered with the loss of all hands.
Collier	United Kingdom	The ship was abandoned in the North Sea. She was taken in to Rotterdam, South Holland, Netherlands on 7 March.
Eastern Queen	United States	The steamship was destroyed by fire at Wiscasset, Maine before 22 March.
George and James	United Kingdom	The brig was driven ashore south of Winterton-on-Sea, Norfolk. Her eight crew were rescued by the Winterton Lifeboat. She was later refloated.
Henry Joseph	United Kingdom	The ship was driven ashore before 5 March. She was on a voyage from Callao, Peru to Aberdeen.
Jean Baptiste	France	The ship was driven ashore at Provincetown, Massachusetts before 9 March. She was refloated.
Lady England	United Kingdom	The ship was wrecked at Simoda, Japan. Her crew were rescued.
L. D.	United Kingdom	The ship was destroyed by fire at Buenos Aires, Argentina before 5 March.
Linda	Portugal	The barque was wrecked at "Ilaculumin", Brazil before 27 March.
Louisiane	France	The ship collided with a British vessel and foundered before 27 March. Her crew survived. She was on a voyage from Bordeaux, Gironde to Shanghai, China.
Montebello	United Kingdom	The brigantine was lost at sea before 3 March. Her eight crew survived. She was on a voyage from Swansea, Glamorgan to Marseille, Bouches-du-Rhône, France.
Newark	United Kingdom	The ship was lost before 6 March. She was on a voyage from Hull, Yorkshire to Antwerp, Belgium.
Sea Ranger	United States	The full-rigged ship was wrecked 120 nautical miles (220 km) off the Falkland Islands before 17 March. Her crew were rescued. She was on a voyage from Liverpool to Valparaíso, Chile.
Volta	United Kingdom	The ship was wrecked north of "Bangier Island". Her crew were rescued. She was on a voyage from Liverpool to Hong Kong
Whim	United Kingdom	The ship foundered in the Bay of Biscay between 9 and 29 March. She was on a voyage from the Charente to Dublin and Glasgow, Renfrewshire.
