= USS Case =

Two ships of the United States Navy have been named Case, in honor of Rear Admiral Augustus Case.

- USS Case (DD-285), a Clemson-class destroyer, commissioned in 1919 and decommissioned in 1930.
- USS Case (DD-370), a Mahan-class destroyer, commissioned in 1936 and decommissioned in 1945.
