= Home Squadron =

Military unit of the United States Navy

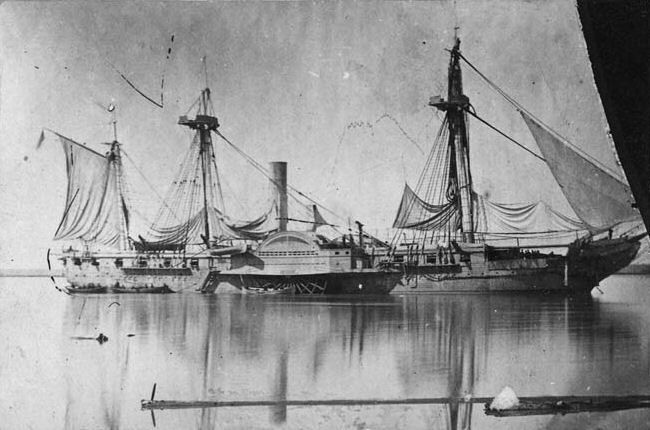
- The paddle frigate USS Mississippi in 1863. She served as the flagship of the Home Squadron during the Mexican–American War.
- Active: 1838–1861
- Country: United States of America
- Branch: United States Navy
- Type: Naval squadron

The Home Squadron was part of the United States Navy in the mid-19th century. Organized as early as 1838, ships were assigned to protect coastal commerce, aid ships in distress, suppress piracy and the Atlantic slave trade, make coastal surveys, and train ships to relieve others on distant stations. It was discontinued in 1861 after the outbreak of the American Civil War, when the Union blockade forced a reassignment of ships to close off Southern ports.

== History ==
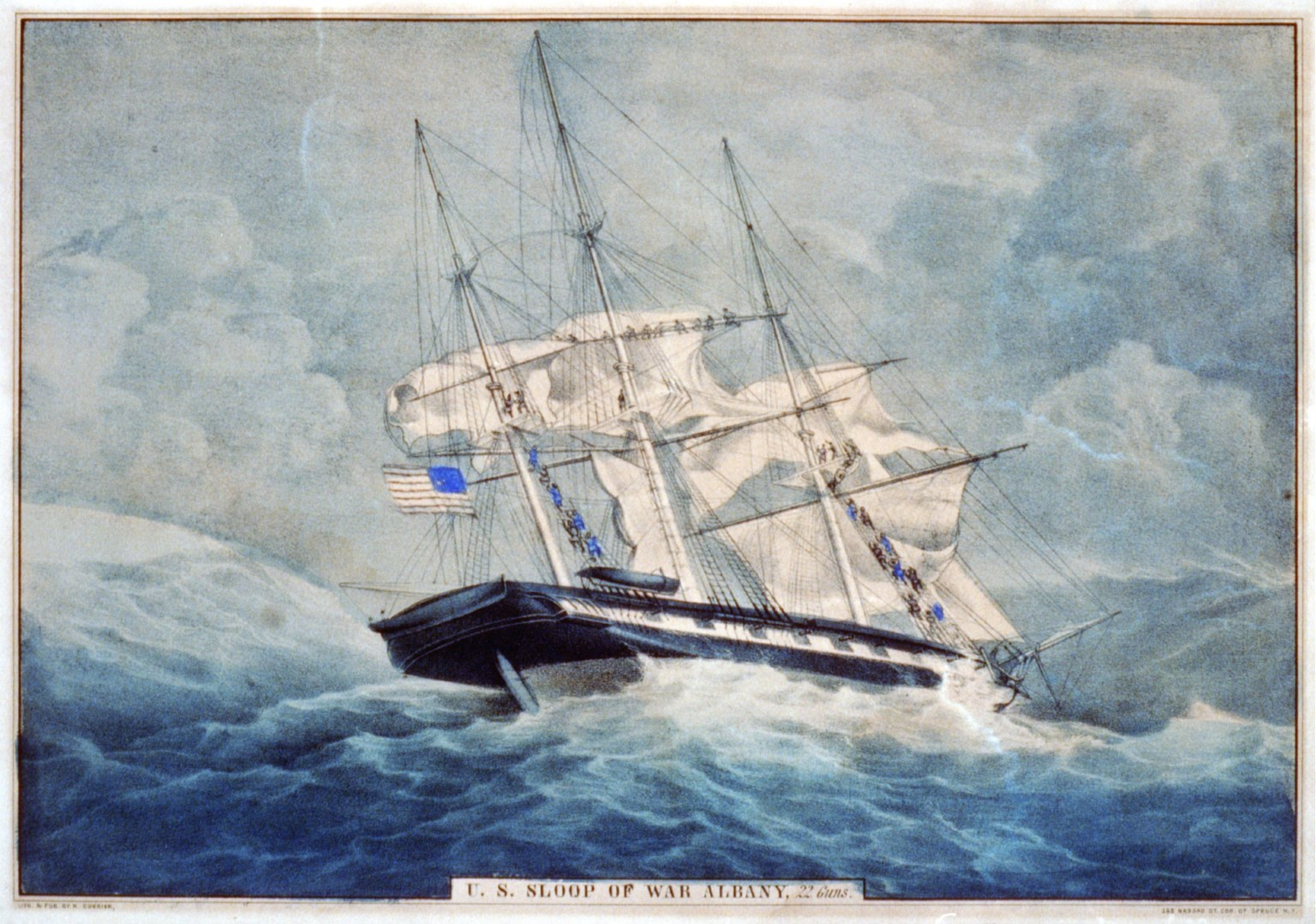
USS Albany, a sloop of the Home Station during the Mexican-American War.

=== Mexican–American War ===
During the Mexican–American War the ships of the Home Squadron, commanded by Commodore David Conner, USN fought in several engagements against Mexican forces. Many of the Home Squadron vessels were attached to vice commander Commodore Matthew C. Perry's Mosquito Fleet which was involved in the battles of Tuxpan, Tabasco, Villahermosa and Veracruz. No ship-to-ship combat occurred though several merchant vessels were captured, the Home Squadron primarily operated against Mexican coastal forts and artillery batteries.

=== Reform War ===
Since the Mexican War of Independence ending in 1821, Mexican liberals, a political party which evolved from the Masonic Lodge of the York Rite created by Joel R. Poinsett who was an American Diplomat sent by President James Monroe to secretly propose the purchase of the northern provinces from the First Mexican Empire; and the conservative party—which as its name indicates, had as its principal objective was to preserve the traditions and customs of the nation—were constantly in conflict at each other throughout the first decades of the existence of Mexico.

The continuous friction led to a major civil war known as the Reform War from 1858 to 1860 and political instability, which the U.S. government under James Buchanan saw as a great opportunity to further expand the U.S. territory limits southwards (after the acquisition through war of California, Arizona, New Mexico, Nevada, Utah, most of Colorado, south Wyoming, and a fraction of Kansas and Oklahoma. For this reason and based upon the Doctrine Monroe, the U.S government sent an emissary to discuss with Juarez's liberal party the possibility to cede the Baja California peninsula to the United States, which he promptly accepted in exchange of diplomatic, economic and military support to counteract the conservative power that at that point, had the full support of the majority of the Mexican people, and was in control of the entire country with the exception of the cities of Morelia and Veracruz.

During the second siege of Veracruz in 1859, a Mexican officer named Thomas M. Marin of the Mexican Navy purchased vessels in Cuba, that he armed and equipped to sail back to Veracruz to assist and supply General Miramon's siege of the held city. The Liberal Mexican government declared Marin's fleet to be that of pirates so ships of the Home Squadron were ordered to intervene and arrest Marin. Two of Marin's ships, the steamer General Miramon and the sloop-of-war Marquis of Havana, arrived at their rendezvous off Anton Lizardo. They were spotted by a Mexican fort and the frigate USS Savannah which ordered the sloop-of-war USS Saratoga to intervene with help from two steamers.

The American ships under Commander Thomas Turner approached and fired warning shots, the Mexicans obviously fired back as the American fleet had no jurisdiction within Mexican waters. Despite the fact of being outnumbered by the American fleet, the Mexican vessels engaged in battle resulting in a bloody encounter Battle of Anton Lizardo and the capture of the conservative ships and over thirty casualties on both sides. The battle played an important role in ending the Reform War with a liberal victory and the signatory of the secret MacLane-Ocampo Treaty where Juarez and the radical liberals agreed on further cessions of Mexican territory to the U.S., as well as a couple of transit concessions through the Tehuantepec Isthmus, and from Tamaulipas across Mexico to the Gulf of California in perpetuity to the U.S. that eventually was rejected by the American congress, as it was determined that the inclusion of these states into the American federation could strengthen the southern confederate states.

Due to the American intervention, the conservatives under General Miramon failed to take Veracruz from the liberals for a second time, which a few years later led Mexico to a French intervention.

=== Slave trade ===
Slavers seized by the Home Squadron:

Vessel	Captor	Date	Location
Putnam	Dolphin	21 August 1858	Cuba
Cygnet	Mohawk	18 November 1859	Cuba
Wildfire	Mohawk	26 April 1860	Cuba
William	Wyandotte	9 May 1860	Cuba
Bogota	Crusader	23 May 1860	Cuba
W.R. Kibby	Crusader	23 July 1860	Cuba
Joven Antonio	Crusader	14 August 1860	Cuba
Toccoa	Mohawk	20 December 1860	Havana
Mary J. Kimball	Mohawk	21 December 1860	Havana

== Commanders ==
- Commodore Charles Stewart 20 Jan 1842 - 21 Dec 1843
- Commodore David Conner 1 Jan 1844 – 19 Apr 1847
- Commodore Matthew C. Perry 15 Mar 1847 – 21 Nov 1848
- Commodore Jesse Wilkinson 20 Nov 1848 - 6 Mar 1849
- Commodore Foxhall A. Parker, Sr. 5 Apr 1849 - 14 Jun 1852
- Commodore John Thomas Newton 15 Jul 1852 – 2 Apr 1855
- Commodore Charles Stewart McCauley 3 Apr 1855 – 5 Jul 1856
- Commodore Hiram Paulding 30 Jun 1856 – 19 Mar 1858
- Commodore James Mc. McIntosh 19 Mar 1858 - 18 Jan 1859
- Commodore William J. McCluney 1 Feb 1859 – 13 May 1860
- Commodore Joseph R. Jarvis 16 Jun 1860 - 16 Nov 1860
- Commodore Garrett J. Pendergrast 19 Oct 1860 – 10 Apr 1861
- Commodore Silas H. Stringham 11 Apr 1861 - 4 May 1861
