= Thomas Turner (naval officer) =

American Navy admiral (1807–1883)

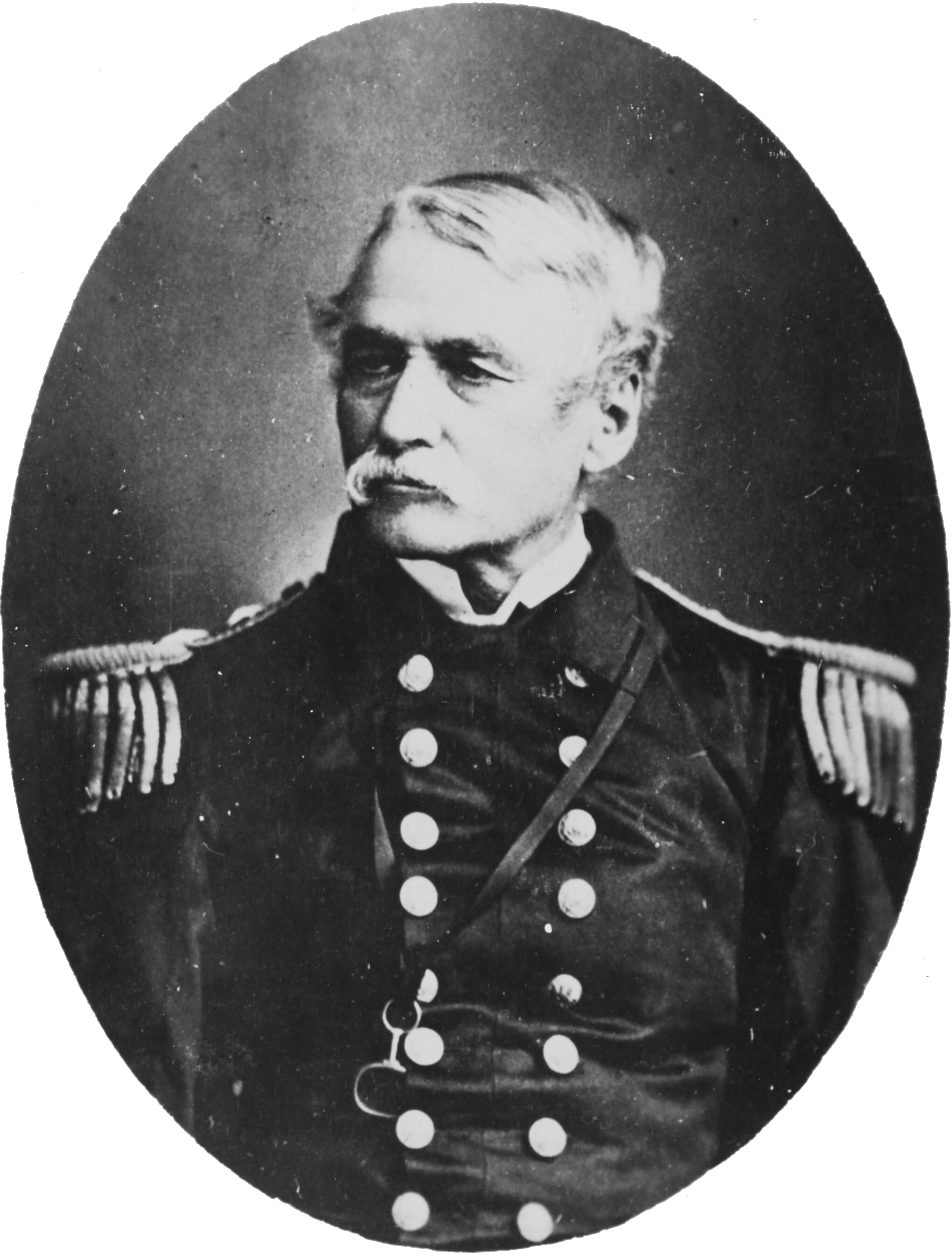
- Born: 23 December 1807; King George County, Virginia
- Died: 24 March 1883 (aged 75) Glen Mills, Pennsylvania
- Allegiance: United States of America
- Branch: United States Navy; Union Navy
- Service years: 1825–1870
- Rank: Rear Admiral
- Commands: Pacific Squadron; South Pacific Squadron; USS New Ironsides; USS Saratoga; USS Fredonia; USS Reefer
- Conflicts: Second Sumatran Expedition; Mexican–American War; Reform War; American Civil War
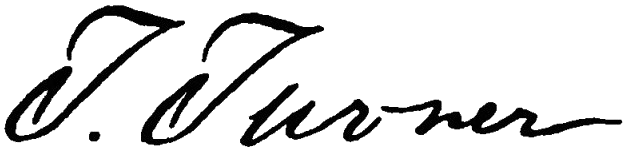
- Signature

Thomas Turner (23 December 1807 – 24 March 1883) was a United States Navy rear admiral. He served as commander of the Pacific Squadron from 1869 to 1870. Turner fought in the Mexican–American War and, though a Virginian, served in the Union Navy during the American Civil War.

== Biography ==
Turner was born at the Marengo plantation in King George County, Virginia in 1807 and raised at the Kinloch plantation in Fauquier County. He was appointed to the U.S. Navy as a midshipman on 21 April 1825. Turner received his training at sea attached to the Mediterranean Squadron, joining the frigate USS Constellation in 1827 and the sloop-of-war USS Warren in 1830. He became a passed midshipman on 4 June 1831.

Remaining with the Mediterranean Squadron, Turner rejoined the Constellation in 1834 and then was reassigned to the frigate USS Delaware in 1835. He was promoted to lieutenant on 22 December 1835. From 1837 to 1838, Turner served aboard the frigate USS Macedonian in the West Indies Squadron. From 1838 to 1841, he was assigned to the frigate USS Columbia in the East India Squadron, participating in the Second Sumatran expedition.

In 1843, Turner was assigned to the receiving ship at the Philadelphia Navy Yard. During the Mexican–American War, he was deployed with the Home Squadron. In April 1847, Turner commanded the schooner USS Reefer during the First Battle of Tuxpan. From June to October 1847, he commanded the stores ship USS Fredonia. Turner was then reassigned to the sloop-of-war USS Albany. In 1850, he returned to the receiving ship at the Philadelphia Navy Yard.

From 1851 to 1853, Turner served aboard the frigate USS Congress in the Brazil Squadron. On 14 September 1855, he was promoted to commander. From 1858 to 1860, Turner served as the commanding officer of the sloop-of-war USS Saratoga. In March 1860, he participated in the Battle of Antón Lizardo at Veracruz, capturing the steamers Marques de Habana and General Miramón.

Though born and raised in Virginia and a first cousin once removed of Robert E. Lee, Turner remained loyal to the Union during the Civil War. He was promoted to captain on 16 July 1862 and then to commodore on 13 December 1862. Turner was given command of the armored frigate USS New Ironsides and commended by Rear Adm. Samuel F. Du Pont for his actions during the First Battle of Charleston Harbor in April 1863. He was assigned to special duty at New York City in 1864 and then at Philadelphia in 1866.

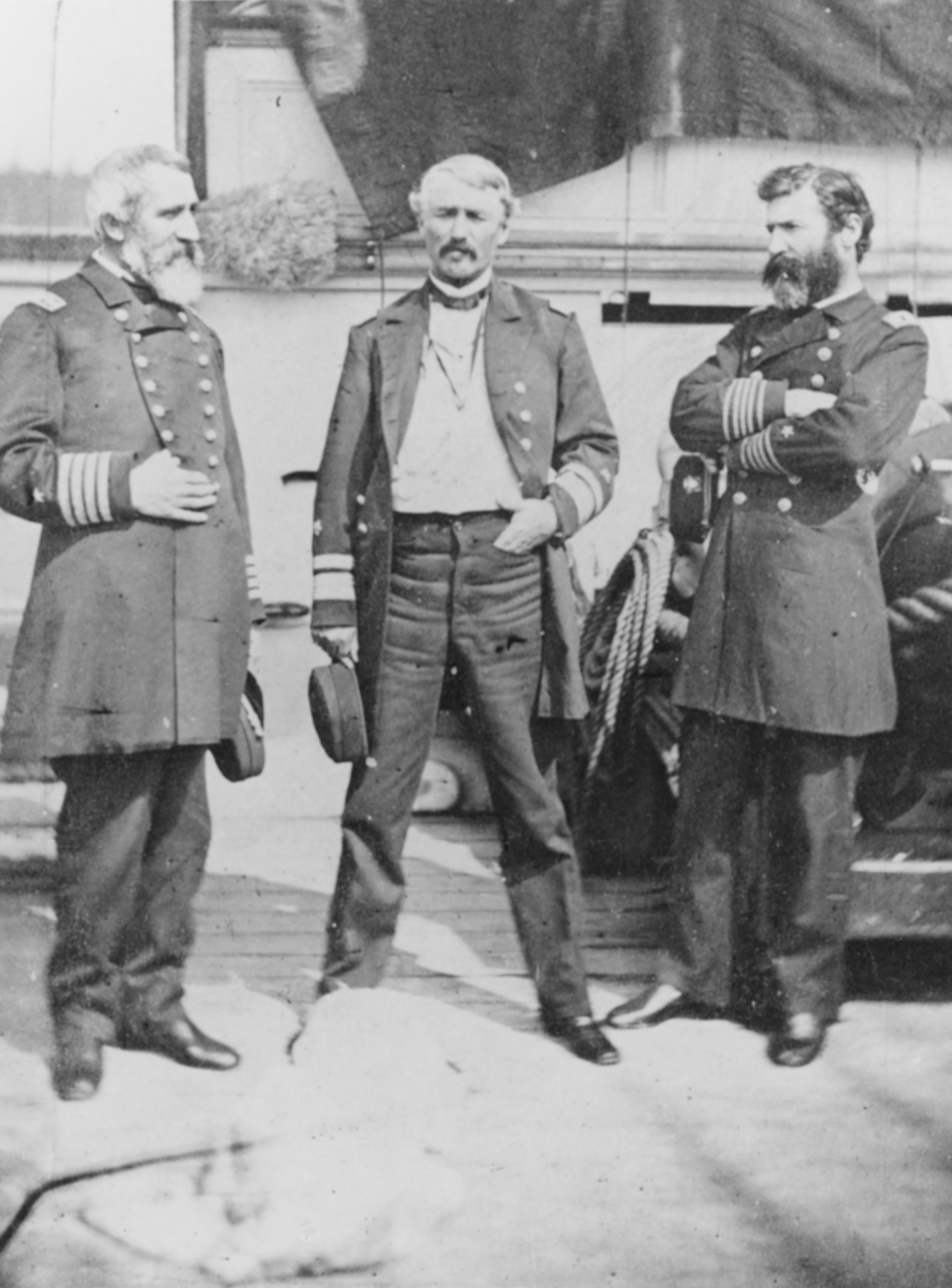
With Capt. George H. Preble and Cmdr. Philip C. Johnson Jr. in August 1869

Turner was promoted to rear admiral effective 27 May 1868. He served as commander of the South Pacific Squadron from 1868 to 1869. Turner's ships provided aid after the August 1868 Arica, Peru earthquake in present-day Chile. In June 1869, he assumed full command of the entire Pacific Squadron. Turner retired from active duty on 21 April 1870 after forty-five years of military service.

== Personal ==
Turner was the son of Thomas Turner IV and Elizabeth Carter "Eliza" (Randolph) Turner. His father was a planter who served in the Virginia General Assembly. His mother was a first cousin of Robert E. Lee. Thomas and his sister Marietta served as groomsman and bridesmaid at Lee's June 1831 wedding.

Thomas Turner's younger brother Henry Smith Turner (1 April 1811 – 16 December 1881) was an 1834 graduate of the United States Military Academy. He accompanied and helped document Stephen W. Kearny's 1845–1847 expedition to the Rocky Mountains, California and New Mexico. Capt. Henry S. Turner was wounded at the Battle of San Pasqual in December 1846 and brevetted major for gallant and meritorious conduct at the Battles of San Pasqual, Río San Gabriel and La Mesa. He left military service in July 1848 and settled in Missouri, becoming a banker and serving in the state House of Representatives (1858–1859) and on the St. Louis common council.

On 1 June 1836, Thomas Turner married Frances Hales "Fanny" Palmer in Philadelphia. The officiant at the ceremony was Episcopal bishop William White. His wife's older brother was naval officer James Shedden Palmer. Turner and his wife had eight children.

After his retirement, Turner and his wife settled in Philadelphia. They later moved to nearby Glen Mills, Pennsylvania, where he died in 1883. His remains were interred at the Evergreen Cemetery in Union County, New Jersey.
