= USS Case (DD-370) =

Mahan-class destroyer

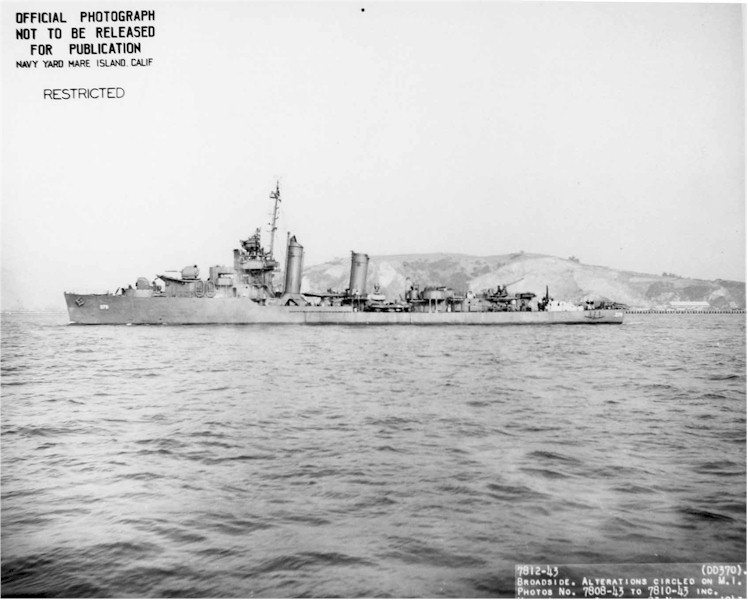
- Case steaming off Mare Island on 23 November 1943

History

United States
- Namesake: Augustus Ludlow Case
- Builder: Boston Navy Yard
- Launched: 14 September 1935
- Commissioned: 15 September 1936
- Decommissioned: 13 December 1945
- Fate: Sold 31 December 1947

General characteristics
- Class & type: Mahan-class destroyer
- Displacement: 1,500 tons
- Length: 341 ft 4 in (104 m)
- Beam: 35 ft (10,7 m)
- Draft: 9 ft 10 in (2,8 m)
- Speed: 37 knots
- Complement: 158 officers and crew
- Armament: 5 x 5 in (130 mm) guns, 12 x 21 inch (533 mm) torpedo tubes

USS Case (DD-370) was a Mahan-class destroyer in the United States Navy before and during World War II. She was the second ship named for Augustus Ludlow Case. Case was berthed at Pearl Harbor when the Japanese struck on 7 December 1941, then served in the United States Pacific Fleet until the end of World War II.

== Construction and commissioning ==
Case was launched at the Boston Navy Yard in Boston, Massachusetts, on 14 September 1935, sponsored by Miss. M. R. Case, and commissioned on 15 September 1936.

== Service history ==
Case joined in fleet problems in the Hawaiian area, and in 1938, served as school ship at San Diego, California. From this, her home port, she carried midshipmen on an Alaskan cruise in summer 1939, and in April 1940 returned to Pearl Harbor to take part in a fleet problem which found her sailing to Midway, Johnston Island, and Palmyra Island. Between February and April 1941, she cruised to Samoa, Tahiti, and Auckland, New Zealand.

=== Pearl Harbor ===
Case was in a nest of destroyers at Pearl Harbor Navy Yard on 7 December 1941 during the attack on Pearl Harbor. From 7 December until 23 May 1942, Case escorted convoys passing between the United States West Coast and Pearl Harbor.

=== Patrols ===
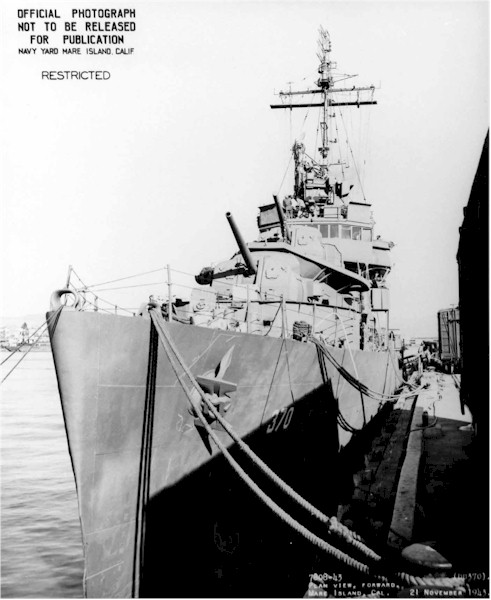
Case at Mare Island on 21 November 1943

From 31 May to 7 August 1942, Case patrolled and carried out the usual varied destroyer assignments off Kodiak, Alaska. On 7 August, she unleashed her guns in the pre-invasion bombardment of Kiska and on an enemy tanker with undetermined results. Case continued on patrol off Adak until mid-October, when she escorted shipping to Pearl Harbor, then proceeded to the States for overhaul.

Returning to Pearl Harbor in late November 1942, Case cleared to escort a convoy to the Fiji Islands, arriving 20 December. From Fiji she sailed to Guadalcanal to screen a convoy during its unloading period, and on 1 January 1943, arrived at Espiritu Santo, her base for escort, patrol, and training duty through 23 September. After overhaul at San Francisco, California, Case returned to Pearl Harbor in December.

For the next eight months, Case was almost constantly at sea, screening groups of the 3rd and 5th Fleets. From mid-January through mid-March 1944, these strikes were against Japanese bases in the Marshall Islands, supporting the invasion of these islands. Palau and the western Carolines were the targets 30 March-1 April, and Case next sailed from Majuro for the late-April air raids on Hollandia, Truk, Satawan, and Ponape. A month of local screening and escort duty at Majuro preceded Case's assignment to TG 58.4 for the strikes on Japanese airfields in the Bonins, designed to neutralize these bases during the invasion of the Marianas. With this group, she screened carriers in the historic Battle of the Philippine Sea on 19 and 20 June.

=== Repairs ===
After a repair period at Eniwetok, Case resumed her operations with TG 58.4, screening for air strikes preparing for the landings on Guam late in July 1944, and the attacks on the Bonins on 4 and 5 August. Through mid-September, Case served on inter-island escort duty in the Marianas. In September, she rendezvoused with two submarines carrying allied prisoners of war, many of them wounded, rescued after the sinking of a Japanese transport. Since rough seas prevented the submarines from transferring the wounded to Case, the destroyer put medical officers on board the submarines.

Case participated in the bombardment of Marcus Island on 9 October 1944 and then joined TG 38.1 for strikes on Luzon in conjunction with the invasion of Leyte from 18 to 23 October. She returned to Ulithi 29 October, putting to sea again 8 November for the bombardment of Iwo Jima on the night of 11/12 November.

Resuming escort duty from Ulithi, Case was screening cruisers bound for Saipan on 20 November, when she rammed and sank a Japanese midget submarine at the entrance to Mugai Channel. Immediately, she put back to Ulithi for an inspection of damage incurred in the encounter, but was back in action just two days later, bound for off shore patrol at Saipan until 6 December.

=== Iwo Jima ===
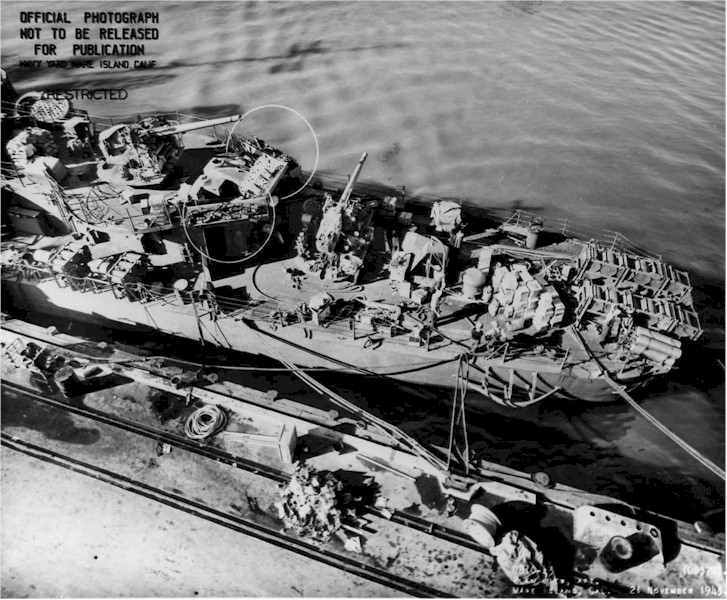
Case's stern, showing the rear 5-inch guns

Case joined in a smashing bombardment of Iwo Jima once more on 24 December 1944, during which she and Roe were dispatched to attack a fleeing Japanese transport. A two-hour chase at full speed followed, both destroyers firing as the range closed. At 15:59, the effect of accurate gunfire told as the transport sank, her survivors refusing any assistance from the American destroyers. After repairs at Saipan, she returned to Iwo Jima 24 and 25 January 1945 for antisubmarine patrol during the opening phases of operations ashore. Escort and patrol duty from Saipan occupied her until 19 March, when she began an extended period of antisubmarine patrol, air-sea rescue, and radar picket duty between Saipan and Iwo Jima until the close of the war in August 1945.

At 13:50 on 31 March 1945, Case departed her air-sea rescue station to investigate a surface contact reported by a patrol aircraft at 29°20′N 136°31′E. At 19:51, she sighted a submarine on the surface in the Philippine Sea 425 nautical miles (787 km; 489 mi) southeast of Kagoshima, Kyushu, Japan at 29°14′N 137°18′E which did not respond to recognition signals. At 20:09, Case opened gunfire on the submarine at a range of 5,500 yards (5,000 m). She fired fifteen 5-inch (127 mm) rounds, scoring no hits but straddling the submarine's conning tower with her third salvo as it crash-dived. After the submarine submerged to a depth of 450 feet (137 m), Case exchanged recognition signals with it identifying it as friendly, and Case suspended her attack and headed for Iwo Jima at 20:29. The submarine, USS Spot (SS-413), suffered no damage or casualties.

=== Surrender of the Bonin Islands ===
On 2 September 1945, the Case sailed to Chichi Jima to accept and supervise the surrender of the Bonins Islands. On 19 September 1945, she took departure from Iwo Jima for Norfolk, Virginia, arriving 1 November 1945. Here, she was decommissioned 13 December 1945, and sold 31 December 1947.

== Awards ==
Case received seven battle stars for World War II service.
