= Heroica Escuela Naval Militar =

Mexican Navy's Officer Training School

Coordinates: 19.0584°N 95.9835°W

- Type: Military college
- Established: 1897
- Location: Antón Lizardo, Veracruz, Mexico
- Website: Escuela Naval Militar

Heroica Escuela Naval Militar

An historic crest displaying the school's motto "El que ha de reprender debe ser irreprensible"{"He who is to rebuke must be blameless")

The Heroica Escuela Naval Militar is the officer training academy of the Mexican Navy.

It began operations on 1 June 1897 with a group of cadets from the Mexican Army's Colegio Militar who had expressed an interest in training as naval officers. It was originally located on the premises of the military garrison in Veracruz. Its original staff comprised one commandant (Captain Juan Antonio Bernal of the Navy), two officers and six teachers, with 26 cadets.

It was given the appellation Heroica ("Heroic") for its efforts in defending the port during the 1914 United States occupation of Veracruz.

On 11 November 1952, the Academy moved to new premises in Antón Lizardo, Veracruz

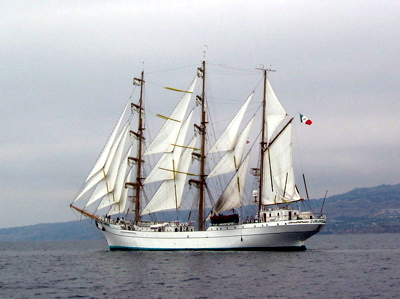
ARM Cuauhtémoc

Before graduating, final year cadets take an instructional journey on the ARM Cuauhtémoc. Since 2008, the school has accepted female cadets of the service branches.

Currently, all graduates earn a Bachelor of Science degree with a major in engineering. There are six available concentrations: naval systems (general corps), Hydraulic engineering (marine infantry), naval mechanical engineering, engineering in electronics and naval communications, aeronaval engineering and logistics engineering.
