= USS Case (DD-285) =

Clemson-class destroyer

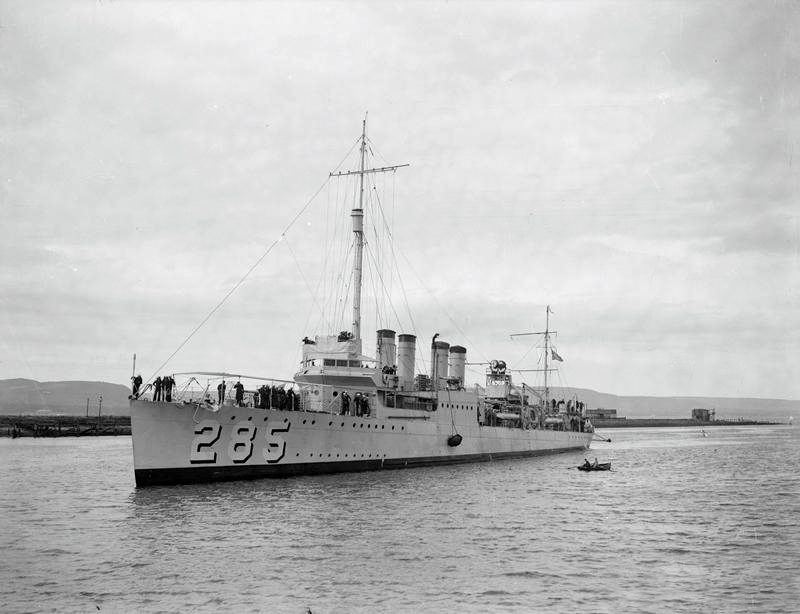
- Case in 1926

History

United States
- Namesake: Augustus Case
- Builder: Bethlehem Shipbuilding Corporation, Squantum Victory Yard
- Laid down: 3 June 1919
- Launched: 21 September 1919
- Commissioned: 8 December 1919
- Decommissioned: 22 October 1930
- Stricken: 22 October 1930
- Identification: code letters: NUNX
- Fate: Sold for scrapping, 17 January 1931

General characteristics
- Class & type: Clemson-class destroyer
- Displacement: 1,290 long tons (1,311 t) (standard); 1,389 long tons (1,411 t) (deep load)
- Length: 314 ft 4 in (95.8 m)
- Beam: 30 ft 11 in (9.42 m)
- Draught: 10 ft 3 in (3.1 m)
- Installed power: 27,000 shp (20,000 kW); 4 water-tube boilers
- Propulsion: 2 shafts, 2 steam turbines
- Speed: 35 knots (65 km/h; 40 mph) (design)
- Range: 2,500 nautical miles (4,600 km; 2,900 mi) at 20 knots (37 km/h; 23 mph) (design)
- Complement: 6 officers, 108 enlisted men
- Armament: 4 × single 4-inch (102 mm) guns; 2 × single 1-pounder AA guns or; 2 × single 3-inch (76 mm) guns; 4 × triple 21 inch (533 mm) torpedo tubes; 2 × depth charge rails

USS Case (DD-285) was a Clemson-class destroyer in service with the United States Navy from 1919 to 1930. She was scrapped in 1931.

== Description ==
The Clemson class was a repeat of the preceding Wickes class although more fuel capacity was added. The ships displaced 1,290 long tons (1,311 t) at standard load and 1,389 long tons (1,411 t) at deep load. They had an overall length of 314 feet 4 inches (95.8 m), a beam of 30 feet 11 inches (9.4 m) and a draught of 10 feet 3 inches (3.1 m). They had a crew of 6 officers and 108 enlisted men.

Performance differed radically between the ships of the class, often due to poor workmanship. The Clemson class was powered by two steam turbines, each driving one propeller shaft, using steam provided by four water-tube boilers. The turbines were designed to produce a total of 27,000 shaft horsepower (20,000 kW) intended to reach a speed of 35 knots (65 km/h; 40 mph). The ships carried a maximum of 371 long tons (377 t) of fuel oil which was intended gave them a range of 2,500 nautical miles (4,600 km; 2,900 mi) at 20 knots (37 km/h; 23 mph).

The ships were armed with four 4-inch (102 mm) guns in single mounts and were fitted with two 1-pounder guns for anti-aircraft defense. In many ships a shortage of 1-pounders caused them to be replaced by 3-inch (76 mm) guns. Their primary weapon, though, was their torpedo battery of a dozen 21 inch (533 mm) torpedo tubes in four triple mounts. They also carried a pair of depth charge rails. A "Y-gun" depth charge thrower was added to many ships.

== Construction and career ==
Case, named for Augustus Case, was launched 21 September 1919 by Bethlehem Shipbuilding Corporation, Squantum, Massachusetts; sponsored by Miss A. R. Case; commissioned 8 December 1919 and reported to Destroyer Division 43, Atlantic Fleet.

Between January and July 1920, Case operated along the east coast, and on winter maneuvers in the Caribbean, during which she obtained tactical data for Naval War College study. From July 1920 through December 1921, she operated in reduced commission with fifty per cent of complement. Beginning in December 1921, Case was permanently assigned to Destroyer Division 25 for a regular schedule of operations designed to keep her operational readiness at its maximum. Along with gunnery and engineering exercises and competitions, she joined the fleet annually in maneuvers and war problems.

From 1924 to 1925, Case was flagship of her division, and With it in April 1926 sailed to the European station, where the flag was shown and good-will created by visits to various British and Mediterranean ports. Returning to the United States a year later, the destroyer resumed operations along the east coast and in the Caribbean. Designated for scrapping in accordance with the London Naval Treaty in 1929, Case was decommissioned at Philadelphia 22 October 1930, and sold as a stripped hulk 17 January 1931.
