= William H. Aspinwall (pilot boat) =

Sandy Hook Pilot boat

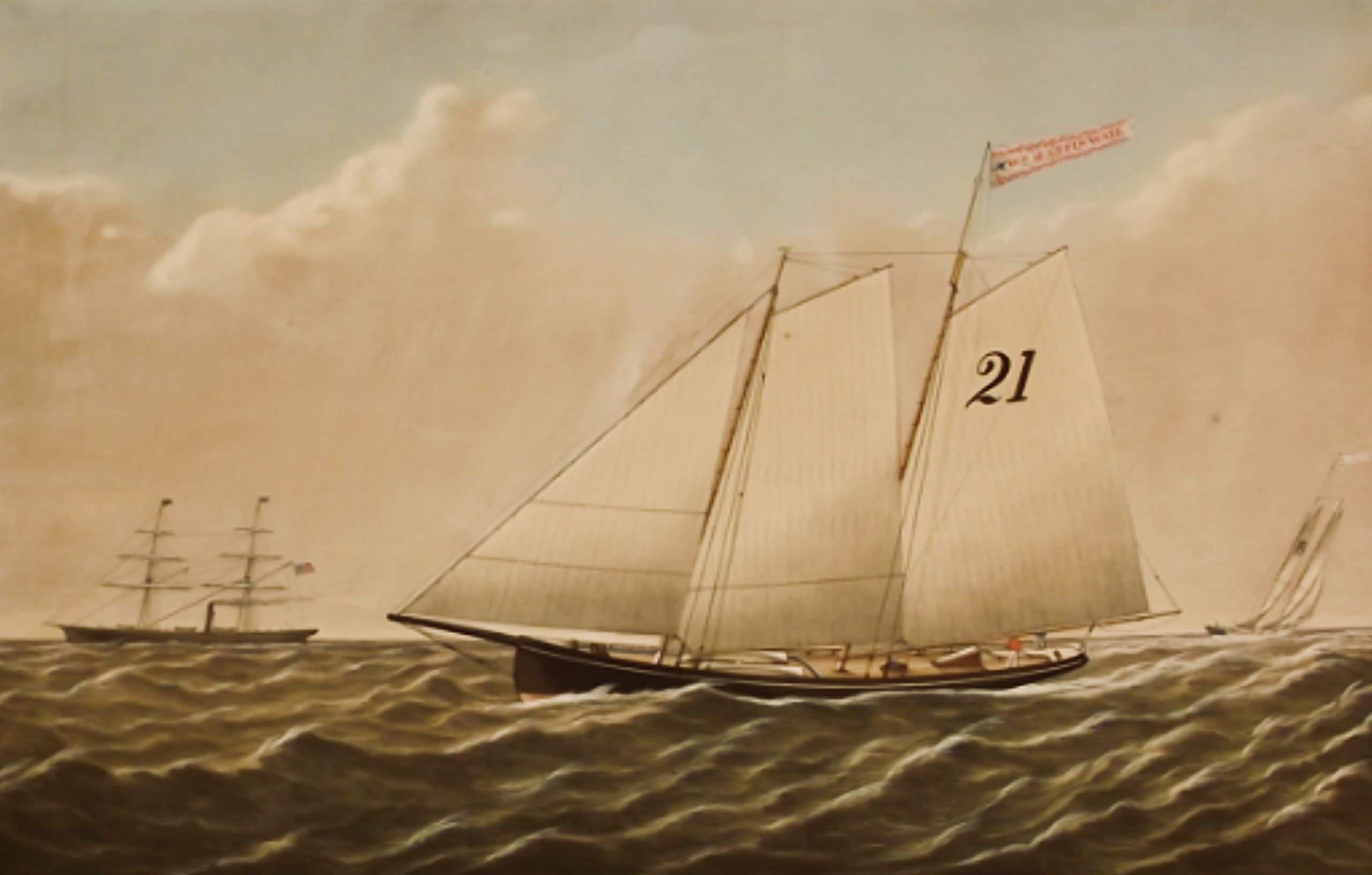
- William H. Aspinwall Pilot Boat, No. 21.

History

United States
- Name: William H. Aspinwall (1807-1875)
- Namesake: William Henry Aspinwall, American businessman
- Owner: Captain Dale; Henry L. Weaver; John Shooks; James Callahan; Walter Brewer
- Operator: Captain Walter Brewer
- Builder: J. B. Van Dusen Bros. shipyard
- Cost: $10,000
- Launched: January 30, 1861
- Out of service: April 20, 1880
- Fate: Wreck (1880)

General characteristics
- Class & type: schooner
- Tonnage: 46-tons TM
- Propulsion: Sail

The William H. Aspinwall was a 19th-century Sandy Hook pilot boat built in 1861 and launched from the J.B & J.D. Van Deusen shipyard at East River for New York Pilots. She was a replacement for the former pilot boat Virginia. In 1880, the Aspinwall was caught in a thick fog and went ashore at the Long Island bar and became a total loss. She was replaced by a new pilot boat, the America, No. 21.

== Construction and service ==
On January 30, 1861, the pilot boat William H. Aspinwall, No 21, was launched from the J. B. Van Dusen Bros. shipyard at the foot of Sixteenth street, East River. She was a replacement for the former pilot boat Virginia. Her owners were Mrs. Dale, Henry L. Weaver, John Shooks, and James Callahan. Captain Walter Brewer was in command of the vessel. She was also referred to as the W. H. Aspinwall.

The William H. Aspinwall, was registered as a pilot schooner with the Record of American and Foreign Shipping, from 1877 to 1879. Her ship master was Captain Walter Brewer; her owners were the N. Y. Pilots; built in 1861 in New York; her hailing port was the Port of New York. Her dimensions were 46-tons Tonnage, 100-tons burthen.

The boat number "21" was painted as a large number on her mainsail, that identified her as belonging to the Sandy Hook pilots. In 1860, the W. H. Aspinwall was listed as No. 21, in the list of twenty-one New York pilot boats.

On April 10, 1869, the pilot boat William H. Aspinwall, No. 21 and Captain Walter Brewer spoke to the British steamship Prairie Bird. They transferred five men to the pilot boat and brought them to New York City. The men were on the steamship Thames, which had caught on fire and were in need of rescue.

On February 15, 1874, pilots Charles Cummiskey, John Shooks, and William Germond, were on the pilot boat William H. Aspinwall, No 21, 45 miles from Barnegat, when they came across the yacht Anita of Gravesend, that had been in a snow storm. The pilots helped pump out the water from her bilge, provided provisions, and towed her into the harbor.

== End of service ==
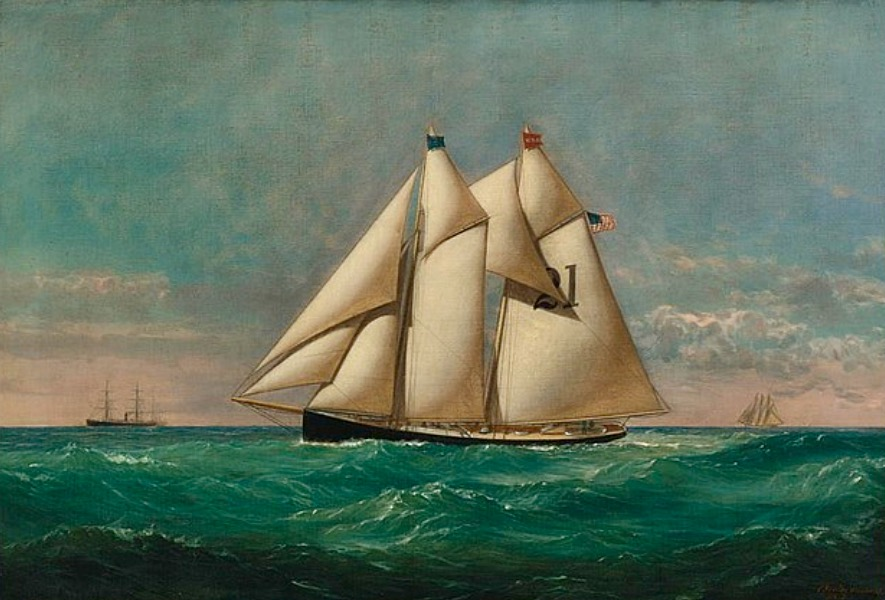
Pilot America, No 21.

On April 20, 1880, the 19 years old pilot schooner William H. Aspinwall, No. 21 of New York, was returning to port after all her pilots had boarded steamships when she was caught in a thick fog. She sailed one mile from the Fire Island Lighthouse and hit the outer Long Island bar. She was a total loss. A lifesaving crew reached the boat and rescued the pilot crew. Captain Walter Brewer commanded the lost boat and was part owner. She was valued at $10,000, but was not insured.

On October 25, 1880, a new pilot boat, the America, No. 21, replaced the William H. Aspinwall, No. 21, due to her loss in April 1880.

== See also ==
- List of Northeastern U. S. Pilot Boats
