= Battle of Antón Lizardo =

1860 naval engagement in Mexico's Reform War

- Part of the Reform War
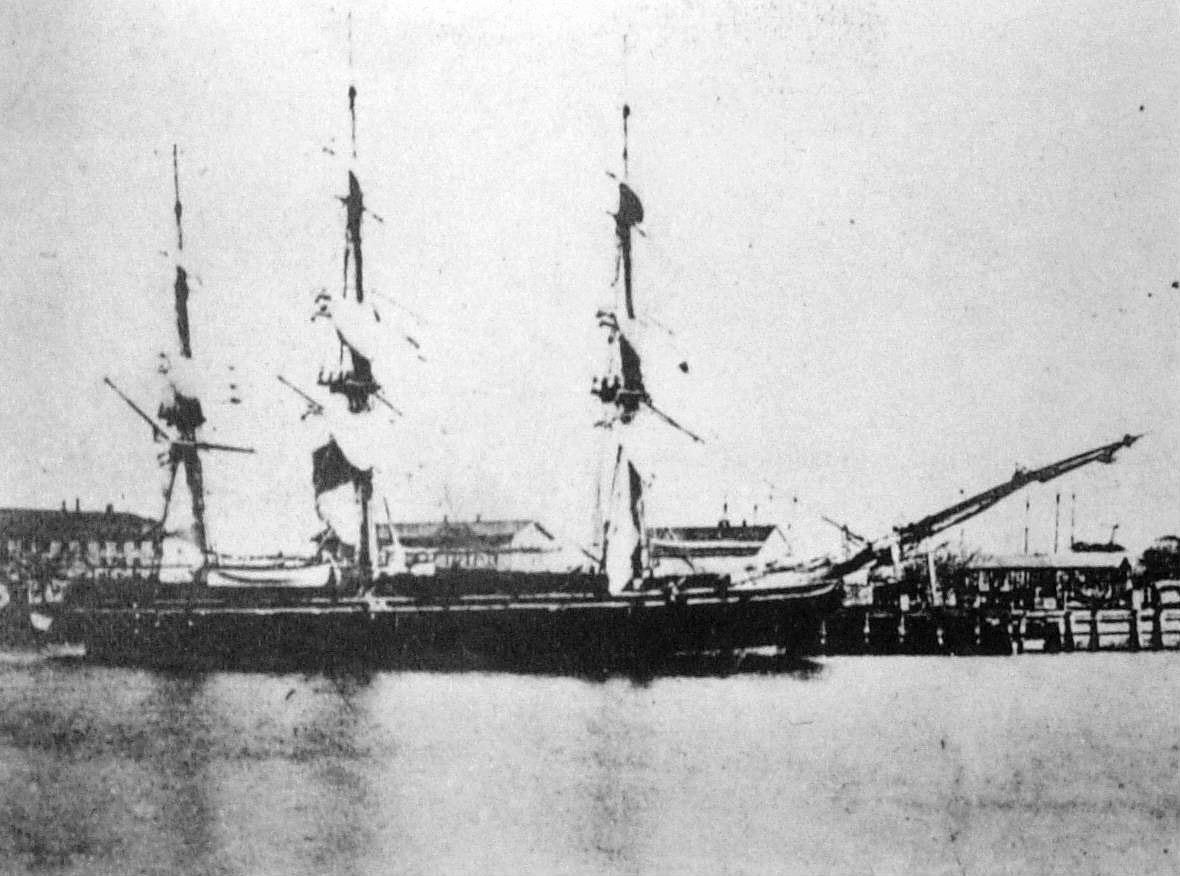
- USS Saratoga
Date	March 6, 1860
Location	off Antón Lizardo, Veracruz, Mexico, Gulf of Mexico
Result	United States/Liberal victory

Belligerents
United States; Mexico Liberals	Spain; Mexico Conservatives

Commanders and leaders
Thomas Turner	(Mexico) Tomás Marín Sabalza

Strength
1 sloop-of-war 2 steamers 280 crew: U.S. Navy; U.S. Army; U.S. Marines	1 sloop-of-war 1 steamer Unknown number of crew: Mexican Navy -Mexican Marines

Casualties and losses
1 killed 3 wounded 1 sloop-of-war damaged 1 steamer damaged	~30 wounded 1 sloop-of-war captured 1 steamer grounded

The Battle of Antón Lizardo was a naval engagement of Mexico's Reform War, a civil war between liberals and conservative governments. It took place off the Gulf Coast town of Antón Lizardo, Veracruz, in 1860. A Mexican Navy officer, Rear Admiral Tomás Marín Sabalza, mutinied and escaped to Havana, Cuba. There he formed a squadron of armed vessels to attack merchant ships and blockade Veracruz. The liberal government of Benito Juárez declared Tomás Marín a pirate and permitted foreign navies to attack his ships. Juárez's government was supported by the United States and its navy already had several vessels patrolling in the Gulf of Mexico.

== Background ==
After the mutiny and passage to Havana, where Spanish colonial military forces in Cuba granted him safety, Tomás Marín Sabalza began purchasing small steamships to convert for war. Marín's sympathies were in line with the conservative government of President General Miguel Miramón who at that time were fighting the liberal government forces of Veracruz, Veracruz. Tomás Marín hoped to acquire ships, recruit sailors, and then sail them to Veracruz to begin operating in the region. He was also to transport 4,000 muskets and artillery shells to resupply the conservative army. Many men under Marín were sailors he had mutinied with, others were recruited Cubans. In mid February, by the time the mutineers and Cubans left for the Mexican coast, four steamers had been acquired and armed. Rear Admiral Marín's expedition included his flagship renamed General Miramón, the screw sloop Marquis of Havana or Marquis de la Havana, the Democracy, the Union and the Messic. General Miramón and Marquis of Havana were armed with one howitzer each. They did not all leave Cuba at the same time, so they were directed by Rear Admiral Marín to rendezvous with him off Antón Lizardo, where they would then sail to the Isla de Sacrificios.

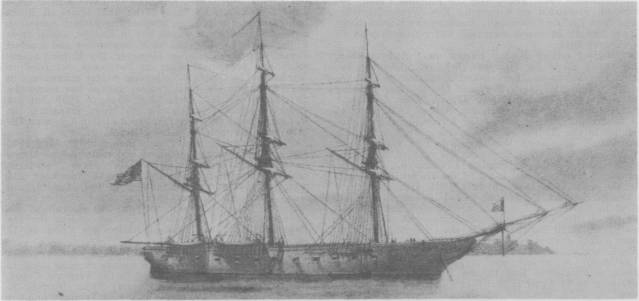
USS Savannah

General Miramón and Marquis of Havana arrived off Antón Lizardo north of the fortress of San Juan de Ulúa on March 6, 1860, where a United States Navy frigate was operating. The Mexican garrison of the fortress signaled Marín's ships to identify themselves, but the two steamers did nothing. It was then realized that the vessels were from the expedition so immediately the soldiers began strengthening their position. They also warned the nearby U.S. ship. USS Savannah signaled the ships, but once again no response was made. Her commander then sent for and issued orders to USS Saratoga to arrest Rear Admiral Marín, with the help of two chartered steamers. Only Saratoga was armed, the chartered steamers Wave and Indianola did not have guns but carried United States Navy sailors and United States Army troops. Indianola had a complement of eighty officers, crew members and soldiers. USS Saratoga was commanded by Commander Thomas Turner of the Home Squadron and was manned on average by 200 officers and men. She was armed with four 8-inch (200 mm) guns and eighteen 32-pounders. USS Savannah did not engage and never left anchorage, since she was apparently too slow to chase the targeted steamers. Mexican troops in the fortress were too far out of range and did not participate either.

== Battle ==
Saratoga and the steamers left their patrol at 8:30 at night on March 6. When they reached Antón Lizardo and the two anchored rebel ships it was almost midnight. The Mexican sailors sighted the American sloop-of-war and immediately began to flee towards Sacrificios. The U.S. ships closed range to within hailing distance and ordered the rebels to stop, these orders were ignored so Saratoga fired a warning shot. When this was also ignored, Saratoga fired four more warning shots. This time General Miramón replied by firing her howitzer into the pilot-house of Indianola. Not expecting resistance, the Americans were surprised but soon returned fire. Indianola then closed in to board General Miramón while her crew and the soldiers fired their muskets. In an attempt to avoid friendly fire, Commander Turner directed his men to change targets from Rear Admiral Marín's ship to the Marquis of Havana.

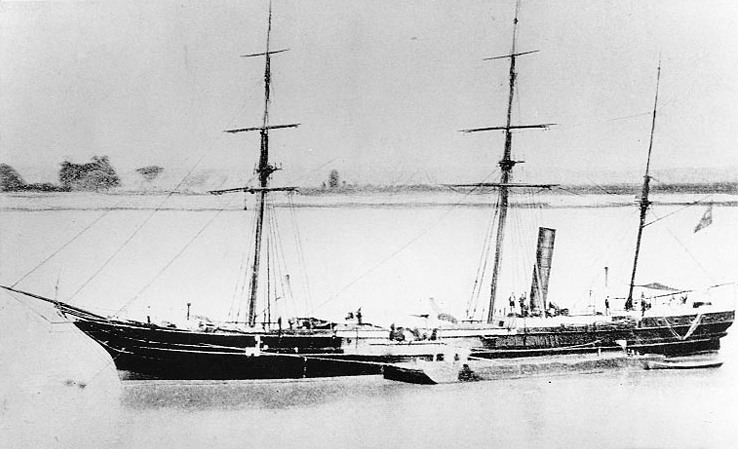
Marquis of Havana

Saratoga dueled with the Marquis of Havana for a moment and at least one shell hit the targeted ship, the shot blew a hole through the hull of the wooden steamer, apparently above the waterline. Marquis of Havana then surrendered by raising her colors, a Spanish flag, probably from Cuba. USS Saratoga captured her while Indianola and Wave chased General Miramón. Seeing that commander Marín was near escape, Saratoga joined in and quickly advanced with her big sails. Saratoga came alongside the General Miramón and Turner's crew boarded the vessel the hard way, without grappling hooks and not by means of launches. Marin's men fought off the first attempt at capture, so Saratoga tried again. At this point Marín was sailing through shallow waters and ran aground on a shoal. Saratoga drew close again, but the Mexicans chose not to resist any longer.

== Aftermath ==
Thirty wounded men were aboard the General Miramón when she was taken. An unknown number of Mexicans and Cubans were taken prisoner, the wounded were quickly removed to the Saratoga and received medical attention. In addition to about 4,000 rifles captured, Commander Turner's men took over 1,000 artillery shells from the Mexican vessels. The shells were much needed by conservative forces which had already failed one siege of Veracruz due to a lack of ammunition for their cannons. The battle played an important role in ending the Reform War with a liberal victory. Due to the loss of supplies, the conservatives under General Miramón failed to take Veracruz from the liberals for a second time. Soon after Miramón surrendered his army which ended the conventional phase of the war and started the guerrilla phase. The two United States steamers anchored for the night right at the wreck of General Miramón and both tried to free her of the shoal at 5:00 am. The salvage of Captain Marín's flagship failed, so the ships set sail for Veracruz. One U.S. sailor was killed in the battle, and another three were wounded. Both Saratoga and Indianola were slightly damaged. Tomás Marín Sabalza, the mutineers and their Cuban allies were handed over to the Mexican authorities at Veracruz. Marquis of Havana eventually ended up in Confederate States Navy service during the American Civil War and was renamed CSS McRae. Commander Turner later served with distinction as a commodore during the Battle of Charleston Harbor and was awarded the rank of rear admiral.

== See also ==
- First Battle of Topolobampo
