= First siege of Veracruz =

1859 siege in the Mexican Reform War

- Part of the Reform War
Date	February 16 – March 31, 1859 (1 month, 2 weeks and 1 day)
Location	Veracruz, Veracruz, Mexico
Result	Liberal victory

Belligerents
(Mexico) Conservatives	(Mexico) Liberals

Commanders and leaders
(Mexico) Miguel Miramón	(Mexico) Benito Juárez

The first siege of Veracruz was a military encounter of the Reform War which took place around Veracruz, Mexico, in 1859. Conservative President Miguel Miramón attempted to besiege the Liberal capital, Veracruz, but was slowed by guerrilla attacks and forced to withdraw when he received news that a Liberal army was marching on Mexico City. Miramon would try again one year later with similar results in the second siege of Veracruz.
