= USS Reefer =

1850s American military schooner, active in the Mexican–American War

History

United States
- Name: USS Reefer
- Builder: Brown and Bell; New York, New York
- Acquired: May 25, 1846
- Commissioned: June 19, 1846
- Decommissioned: 1848
- Fate: Sold at New York in 1848

General characteristics
- Type: Schooner
- Displacement: 76.5 short tons (69.4 t)
- Length: 59 ft (18 m)
- Beam: 19 ft (5.8 m)
- Draft: 6 ft (1.8 m)
- Propulsion: Sail
- Complement: 40 officers and enlisted
- Armament: 1 × 18 pdr (8.2 kg); or; 1 × 32 pdr (15 kg) gun

USS Reefer, was a pilot schooner purchased by the United States Navy at New York City on May 25, 1846, from shipbuilders Brown & Bell for service as a dispatch boat in Commodore David Conner's Home Squadron during the Mexican–American War.

== Service history ==
The Reefer was commissioned on June 19, 1846, Lieutenant Isaac Sterrett in command.

The schooner reached Veracruz on July 10, 1846, and began blockade duty south of that port. Early in August, she participated in an expedition against Alvarado, a river port some 30 miles from Veracruz, which sheltered a number of Mexican gunboats. However, the strong current prevented the American vessels from effecting the planned landing. Another attempt was made against Alvarado on October 15, 1846, but was again abortive. In this second attack upon the Mexican port a shell hit Reefer near her rudder head but did not damage her seriously.

On October 16, 1846, Reefer got underway with a task force commanded by Commodore Matthew C. Perry, but, on the 17th, she was separated from her consorts in a severe storm and missed participating in the expedition up the Tabasco River. The occupation of Tampico came in mid-November for the schooner as she became station ship at that port. In March 1847, she was part of the force which captured Veracruz.

After the fall of that important port, the American squadron occupied other Mexican ports along the gulf coast. Alvarado and Tuxpan fell in April, and in June Frontera and Tabasco came into American hands ending the fighting on the Mexican east coast. Thereafter, Reefer and her sister ships settled down to blockade duty and maintained both water lines of supply and communication for the Army.

== Post war ==
After the war ended, the Reefer was sold at New York in 1848.
