= USS Mohawk (1858) =

Gunboat of the United States Navy

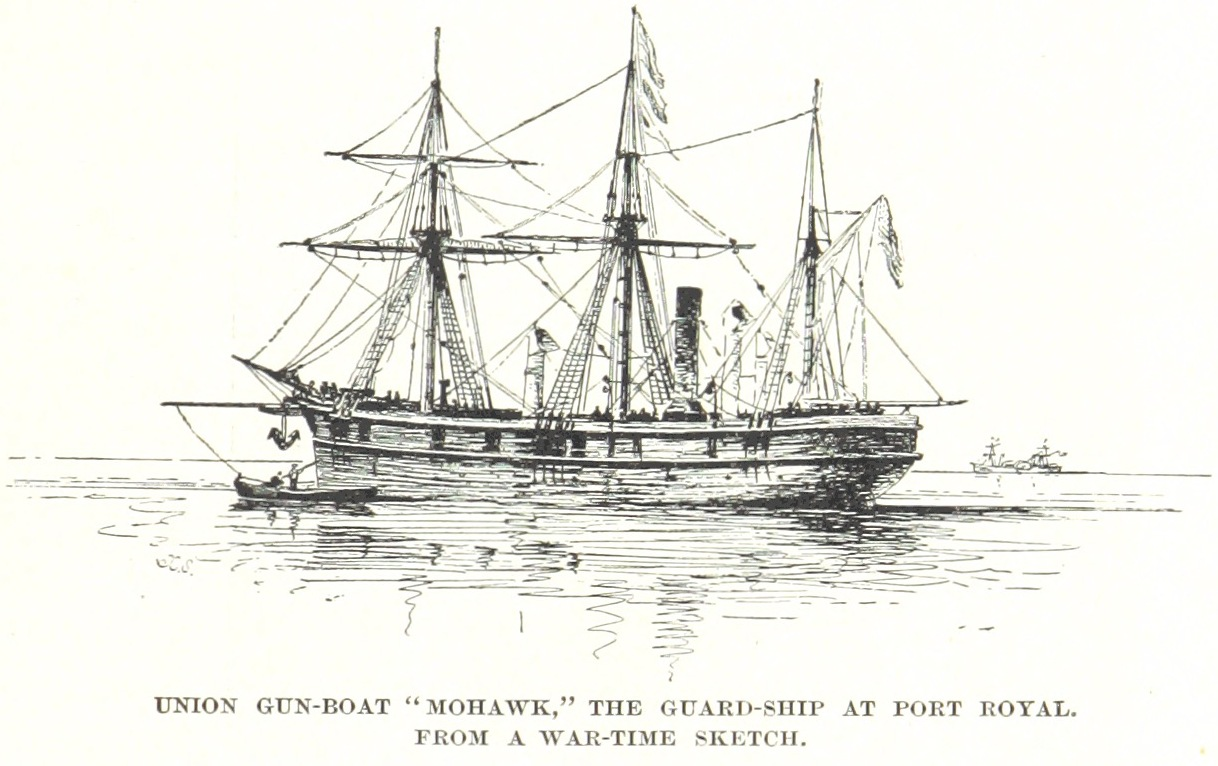

History

United States
- Launched: 11 June 1853
- Acquired: 14 June 1859
- Commissioned: 19 September 1859
- In service: 13 September 1858
- Fate: Sold 12 July 1864; wrecked 4 March 1869

General characteristics
- Displacement: 464 tons
- Length: 162 ft 4 in (49.48 m)
- Beam: 24 ft 4 in (7.42 m)
- Draft: 14 ft (4.3 m)
- Speed: 9 kts
- Complement: 90
- Armament: 4 × 32-pounder guns

The second USS Mohawk was a screw steamship in the United States Navy. She was the SS Caledonia, which the US Navy acquired in 1858 and sold in 1864. After her sale she became SS Alliance and was wrecked in 1869.

== Origins ==
Mohawk was built as Caledonia by Teas & Birely, Philadelphia, Pennsylvania and launched 11 June 1853.

== US Navy service ==
The Navy chartered her on 13 September 1858. She entered service soon after, Commander Augustus L. Case in command.

Mohawk sailed at once for South America to take part in Flag Officer William B. Shubrick's 18-ship Paraguay expedition, attempting to gain apology for the 1855 firing upon survey steamer Water Witch. Arriving Asunción with the squadron 25 January 1859, Caledonia took position above Rosario in Río de la Plata, ready for operations while negotiations were conducted. Paraguay agreed to apologize for the incident and pay an indemnity.

The steamer returned to the United States in February, was purchased by the Navy 14 June 1859, and renamed Mohawk on that date. She commissioned at New York Navy Yard 19 September 1859, Lt. Tunis Craven in command.

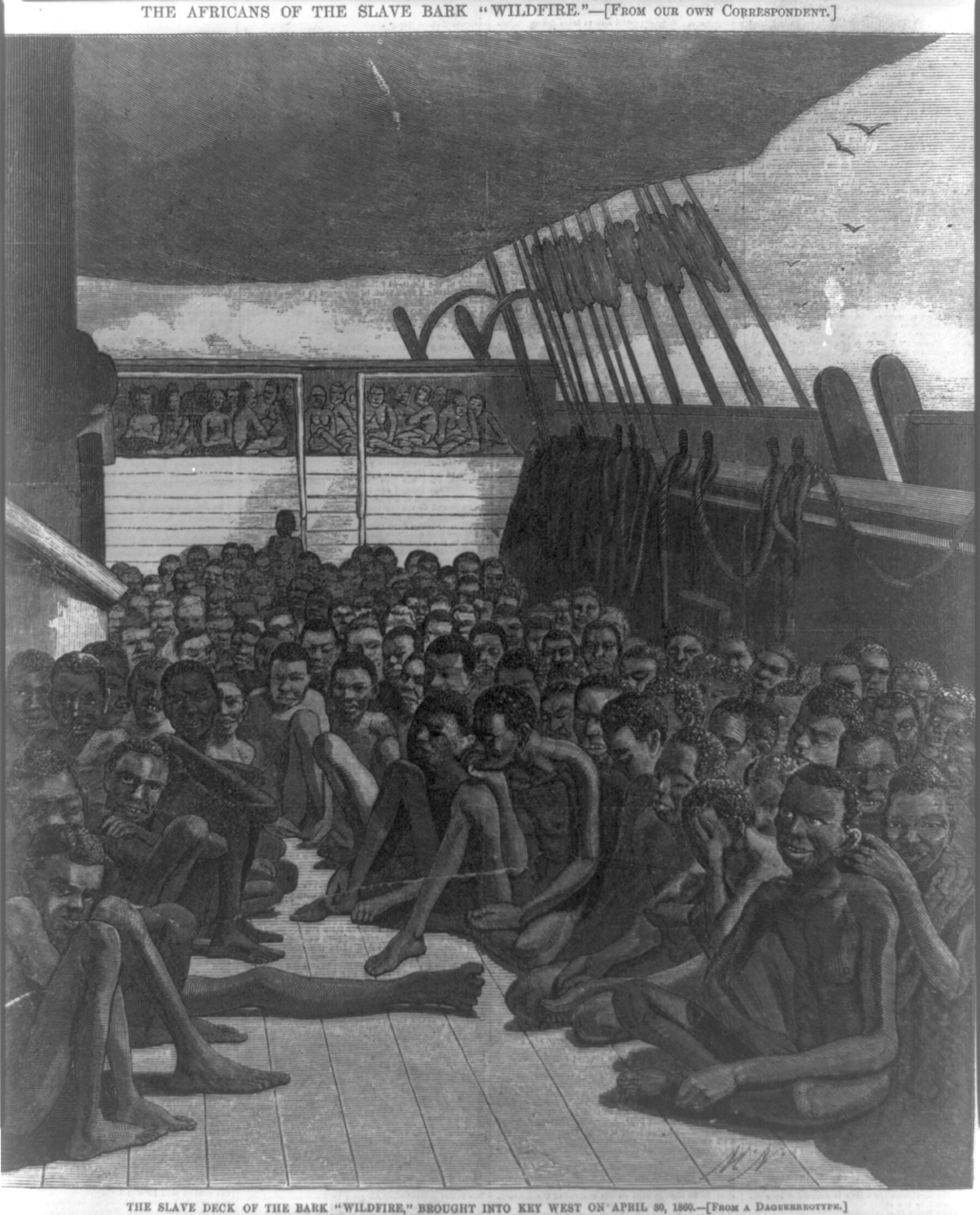
Africans on the slave bark Wildfire; brought into Key West on 30 April 1860

Mohawk operated against pirates and slavers off the east coast and in the Caribbean through 1861, capturing slave ship Wildfire in Old Bahama Channel 28 April 1860, and delivering the prize to Key West where the crew was imprisoned. The 530 Africans on board were placed in a camp for protection, guarded by Mohawk's marines, until they could be returned home. Originally from the Congo they were returned to Liberia.

From 15 November on Lieutenant Craven in Mohawk, with the steamer Wyandotte, defended Forts Jefferson and Taylor at Key West, from actions of "bands of lawless men", a farsighted action that enabled the Union to retain that vital Florida base, so valuable during the forthcoming naval operations in the American Civil War. Mohawk remained on guard at Key West until the end of January 1861 and then sailed for New York.

On 11 March 1861, Mohawk departed for the Caribbean, escorting the supply ship Empire City to Havana and then Indianola, Texas. Mohawk proceeded to Pensacola, Florida via Havana and Key West, arriving 10 May and took up her blockade station off that port. She next moved on to patrol off St. Marks, Florida, capturing the sloop George B. Sloat 5 July as she was attempting to run the blockade. Mohawk remained on station until she sailed for New York 8 April 1862.

Two and one-half months later, Mohawk sailed for Port Royal, South Carolina, to join Flag Officer Samuel F. DuPont's South Atlantic Blockading Squadron. She returned to Port Royal in June 1863 for duty as guardship. Ordered north for repairs 27 June 1864, on 6 July she reported to Commodore Cornelius Stribling at Philadelphia Navy Yard.

== Fate ==
Mohawk's old and damaged boilers and her poor general condition from wartime use rendered her unfit for further service. The Navy sold her on 12 July 1864. Subsequently renamed Alliance while in commercial service, she was wrecked at Hatteras Inlet, North Carolina, on 4 March 1869.
