= Second siege of Veracruz =

1860 siege in the Mexican Reform War

- Part of the Reform War
Date	21 March 1860
Location	Veracruz, Veracruz, Mexico
Result	Liberal victory

Belligerents
(Mexico) Conservatives; Supported by: Spain	(Mexico) Liberals; Supported by: United States

Commanders and leaders
(Mexico) Miguel Miramón	(Mexico) Benito Juárez

The second siege of Veracruz was a military encounter of Mexico's Reform War that took place around the port of Veracruz in 1860. Conservative President Miguel Miramón besieged the Liberal capital, Veracruz, for over a month but was compelled to withdraw after he ran out of ammunition. Part of his problem was that he was unable to blockade the port by sea due to the intervention of the United States off Antón Lizardo (see Battle of Antón Lizardo).
