= Virginia (pilot boat) =

Sandy Hook Pilot boat

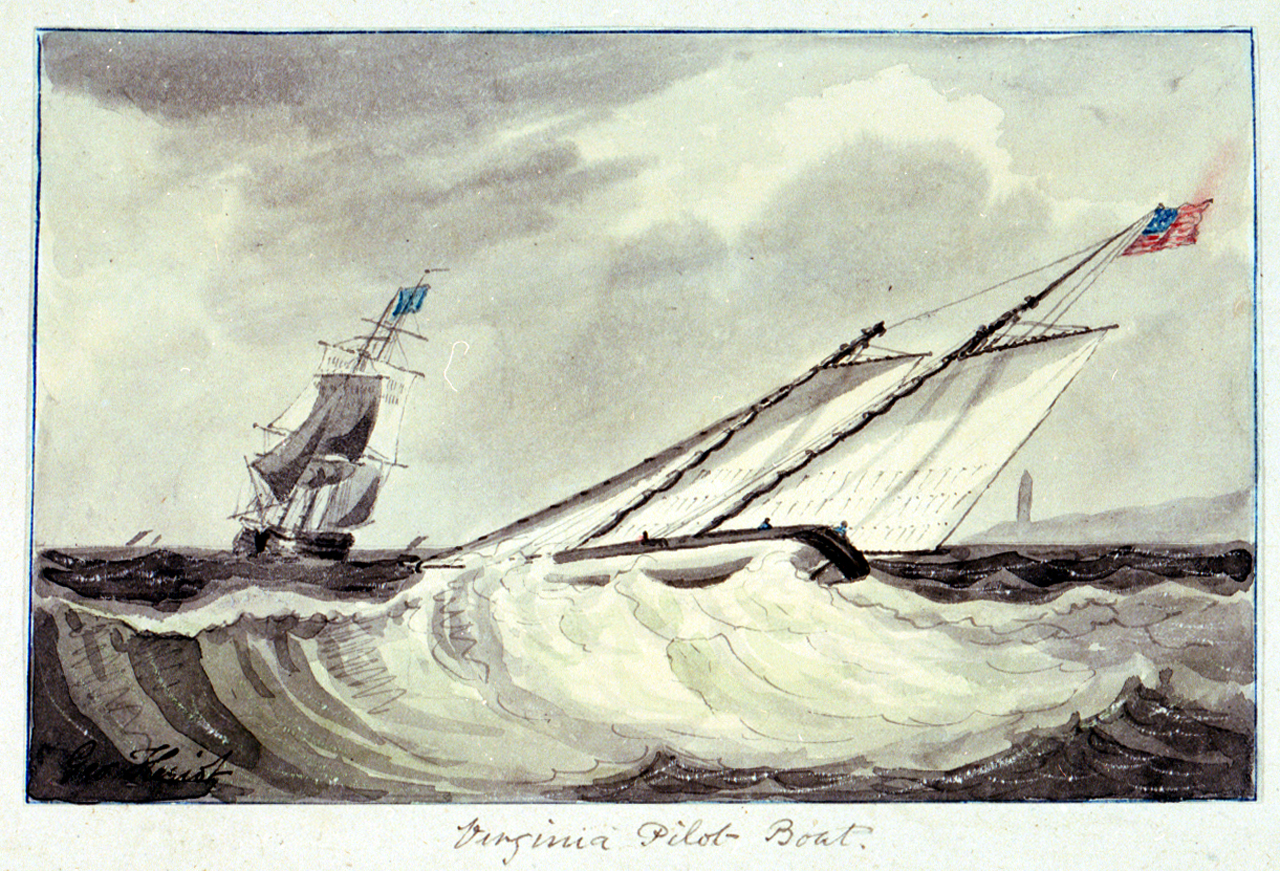
- Pilot Boat Virginia

History

United States
- Name: Virginia
- Owner: N. Y. Pilots
- Operator: G. Wright; Thomas E. B. Johnson; Walter Brewer
- Launched: ca. 1838
- Out of service: March 7, 1860
- Fate: Wreck (1860)

General characteristics
- Class & type: schooner
- Propulsion: Sail

The Virginia was a 19th-century Sandy Hook pilot boat. She came from Savannah to New York City in 1838. In 1840, the Virginia was No. 8 in the list of only eight pilot boats in the New York fleet. She went ashore in 1860 and was replaced by the pilot boat William H. Aspinwall in 1861.

== Construction and service ==
On April 3, 1838, pilot boat Virginia was cleared to leave the port of Charleston, South Carolina, with Captain G. Wright for Norfolk, Virginia. She left Charleston for sea on April 6 and arrived in the Port of New York on April 24, 1838.

In 1840, there were only eight pilot boats in the New York fleet. They were the Phantom, No. 1; Washington, No. 2; New York, No. 3; Jacob Bell, No. 4; Blossom, No. 5; T. H. Smith, No. 6; John E. Davidson, No. 7; and the Virginia, No. 8. The boat number "8" was painted as a large number on her mainsail, that identified her as belonging to the Sandy Hook pilots.

On December 14, 1840, the Thomas E. B. Johnson, of the pilot boat Virginia, along with other pilots from the port of New York, stated that they had never been employed by J. D. Stevenson and no compensation has been offered or demanded.

On August 14, 1843, Captain G. Wright, of the pilot boat Virginia, was 45 miles east of Cape Henlopen, when he spoke to the brig Wm. Neilson from New York bound to Port-au-Prince.

On July 17, 1848, the New York pilot boat Virginia spoke to the British Brig Sisters that was short on provisions. She was on her way to Halifax, Nova Scotia.

On October 26, 1850, the pilot boat Virginia, near the Narrows, was returning from a cruise when she was struck on her starboard side by an outbound schooner causing damage to her rigging. The schooner also received damage and one man was seriously injured.

On October 13, 1854, the Virginia No. 3, came across the cutwater, stem, and a female figurehead from a vessel. The figurehead was painted a light blue with a wreath of roses around her head.

On October 9, 1859, John Burke, a native of Germany, was a hand on board the pilot boat Virginia when he died of exhaustion.

== End of service ==
On March 7, 1860, the New York pilot boat Virginia, No. 3, ran ashore in thick fog and gale ten miles east of Rockaway Shoals. The crew was able to escape to safety. The boat was owned by pilots Walter Brewer, Thomas Morley, William Rock, George Burgess, and Ralph Altkins.

On January 30, 1861, the pilot boat William H. Aspinwall, No 21, was launched from the J. B. Van Dusen Bros. shipyard at the foot of Sixteenth street, East River. She was a replacement for the former pilot boat Virginia. Captain Walter Brewer was in command.

== See also ==
- List of Northeastern U. S. Pilot Boats
