= Augustus Case =

Augustus Ludlow Case
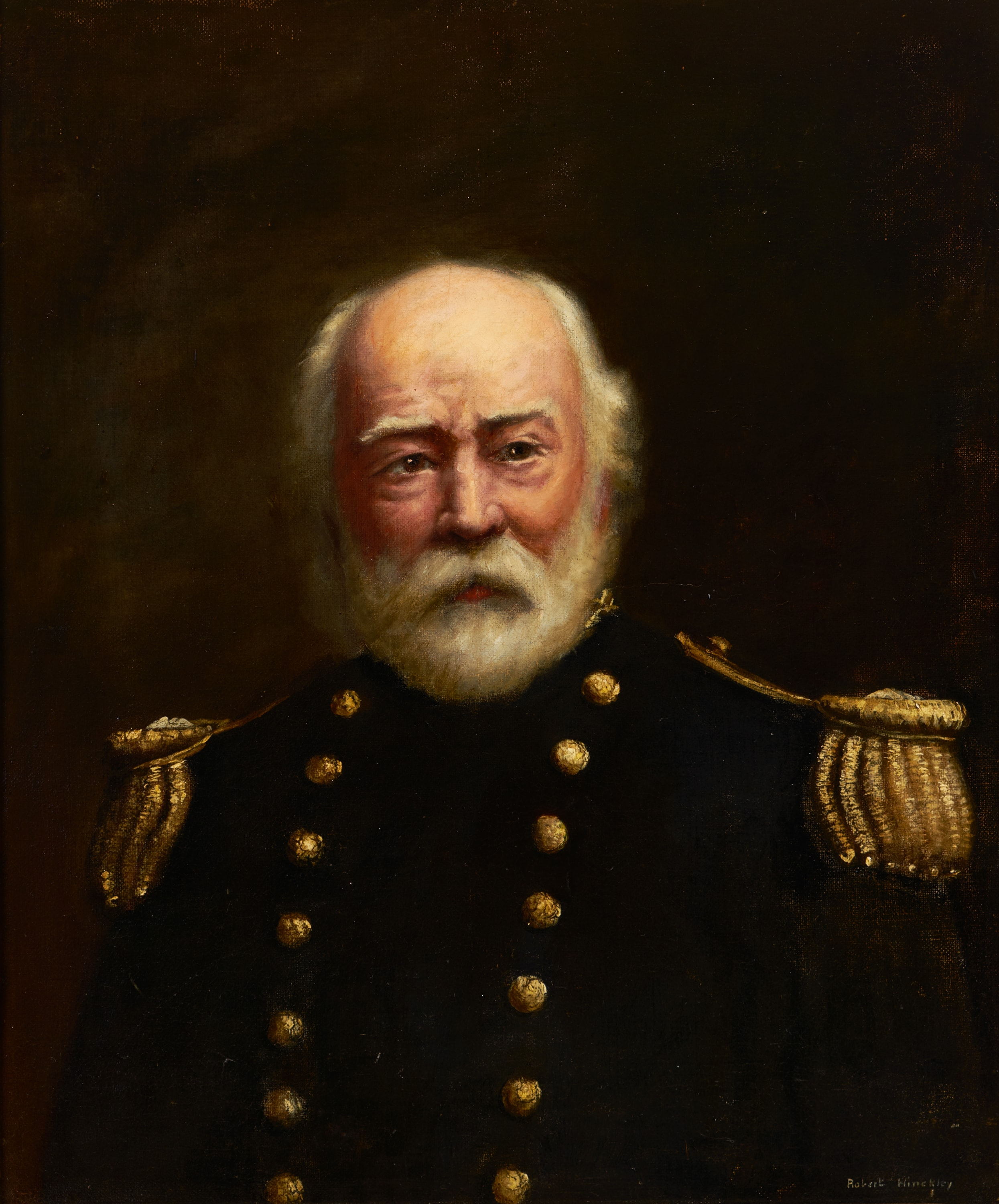
- Born: February 3, 1813; Newburgh, New York
- Died: February 17, 1893 (aged 80); Washington, D.C.
- Military career
- Allegiance: United States of America
- Branch: United States Navy; Union Navy
- Service years: 1828–1875
- Rank: Rear Admiral
- Commands: European Squadron; Bureau of Ordnance; Iroquois; Mohawk; Warren
- Conflicts: Mexican–American War; Paraguay expedition American Civil War

Augustus Ludlow Case (February 3, 1813 – February 17, 1893) was a rear admiral in the United States Navy who served during the American Civil War.

== Biography ==
Born in Newburgh, New York in 1813, Case was appointed midshipman in 1828.

He participated in the Wilkes Expedition of 1837–1842 which explored the South Seas and discovered the Antarctic Continent.

During the Mexican–American War, Case held the town of Palisada with 25 men against the Mexican cavalry for two weeks to block the escape of General Santa Ana. After the war, he commanded the sloop-of-war Warren in the Pacific Squadron from October 1851 to March 1853. Case also participated in the Paraguay expedition of 1859, commanding the steamer Mohawk.

In the Civil War, Case was Fleet Captain of the North Atlantic Blockading Squadron in its capture of Forts Clark and Hatteras in August 1861. He commanded the sloop-of-war Iroquois from January to October 1863.

From 1869 to 1873, Case was Chief of the Bureau of Ordnance, attaining the rank of rear admiral on May 24, 1872. From 1873 to 1875, he commanded the European Squadron, and the combined European, North and South Atlantic Squadrons assembled at Key West in 1874.

Admiral Case retired in 1875, and died at his home in Washington, D.C. in 1893. His grave site is located in Island Cemetery, Newport, Rhode Island.

== Namesake ==
Two ships have been named USS Case for him.
