= Antón Lizardo, Veracruz =

Antón Lizardo
- Town
- Location within Veracruz Location within Mexico
- Coordinates: 19°03′0″N 95°59′0″W
- Country: Mexico
- State: Veracruz
- Municipality: Alvarado

Government
  - Federal electoral district: Veracruz's 17th

Population (2005)
  - Total: 4,586
- Time zone: UTC-6 (Zona Centro)
- Climate: Aw

Antón Lizardo is a fishing town (2005 population 4,586) in the Mexican state of Veracruz. It is located 23 km (14 mi) south of the port city of Veracruz, near Boca del Río, in the municipality of Alvarado.

In January 1860, the small naval Battle of Antón Lizardo occurred here between Mexican rebels and United States Navy warships. Since 11 November 1952, it is the home of the Heroica Escuela Naval Militar, the country's Naval Academy.

Antón Lizardo has a fairly long beach with fine, dark, hard-packed sand and calm shallow waters that make up part of the Veracruz Coral Reef System. The beach is used for transportation for scuba diving at the coral reefs, but offers no protection from the wind or from drivers. The beaches here, as in Veracruz and Boca del Río, are popular during national holidays and Carnaval.
