= Warner B. Bayley =

United States Navy officer (1845–1928)

- Born: 9 September 1845; Baldwinsville, New York, US
- Died: 22 April 1928 (aged 82); Washington, D.C., US
- Burial place: Arlington National Cemetery
- Military career
- Allegiance: United States of America
- Branch: United States Navy
- Service years: 1864–1869; 1870–1906
- Rank: Rear admiral
- Conflicts: American Civil War; Spanish–American War

Rear Admiral Warner Baldwin Bayley (9 September 1845 – 22 April 1928) was a United States Navy officer. His career specialized in engineering and included service in the Spanish–American War and the investigation of the sinking of the battleship USS Maine.

== Naval career ==
Bayley was born in Baldwinsville, New York, on 9 September 1845. He was appointed to U.S. Navy service as an acting third assistant engineer during the American Civil War on 4 August 1864. He mustered out of the Navy on 28 April 1869, but apparently returned to Navy service soon thereafter, being promoted to second assistant engineer on 2 September 1870. He served aboard the screw sloop-of-war USS Lancaster in the North Atlantic Squadron from 1873 to 1874, then had a tour of shore duty at the Navy's Bureau of Steam Engineering from 1875 to 1877 and was promoted to first assistant engineer on 21 September 1877. He then returned to sea in the Asiatic Squadron, first aboard the gunboat USS Monocacy from 1877 to 1878, then aboard the tug USS Palos from 1878 to 1880.

After another tour at the Bureau of Steam Engineering from 1880 to 1881, Bayley was on special duty with the United States Department of the Navy from 1881 to 1885. He then served aboard the screw steamer USS Pensacola in the European Squadron from 1885 to 1888. He had duty under the United States Fish Commission from 1888 to 1892, followed by a tour at the New York Navy Yard in Brooklyn, New York, from 1892 to 1893.

Bayley returned to sea in 1893, serving aboard the new gunboat USS Machias in the North Atlantic Squadron into 1894. In April 1894 he reported for duty aboard the gunboat USS Alert and was promoted to chief engineer on 25 May 1894. He was aboard the monitor USS Monterey from 1895 to 1896.

After brief service at the Bureau of Steam Engineering beginning in June 1896, Bayley began a tour at the United States Civil Service Commission in August 1896. He remained there until he reported aboard the battleship USS Massachusetts in the North Atlantic Squadron for duty as Fleet Engineer. Massachusetts was reassigned to the Flying Squadron in March 1898 and operated with that squadron off Cuba after the Spanish–American War broke out in April 1898. Although Massachusetts was away coaling and missed the climactic Battle of Santiago de Cuba, Bayley distinguished himself in other actions off Cuba and was advanced two numbers for "eminent and conspicuous conduct in battle" during his time aboard her.

After the U.S. Navy abolished the distinction between engineering and line officers, Bayley's rank was converted to lieutenant commander on 3 March 1899. Leaving Massachusetts in November 1900, he reported to the Bureau of Steam Engineering on 27 November 1900 for inspection duty, and was promoted to commander on 3 March 1901.

From September to November 1903, Bayley was a member of a board of inquiry examining the 15 February 1898 destruction of the battleship USS Maine in Havana harbor, which precipitated the outbreak of the Spanish–American War. He became a member of the Navy Examining Board on 2 November 1903 and, promoted to captain on 1 July 1905, remained on it until going on an extended period of sick leave beginning 11 November 1905. He retired from the Navy at the rank of rear admiral while on sick leave on 18 April 1906.

== Personal life ==
Bayley married the former Annette Williamson (d. 19 August 1947) in October 1890. They were had one son.

== Death ==
Bayley died in Washington, D.C., on 22 April 1928 and is buried with his wife at Arlington National Cemetery, in Arlington, Virginia.

== Gallery ==
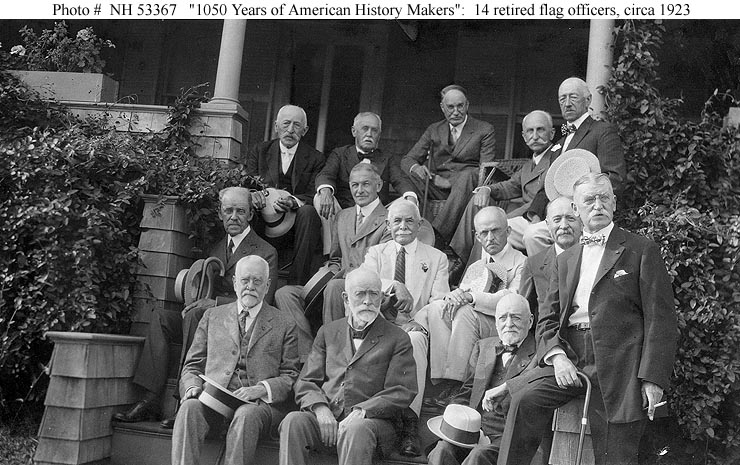
Bayley is second from the left in the back row in this photograph of 13 retired U.S. Navy and U.S. Marine Corps flag officers taken c. 1923.

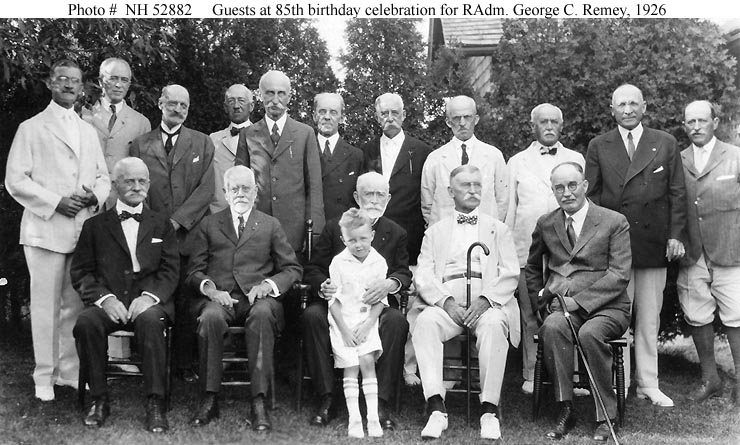
Bayley is standing second from right in this photo of retired flag officers taken at the 85th birthday party of Rear Admiral George C. Remey on 10 August 1926.
