= Joseph P. Fyffe =

- Born: 26 July 1832; Champaign County, Ohio
- Died: 25 February 1896 (aged 63); Champaign County, Ohio
- Burial place: Oak Dale Cemetery, Urbana, Ohio
- Military career
- Allegiance: United States of America
- Branch: United States Navy
- Service years: 1847–1894
- Rank: Rear admiral
- Commands: USS Saugus (USS Centaur); USS Monocacy; Receiving ship USS St. Louis; Receiving ship USS Franklin; USS Pensacola; President, Board to Examine Naval and Merchant Vessels; Naval Station New London; Boston Navy Yard and Naval Station
- Conflicts: Mexican War; American Civil War; Union blockade

Joseph P. Fyffe (26 July 1832 – 25 February 1896) was a rear admiral in the United States Navy. He saw service in both the Mexican War and the American Civil War.

== Naval career ==
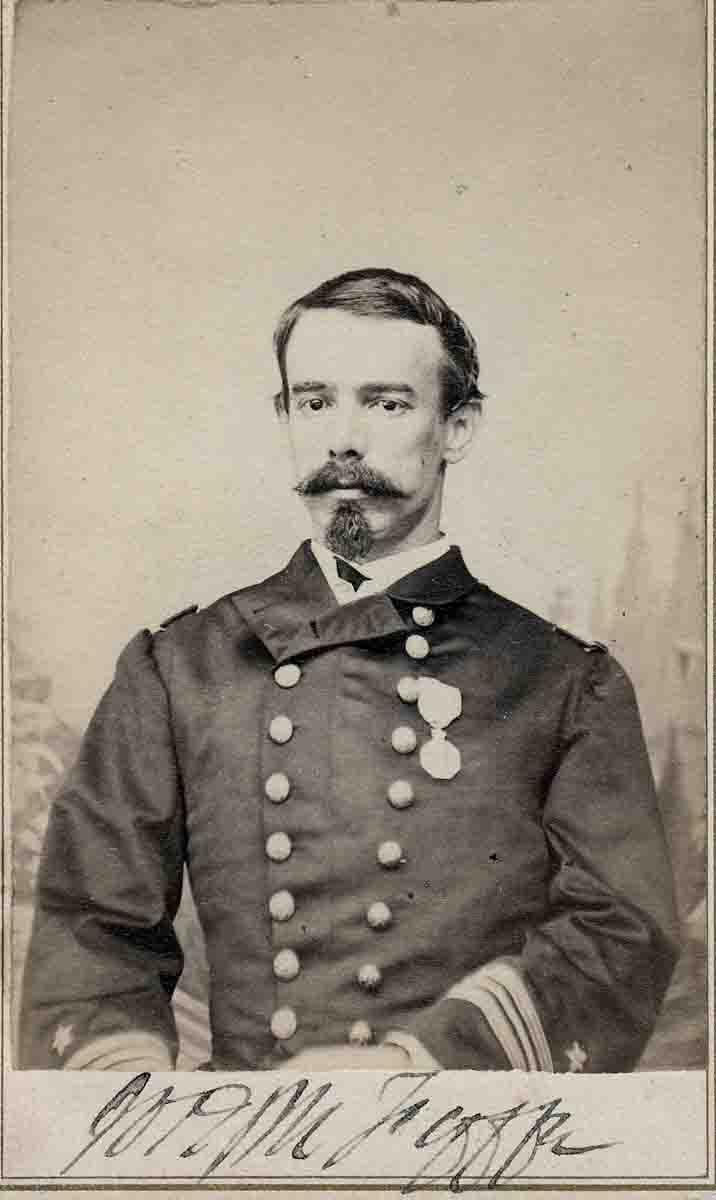
Fyffe as a lieutenant commander, sometime between 1862 and 1865

Fyffe was born in Champaign County, Ohio, on 26 July 1832, the son of Edward Pierce Fyffe (1810–1867) and the former Sarah Ann Robinson (1814–1872). He was appointed a midshipman on 9 September 1847. He was attached first to the bomb brig USS Stromboli in the Home Squadron from 1847 to 1848, seeing service on blockade duty off Mexico during the Mexican War. His next assignment was to the sloop-of-war USS Yorktown off the coast of Africa from 1848 to 1850, after which he was back in the Home Squadron during 1852. He attended the United States Naval Academy in Annapolis, Maryland, from 1853 to 1854 and, upon completing his studies, was promoted to passed midshipman on 15 June 1854.

Fyffe was assigned to special service aboard the screw frigate USS San Jacinto in 1855, and was promoted to lieutenant on 16 September 1855. He served aboard the store ship USS Relief in the Brazil Squadron from 1856 to 1857, aboard the sloop-of-war USS Germantown in the East India Squadron from 1857 to 1859, and on the steam sloop USS Lancaster from 1860 to 1861.

The American Civil War broke out in April 1861, and Fyffe was promoted to lieutenant commander on 16 July 1862. He served aboard the steam frigate USS Minnesota, flagship of the North Atlantic Blockading Squadron, from 1863 to 1865. While aboard Minnesota, he participated in the Union blockade of the Confederate States of America, and took part in the destruction of the blockade runner Hebe and of two Confederate guns on the beach near Fort Fisher, North Carolina, in August 1863; the destruction of the blockade runner Ranger and an engagement with Confederate infantry near Fort Caswell, North Carolina, in January 1864; combat with Confederate artillery above Cox's Wharf on Virginia's James River in May 1864; two engagements with Confederate artillery on the James River in June 1864, at Deep Bottom and at Curtis's Neck near Tilghman's Wharf; and an engagement with Confederate artillery and rams on the James River at Dutch Gap in January 1865.

After the Civil War, Fyffe performed duty at the Boston Navy Yard in Charlestown, Massachusetts, in 1867 and was promoted to commander on 2 December 1867. He served aboard the screw sloop-of-war USS Oneida in the Asiatic Squadron from 1868 to 1869. He was commanding officer of the monitor USS Saugus (known briefly as USS Centaur in 1869) in the North Atlantic Fleet from 1869 to 1870, officer-in-charge of the nitre depot at Malden, Massachusetts, from 1871 to 1872, and commanding officer of the sidewheel gunboat USS Monocacy in the Asiatic Squadron from 1875 to 1878.

Promoted to captain on 13 January 1879, Fyffe commanded the receiving ship USS St. Louis at League Island in Philadelphia, Pennsylvania, from 1879 to 1880 and the receiving ship USS Franklin at Naval Station Norfolk in Norfolk, Virginia, from 1880 to 1882. He returned to sea as commanding officer of the screw steamer USS Pensacola on the Pacific Station from 1882 to 1883, and then returned to the Boston Navy Yard for duty from 1885 to 1888.

Fyffe was promoted to commodore on 28 February 1889, then awaited orders from 1889 to 1890. He was on special duty at Boston, Massachusetts, as President of the Board to Examine Naval and Merchant Vessels from October 1890 to June 1891, and from 29 June 1891 to June 1893 he was commander of Naval Station New London at New London, Connecticut. In his final tour, he served as commander of the Boston Navy Yard and Naval Station from 13 July 1893 to July 1894.

As Fyffe approached his mandatory retirement at age 62 on 26 July 1894, he faced the possibility of retiring as a commodore rather than as a rear admiral, as no rear admiral billets were due to become open before that date. Rear Admiral Joseph S. Skerrett was due to retire upon reaching the age of 62 on 18 January 1895, but in order to make room for Fyffe to be promoted, Skerrett voluntarily requested an earlier retirement based on time in service. Skerrett thus was placed on the retired list early, on 9 July 1894, allowing Fyffe to be promoted to rear admiral on 10 July 1894. Fyffe then retired as a rear admiral on 20 July 1894.

== Permanent change of station travel expenses ==
Traditionally, the cost of transportation for a Navy officer and his family was initially paid for by the officer receiving the permanent change of station orders, and he would be reimbursed upon arrival for all expenses and pay en route. Lieutenant commander (United States) Joseph P. Fyffe changed this custom in 1870 when he was assigned to travel from New England to San Francisco in order to take a new assignment. Since he had no funds for travel, he walked. He strapped his dress sword to a small suitcase and began walking from New England to San Francisco, sending a telegram each night showing his progress and nightly accommodations. After five days on the road, his shoes gave out, and he sent this telegram: "30 August 1870. En route X on foot X requested recruiting officer be authorized issue me new shoes X shoes fell apart noon today X entered Albany (New York) barefooted X will remain Seward Hotel two days awaiting answer X earned my keep as bartender X local rum far superior to that served in the US Navy X am sending sample X very respectfully Fyffe." The next day, the local recruiting station received a telegram from the Secretary of the Navy advancing funds for the transportation of officers to their new duty stations. "Pass following message to Lt. Comdr J. P. Fyffe USN now at Seward Hotel Bar Quote I strike my colors X United States Secretary of the Navy authorizes recruiting officer Albany issue you shoes and provide you quickest transportation from Albany to San Francisco X Even Chief Bureau of Navigation (United States Navy) can laugh when outsmarted X unquote X Respectfully Bureau of Navigation".

== Personal life ==
Fyffe was married to the former Clifford Neff (25 April 1840 – 19 January 1911). Among their children were Elizabeth Fyffe (1867–1958) and Mary Fyffe Mitchell (1873–1934).

== Death ==
Fyffe died on 25 February 1896 in Champaign County, Ohio. He is buried with his wife at Oak Dale Cemetery in Urbana, Ohio.
