= Agnes Irwin =

Agnes Irwin may refer to:

- Agnes Irwin (educator) (1841–1914), the first dean of Radcliffe College
- Agnes Irwin School, a college prep school in Rosemont, Pennsylvania, founded in 1869 by the educator
