= Admiral Bayly =

Admiral Bayly may refer to:

- Lewis Bayly (Royal Navy officer) (1857–1938), British Royal Navy admiral
- Patrick Bayly (1914–1998), British Royal Navy vice-admiral

== See also ==
- Warner B. Bayley (1845–1928), U.S. Navy rear admiral
