= John Irwin (admiral) =

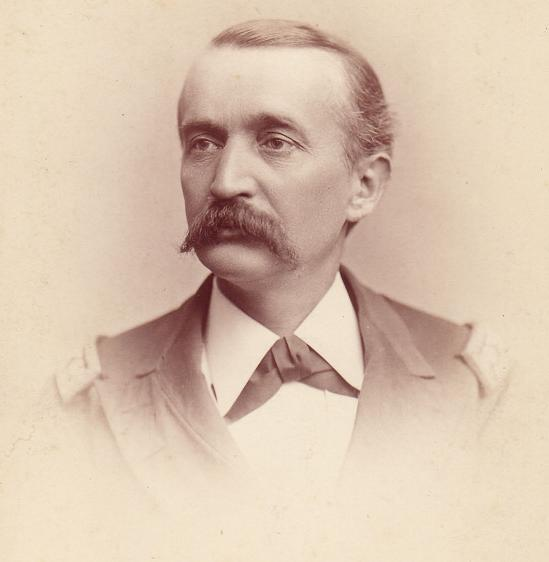
- Rear Admiral John Irwin
- Born: 15 April 1832; Pittsburgh or Lancaster, Pennsylvania, US (sources vary)
- Died: 28 July 1901 (aged 69); Washington, D.C., US
- Burial place: Arlington National Cemetery
- Relatives: William W. Irwin (father); Agnes Irwin (half-sister); Robert Walker Irwin (half-brother)
- Military career
- Allegiance: United States of America
- Branch: United States Navy
- Service years: 1847–1894
- Rank: Rear Admiral
- Commands: USS New Berne; USS Gettysburg; USS Yantic; USS Sabine; USS Pensacola; Mare Island Navy Yard; Asiatic Squadron; Pacific Squadron
- Conflicts: African Slave Trade Patrol; American Civil War Union blockade Battle of Hatteras Inlet Batteries Battle of Port Royal Battle of Port Royal Ferry; Black Week (Hawaii)

Rear Admiral John Irwin (15 April 1832 – 28 July 1901) was an officer in the United States Navy. He participated in the African Slave Trade Patrol, fought in the American Civil War, and served as commander of the Asiatic and Pacific Squadrons.

== Naval career ==
Irwin was born in Pittsburgh or Lancaster (sources vary), Pennsylvania, on 15 April 1832. He was the son of United States Congressman William W. Irwin and Frances Everallyn Rose Irwin. He was also the great-great step-grandson of Benjamin Franklin through his step-mother, Sophia Arabella Bache.

=== Early career ===
Irwin was appointed as a midshipman on 9 September 1847 and immediately went to sea, being attached to the frigate USS Cumberland in the Home Squadron from 1847 to 1848, to the frigate USS St. Lawrence in the Mediterranean Squadron from 1849 to 1850, and to the frigate USS John Adams on the African Slave Trade Patrol off the west coast of Africa from 1851 to 1853. He was promoted to passed midshipman on 10 June 1853.

Assigned to the sidewheel steamer USS Fulton in the Home Squadron from 1854 to 1856, Irwin was promoted to master on 16 September 1855 and then to lieutenant on the same day. His next assignment was with the United States Coast Survey from 1857 to 1858. He then served aboard the frigate USS Savannah in the Home Squadron from 1859 to 1860.

=== American Civil War ===
In 1861, Irwin reported for duty aboard the screw frigate USS Wabash. The American Civil War broke out in April 1861, and Irwin saw a great deal of action against Confederate forces aboard Wabash. During Irwin's tour, Wabash participated in the capture of Forts Hatteras and Clark at Hatteras Inlet, North Carolina, on 29 August 1861, before becoming the flagship of the South Atlantic Blockading Squadron, one of the squadrons engaged in the Union blockade of Confederate ports. Wabash then took part in the capture of Fort Walker, Fort Beauregard, and Port Royal Sound, South Carolina, in the Battle of Port Royal on 7 November 1861. Irwin later was in command of boat howitzers Wabash placed ashore during the Battle of Port Royal Ferry, South Carolina, on 1 January 1862, and was aboard Wabash for the Battle of Fort Pulaski at Cockspur Island, Georgia, on 10–11 April 1862. He was promoted to lieutenant commander on 16 July 1862.

Leaving Wabash in 1863, Irwin performed ordnance duty at Philadelphia, Pennsylvania, in 1864, transferring later in 1864 to sea duty in the Gulf of Mexico, where he served in the Western Gulf Blockading Squadron through the end of the war in 1865.

=== Post-Civil War ===
After the Civil War, Irwin was assigned to special duty at Philadelphia from 1866 to 1867 and was promoted to commander on 25 July 1866. He then returned to sea, serving in the North Atlantic Squadron from 1868 to 1871, in command successively of the steamer USS New Berne in 1868, the steamer USS Gettysburg from 1868 to 1870, and the screw gunboat USS Yantic from 1870 to 1871.

After spending 1872 on duty at League Island in Philadelphia, Irwin was commanding officer of the sailing frigate USS Sabine, then operating as a training ship, from 1873 to 1875. He was promoted to captain on 15 May 1875, and commanded the screw steamer USS Pensacola, flagship of the Pacific Station, from 1875 to 1879.

Irwin then began a lengthy series of shore tours, beginning with an assignment at Mare Island Navy Yard in Vallejo, California, from 1879 to 1883, followed by special duty in 1884 and a tour as president of the Board of Inspection, California, from 1884 to 1888, during which he was promoted to commodore on 4 March 1886. He was idle, awaiting orders, from 13 December 1889 to 12 July 1890, when he assumed duties as a member of the Board of Inspection and Survey. He was promoted to rear admiral on 19 May 1891.

Departing the board in June 1891, Irwin finally returned to sea when he assumed command of the Asiatic Squadron on 7 June 1891. He arrived in Honolulu, Hawaii, suddenly and unexpectedly on 6 November 1893 to replace Commodore Joseph S. Skerrett there as commander-in-chief of the Pacific Squadron; Skerrett traded places with Irwin, taking command of the Asiatic Squadron. Irwin soon became involved in the "Black Week" crisis of December 1893 – January 1894, during which war nearly broke out between the United States and the Provisional Government of Hawaii.

Irwin was placed on the retired list on 15 April 1894 upon reaching the mandatory retirement age of 62. He hauled down his flag for the final time aboard the protected cruiser USS Philadelphia at Honolulu the following day.

In 1897 Admiral Irwin became a Veteran Companion of the Military Order of Foreign Wars by right of his service in the Mexican War. He was also a First Class Companion of the California Commandery of the Military Order of the Loyal Legion of the United States.

== Retirement and death ==
In retirement, Irwin resided in Washington, D.C., where he died at his home late on the evening of 28 July 1901 after an illness of several months. He left behind his wife, a daughter, and a son, also named John Irwin, who at the time was paymaster aboard the training ship USS Essex. Irwin was interred at Arlington National Cemetery with full naval honors on 31 July 1901.

== Gallery ==
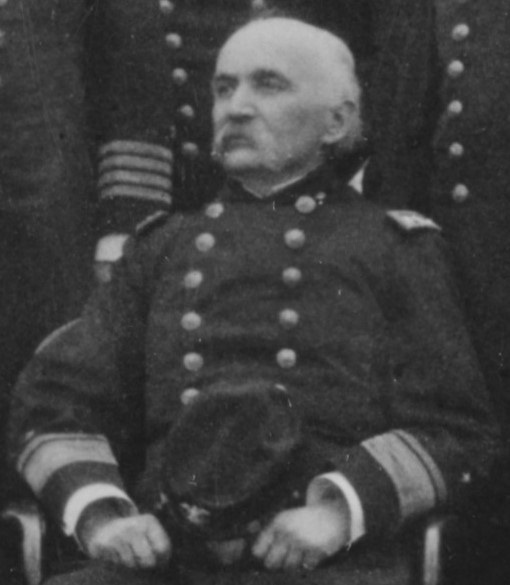
Irwin aboard USS Lancaster at Yokohama, Japan
in 1893

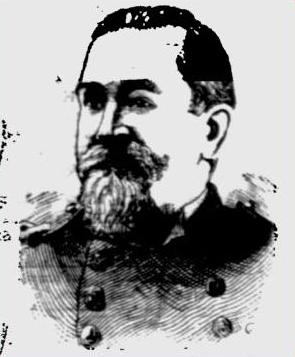
Sketch of Irwin in the Kentucky New Era, June 1, 1894

== Notes ==
Military offices
Preceded by David B. Harmony	Commander-in-Chief, Asiatic Squadron; 11 June 1893 – 11 December 1893	Succeeded by Joseph S. Skerrett
Preceded by Joseph S. Skerrett	Commander-in-Chief, Pacific Squadron; 6 November 1893 – 16 April 1894	Succeeded by Lester A. Beardslee
