= Robert F. R. Lewis =

- An 1868 photograph of an unidentified United States Navy officer on the staff of the United States Naval Academy. It has been suggested that it is a photograph of Commander Robert F. R. Lewis.
- Born: 30 January 1826; Washington, D.C., US
- Died: 23 February 1881 (aged 55) at sea off Martinique
- Burial place: United States Naval Academy Cemetery, Annapolis, Maryland
- Military career
- Allegiance: United States
- Branch: United States Navy
- Service years: 1841–1881
- Rank: Captain
- Commands: USS Itasca; USS Ethan Allen; USS Nipsic; USS Mahaska; USS Nantucket; USS Resaca; USS Yantic; USS Kearsarge; Asiatic Squadron; USS Shenandoah
- Conflicts: African Slave Trade Patrol; Mexican–American War; Capture of San Diego; Action at San Blas; Seizure of La Paz; Bombardment of Guaymas; Clearance of Gulf of California; Capture of Mazatlán; Siege of San José del Cabo; Paraguay Expedition; American Civil War; Union blockade

Captain Robert F. R. Lewis (30 January 1826 – 23 February 1881) was an officer in the United States Navy. He participated in the Paraguay Expedition, fought in the Mexican War and American Civil War, and served briefly as commander of the Asiatic Squadron.

== Naval career ==
Lewis was born on 30 January 1826 in Washington, D.C. He was appointed as a midshipman in October 1841 and immediately was attached to the sloop-of-war USS Warren, which was fitting out at Norfolk Navy Yard in Portsmouth, Virginia, at the time. Before Warren could put to sea, however, Lewis was transferred to the receiving ship USS Pennsylvania at the navy yard, remaining aboard her for a few months. In 1842, he was attached to the sloop-of-war USS Vandalia, and served aboard her until 1845 off the coast of Africa and in the West Indies Squadron.

=== Mexican War ===
Lewis next reported to the sloop-of-war USS Cyane at Norfolk, Virginia, and served aboard her in the Pacific Squadron from 1845 to 1848. Aboard Cyane, he took part in the Mexican War, seeing action in the capture of San Diego, California – then a part of Mexico – the destruction of a Mexican artillery battery at San Blas, the seizure of La Paz in Baja California, and the bombardment of Guaymas in Sonora, where Cyane cut out the Mexican brig Condor while under fire from Mexican troops and artillery ashore and burned the small Mexican fleet there. Cyane went on to clear the Gulf of California of Mexican ships over the course of the next month and participated in the capture of Mazatlán before relieving the siege by Mexican troops and Yaqui Indians of San José del Cabo. Upon Cyane's return to the United States at the conclusion of the war in 1848, United States Secretary of the Navy John Y. Mason congratulated her crew for their significant contribution to the American victory.

=== 1848–1861 ===
After returning to the United States, Lewis reported to the United States Naval Academy in Annapolis, Maryland, in 1848 and passed his examination. Sources differ on the date of his promotion to passed midshipman, stating both that it came on 10 August 1847 while he was aboard Cyane and that it was in 1849 after he passed his examination at the Naval Academy.

In 1849, Lewis went aboard the steamer USS Vixen, aboard which he cruised in the West Indies and along the Spanish Main. In 1850, he transferred to the United States Naval Observatory in Washington, D.C., for a few months, then in 1851 detached to serve aboard commercial steamers of the Collins Line on two or three transatlantic voyages between New York City and Liverpool, England. In 1852 he began an 18-month tour aboard the sloop-of-war USS Preble, in service at the time as a training ship at the Naval Academy, then reported to the brig USS Dolphin, which was fitting out at the Norfolk Navy Yard at the time. Before Dolphin sailed, he transferred in 1853 to the stores ship USS Supply, which was fitting out at the New York Navy Yard in Brooklyn, New York. During his two years aboard Supply, he was promoted to master on 14 September 1855 and to lieutenant the following day, but he detached from Supply in 1855 before she embarked on the first of her two voyages to the Mediterranean to bring camels from the Ottoman Empire home to the United States for experimental use by the United States Army's Camel Corps.

After a short leave period, Lewis was assigned to the receiving ship USS Allegheny at Baltimore, Maryland, in 1856. He transferred to the new sailing frigate USS Sabine in 1858 and served aboard her during a three-year cruise, during which she took part in the Paraguay Expedition and operated in the West Indies.

=== American Civil War ===
Lewis was aboard Sabine when the American Civil War broke out in April 1861. He spent his last few months aboard Sabine on duty in the Union blockade of the Confederate States of America, serving in the blockade of Pensacola, Florida. He commanded a group of boats which carried reinforcements to Fort Pickens under threat from Confederate Fort McRae and was made executive officer of Sabine. After Sabine was decommissioned at the Portsmouth Navy Yard in Kittery, Maine, later in 1861, Lewis took a leave of absence from the Navy, but returned to service later in the year as executive officer of the steamer USS De Soto in the West Gulf Blockading Squadron. He was promoted to lieutenant commander on 16 July 1862.

In 1862, Lewis became commanding officer of the gunboat USS Itasca on the Mississippi River, leading her in action at Man Shack Bend. Itasca later was reassigned to the blockade of Texas, where Lewis led her in an engagement with a Confederate artillery battery at Velasco, in the capture of two blockade runners, and in running aground and destroying two or three other blockade runners. After Itasca was ordered north to undergo repairs in 1863, Lewis was detached from her and took a short leave of absence.

Upon returning to service, Lewis spent three months at Baltimore, Maryland, to oversee the repair and fitting out of ships there, then was sent to the South Atlantic Blockading Squadron in 1864, where he commanded successively the bark USS Ethan Allen, the gunboat USS Nipsic, the sidewheel steamer USS Mahaska, and the monitor USS Nantucket in the blockade of Charleston, South Carolina, and on the St. Johns River. He was in command of Nantucket when she closed to destroy a stranded blockade runner with gunfire off Charleston and engaged the Confederate artillery batteries on Sullivan's Island, as well as during later duty at Port Royal, South Carolina, when Nantucket guarded the receiving ship USS New Hampshire in case New Hampshire was targeted by the Confederate States Navy ironclad CSS Stonewall. After the Civil War ended in April 1865, Lewis brought Nantucket to Philadelphia, where she was laid up.

=== Post-Civil War ===
In 1865, Lewis joined the staff of the Naval Academy, first as senior instructor in seamanship and later as superintendent of grounds and buildings, and was promoted to commander on 29 January 1867. From 1869 to 1871 he commanded the steamer USS Resaca in the Pacific Squadron, then was on the Board of Inspectors from 1871 to 1874. He served in the Asiatic Squadron from 1874 to 1875, first in command of the gunboat USS Yantic and then in command of the sloop-of-war USS Kearsarge, and he temporarily served as commander of the entire squadron from 24 June to 16 August 1875. Detaching from Kearsarge in November 1875, he returned to the United States and spent four months awaiting orders before reporting for duty as Inspector of Ordnance at the Norfolk Navy Yard. He was promoted to captain on 26 February 1878.

On 6 September 1879, Lewis took command of the screw sloop-of-war USS Shenandoah two days before she recommissioned for service in the South Atlantic Squadron as the flagship of Rear Admiral Andrew Bryson.

== Personal life ==
Lewis was married to Henrietta A. Lewis and had five living children at the time of his death.

== Death ==
Lewis contracted an illness while aboard Shenandoah and became sick enough to be ordered to return to the United States for treatment. During the voyage home, he died at sea off Martinique on 23 February 1881. He is buried with his wife at the United States Naval Academy Cemetery in Annapolis, Maryland.

== Notes ==
Military offices
Preceded by Alexander Mosely Pennock	Commander, Asiatic Squadron; 24 June 1875–16 August 1875	Succeeded by William Reynolds
