= USS Tennessee (1865) =

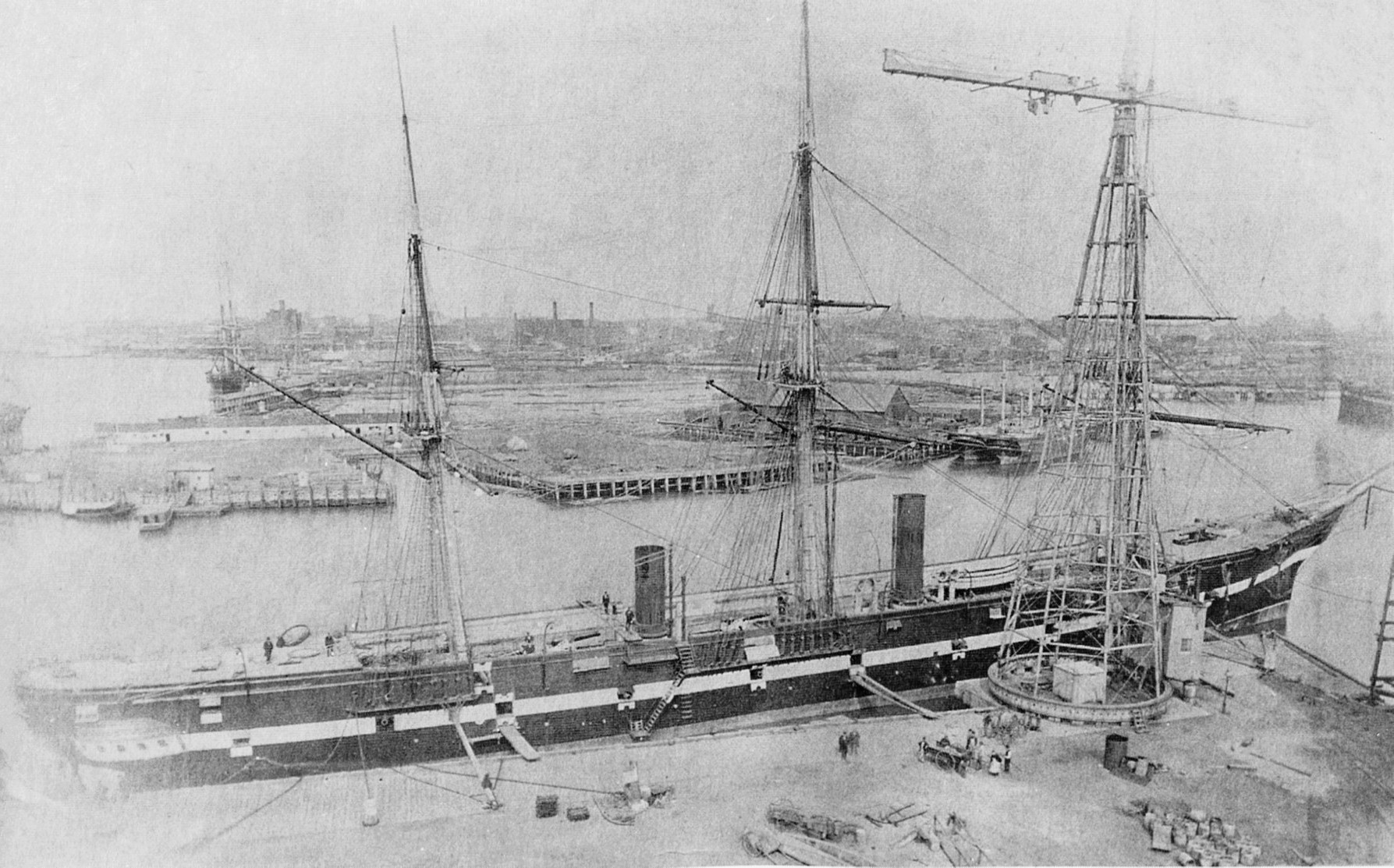
- USS Tennessee at Brooklyn Navy Yard in 1875, after her conversion to a gun-deck frigate

History

United States
- Name: Madawaska/Tennessee
- Namesake: As Madawaska, Madawaska, Maine; As Tennessee, the State of Tennessee
- Launched: 8 July 1865
- Renamed: USS Tennessee 15 May 1869
- Fate: Sold 15 September 1886

General characteristics
- Class & type: Wampanoag-class screw frigate
- Tonnage: 3,281 tons
- Length: 355 ft (108 m)
- Beam: 45 ft 2 in (13.77 m)
- Draft: 21 ft 8 in (6.60 m)
- Propulsion: 2 × vibrating-lever engines (as built); Compound back‑acting engines (as refitted)
- Sail plan: 10 principal sails = 22,500 sq ft (2,090 m^{2}).
- Complement: 480
- Armament: 2 × 8-inch (203-mm) rifles; 2 × 100-pounder (45.5-kg) guns; 1 × 60-pounder (27.2-kg) guns; 18 × 9-inch (229-mm) smooth bore guns

USS Tennessee, originally USS Madawaska, was a screw frigate built of wood at the New York Navy Yard in Brooklyn, New York, and launched as Madawaska on 8 July 1865. Powered by two Ericsson vibrating-lever engines, Madawaska departed New York City for sea trials 14 January 1867, Commander Francis A. Roe in command. Remaining at sea for one week, she steamed nearly 1,000 nautical miles (1,150 statute miles; 1,852 km) before returning when her supply of coal was exhausted.

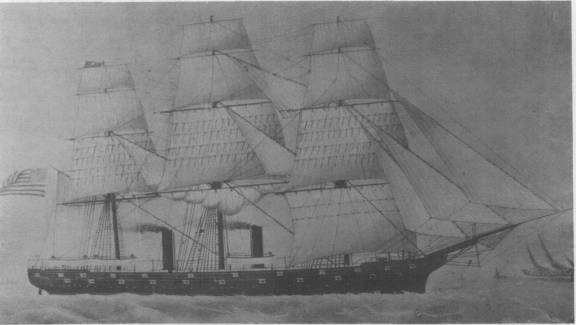
An illustration of USS Madawaska, showing the spar deck added to her in 1869.

She was renamed Tennessee 15 May 1869 and timbered up to the necessary height to allow a spar deck to be installed. She was fitted with new compound back‑acting engines capable of developing 3,200 horsepower (2,400 kW). She carried 380 tons of coal but was also rigged for sail, the area of her 10 principal sails being 22,500 square feet (2,090 m^{2}).

Her duties included service as flagship of the Asiatic Squadron under Rear Admiral William Reynolds, with Captain William W. Low in command. By 1879 she was flagship of the North Atlantic Squadron under Rear Admiral Robert W. Wyman, with Captain David B. Harmony in command. On 15 February 1881 at New Orleans, Louisiana, Seaman George Low jumped overboard and rescued a fellow sailor from drowning, for which he was awarded the Medal of Honor.

In The Steam Navy of the United States, Frank M. Bennet relates that during the time Tennessee was flagship of the North Atlantic Squadron she was "the largest vessel then in commission in the American Navy, and the era of mastless steel cruisers was yet so far away that she was not suspected, by the youngsters at least, of being obsolete and stood as the type of all that was excellent and majestic in ship construction." Her spaciousness and the comfort of her quarters as well as her handling characteristics made her a favorite duty station.

Tennessee was sold on 15 September 1886 to Burdett Pond of Meriden, Connecticut.

== See also ==
- List of steam frigates of the United States Navy
- Bibliography of American Civil War naval history
- Union Navy
- Confederate States Navy
