= Robert Walker Irwin =

American Businessman and politician

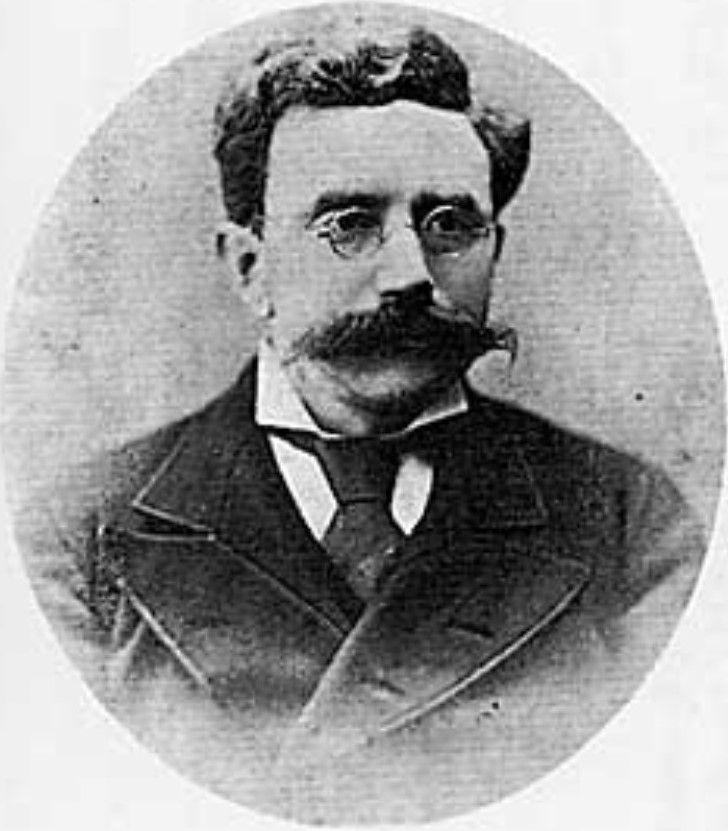
Robert Walker Irwin

Robert Walker Irwin (January 4, 1844 – January 5, 1925) was a Danish-born American businessman and the Kingdom of Hawaii's Minister to Japan. Irwin's most significant accomplishment as Hawaii's top representative to Japan was the 1886 immigration treaty between the two nations that led to significant migration of Japanese nationals to Hawaii.

== Early life ==
Irwin was born in Copenhagen to former Pennsylvania politician and United States Chargé d'affaires to Denmark William W. Irwin. His father had previously served as the Mayor of Pittsburgh (1840–1841) and had served as a Whig member of the U.S. House of Representatives from Pennsylvania.

His mother, Sophia Arabella Bache, was the daughter of Richard Bache Jr. and Sophia Burrell Dallas. She was also the granddaughter of Sarah Franklin Bache and Richard Bache and a great-granddaughter of Benjamin Franklin, as well as a niece of George Mifflin Dallas, the 11th Vice President of the United States, serving under James K. Polk.

In 1866, at the age of 22, Robert Irwin arrived in Japan to head the Yokohama office of the Pacific Mail Steamship Company. In 1867, the company launched the first regular trans-Pacific steamship service fulfilling a contract with the United States government to provide monthly mail service between San Francisco and Hong Kong via Yokohama.

== Kanyaku Imin Immigration ==
By the 1870s, Hawaii had suffered significant population declines due to the introduction of diseases to which Hawaiian natives had no immunity.

In 1880, Irwin took a position as Kingdom of Hawai'i's Consul-General in Japan. In March 1881, Hawaii's King Kalakaua visited Japan during which he discussed with Emperor Meiji Hawaii's desire to encourage Japanese nationals to settle in Hawaii. At that time, King Kalakaua appointed Irwin the Hawaiian Minister to Japan.

Irwin arranged for and accompanied the first 943 government-contracted Kanyaku Imin, or Japanese laborers, who arrived in Honolulu aboard the Pacific Mail Steamship Company City of Tokio on February 8, 1885. After returning to Japan, Irwin received government approval for a second set of 930 government contract laborers who arrived in Hawaii on June 17, 1885.

With the Japanese government satisfied with treatment of the immigrants, Irwin was able to conclude a formal immigration treaty between Hawaii and Japan on January 28, 1886. The treaty stipulated that the Hawaii government would be held responsible for employers' treatment of Japanese immigrants.

The Kanyaku Imin immigration system that Irwin negotiated concluded in June 1894 with 29,339 Japanese nationals having immigrated to Hawaii. This government-sponsored immigration was quickly replaced with private immigration.

In 1900, Hawaii's population had reached approximately 154,000 with Japanese immigrants and their descendants representing over 61,000 of that total.

== Involvement with Mitsui Zaibatsu ==
Irwin cultivated a number of business and government contacts in Japan becoming acquainted with Japanese Finance Minister Masuda Takashi in 1872. He also became good friends with Japanese Count Inoue Kaoru, who had toured the United States with Irwin in 1876 and became a major force for modernization within Japan.

Inoue and Masuda founded the trading company Mitsui Bussan in 1876 with Irwin as an employee at founding. Mitsui Bussan had grown out of earlier trading enterprises of Inoue's that Irwin had helped the Count start in 1873.

In 1900, Irwin and Masuda Takashi together founded Taiwan Sugar Company. Taiwan Sugar Company and Mitsui Bussan were later folded into the Mitsui zaibatsu as Masuda began the transformation of Mitsui into one of Japan's four zaibatsu. Irwin stayed on as an adviser at Taiwan Sugar Company until 1916.

== Family ==
Irwin's older half-brother John Irwin was an American naval officer and his older sister Agnes Irwin was an educator.

Irwin was married to Takechi Iki on March 15, 1882. This was the first legal marriage between an American and Japanese citizen and was arranged by Inoue Kaoru, then the Japanese Foreign Minister.

Irwin had six children. The eldest, Bella, founded the Irwin Gakuen School in Tokyo. Another daughter, Marian Irwin Osterhout, was a plant physiologist.

In 1891, Irwin purchased a summer home in Ikaho. That residence is a designated Historic Place and is open to the public as a small museum to the Irwin family and Japanese emigration to Hawaii.
