= USS Quinnebaug (1866) =

Sloop-of-war of the United States Navy

History

United States
- Name: USS Quinnebaug
- Namesake: An alternate spelling of the name of the Quinebaug River in southern Massachusetts and eastern Connecticut
- Builder: New York Navy Yard, Brooklyn, New York
- Launched: 31 March 1866
- Sponsored by: David B. Harmony
- Commissioned: 19 July 1866
- Decommissioned: 29 July 1870
- Fate: Broken up 1871

General characteristics
- Type: Sloop-of-war
- Tonnage: 1,113 long tons (1,131 t)
- Length: 216 ft (66 m)
- Beam: 30 ft (9.1 m)
- Draft: 12 ft (3.7 m)
- Speed: 7 knots (13 km/h; 8.1 mph)
- Complement: 122
- Armament: 1 × 60-pounder Parrott rifle; 4 × 32-pounder guns; 1 × 20-pounder gun

The first USS Quinnebaug was a screw sloop-of-war in the United States Navy.

== Construction and commissioning ==
Quinnebaug was built by the New York Navy Yard in Brooklyn, New York. She was launched on 31 March 1866, sponsored by Lieutenant Commander David B. Harmony, and commissioned on 19 July 1867.

== Service history ==
Quinnebaug departed New York City on 31 August 1867 and cruised along the Atlantic coast of South America for almost three years before arriving at Norfolk, Virginia, on 18 July 1870. She was decommissioned there on 29 July 1870 and was laid up until broken up in 1871.
