= Alexander Mosely Pennock =

United States Navy admiral (1813–1876)

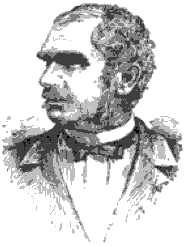
- Born: November 1, 1813; Norfolk, Virginia
- Died: September 20, 1876 (aged 62); Portsmouth, New Hampshire
- Relatives: David Farragut (brother-in-law)
- Military career
- Allegiance: United States of America; Union
- Branch: United States Navy
- Service years: 1828–1875
- Rank: Rear admiral
- Conflicts: Paraguay Expedition; American Civil War

Alexander Mosely Pennock (November 1, 1813 – September 20, 1876) was an officer of the United States Navy during the American Civil War. He was a captain during the war and rose to the rank of rear admiral after the war.

== Biography ==
Alexander Mosely Pennock was born in Norfolk, Virginia, on November 1, 1813.

He joined the United States Navy in April 1828. He was made a midshipman in 1834, commissioned as a lieutenant in March 1839, and as a commander in December 1855. In October 1859 he was appointed Inspector of Lighthouses in the 2nd Lighthouse District, centered on New York. In the fall of 1861 he was reassigned as fleet captain of Flag Officer Andrew Foote's Mississippi River Squadron where he served until 1864. He commanded the USS Southern Star in the Paraguay expedition.

He was promoted to captain in 1863, to commodore in 1868, and rear admiral in 1872. He retired from the Navy in 1875.

Alexander Mosely Pennock died in Portsmouth, New Hampshire, on September 20, 1876.

Military offices
Preceded by Edmund Colhoun	Commander, Asiatic Squadron; 29 May 1874–24 June 1875	Succeeded by Robert F. R. Lewis
