= George Low (Medal of Honor) =

- Born: George Low Evatt c. 1847; Canada
- Died: March 2, 1912 (aged 64–65); Elmhurst, Queens, New York, US
- Military career
- Allegiance: United States of America
- Branch: United States Navy
- Rank: Seaman
- Unit: USS Tennessee
- Awards: Medal of Honor

George Low (1847–1912) was a United States Navy sailor and a recipient of the United States military's highest decoration, the Medal of Honor. His birth name was George Low Evatt.

== Biography ==
Born in about 1847 in Canada, Low immigrated to the United States and joined the Navy from New York. By February 15, 1881, he was serving as a seaman on the USS Tennessee. On that day, while Tennessee was at New Orleans, Louisiana, Gunner's Mate N.P. Petersen fell overboard. Low jumped into the water and kept the man afloat until they were both picked up by a boat. For this action, he was awarded the Medal of Honor three and a half years later, on October 18, 1884.

Low's official Medal of Honor citation reads:

For jumping overboard from the U.S.S. Tennessee at New Orleans, La., 15 February 1881, and sustaining, until picked up by a boat's crew, N. P. Petersen, gunner's mate, who had fallen overboard.

Low died on March 2, 1912 and is buried on St. Michael's Cemetery in East Elmhurst, New York.

== See also ==
- List of Medal of Honor recipients during peacetime
