= Joseph S. Skerrett =

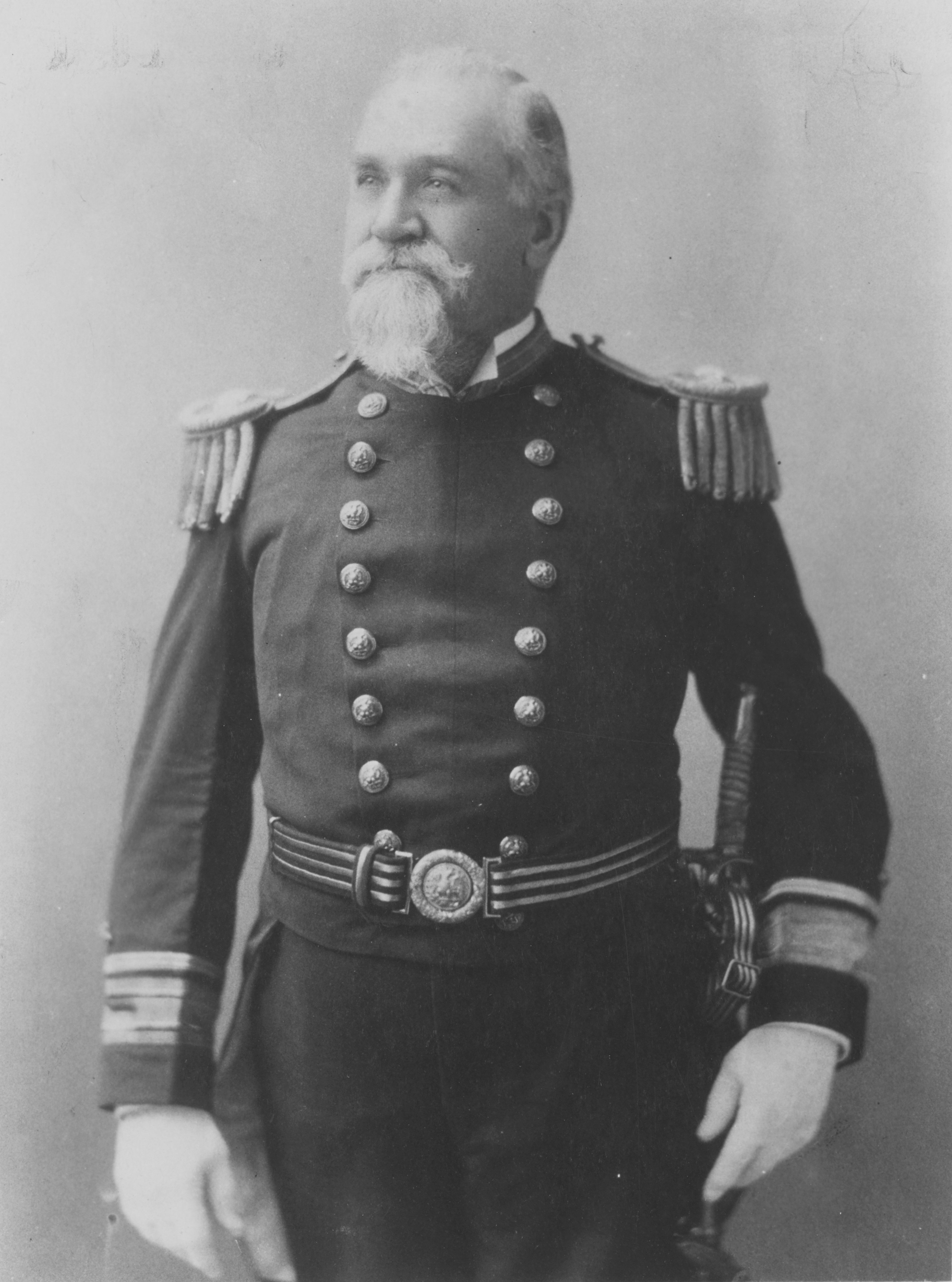
- Born: 18 January 1833; Chillicothe, Ohio, U.S.
- Died: 1 January 1897 (aged 63); Washington, D.C., U.S.
- Burial place: Arlington National Cemetery, Arlington, Virginia
- Military career
- Allegiance: United States
- Branch: United States Navy
- Service years: 1848–1894
- Rank: Rear Admiral
- Nickname: "Sailor Joe"
- Commands: USS Portsmouth; USS Macedonian; USS Saratoga; USS Richmond; Asiatic Squadron; Portsmouth Navy Yard; Washington Navy Yard; Pacific Squadron; Asiatic Squadron
- Conflicts: African Slave Trade Patrol; Seizure of slave ship Nightingale; American Civil War; Union blockade; 1874 Hawaiian riots; Sino-French War

Rear Admiral Joseph Salathiel Skerrett (18 January 1833 – 1 January 1897) was an officer in the United States Navy. He participated in one of the most successful actions of the African Slave Trade Patrol, fought in the American Civil War, twice played a prominent role in the history of the Kingdom of Hawaii, and served as commander of the Pacific and Asiatic Squadrons. He had the reputation of being the best navigator in the U.S. Navy in his day.

== Naval career ==
Skerrett was born in Chillicothe, Ohio, on 18 January 1833. As a child, he was a schoolmate of Lucy Webb, who later would become First Lady of the United States as the wife of President Rutherford B. Hayes, and the two were lifelong friends.

=== Early career ===
Skerrett was appointed as a midshipman on 12 October 1848. At the time, the United States Naval Academy curriculum required more years spent at sea than on shore at the school itself, and he went to sea immediately. During his midshipman years Skerrett was attached to the frigate USS Independence in the Mediterranean Squadron from 1848 to 1852 and to the sloop-of-war USS Marion off the west coast of Africa from 1852 to 1854, serving as navigator and officer of the watch on the two ships. He graduated from the academy in 1853 at the head of his class, being promoted to passed midshipman on 15 June 1854. He then served at the Naval Academy until 1855, and was promoted to master on 15 September 1855 and to lieutenant the following day.

Skerrett served aboard the flagship of the Home Squadron, the frigate USS Potomac, from 1855 to 1856, then aboard the sloop-of-war USS Falmouth in the Brazil Squadron from 1856 to 1859. Later in 1859, he was on the bark USS Release, serving as a stores ship in the North Atlantic Squadron.

=== African Slave Trade Patrol ===
From 1860 to 1862, Skerrett was assigned to the sloop-of-war USS Saratoga off the coast of Africa, and participated in the African Slave Trade Patrol. During his tour, Saratoga seized the slave ship Nightingale at the mouth of the Congo River at Cabinda on the night of 20–21 April 1861, freeing 961 African slaves. He was promoted to lieutenant commander on 16 July 1862.

=== American Civil War ===
While Skerrett was aboard Saratoga, the American Civil War broke out in April 1861. Eager to see action in the conflict, Skerrett requested a transfer that would allow him to see combat. United States Secretary of the Navy Gideon Welles, however, suspected that the sympathies of Skerrett's wife, the former Margaret Love Taylor (18 April 1838–28 November 1905), might lie with the Confederate States of America, and so he refused to place Skerrett in a combat position. Skerrett transferred to the Washington Navy Yard in Washington, D.C., in 1862 to serve as ordnance officer, but was so eager to get into action that he asked to be allowed to resign from the Navy and join a battery of artillery from Ohio. Welles threatened him with imprisonment at Fort Mifflin if he did not withdraw his resignation, and Skerrett remained on duty at the navy yard.

In 1863, Welles relented and allowed Skerrett to be assigned to the screw sloop USS Shenandoah, which participated in the Union blockade of Wilmington, North Carolina, and in hunting Confederate States Navy ships raiding merchant shipping in the West Indies. He then transferred to the gunboat USS Aroostook in the Western Gulf Squadron, which was enforcing the Union blockade of Confederate ports in Texas. Aboard Aroostook, he finally saw action on 27 June 1864 during combat against Confederate forts at the mouth of the Brazos River in Texas. He served aboard Aroostook in Texas waters through the end of the war in 1865.

=== Apprenticeship system ===
After leaving Aroostook, Skerrett did much to establish a system of apprenticeship in the U.S. Navy. He was assigned to the Naval Rendezvous in Washington, D.C., from 1866 to 1867 and was promoted to commander on 9 June 1867. He then was the commanding officer of the sloop-of-war USS Portsmouth, operating as an apprentice ship, from 1867 to 1868 before serving as head of the department of seamanship at the U.S. Naval Academy from 1868 to 1872. While at the academy, he commanded the sloops-of-war USS Macedonian and USS Saratoga on two practice cruises.

=== Surveying the Pacific ===
From 1872 to 1875, Skerrett commanded USS Portsmouth on a lengthy surveying voyage in the Pacific Ocean, which Portsmouth reached by steaming around Cape Horn, during which she encountered one of the worst storms ever experienced there, enduring 27 days of severe weather and drifting so far south that some of her men suffered frostbite. In the Pacific, Portsmouth operated as far north as the Territory of Alaska – where Skerrett rendered assistance to an Inuit settlement – and made the first accurate surveys of many parts of the Pacific for which accurate charts had been lacking, and the voyage was regarded at the time as one of the most conspicuous and successful in U.S. Navy history. Skerrett suffered problems with his eyesight during the voyage, and never fully regained his vision.

During her long Pacific surveying voyage, Portsmouth arrived at Honolulu in the Kingdom of Hawaii in 1874, joining the sloop-of-war USS Tuscarora and the Royal Navy corvette HMS Tenedos there. Skerrett impressed other ship captains by bringing Portsmouth safely to her mooring without the help of a trained pilot, a feat previously thought impossible in Honolulu Harbor. An Imperial Russian Navy admiral who witnessed the exploit sent Skerrett a letter complimenting him on the achievement.

Hawaii's King Lunalilo had died on 3 February 1874, and when the Hawaiian legislature met on 12 February to elect a new monarch, supporters of Queen Emma rioted when King Kalakaua was elected. The U.S. minister to Hawaii, H. A. Pierce, had anticipated trouble and established a pre-arranged signal for Skerrett and the commanding officer of Tuscarora, Commander George Belknap, to put United States Marines ashore to quell any disturbance. After the Hawaiian Minister of Foreign Affairs, Charles Reed Bishop, requested assistance in putting down the riot, 150 Marines from Portsmouth and Tuscarora joined a landing party of 70 men from Tenedos in dispersing the rioters and securing government buildings without bloodshed, and Kalakaua ascended the throne without further violence.

=== Hayes administration ===
Portsmouth returned from the Pacific voyage by again rounding Cape Horn and proceeding to New York City, arriving there in 1875. Skerrett then served a second tour at the Washington Navy Yard from 1875 to 1878, was promoted to captain on 5 June 1878, and was a lighthouse inspector in the First District in Maine from 1878 to 1881. His friendship with Lucy Webb Hayes made him a welcome visitor at the White House throughout the presidency of Rutherford B. Hayes (4 March 1877–4 March 1881), and at one point President Hayes offered to make him a bureau chief in the United States Department of the Navy. With what was described as characteristic modesty, Skerrett declined on the grounds that he was too junior in rank for the position.

=== Asiatic Squadron and Samoa ===
Skerrett returned to sea in 1881 as commanding officer of the flagship of the Asiatic Squadron, the steam sloop-of-war USS Richmond. Assuming command of Richmond at the Isthmus of Panama, he took her under orders of the Department of the Navy to Apia, Samoa, where he settled troubles the United States Consul was experiencing and began negotiations for the establishment of a coaling station at Pago Pago. He succeeded to command of the Asiatic Squadron in October 1883, and played a conspicuous role in protecting American interests in Indochina during the Sino-French War.

=== Naval Asylum and navy yard duty ===
Relinquishing command of the Asiatic Squadron in 1884, Skerrett moved on to a tour at the Philadelphia Naval Asylum in Philadelphia, Pennsylvania, from 1884 to 1888, serving as its governor from 1886 to 1888. He then was a member of the Naval Advisory Board during 1889 and was promoted to commodore on 4 August 1889. He then went on to be commandant of the Portsmouth Navy Yard in Kittery, Maine, from 1889 to 1890 and of the Washington Navy Yard from September 1890 to December 1892.

=== Pacific and Asiatic Squadrons ===
Skerrett's next assignment was command of the Pacific Squadron in Honolulu, which he assumed on 9 January 1893 and where he immediately became involved in unrest in the Kingdom of Hawaii again when revolutionaries overthrew Hawaii's last reigning monarch, Queen Liliuokalani, on 17 January 1893, with the assistance of the U.S. minister to Hawaii, John L. Stevens, and a landing party from the protected cruiser USS Boston. The raising of the United States flag in Honolulu to establish American protection of the islands spurred international opposition and the British and Japanese each sent a warship to Honolulu. Over the next several weeks, the new Provisional Government of Hawaii, consisting mostly of American residents of the islands, sought annexation by the United States, but shortly after assuming office on 4 March 1893, President Grover Cleveland, who disapproved of the overthrow, dispatched James H. Blount as a special envoy to Hawaii with authority to act on Cleveland's behalf. Blount ordered Skerrett to have the American flag hauled down on 1 April 1893 and directed that the provisional government receive no further U.S. government support. Skerrett wrote favorably about the new government on 25 July 1894, but was reminded not to favor it over others contending to govern the islands.

Perhaps because he favored the provisional government, Skerrett suddenly and unexpectedly was relieved of command of the Pacific Squadron by John Irwin on 6 November 1893 and replaced Irwin in command of the Asiatic Squadron, which Skerrett assumed on 11 December 1893. Skerrett was promoted to rear admiral on 16 April 1894. His mandatory retirement from the Navy upon reaching the age of 62 was scheduled for 18 January 1895, but he voluntarily requested an earlier retirement based on time in service in order to make room for Commodore Joseph P. Fyffe to be promoted to rear admiral before Fyffe's mandatory retirement at age 62 on 26 July 1894. Skerrett thus was placed on the retired list early, on 9 July 1894, allowing Fyffe to be promoted to rear admiral shortly before his own mandatory retirement.

== Retirement and death ==
In retirement, Skerrett resided in Washington, D.C., where he died of what was diagnosed as "paralysis" at midnight on 1 January 1897. He is buried with his wife and daughter, Edith W. Skerrett (8 November 1879–4 November 1956), at Arlington National Cemetery in Arlington, Virginia.

== Gallery ==
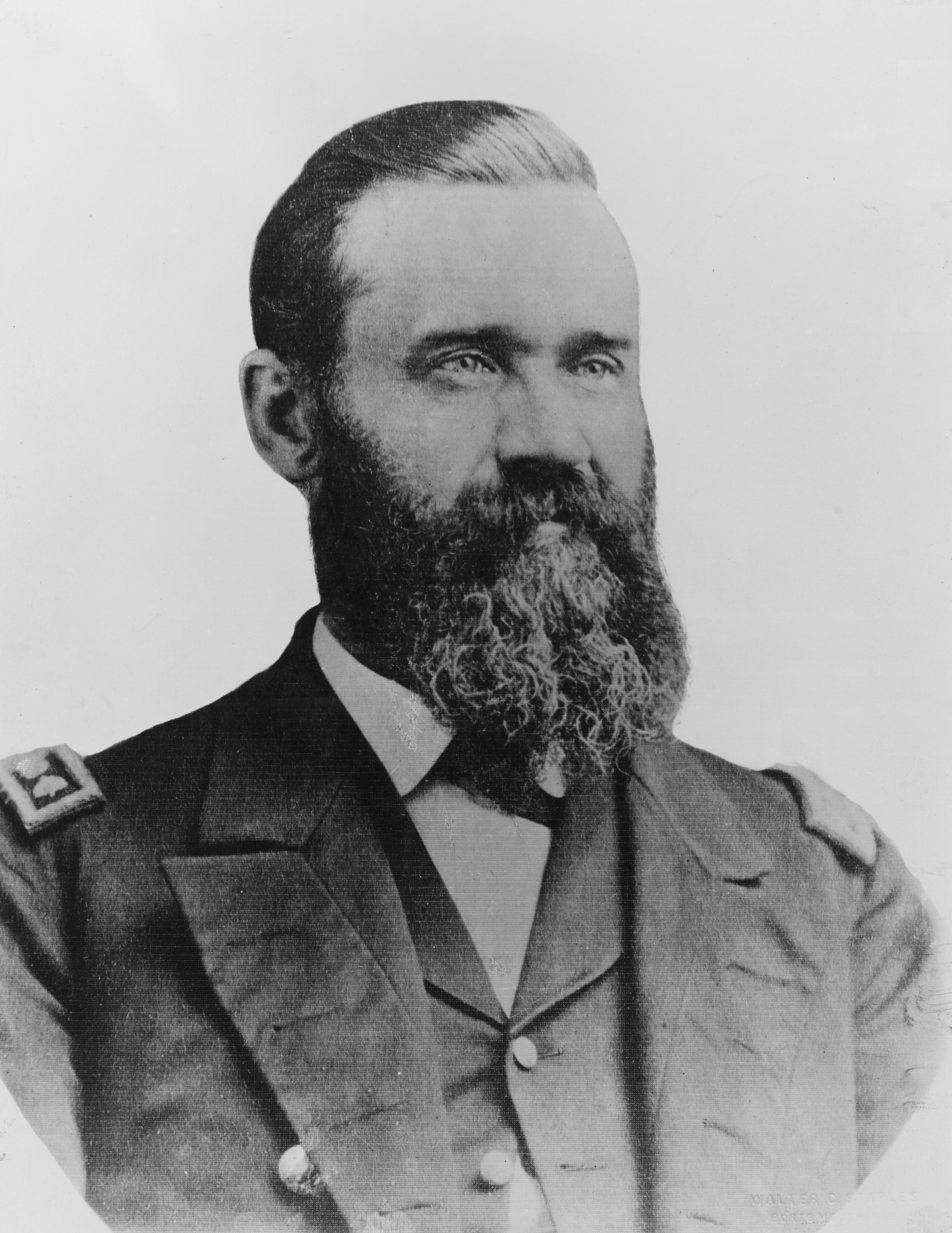
Skerret as a commander circa 1867.

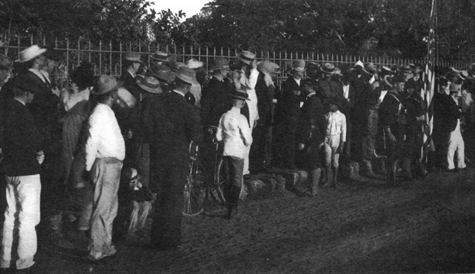
Skerrett reviews the men of the protected cruiser USS Boston in Palace Square in front of Iolani Palace in Honolulu, Hawaii, on 16 January 1893.

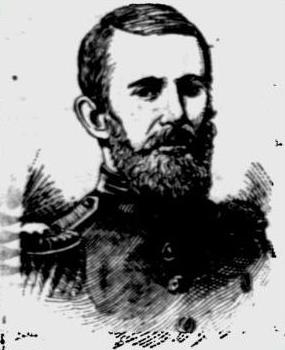
Sketch of Skerrett in the Kentucky New Era, June 1, 1894.

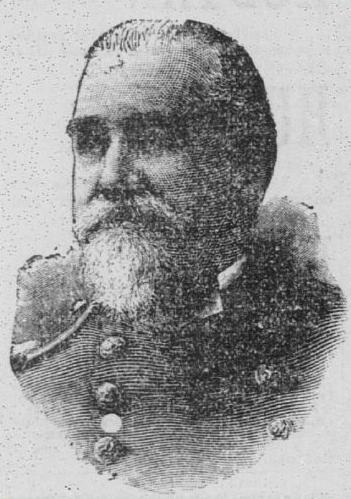
Illustration of Skerrett from The San Francisco Call, January 2, 1897.

== Notes ==
Military offices
Preceded by Peirce Crosby	Commander, Asiatic Squadron; 30 October 1883 – 19 December 1883	Succeeded by John L. Davis
Preceded by George Brown	Commander, Pacific Squadron; 9 January 1893 – 6 November 1893	Succeeded by John Irwin
Preceded by John Irwin	Commander, Asiatic Squadron; 11 December 1893 – 1 September 1894	Succeeded by Charles C. Carpenter
