= Ralph Chandler =

- Born: August 23, 1829; Batavia, New York, U.S.
- Died: February 9, 1889 (aged 59); Hong Kong
- Military career
- Allegiance: United States of America
- Branch: United States Navy
- Service years: 1845–1889
- Rank: Rear admiral
- Commands: USS Huntsville; USS Maumee; USS Don; USS Tallapoosa; Asiatic Squadron
- Conflicts: Mexican–American War; American Civil War • Second Battle of Fort Fisher

Ralph Chandler (23 August 1829 – 9 February 1889) was a rear admiral of the United States Navy. He saw action during the Mexican–American War and the American Civil War, and later served as commander of the Asiatic Squadron.

== Biography ==
Chandler was born in Batavia, New York, the son of Daniel Chandler, a lawyer. He joined the Navy as midshipman on 17 September 1845, and was sent to the Naval Academy. After graduation he was assigned to the razee Independence, flagship of the Pacific Squadron. He took part in Pacific-coast operations of the Mexican–American War, being in two engagements near Mazatlán.

Chandler served in the sloop Vincennes from 1849 to 1850, and was promoted to Passed midshipman in 1851. After a tour of duty at the Naval Academy in 1852, he served in the sloop St. Louis in the Mediterranean Squadron till 1855, in which year he became successively master and lieutenant.

Between 1855 and 1859 Chandler was engaged on the coast survey and the survey of the Paraná River, and was serving in the sloop Vandalia at the outbreak of the Civil War, seeing action in her at the battle of Port Royal in November 1861. The next year he was assigned to the steam-sloop San Jacinto of the North Atlantic Blockading Squadron, in which he was present at the engagement with the Sewell's Point batteries and the capture of Norfolk, Virginia.

On 16 July 1862, he was promoted to lieutenant-commander and commanded the screw steamer Huntsville in the East Gulf Blockading Squadron. Transferred to the steam-gunboat Maumee of the North Atlantic Squadron, Chandler fought his ship at the bombardment and fall of Fort Fisher and the capture of Wilmington in early 1865, receiving promotion to commander on 25 July 1866.

For two years he commanded the steamer Don, and was on ordnance duty at the Brooklyn Navy Yard in 1868. The next year Chandler commanded the steamer Tallapoosa. He was promoted to captain in 1874, and then to commodore in 1884, serving as commandant of the Brooklyn Navy Yard.

On 6 October 1886, Chandler was commissioned as rear-admiral and was ordered to relieve Rear-Admiral John L. Davis in command of the Asiatic Squadron. He died in Hong Kong of apoplexy in February 1889, and is buried in Hong Kong Cemetery.

He was married to Cornelia Redfield, with whom he had five children, three girls and two boys.

== Archives and records ==
- Ralph Chandler journal at Baker Library Special Collections, Harvard Business School.

Military offices
Preceded by John L. Davis	Commander, Asiatic Squadron; 22 November 1886–11 February 1889	Succeeded by George E. Belknap
