= Permanent change of station =

Type of U.S. military reassignment

In the United States Armed Forces, a permanent change of station (PCS) is the assignment, detail, or transfer of a member or unit to a different duty station under competent orders which neither specify the duty as temporary, nor provide for further assignment to a new station, nor direct return to the old station.

This is distinct from a permanent change of assignment (PCA), which describes the reassignment of active duty personnel to a new unit within the same military post.

This term is also used for other United States government employees, such as a Foreign Service Officer, special agent, diplomats, and other civilian, non-military personnel, being stationed in embassies and consulates around the world.

== Temporary duty assignment ==
In contrast, a temporary duty assignment is a shorter-term change of station, usually less than six months.

== Travel expenses ==
Traditionally, the cost of transportation for an officer and their family was initially paid for by the officer receiving the PCS orders, and they would be reimbursed upon arrival for expenses and pay en route. Lieutenant Commander Joseph P. Fyffe changed this custom in 1870 when he was assigned to travel from New England to San Francisco in order to take a new assignment. Since he had no funds for travel, he walked. He strapped his dress sword to a small suitcase and began walking from New England to San Francisco, sending a telegram each night showing his progress and nightly accommodations. After five days on the road, his shoes gave out, and he sent this telegram: "30 August 1870. En route X on foot X requested recruiting officer be authorized issue me new shoes X shoes fell apart noon today X entered Albany [New York] barefooted X will remain Seward Hotel two days awaiting answer X earned my keep as bartender X local rum far superior to that served in the US Navy X am sending sample X very respectfully Fyffe." The next day, the local recruiting station received a telegram from the Secretary of the Navy advancing funds for the transportation of officers to their new duty stations. "Pass following message to Lt. Comdr J. P. Fyffe USN now at Seward Hotel Bar Quote I strike my colors X United States Secretary of the Navy authorizes recruiting officer Albany issue you shoes and provide you quickest transportation from Albany to San Francisco X Even Chief Bureau of Navigation can laugh when outsmarted X unquote X Respectfully Bureau of Navigation".

== Financial planning ==
Permanent Change of Station moves present financial planning opportunities when executed strategically. Service members who perform a Personally Procured Move (PPM), formerly called a Do-It-Yourself (DITY) move, can receive reimbursement based on the government's estimated moving cost while controlling actual expenses.

PCS entitlements include:

- Dislocation Allowance (DLA) - One-time payment to offset relocation costs (varies by rank and dependent status)
- Temporary Lodging Expense (TLE) - Reimbursement for temporary housing during the move (up to 10 days)
- Mileage reimbursement - Payment for driving personal vehicles to the new duty station
- Advance pay - Optional loan against future pay to cover moving expenses
- Weight allowance - Maximum household goods weight the government will transport (based on rank)

The Joint Travel Regulations (JTR), maintained by the Defense Travel Management Office (DTMO), govern all PCS entitlements and are updated annually to reflect current rates and policies.
