= William H. Belpitt =

United States Navy sailor

William Henry Belpitt
- Born: May 3, 1860; Ryde, New South Wales
- Died: November 30, 1912
- Military career
- Allegiance: United States
- Branch: United States Navy
- Rank: Captain of the Afterguard
- Unit: USS Monocacy
- Awards: Medal of Honor

William Henry Belpitt (May 3, 1860 - November 30, 1912) was a United States Navy sailor and a recipient of the United States military's highest decoration, the Medal of Honor.

== Biography ==
Belpitt was born on May 3, 1859, in Ryde, New South Wales, Australia. By October 7, 1884, he was serving in the U.S. Navy as Captain of the Afterguard on the USS Monocacy. On that morning, while Monocacy was at Fuzhou, China, he jumped overboard and rescued a Chinese man whose canoe had capsized. For this action, Belpitt was awarded the Medal of Honor.

Belpitt's official Medal of Honor citation reads:

On board the U.S.S. Monocacy, Foochow, China, 7 October 1884. Jumping overboard from that vessel on the morning of this date, Belpitt sustained, until picked up, a Chinaman who had been thrown into the water by the capsizing of a canoe.

Belpitt later returned to Australia, he died on 29 November 1912 at Rookwood, NSW and was buried at Rookwood Catholic Cemeteries and Crematoria on 2 December 1912.

== See also ==
- List of Medal of Honor recipients in non-combat incidents
