= Isaac Rand Jackson =

American diplomat (1806–1842)

U.S. Chargé d'Affaires to Denmark
- In office May 20, 1841 – July 27, 1842
- Appointed by: William Henry Harrison
- Preceded by: Jonathan F. Woodside
- Succeeded by: William W. Irwin

Personal details
- Born: January 13, 1806
- Died: July 27, 1842 (aged 36) Copenhagen, Denmark
- Spouse: Louisa Catherine Carroll (m. 1833)
- Children: 5
- Parent(s): Abraham Jackson; Hannah Parsons

Isaac Rand Jackson (January 13, 1806 – July 27, 1842) was an American diplomat and collector.

== Early life ==
Jackson was born in 1804. He was a son of Hannah (née Parsons) Jackson (b. 1783) and Abraham Jackson (1748–1823) of Newburyport, a Loyalist during the Revolution who was an officer of Excise under King George III. Among his siblings was Ellen Jackson, who married George F. Pearson, Rear Admiral of the U.S. Navy who commanded the Pacific Squadron during the later part of the American Civil War.

His maternal grandparents were Capt. Jonathan Parsons and Hannah (née Giles) Parsons. After the death of Capt. Parsons, his grandmother married Stephen Cross, Esq.

== Career ==
Jackson was described as: "A man of brilliant parts, and of great promise; of highly cultivated mind, of refined taste, and remarkable for a pleasing and easy address, and graceful manners"

He practiced law in Philadelphia and collected "minerals, coins, statuary" and "his natural taste for these pursuits was cultivated and strengthened by a residence of two years in Europe, and a pedestrian tour of Switzerland." Jackson was appointed U.S. Chargé d'Affaires to Denmark on May 20, 1841, by President William Henry Harrison, who was his personal friend. He presented his credentials on October 12, 1841.

== Personal life ==
In 1833, Jackson was married to Louisa Catherine Carroll (1809–1869), the youngest daughter of Charles Carroll of Homewood (son of Charles Carroll of Carrollton, a signer of the Declaration of Independence) and Harriet (née Chew) Carroll (daughter of Benjamin Chew, Chief Justice of Pennsylvania). Together, they were the parents of:

- Louisa Carroll Jackson, who died young.
- Harriet Carroll Jackson (1835–1877), who married Leonard Douglas Hay Currie of the British Army in 1862.
- Charles Carroll Jackson (1836–1900), a merchant who married Minnie Coster and, after her death, Mary Van Nest, daughter of Abraham Van Nest, in 1882; he died of peritonitis aboard the S.S. Columbia.
- Oswald Chew Jackson (1838–1891), a merchant who married Ella Moore Willing, a daughter of Caroline Willing and Dr. Edward Peace of Philadelphia; he drowned at sea.
- Mary Ellen Jackson (1841–1909), who married Capt. Nalbro Frazier, son of Nalbo Frazier and uncle to Charles W. Ogden, in 1867.

Jackson died at his post in Copenhagen on July 27, 1842, after an illness of three weeks. His body was returned to America and he was buried at Laurel Hill Cemetery in Philadelphia.

Diplomatic posts
Preceded by Jonathan F. Woodside	U.S. Ambassador to Denmark; 1841-1842; As Chargé d'Affaires	Succeeded by William W. Irwin
