= William W. Irwin =

American politician (1803–1856)

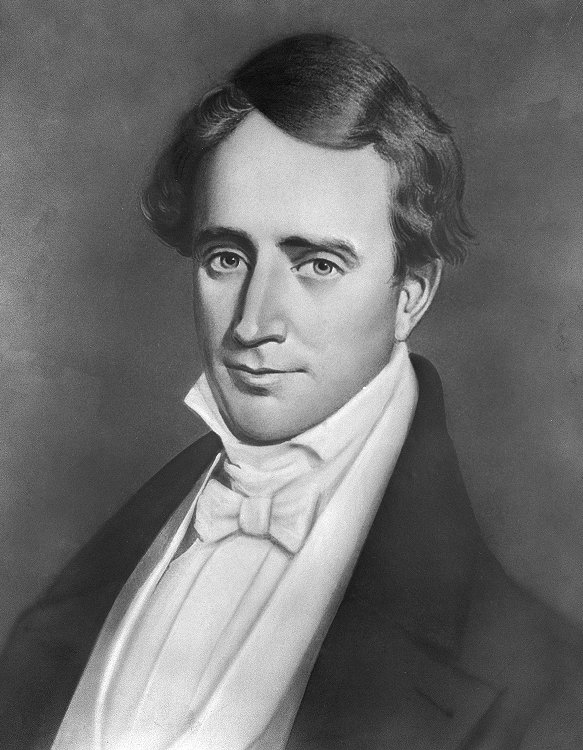
- Portrait of William W. Irwin, c. 1840–1841

United States Ambassador to Denmark
- In office 1843–1847
- Preceded by: Isaac Rand Jackson
- Succeeded by: Robert P. Flenniken

Member of the U.S. House of Representatives from Pennsylvania's 22nd district
- In office March 4, 1841 – March 4, 1843
- Preceded by: Henry Marie Brackenridge
- Succeeded by: Samuel Hays

10th Mayor of Pittsburgh
- In office 1840–1841
- Preceded by: William Little
- Succeeded by: James Thomson

Personal details
- Born: 1803 Pittsburgh, Pennsylvania, US
- Died: September 15, 1856 (aged 52–53) Pittsburgh, Pennsylvania, US
- Party: Whig
- Spouse(s): Frances Everallyn Rose Irwin (?–1836, her death); Sophia Arabella Bache (1839–1856, his death)
- Children: John Irwin; Agnes Irwin; Robert Walker Irwin
- Education: University of Pittsburgh; Allegheny College

William Wallace Irwin (1803 – September 15, 1856) was Mayor of Pittsburgh and a Whig member of the U.S. House of Representatives from Pennsylvania.

== Early life ==
William Irwin was born in Pittsburgh in 1803, and as a boy earned the lifelong nickname "pony Irwin" because of his habit of riding a pony everywhere he went. He graduated from the Western University of Pennsylvania, now known as the University of Pittsburgh, in 1824. He was also a graduate of Allegheny College. He became a member of the Allegheny County bar on May 6, 1828, and by 1835 was serving as the president of the Western University's alumni association. He ran successfully for Allegheny County District Attorney in 1838.

== Marriage and family ==
Irwin's first wife was Frances Everallyn Rose Irwin, the niece of Illinois Supreme Court justice Theophilus W. Smith and aunt of bridge engineer Charles Shaler Smith. They were the parents of four children, including United States Navy Rear Admiral John Irwin.

After his first wife's death, Irwin married again on February 28, 1839, in Philadelphia, Pennsylvania. His second wife was Sophia Arabella Bache, born November 14, 1815, at Philadelphia, Pennsylvania, and died on March 24, 1904. She was the daughter of Richard Bache, Jr., who served in the Republic of Texas Navy and was elected as a Representative to the Second Texas Legislature in 1847, and Sophia Burrell Dallas, the daughter of Arabella Maria Smith and Alexander J. Dallas, an American statesman who served as the U.S. Treasury Secretary under President James Madison. She was also granddaughter of Sarah Franklin Bache and Richard Bache, the great-granddaughter of Benjamin Franklin, and a niece of George Mifflin Dallas, the 11th Vice President of the United States, serving under James K. Polk.

Irwin had five children with Bache, including educator Agnes Irwin and American businessman and the Kingdom of Hawaii's Minister to Japan, Robert Walker Irwin.

== Pittsburgh politics ==
Upon being elected mayor in 1840 Irwin oversaw the expansion of infrastructure and government in the city to catch up with the region's rapid expansion. Under his administration four additional wards were added to the city.

== United States House of Representatives ==
Irwin used his term as mayor as a touchstone for his race as a representative for U.S. Congress. He was elected as a Whig to the Twenty-seventh Congress. He was not a candidate for reelection in 1842.

== Later life ==
After his term in Congress, Irwin was United States Ambassador to Denmark 1843-1847. He died in Pittsburgh in 1856. Interment in Allegheny Cemetery.

== See also ==
- List of mayors of Pittsburgh

Political offices
Preceded by William Little	Mayor of Pittsburgh; 1840–1841	Succeeded by James Thomson
U.S. House of Representatives
Preceded by Henry Marie Brackenridge	Member of the U.S. House of Representatives from Pennsylvania's 22nd congressional district 1841-1843	Succeeded by Samuel Hays
Diplomatic posts
Preceded by Isaac Rand Jackson	U.S. Ambassador to Denmark; 1843-47; As Chargé d'Affaires	Succeeded by Robert P. Flenniken
