= Charles W. Ogden =

American real estate investor (1873–1956)

Charles Walton Ogden, Jr. (November 19, 1873 – January 20, 1956) was an American real estate investor and philanthropist.

== Early life ==
Ogden was born on November 19, 1873, in New York City. He was a son of Charles Walton Ogden (1843–1895), a member of the firm of Ogden & Wallace, dealers in iron and steel, and Louisa Helena (née Frazier) Ogden (b. 1841). His younger sister was Mary Frazier Ogden.

His paternal grandparents were Grace and Joseph Ogden, had been born in England in 1808. Through his father, he was "distantly connected with the Goelet family, but was not related to the well-known New-York family of Ogdens." His maternal grandparents were Nalbro Frazier and Mary Eyre (née Robinson) Frazier. His maternal uncle, Capt. Nalbro Frazier married Mary Ellen Jackson (a daughter of Isaac Rand Jackson, U.S. Chargé d'Affaires to Denmark in the 1840s).

He attended the Cutler School before attending Columbia University, from where he graduated in 1895.

== Career ==
Ogden had a real estate business, located at 25 Beaver Street in Lower Manhattan, for many years. In 1921, he served as a director of the Metropolitan Trust Company (among such notables as Beverly Chew, Ogden Mills, Herbert Parsons, and Harold I. Pratt).

After his retirement, he devoted his time to management of charitable groups, serving as the Secretary of the New York Protestant Episcopal Mission Society and was an honorary vice president of the Community Service Society of which he had been a board member since its inception in 1939 in addition to holding a number of posts with hits predecessor organization, the Charity Organization Society. He was a member of the vestry of the Protestant Episcopal Church of the Holy Communion for more than sixty years and was treasurer of its Home for the Aged. Ogden also served as vice president of the Clear Pool Camp, a division of the Madison Square Boys Club in Kent, Connecticut.

== Personal life ==
In 1897, Ogden was married to Ida Gertrude Little (b. 1877), a daughter of John Mason Little and Helen (née Beal) Little. Ida's uncle was Boston architect James Lovell Little Jr. Together, Charles and Ida had a summer house in Swampscott, Massachusetts, known as "The Den" on Little's Point, and in Rowayton, Connecticut known as "Shenemere", and were the parents of:

- Charles Walton Ogden III (1898–1901), who died young.
- Louisa Helena Ogden (1900–1989), who in 1929 married Caspar Crowninshield de Gersdorff (1901–1982), a son of Carl Auguste de Gersdorff and Helen (née Crowninshield) de Gersdorff and grandson of prominent artist and author Frederic Crowninshield; his sister Josephine was the wife of Frederick Bradlee
- Ida Gertrude Ogden (b. 1901).

Ogden died on January 20, 1956, at 14 East 79th Street, his residence in New York City.
