= John L. Davis =

John Lee Davis
- Born: September 3, 1825; Carlisle, Indiana, U.S.
- Died: March 12, 1889 (aged 63); Washington D.C., U.S.
- Burial place: Rock Creek Cemetery; Washington D.C., U.S.
- Relatives: John Wesley Davis (father)
- Military career
- Allegiance: United States
- Branch: United States Navy
- Service years: 1841–1886
- Rank: Rear Admiral
- Commands: Wissahickon; Montauk; Sassacus; Asiatic Squadron
- Conflicts: American Civil War • Battle of the Head of Passes • Second Battle of Fort Sumter • First Battle of Fort Fisher • Second Battle of Fort Fisher

John Lee Davis (September 3, 1825 – March 12, 1889) was a Rear Admiral of the United States Navy, who served during the American Civil War, and later commanded the Asiatic Squadron.

== Biography ==
Davis was born in Carlisle, Indiana, one of seven children born to John Wesley Davis (1799–1859), a doctor and politician, and Ann Hoover (1801–1859).

Davis entered the Navy as a midshipman on 9 January 1841, and was warranted passed midshipman on 10 August 1847.

While serving as acting lieutenant aboard the sloop Preble of the East India Squadron, he commanded one of the boats that boarded a piratical Chinese junk off Macao in November 1849, with another officer and sixteen men, and captured the vessel and crew.

He was commissioned lieutenant on 15 September 1855, and was attached to the Gulf Blockading Squadron in 1861. As executive officer of the gunboat Water Witch he took part in engagements with the Confederate ram Manassas at the battle of the Head of Passes on 12 October 1861.

He was commissioned lieutenant commander on 16 July 1862, and in command of the gunboat Wissahickon, attacked Fort McAllister on 19 November. His ship was pierced by a solid shot below water. The leak was stopped temporarily, and after the action the vessel was taken on shore and patched at the falling of the tide. He attacked the fort again on 27 January and 1 February 1863, and on 28 February when the privateer Rattlesnake was destroyed. On 19 March he sank the blockade-runner Georgiana when she attempted to enter Charleston harbor. He was then given command of the ironclad monitor Montauk and took part in the engagements with Forts Sumter, Gregg, Moultrie, and Battery Bee, at the beginning of September 1863, and in the attacks on Fort Sumter and Fort Moultrie in November 1863.

In 1864-65 he commanded the steamer Sassacus of the North Atlantic Blockading Squadron. Sassacus towed the powder boat Louisiana from Norfolk to Fort Fisher in December, and was engaged during the First and Second Battles of Fort Fisher in December 1864 and January 1865. Davis also took part in attacks on Fort Anderson on the Cape Fear River on 18 February; and on Fort Strong on 20 and 21 February. His ship was struck under the waterline, but the leak was kept under control until dark, and then effectually stopped.

He was commissioned commander on 25 July 1866, and commanded the sloop Wyoming from 1871 on the North Atlantic Station. Davis was promoted to captain on 14 February 1873, and was a member of the Lighthouse Board in 1876, and of the Board of Inspection in 1882. He was promoted to commodore on 4 February 1882, and commanded the Asiatic Squadron in 1883, and on 30 October 1885, received his commission as rear admiral. In November 1886, Davis was relieved of his command of the Asiatic Squadron and placed on the retired list.

Davis died in Washington, D.C., in 1889, and is buried at the Rock Creek Cemetery there.

== Personal life ==
Davis married Francis Latta Robinson (1836–1920) on December 12, 1855, in Carlisle, Indiana. They had one child, Katherine L. Davis (1860–1950).

== See also ==
Military offices
Preceded by Joseph S. Skerrett	Commander, Asiatic Squadron; 19 December 1883–22 November 1886	Succeeded by Ralph Chandler
