= USS Ethan Allen (1859) =

Gunboat of the United States Navy

History

United States
- Name: USS Ethan Allen
- Launched: 1859
- Acquired: 23 August 1861
- Commissioned: 3 October 1861
- Decommissioned: 26 June 1865
- Stricken: before 20 July 1865
- Fate: sold, 20 July 1865

General characteristics
- Tonnage: 556
- Length: 153 ft 6 in (46.79 m)
- Beam: 35 ft 1 in (10.69 m)
- Draft: 13 ft (4.0 m)
- Propulsion: sail
- Speed: 12 knots (22 km/h; 14 mph)
- Complement: 90
- Armament: six 32-pounder guns

USS Ethan Allen was a 556-ton bark acquired by the Union Navy during the beginning of the American Civil War, and used as a gunboat in support of the blockade of Confederate waterways.

== History ==
Ethan Allen was built in 1859 at Boston, Massachusetts; purchased by the Navy 23 August 1861; and commissioned 3 October 1861, Acting Volunteer Lieutenant W. B. Eaton in command. During her first wartime cruise, 27 October 1861 to 30 March 1863, Ethan Allen patrolled in the Gulf of Mexico, capturing eight prizes, and destroying extensive salt works along the Florida coast, thus hampering the Confederate war effort and civilian economy. Ethan Allen returned to Boston for repairs, and between 22 June and 28 October 1863, cruised along the New England coast to protect merchantmen and fishing craft from Southern cruisers. On 9 November, she sailed from Boston to join the South Atlantic Blockading Squadron off Port Royal, South Carolina, 26 November. During the following year and a half, she patrolled the Carolina coast, and for several months served as practice ship for junior officers of her squadron. She arrived at Portsmouth, New Hampshire, 5 June 1865, and was decommissioned there 26 June 1865, and sold 20 July 1865.
