= David B. Harmony =

United States Navy admiral (1832–1917)

David Butts Harmony
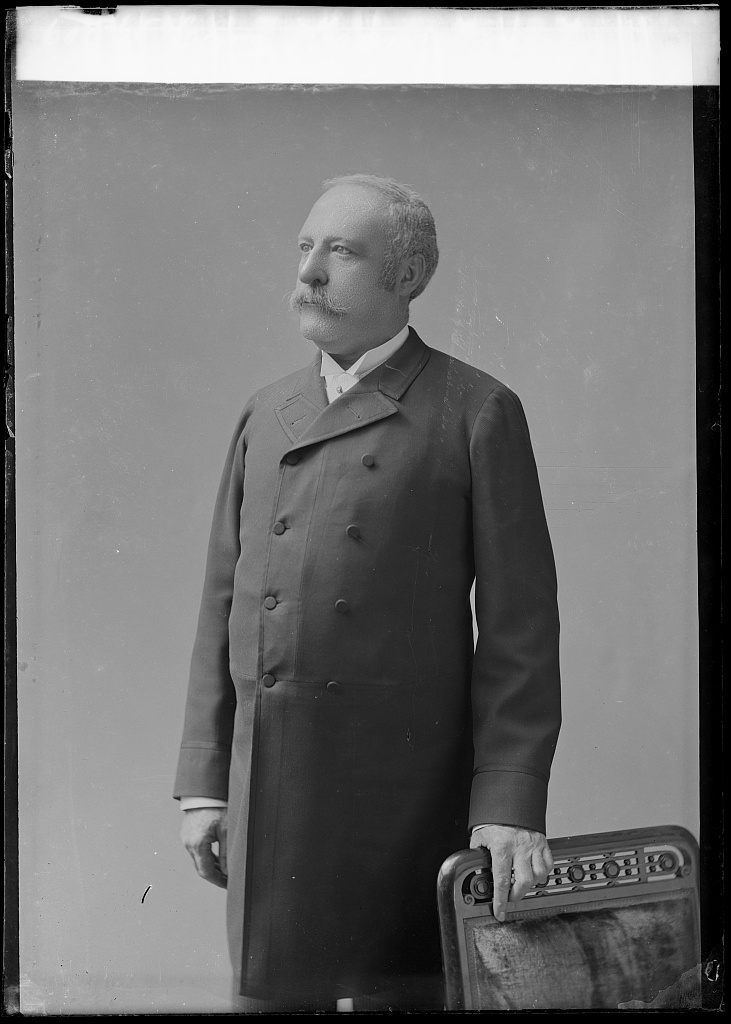
- David B. Harmony
- Born: September 2, 1832; Easton, Pennsylvania, US
- Died: November 2, 1917 (aged 85)
- Burial place: Arlington National Cemetery
- Military career
- Allegiance: United States of America
- Branch: United States Navy
- Service years: 1847–1893
- Rank: Rear admiral
- Commands: USS Sebago; USS Frolic; USS Portsmouth; USS Kearsarge; USS Plymouth; USS Powhatan; USS Tennessee; USS Colorado
- Conflicts: American Civil War

David Butts Harmony (September 2, 1832 – November 2, 1917) was a rear admiral of the United States Navy, who served during the American Civil War.

Harmony was born in Easton, Pennsylvania, and entered the navy as a midshipman on April 7, 1847, was promoted to passed midshipman on June 10, 1852, became lieutenant in 1855, and lieutenant commander in 1862.

Promoted to commander in 1866, Harmony then served at the New York Navy Yard, and then in 1867–69 commanded the Frolic in the European Squadron, one of the vessels of Admiral Farragut's squadron.

Harmony returned to the New York Navy Yard in 1869–72, was promoted to captain in 1875, and commanded the sloops Portsmouth, Kearsarge and Plymouth, and the frigates Powhatan, Tennessee and Colorado, between 1878 and 1883.

David B. Harmony in 1865

Harmony was a member of Navy Department's Examining and Retiring Boards 1883–84, was promoted to commodore in 1885, and served as Chief of the Bureau of Yards and Docks, 1885–89, and was Chairman of the Lighthouse Board, 1889–91. He retired on June 26, 1893.

Harmony died on November 2, 1917, and was buried in Section 2 of Arlington National Cemetery.

Some of his letters from the 1870s, written while on active duty, are archived at the National Archives and Records Administration in Washington, D.C.

== Papers from the Mixsell-Mathews Estate ==
A selection of David Harmony's official papers, from the estate of Isabel Mixsell-Mathews, can be viewed here:

- David B. Harmony Papers 1847–1869
- David B. Harmony Papers 1870–1877

Military offices
Preceded by George E. Belknap	Commander, Asiatic Squadron; 20 February 1892–7 June 1893	Succeeded by John Irwin
