= USS Palos (1865) =

Gunboat of the United States Navy

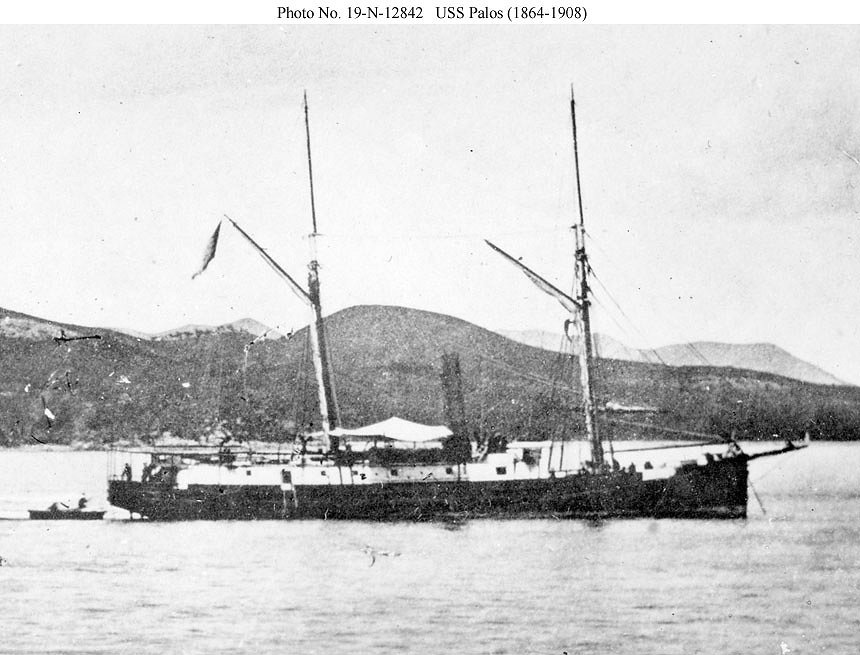
- USS Palos

History

United States
- Launched: 1865
- Commissioned: 11 June 1870
- Decommissioned: 25 January 1893
- Fate: Sold, 25 January 1893

General characteristics
- Displacement: 420 tons
- Length: 137 ft (42 m)
- Beam: 26 ft (7.9 m)
- Draught: 9 ft 10 in (3.00 m)
- Speed: 10.35 kts
- Armament: 2 guns

The first USS Palos was a fourth-rate, iron-screw tug in the United States Navy during the late 19th century. She was named for Palos de la Frontera in Spain, where Christopher Columbus started his first voyage to America.

Palos was built by James Tetlow, Chelsea, Massachusetts, in 1865 and was put into service as yard tug at the Boston Navy Yard the following year. Placed in ordinary in 1869, the tug was converted to a gunboat and commissioned 11 June 1870, Lieutenant C. H. Rockwell in command.

Departing Boston 20 June for the Asiatic Station, Palos steamed across the Atlantic Ocean and through the Mediterranean Sea, becoming the first American warship to transit the Suez Canal on 11–13 August, and she arrived at Singapore, via Aden and Ceylon, on 25 September. Following a brief stay at that port, the gunboat put out for Hong Kong and for the next 22 years operated on the Chinese and Japanese coasts and inland waters.

In May 1871, she sailed from Shanghai for Nagasaki, Japan, and thence Korea as part of the Asiatic Squadron under Rear Admiral John Rodgers carrying U.S. Minister to China Frederick Low on a diplomatic mission to the "Hermit Kingdom". While engaged in surveying the Salee River on 1 June, she was fired upon by a Korean fort, two men from the squadron being wounded before return fire stopped the attack. Admiral Rodgers waited 10 days for an official apology and then ordered Palos, gunboat Monocacy, and a 650-man landing party into action, the two warships supporting an assault and capture of the main Korean fort 10 June and the taking of four others the next day. The squadron departed the Korean coast on 3 July without renewing negotiations.

Palos continued her operations on the Asiatic Station into 1891, cruising the Chinese and Japanese coasts, visiting the open treaty ports and making occasional voyages up the Yangtze and Canton Rivers. From June to September 1891, anti-foreign riots up the Yangtze forced the warship to make an extended voyage as far as Hankou, 600 miles upriver. Stopping at each open-treaty port, the gunboat co-operated with naval vessels of other nations and repaired damage. She then operated along the north and central Chinese coast and on the lower Yangtze until June 1892, when she sailed for Nagasaki, arriving on the 19th.

Palos was condemned as unfit for further service there on 6 July and was decommissioned and sold at auction 25 January 1893. She was subsequently scrapped.
