= USS Monocacy (1864) =

Mohongo-class gunboat

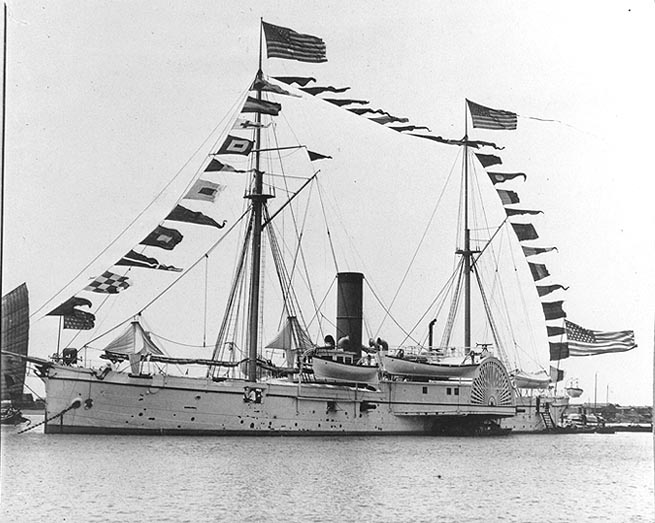
- Monocacy in 1902

History

United States
- Name: USS Monocacy
- Builder: A. & W. Denmead & Son, Baltimore, Maryland
- Launched: 14 December 1864
- Completed: 1865
- Commissioned: 1866
- Stricken: 22 June 1903
- Fate: Sold, 1903

General characteristics
- Type: Gunboat
- Displacement: 1,370 long tons (1,392 t)
- Length: 265 ft (81 m)
- Beam: 35 ft (11 m)
- Draft: 9 ft (2.7 m)
- Propulsion: Steam engine
- Speed: 11.2 knots (20.7 km/h; 12.9 mph)
- Complement: 159
- Armament: 6 × guns

The first USS Monocacy was a sidewheel gunboat in the United States Navy. She was named for the Battle of Monocacy.

Monocacy was launched by A. & W. Denmead & Son, Baltimore, Maryland, on 14 December 1864; sponsored by Miss Ellen Denmead; completed late in 1865; and placed in service in 1866. Future Governor of American Samoa Henry Francis Bryan served as her commander for some of her sailing days.

== Service history ==
Assigned to the Asiatic Squadron, Monocacy remained there until 1903, a period of service so long that the light-draft gunboat was given the nickname "Jinricksha of the Navy".

After patrol duty through 1867, Monocacy joined her squadron in representing the U.S. Government at the opening of the ports of Osaka and Hyōgo, Japan, 1 January 1868. In December, she surveyed the Inland Sea between Nagasaki and Osaka to locate appropriate sites for lighthouses, another step in the realization of American commercial trade with isolationist Japan. The gunboat spent most of 1869 and 1870 patrolling off Japan in the years following the Meiji Restoration in 1867.

After repairs at Shanghai, Monocacy began charting the Yangtze River on 23 March 1871. By April she was underway for Nagasaki, Japan, to participate in a five-ship survey expedition to the Salee River, Korea, and, while there, attempt contact with representatives of the Kingdom of Korea. After Korean shore batteries attacked screw tug USS Palos near Chemulpo, a landing party of 576 sailors and 110 marines stormed a series of forts along the Salee River on 10 June, losing three killed and seven wounded. The expedition retired in July. In September, the gunboat resumed her navigation of the Yangtze before returning to Shanghai 4 February 1872.

For the last quarter of the 19th century, Monocacy cruised along the coasts of Japan, Korea, and China, docking in Japan through the winter months. On 7 October 1884, while at Fuzhou, China, Captain of the Afterguard William H. Belpitt rescued a Chinese man from drowning, for which he was awarded the Medal of Honor. From 23 October until 11 November 1899, the veteran ship carried the U.S. Minister to China as she visited the open ports of the Yangtze River.

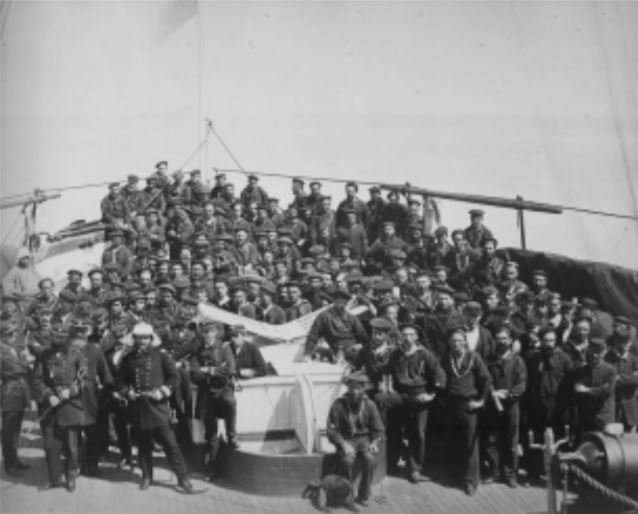
Officers and crew of the USS Monocacy during the 1871 expedition to Korea.

In 1900, Monocacy became involved in the Boxer Rebellion. On 14 June, she captured seven small craft off Tongku, China. The foreign persecutions ended with the capture of Peking, on 14 August, by the China Relief Expedition, and Monocacy docked at Taku Bar, China, where she remained through the razing of the Taku forts in accordance with the formal settlement signed in September 1901.

On 22 June 1903 Monocacy was struck from the Navy list and sold to Hashimoto and Son, Nagasaki, Japan.
