= Agnes Irwin (educator) =

American educator (1841–1914)

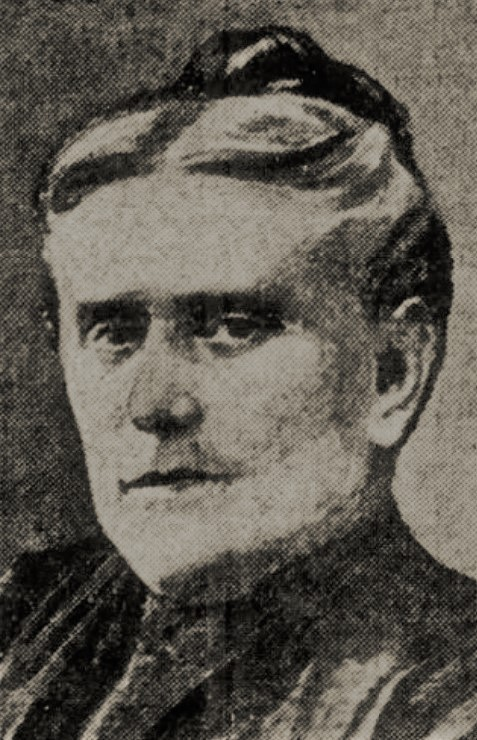
- Agnes Irwin, c. 1909
- Born: December 30, 1841; Washington, D.C.
- Died: December 5, 1914 (aged 72); Philadelphia, Pennsylvania
- Occupation: American educator
- Known for: First dean of Radcliffe College (1894-1909)

Agnes Irwin (December 30, 1841 – December 5, 1914) was an American educator, best known as the first dean of Radcliffe College (1894–1909). Prior to that, she served as the principal of the West Penn Square Seminary for Young Ladies in Philadelphia (later renamed as the Agnes Irwin School).

== Formative years ==
Born in Washington, D.C., on December 30, 1841, Agnes Irwin was a daughter of United States Congressman William Wallace Irwin (1803–1856) and Sophia Arabella (Bache) Irwin (1815–1904), a native of Philadelphia, Pennsylvania, who was a daughter of Richard Bache, Jr. of the Republic of Texas Navy and Second Texas Legislature (1847), and Sophia Burrell Dallas, daughter of Arabella Maria Smith and Alexander J. Dallas, an American statesman who served as the U.S. Treasury Secretary under President James Madison.

Agnes Irwin was also a great-granddaughter of Sarah Franklin Bache and Richard Bache, and the great-great-granddaughter of Benjamin Franklin, as well as a grandniece of George Mifflin Dallas, the 11th Vice President of the United States, serving under James K. Polk.

During her formative years, Agnes Irwin was raised in Copenhagen, Denmark, where her father was serving as Minister Resident to Denmark. Following the completion of his service to the United States in that role, she returned with her family to Washington, D.C., where she subsequently became a witness to the impact that the American Civil War had on the nation's capital during its first year (1861). After relocating to what she and her parents hoped would be a safer area for her in New York in 1862, she arrived around the same time as the New York City draft riots were beginning.

== Academic career ==
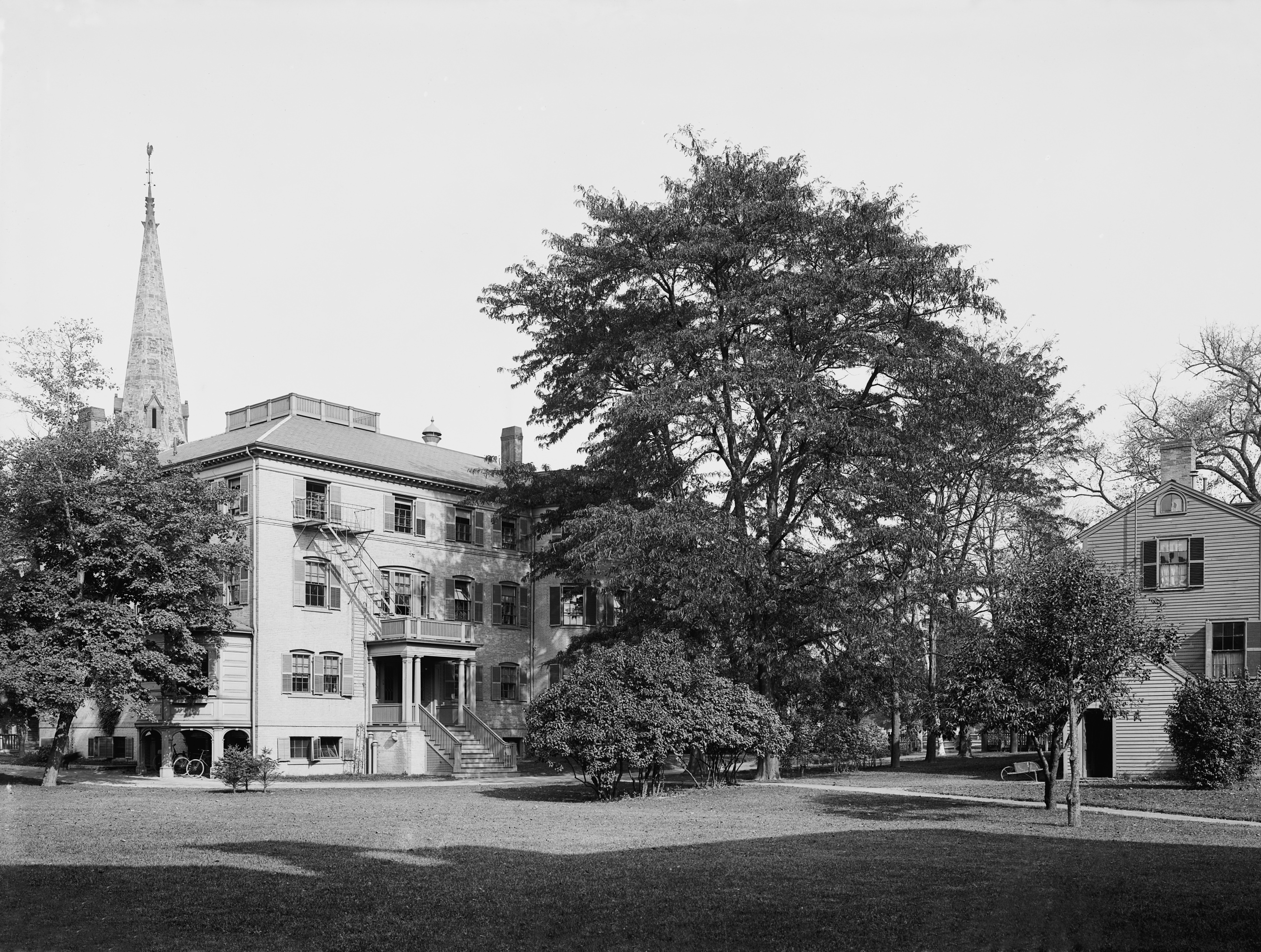
Gymnasium and Fay House, Radcliffe College, c. 1904

In 1869, Irwin took over the administration of West Penn Square Seminary for Young Ladies (1869–1894) in Philadelphia and transformed it into an institution of disciplined teaching. The school was ultimately renamed in her honor. Believing in the importance of higher education for women, she was among the first to prepare students for the examinations given by Harvard College, to credential women for teaching, and by Bryn Mawr College, to qualify for entrance. The success of The Agnes Irwin School won Irwin the support of Harvard’s president, Charles William Eliot, and led to her selection as first dean of Radcliffe College in 1894, a position she held until September 1, 1909.

During her tenure as dean at Radcliffe College, the number of graduates increased from fewer than one hundred to more than one thousand. In addition, multiple major buildings were added, including Agassiz House, Barnard, Bertram, Grace Hopkinson Eliot and Whitman Halls, Greenleaf House, four dormitories, a gymnasium, and the library. Irwin also personally paid for two exam proctors to assist with Helen Keller's education—one to monitor Keller and the other to watch Keller's proctor.

In 1900, Irwin was appointed by Governor Roger Wolcott to the Board of Managers for Massachusetts at the Paris Exposition. She was then appointed by Governor John L. Bates to the Massachusetts State Commission for the Adult Blind in 1903, a post she held until 1905.

From 1911-1914, Irwin served as the first president of the Headmistresses’ Association of Private Schools.

=== Awards and other honors ===
Irwin was the recipient of 3 Honorary Degrees:

- 1895 – Degree Unknown – Western University of Pennsylvania (Now University of Pittsburgh)
- 1898 – LittD. – University of Pennsylvania
- 1906 – Hood 8 Degree bestowed by Andrew Carnegie – University of St. Andrews

== Illness, death and interment ==
Irwin fell ill with pneumonia in Philadelphia in 1914, and died at her home there at 2027 De Lancey Place on December 5, 1914. She was interred at Philadelphia's Saint James the Less Episcopal Churchyard.

== Legacy ==
Irwin was the subject of a 1934 biography by Agnes Repplier.

Today, The Agnes Irwin School continues to be a leader in girls' education with approximately 600 girls enrolled in pre-kindergarten to twelfth grades. The school is currently located in suburban Rosemont, Pennsylvania, ten miles west of Philadelphia. In September 2015, English primatologist and anthropologist Jane Goodall gave a presentation to the student body, explaining her pioneering research work with chimpanzees and discussing the continuing need for environmental activism.
