= Asiatic Squadron =

U.S. Navy squadron positioned in East Asia (1868–1902)

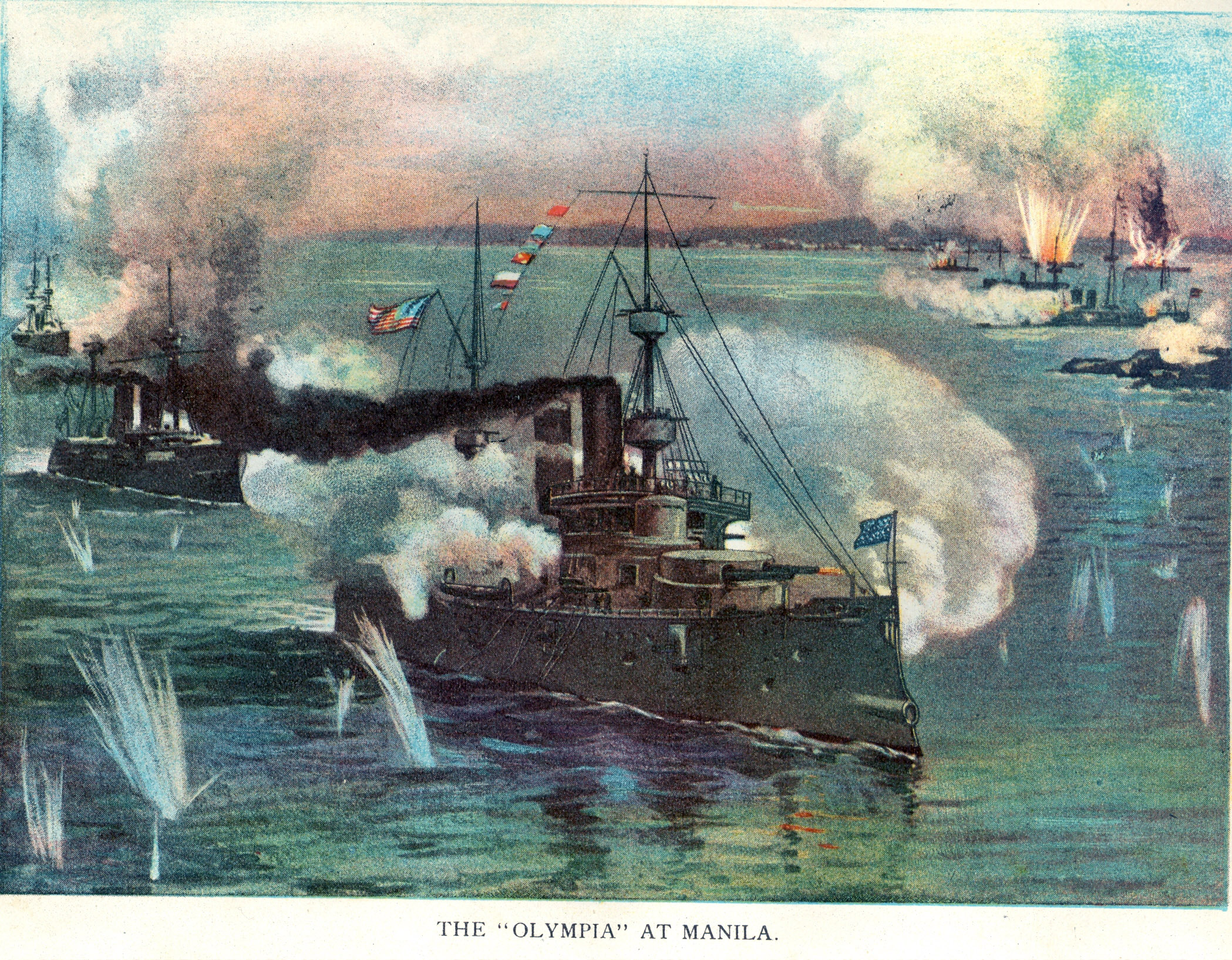
- The Asiatic Squadron defeating the Spanish fleet in the Battle of Manila Bay on 1 May 1898
- Active: 1868–1902
- Allegiance: United States
- Branch: United States Navy
- Type: Naval squadron

The Asiatic Squadron was a squadron of United States Navy warships stationed in East Asia during the latter half of the 19th century. It was created in 1868 when the East India Squadron was disbanded. Vessels of the squadron were primarily involved in matters relating to American commerce with China and Japan, though it participated in several conflicts over 34 years of service until becoming the Asiatic Fleet in 1902.

== History ==
=== Korean Expedition ===
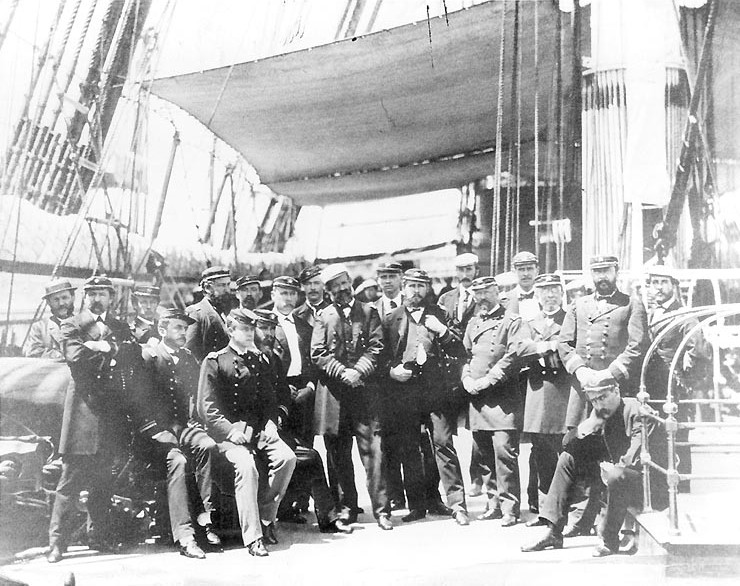
Officers and men of USS Colorado during the Korean Expedition in 1871

In May 1871, Rear Admiral John Rodgers went to Korea, commanding an expedition of five Asiatic Squadron vessels, the screw frigate USS Colorado, the screw sloops-of-war USS Alaska and USS Benicia, the sidewheel gunboat USS Monocacy, and the screw tug USS Palos. The objective of the operation was to ascertain the fate of the merchant ship SS General Sherman, establish trade relations, and receive an assurance from the Joseon government that shipwrecked American sailors would be safely treated should they become stranded in Korea.

On 1 June 1871, while Rear Admiral Rodgers was negotiating in Inchon, one of the Selee River forts opened fire on Palos as she traversed the Gangwha Straits. In the following engagement, Palos and Monocacy bombarded the fort until it was silenced and on 10 June 1871, the expedition attacked in force. Five of the six hostile forts were captured and destroyed, over 200 Koreans were killed and dozens of cannons were captured. Although the Americans won a military victory, the Koreans refused to sign a trade treaty until 1882.

=== Spanish–American War ===
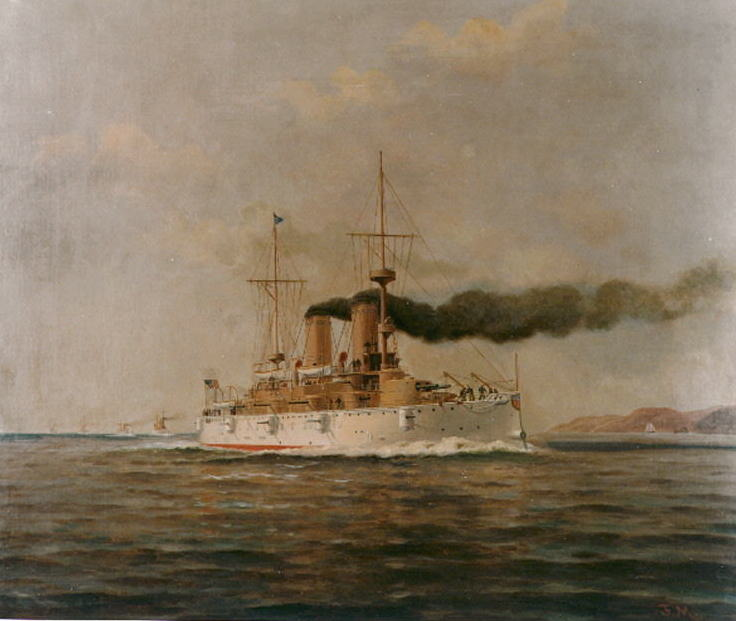
USS Olympia leading a column of cruisers, painting by Francis Muller

On 27 April 1898, the squadron, composed of the protected cruisers USS Olympia (the flagship of the squadron's commander, Commodore George Dewey), USS Baltimore, USS Raleigh, and USS Boston, the gunboats USS Petrel and USS Concord, and the United States Revenue Cutter Service cutter USS McCulloch, sailed from Mirs Bay, China, to the Philippine Islands to participate in the Spanish–American War.

In the Battle of Manila Bay on 1 May 1898, the squadron destroyed the Spanish fleet in the Philippines, and effectively took control of Manila Bay. Eight Spanish ships were sunk and over 150 killed while the Americans suffered only slight damage. Vessels of the squadron also fought the Spanish in the battle to capture Manila. Naval gunfire on the Spaniards' left flank helped American troops take the city without severe losses. The Philippines became an American possession.

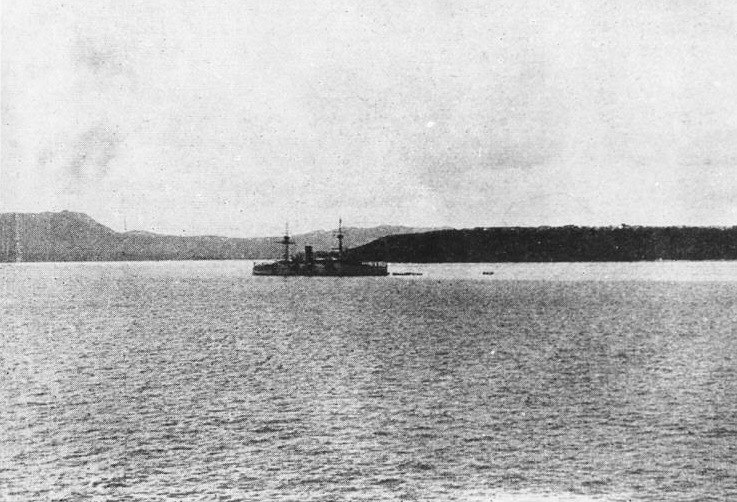
USS Charleston taking possession of Guam in June 1898 during the Spanish–American War

On 20 June 1898, the Asiatic Squadron protected cruiser USS Charleston captured Guam from the Spanish without resistance, beginning the American possession of the island.

=== Philippine–American War ===
The Asiatic Squadron participated in the Philippine–American War from 1899 until its disbandment in 1902. American naval forces operated by sending landing parties ashore and by providing them with naval gunfire support. From 1899 to 1902, the squadron conducted several missions against the Filipinos.

Dewey's squadron engaged in naval operation against the Filipinos during and after the 1898 Battle of Manila against the Spanish. At the beginning of the Philippine–American War in February 1899, several American warships supported the occupation of the Philippine Islands. At the same time, the monitor USS Monadnock, the protected cruisers Charleston, and the gunboats Concord, USS Callao, and Laguna de Bay bombarded Filipino positions during the Battle of Caloocan. Over 300 Filipinos were killed in action and three times as many wounded, with many of the casualties attributed to accurate naval gunfire. USS Petrel and USS Boston shelled Panay Island on 11 February 1899, and, on 22 February 1899, a landing party from Petrel occupied Cebu. In October 1899, Petrel joined Callao in supporting American troops in the Battle of Noveleta by bombarding Filipino troop concentrations at Noveleta before a shore party made its assault.

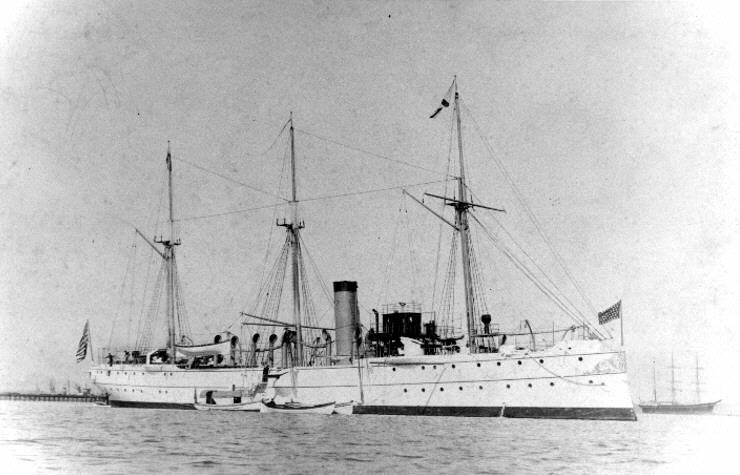
USS Concord off San Francisco, in the 1890s

Many of the captured Spanish gunboats used in the Philippine–American War were manned by United States Army troops and operated together with United States Navy forces. In mid-April 1899, General Henry Lawton led an expedition of 1,500 men in several cascoes and three gunboats to a place near Santa Cruz to find another former Spanish gunboat which was being used by the Filipinos; during the ensuing Battle of Santa Cruz, the American force captured six steam launches along with two cascoes, and later took the Filipino gunboat, which the Filipinos reportedly had disarmed so that they could use her guns on land, without a fight.

Baltimore and Petrel served at the Battle of Iloilo, in which about 1,000 Filipinos were defeated when the two warships bombarded the fort there and sent United States Marines and sailors ashore. Only minor skirmishing occurred on land because the Filipinos retreated and burned the town as they left.

On 7 May 1899, Laguna de Bay and another gunboat bombarded Sexmoan and routed the Filipinos there. Later that day, the gunboats fought at Guagua, where they bombarded Filipino positions in the town and sent men ashore to fight on the ground. Again the Filipinos retreated and set several buildings on fire as they went.

In June 1899, American gunboats silenced an artillery piece during the Battle of Zapote River, which ended with an American victory.

USS Vicksburg in 1898

In the summer of 1899, American gunboats started patrolling Subic Bay. During a routine patrol, the collier USS Zafiro entered Subic Bay and came under fire from a shore battery protecting Olongapo. Zafiro withdrew to Cavite and reported the incident to headquarters. In response, Charleston engaged the battery. On 23 September 1899, Charleston, Concord, the monitor USS Monterey, and Zafiro steamed into Subic Bay and destroyed the battery in the Battle of Olongapo. Then, a company of U.S. Marines and sailors landed and took control.

Charleston grounded on an uncharted reef off Camiguin Island on 2 November 1899. She sustained heavy damage, and her crew abandoned ship and escaped to the nearby island where they made camp. Charleston's launch was sent out for help and, after ten days of being marooned, the American sailors were rescued by the gunboat USS Helena.

On 7 November 1899, Helena bombarded San Fabian in Lingayen Gulf and covered the landing of 2,500 American troops there.

Asiatic Squadron gunboats took part in the Battle of Mabitac in June 1900, where they bombarded Filipino forces while U.S. Army troops attacked their fortifications. In a bloody frontal assault the American troops were repulsed and the Filipinos won the battle.

In November 1900, the Asiatic Squadron auxiliary cruiser USS Yosemite was heavily damaged in a typhoon while in Apra Harbor, Guam. Due to damage to her screw, her crew scuttled her. They were picked up later by the collier USS Justin.

The gunboat USS Vicksburg assisted land forces in capturing the Filipino rebel Emilio Aguinaldo in March 1901 at Palawan Island. Later the gunboat USS Isla de Luzon supported the operation which led to the capture of the Filipino general Vicente Lukbán on Samar in November 1901.

=== Boxer Rebellion ===
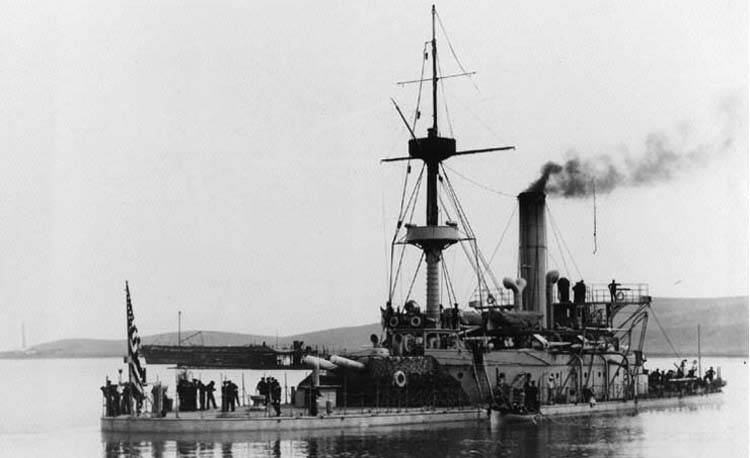
USS Monterey served in China during the Boxer Rebellion

During the Boxer Rebellion, the Asiatic Squadron participated in the China Relief Expedition in 1900. At the time, Peking was home to many foreigners who were under siege by Boxer rebels. An international force including U.S. Marines and U.S. Navy sailors of the Asiatic Squadron slowly fought their way to take control of Tientsin away from the Boxers in order to relieve the Siege of the International Legations at Peking.

=== Asiatic Fleet ===
In 1902, the Asiatic Squadron was upgraded in status, becoming the United States Asiatic Fleet. Except for a period from early 1907 until 28 January 1910 when it was downgraded to the status of First Squadron, United States Pacific Fleet, the Asiatic Fleet replaced the Asiatic Squadron in defending American interests in East Asia from 1902 until February 1942.

== Commanders ==
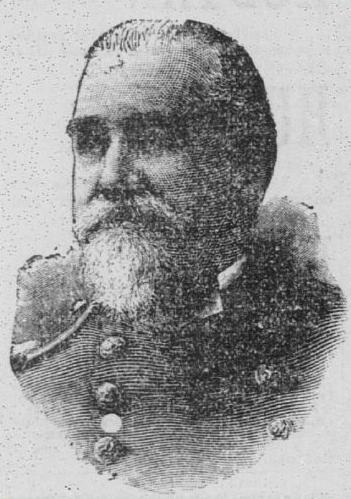
Illustration of RADM Joseph S. Skerrett from The San Francisco Call, 2 January 1897

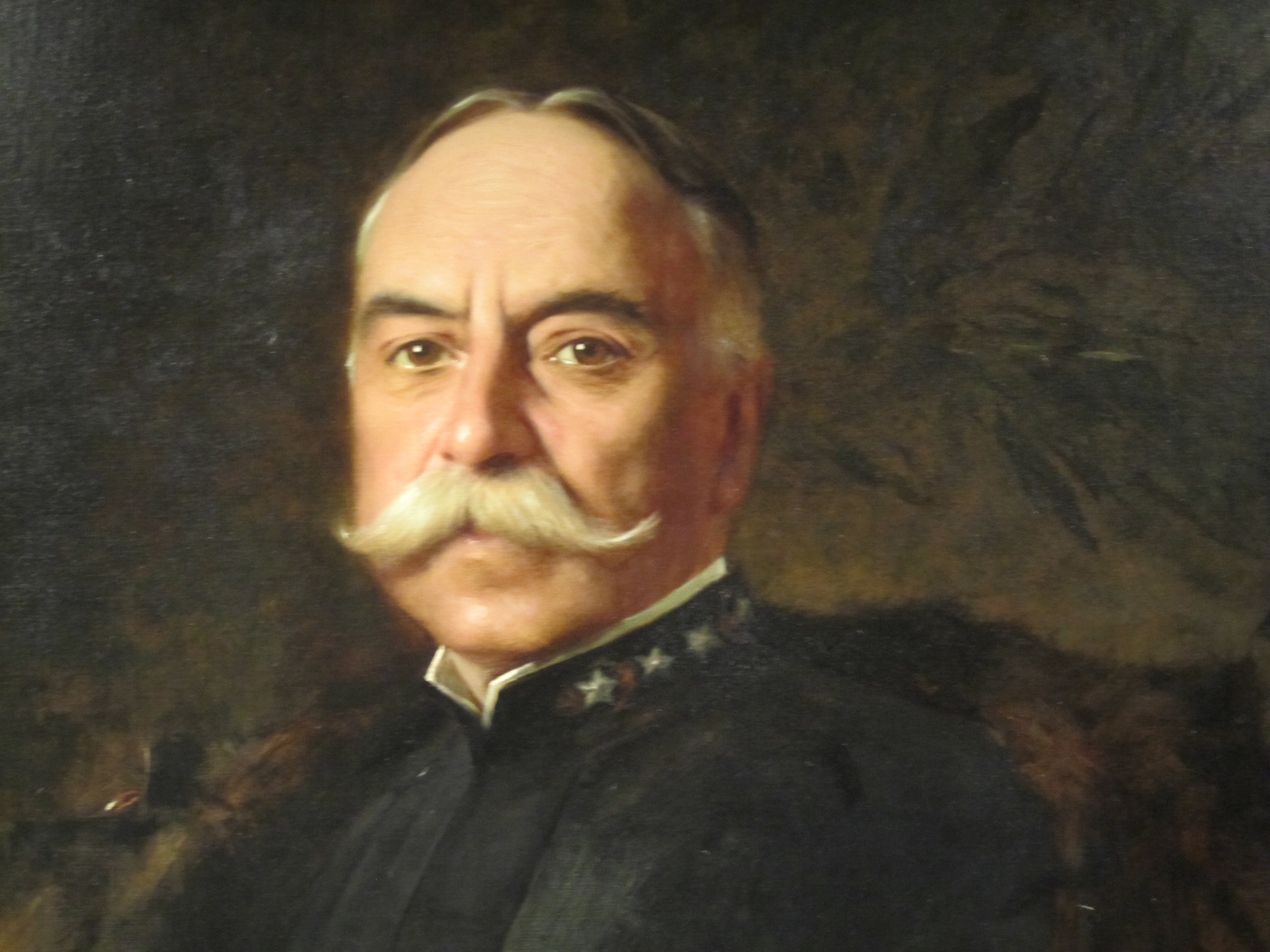
Admiral George Dewey, commander of the squadron at the Battle of Manila Bay, as he appears at the National Portrait Gallery in Washington, D.C.

Successive Commanders-in-Chief of the Asiatic Squadron were as follows:

- Rear Admiral Henry H. Bell ( – 11 January 1868)
- Commodore John R. Goldsborough (11 January 1868 – 18 April 1868)
- Rear Admiral Stephen C. Rowan (18 April 1868 – 19 August 1870)
- Rear Admiral John Rodgers (19 August 1870 – 12 May 1872)
- Rear Admiral Thornton A. Jenkins (1 September 1872 – 12 December 1873)
- Rear Admiral Enoch Greenleafe Parrott (12 December 1873 – 12 January 1874)
- Commodore Edmund Colhoun (12 January 1874 – 29 May 1874)
- Rear Admiral Alexander Mosely Pennock (29 May 1874 – 24 June 1875)
- Commander Robert F. R. Lewis (24 June 1875 – 16 August 1875)
- Rear Admiral William Reynolds (16 August 1875 – 12 August 1877)
- Captain Jonathan Young (12 August 1877 – 4 October 1877)
- Rear Admiral Thomas H. Patterson (12 August 1877 – 11 September 1880)
- Rear Admiral John M. B. Clitz (11 September 1880 – 21 April 1883)
- Rear Admiral Peirce Crosby (21 April 1883 – 30 October 1883)
- Captain Joseph S. Skerrett (30 October 1883 – 19 December 1883)
- Commodore/Rear Admiral John L. Davis (19 December 1883 – 22 November 1886)
- Rear Admiral Ralph Chandler (22 November 1886 – 11 February 1889)
- Rear Admiral George E. Belknap (4 April 1889 – 20 February 1892)
- Rear Admiral David B. Harmony (20 February 1892 – 7 June 1893)
- Rear Admiral John Irwin (11 June 1893 – 11 December 1893)
- Rear Admiral Joseph S. Skerrett (11 December 1893 – 1 September 1894)
- Commodore/Rear Admiral Charles C. Carpenter (1 September 1894 – 21 December 1895)
- Commodore Frederick V. McNair Sr. (21 December 1895 – 3 January 1898)
- Commodore/Rear Admiral/Admiral George Dewey (3 January 1898 – 20 May 1899)
- Commodore/Rear Admiral Albert S. Barker ( 20 May 1899 – 20 June 1899)
- Rear Admiral John C. Watson (20 June 1899 – 19 April 1900)
- Rear Admiral George C. Remey (19 April 1900 – 1 March 1902)
- Rear Admiral Frederick Rodgers (1 March 1902 – 29 October 1902)

== Gallery ==
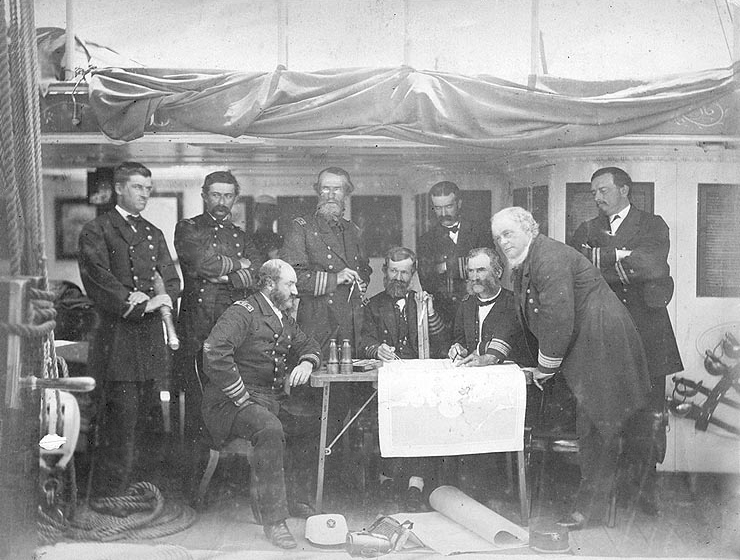
A posed photograph of Asiatic Squadron officers holding a council of war aboard USS Colorado off Korea in June 1871 prior to the Korean Expedition. Squadron commander Rear Admiral John Rodgers leans over the table at right.

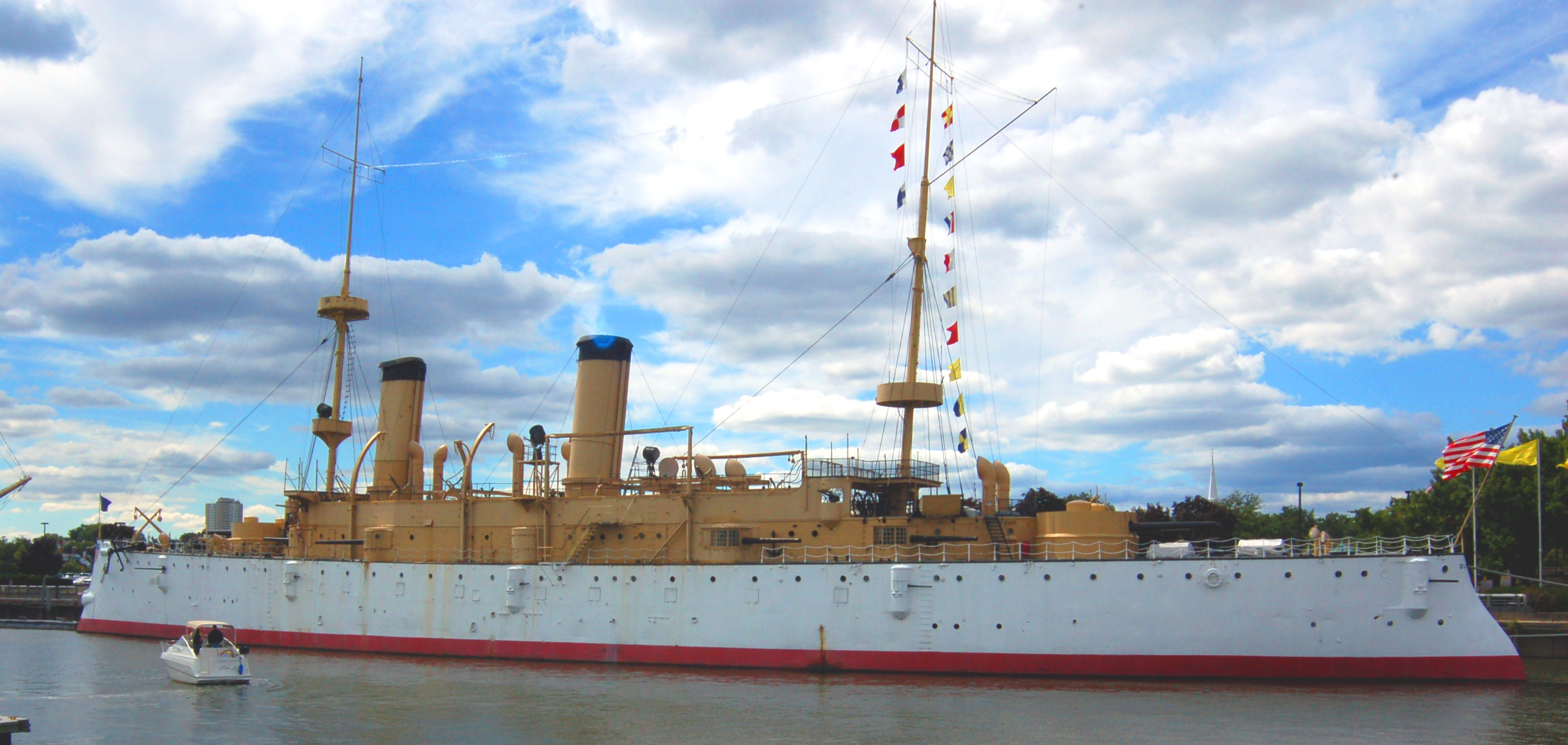
USS Olympia at the Independence Seaport Museum in 2007

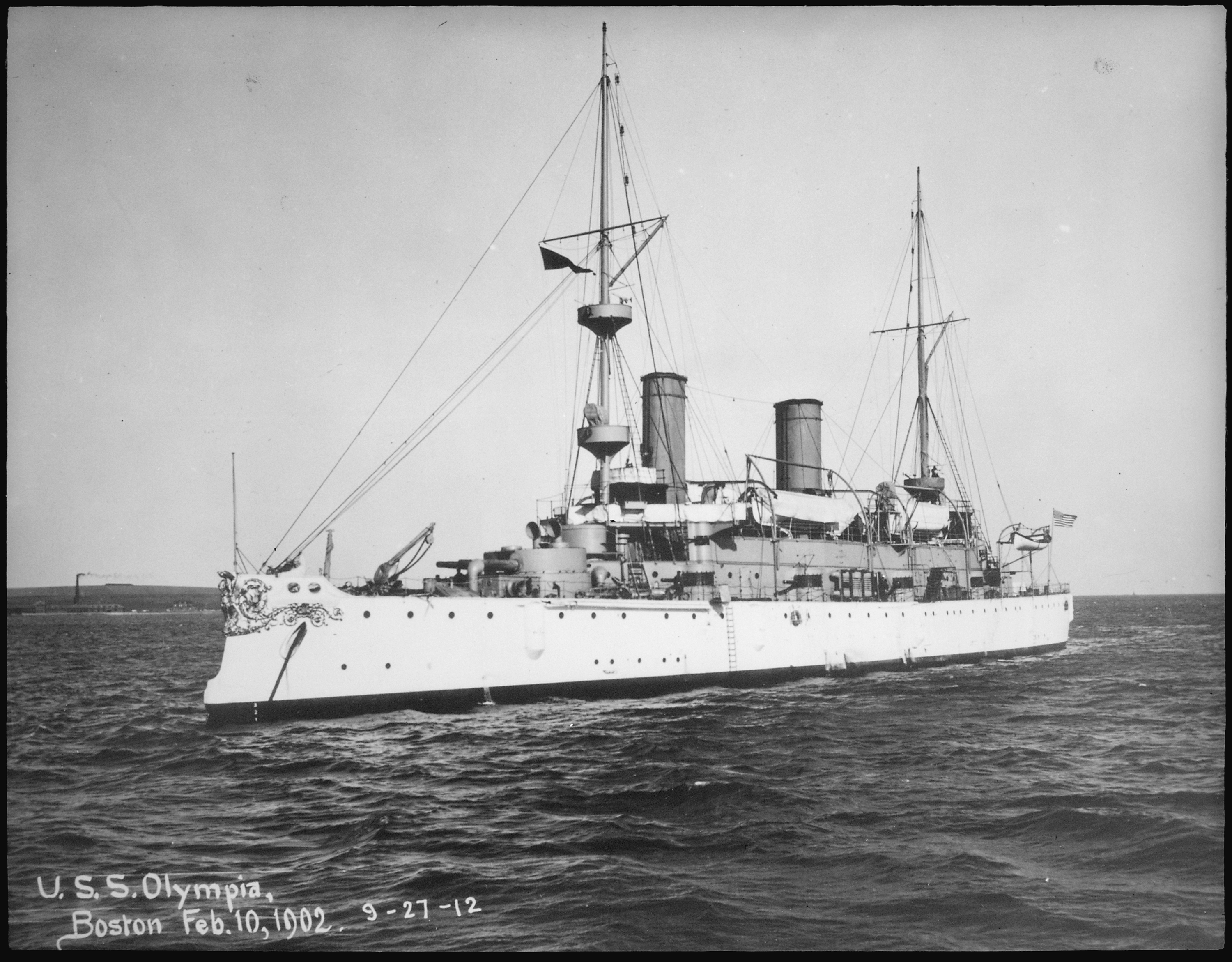
USS Olympia in 1902

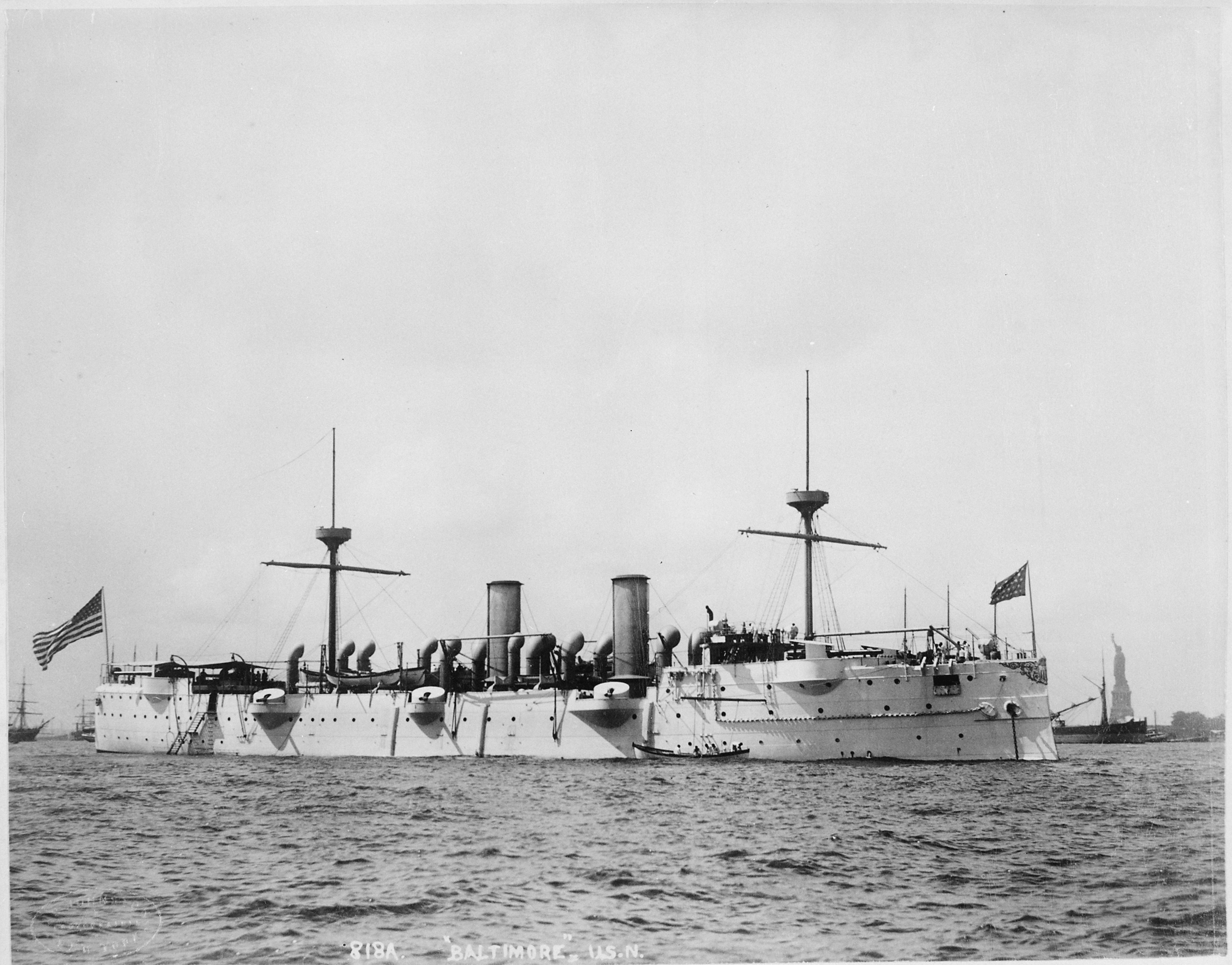
USS Baltimore in 1891

== See also ==
- China Squadron and Fleet
- Far East Fleet (United Kingdom)
