= Bordelon =

Bordelon is a surname. Notable people with the surname include:

- Gerald Bordelon (1962–2010), American convicted murderer
- Guy Bordelon (1922–2002), Korean War flying ace
- Ken Bordelon (born 1954), American football player
- Melinda Bordelon (1949–1995), American painter and illustrator
- William J. Bordelon (1920–1943), US Marine and recipient of the Medal of Honor
  - USS Bordelon, the ship named for him
