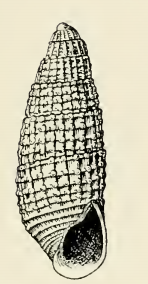
- Drawing of a shell of Odostomia tyleri

Scientific classification
- Kingdom: Animalia
- Phylum: Mollusca
- Class: Gastropoda
- Family: Pyramidellidae
- Genus: Odostomia
- Species: O. tyleri

Binomial name
- Odostomia tyleri Dall & Bartsch, 1909

Synonyms
- Chrysallida tyleri (Dall & Bartsch, 1909); Odostomia (Chrysallida) tyleri Dall & Bartsch, 1909 (basionym)

= Odostomia tyleri =

Species of gastropod

Odostomia tyleri is a species of sea snail, a marine gastropod mollusc in the family Pyramidellidae, the pyrams and their allies.

This species is named after Prof. J.M. Tyler.

== Description ==
The robust shell is subdiaphanous to milk-white. The whorls of the protoconch are smooth. They are immersed in the first of the succeeding turns, above which only a part of the decidedly tilted edge of the last whorl projects. The seven whorls of the teleoconch are flattened, slightly excurved at the summit, scarcely at all contracted at the periphery and moderately shouldered at the summit. They are marked by very strong, rounded, axial ribs, of which 14 occur upon the first, 16 upon the second, 18 upon the third, 20 upon the fourth, 22 upon the fifth, and 24 upon the penultimate turn. In addition to the axial ribs the whorls are marked by spiral cords, less strong than the ribs, the junctions of which with the ribs render them tuberculate. Of these cords, four occur upon all the whorls but the penultimate and last, which have five between the sutures. The spaces enclosed between the ribs and cords are deep square pits. The posterior cord is on the summit of the whorl and is a little stronger than the rest, rendering the whorls, which are excurved, crenulated. The sutures are well marked but not channeled. The periphery and the somewhat attenuated base of the body whorl are well rounded. They are marked by seven strong, rounded, spiral cords which diminish successively in size and spacing from the periphery to the umbilical area. The channels which separate the cords are marked by numerous fine axial riblets. The aperture is irregularly pyriform, and somewhat effuse anteriorly. The posterior angle is obtuse. The outer lip is thin, showing the external sculpture within. The columella is stout, twisted, curved, and slightly reflected. It is reinforced by the base and provided with a strong fold at its insertion. The parietal wall is covered by a strong callus, which practically renders the peritreme complete.

== Distribution ==
The type species was found in the Pacific Ocean off the Bay of Panama.
