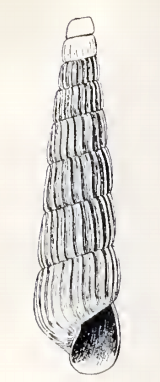
- Drawing of a shell of Turbonilla ima

Scientific classification
- Kingdom: Animalia
- Phylum: Mollusca
- Class: Gastropoda
- Family: Pyramidellidae
- Genus: Turbonilla
- Species: T. ima

Binomial name
- Turbonilla ima Dall & Bartsch, 1909

Synonyms
- Turbonilla (Turbonilla) ima Dall & Bartsch, 1909

= Turbonilla ima =

Species of gastropod

Turbonilla ima is a species of sea snail, a marine gastropod mollusk in the family Pyramidellidae, the pyrams and their allies.

== Description ==
The large, yellowish-white shell has an elonogate-conic shape. The early whorls are eroded). The length of the eight remaining whorls of the teleoconch measures 9.4 mm. They are situated very high between the sutures. They are slightly rounded, feebly shouldered at the summit, and somewhat contracted at the sutures. They are marked by low, rounded, somewhat sinuous, vertical axial ribs, of which there are 24 upon the penultimate whorl and 20 upon the second above it. The intercostal spaces are about one and one-half times as wide as the ribs, shallow, and scarcely depressed below the general surface. The intercostal spaces and ribs between the sutures are marked by rather strong lines of growth, which gives them a decidedly crinkly appearance. The sutures are well impressed. The periphery and the base of the body whorl are well rounded. They are marked by the feeble continuations of the axial ribs. The aperture is large. The posterior angle is acute. The outer lip is thin, showing the external markings within. The columella is slender, decidedly sinuous, and not reflected.

== Distribution ==
The type specimen was found in the Pacific Ocean off the Bay of Panama.
