= USS Belknap (CG-26) =

Guided missile cruiser (1964–1995)

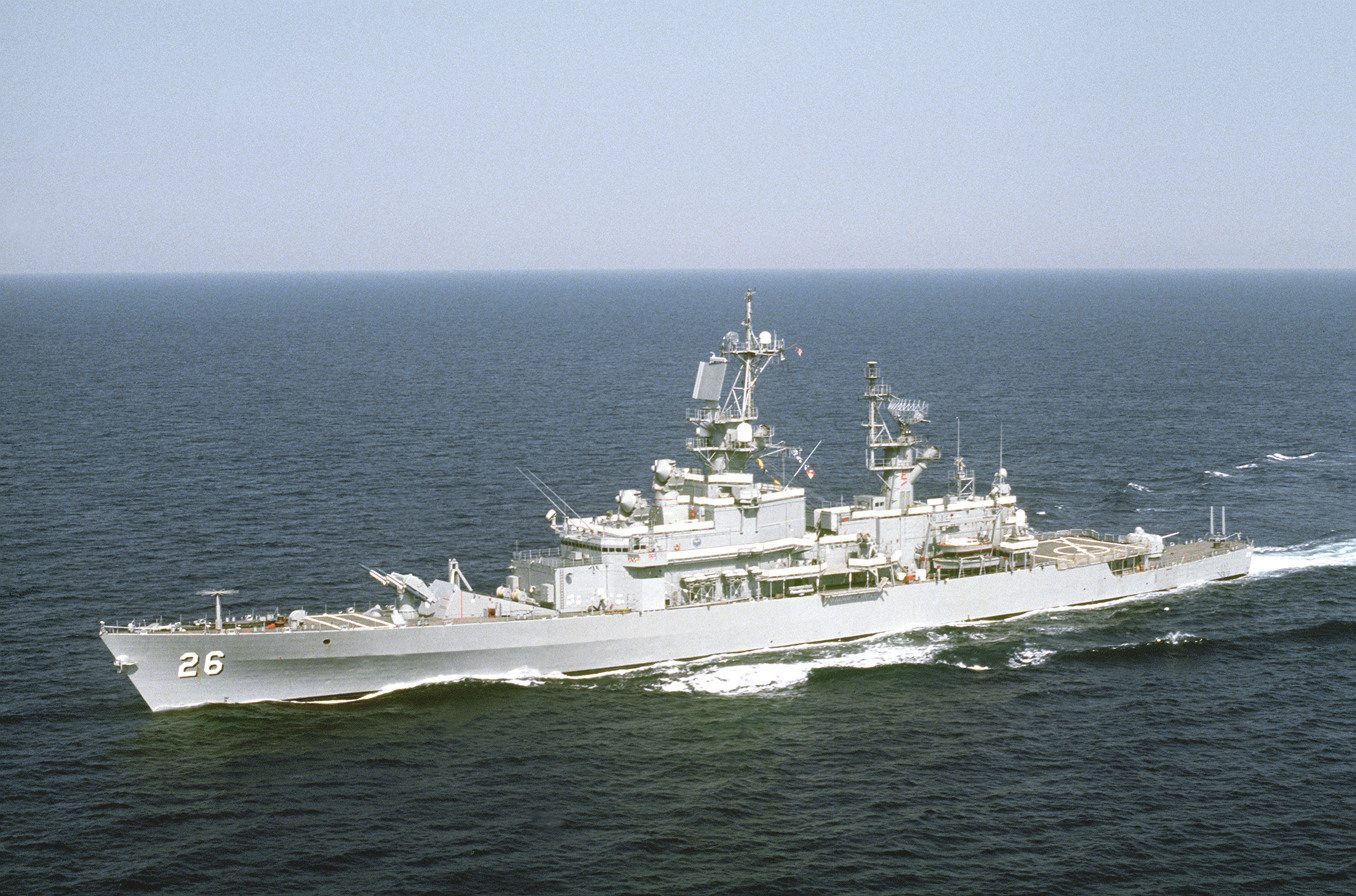
- USS Belknap (CG-26)

History

United States
- Name: Belknap
- Namesake: George E. Belknap (1832–1903); Reginald R. Belknap (1871–1959)
- Ordered: 16 May 1961
- Builder: Bath Iron Works
- Laid down: 5 February 1962
- Launched: 20 July 1963
- Sponsored by: Mrs. Leonard B. Cresswell, the grand-daughter and daughter of the RADMs Belknap
- Acquired: 4 November 1964
- Commissioned: 7 November 1964
- Decommissioned: 20 December 1975
- Recommissioned: 10 May 1980
- Decommissioned: 15 February 1995
- Reclassified: CG-26 on 30 June 1975
- Stricken: 15 December 1995
- Fate: Sunk as target on 24 SEP 1998 036° 31' 00.3" North 071° 58' 00.5" West 2050 fathoms
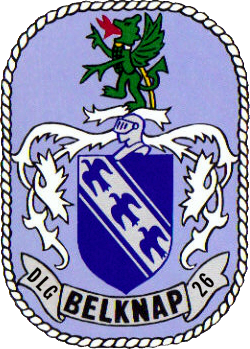
- Badge

General characteristics
- Class & type: Belknap-class cruiser
- Displacement: 8957 tons
- Length: 547 ft (167 m)
- Beam: 55 ft (17 m)
- Draft: 31 ft (9.4 m) (maximum navigational)
- Propulsion: Two sets GE or De laval steam turbines. total 85,000 shp (63 MW)
- Speed: maximum speed 34 knots (63 km/h)
- Complement: 64 officers and 546 enlisted
- Sensors & processing systems: AN/SPS-48E air-search radar; AN/SPS-49(V)5 air-search radar; AN/SPG-55B fire-control radar; AN/SPG-53F gun fire-control radar; AN/SQS-26 sonar
- Electronic warfare & decoys: AN/SLQ-32
- Armament: 1 × 5 in (127 mm)/54 caliber gun; 1 × Mark 10 Mod 7 Missile System Terrier missile / SM-2ER; 6 × 12.76-inch (324 mm) torpedo tubes (removed in 1991); Harpoon missiles; Phalanx CIWS

USS Belknap (DLG-26/CG-26), named for Rear Admirals George E. Belknap (1832–1903) and his son Reginald Rowan Belknap (1871–1959), was the lead ship of her class of guided missile cruisers in the United States Navy. She was launched in 1963 as DLG-26, a guided missile frigate under the then-current designation system, and reclassified as CG-26 on 30 June 1975.

On 22 November 1975, Belknap and the aircraft carrier John F. Kennedy collided, killing seven sailors on the cruiser and one on the aircraft carrier.

== Construction ==
Belknap, the first of a new class of guided missile frigates, was laid down by the Bath Iron Works Corporation at Bath in Maine on 5 February 1962. She was christened by Mrs. Leonard B. Cresswell, the granddaughter and daughter of the RADMs Belknap and was launched by the Bath Iron Works, Bath, Maine on 20 July 1963 and commissioned on 7 November 1964.

== Collision, fire, and reconstruction ==
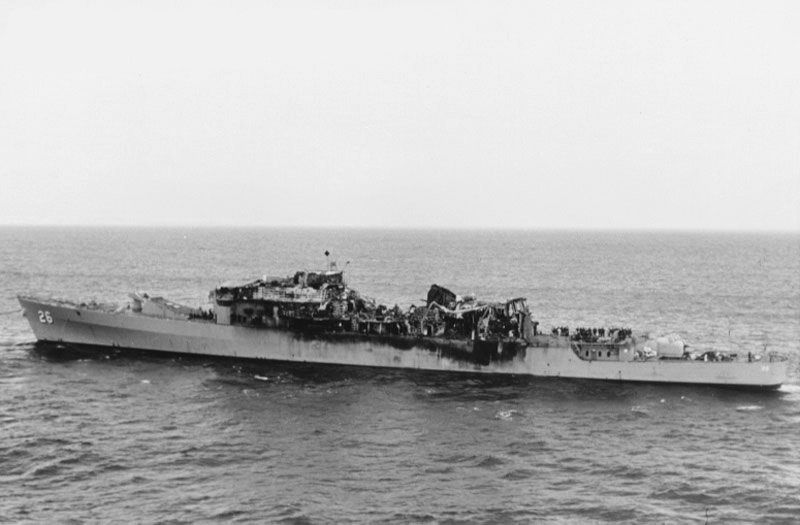
Belknap after her collision with the aircraft carrier John F. Kennedy

Belknap was severely damaged in a collision with the aircraft carrier John F. Kennedy on 22 November 1975 off the coast of Sicily. A fire broke out on Belknap following the collision, during which her aluminum superstructure collapsed after it was weakened by the heat. Seven sailors were killed on Belknap and one on John F. Kennedy.

Shortly after the fire began, boats from other vessels operating with John F. Kennedy and Belknap began to pull alongside the burning ship, often with complete disregard for their own safety. The guided missile destroyer Claude V. Ricketts and destroyer Bordelon moved in on both sides of Belknap, their men directing fire hoses into the amidships area that the stricken ship's crew could not reach. Bordelon was also badly damaged in a collision with Kennedy the following year, forcing her removal from service. Claude V. Ricketts moved in, secured alongside Belknap's port side, and evacuated the injured while fragments from exploding ammunition showered down upon her weather decks. The frigate Pharris closed in the carrier's starboard side to provide firefighting assistance. Ammunition from Belknap's three-inch ready storage locker, located amidships, cooked off, hurling fiery fragments into the air and splashing around the rescue boats. Undaunted, the rescuers pulled out the seriously wounded and delivered fire-fighting supplies to the sailors, who refused to surrender their ship to the conflagration.

The ammunition ship Mount Baker was involved later in the rescue and salvage of Belknap, escorting her to an ammunition depot and then providing electric and water services as Mount Baker's Explosive Ordnance Disposal team retrieved all of the remaining ammunition from Belknap. Mount Baker also took aboard most of Belknap's crew until they could be transferred to a way station for reassignment.

The fire and the resultant damage and deaths, which would have been less had Belknap's superstructure been made of steel, helped persuade the U.S. Navy to pursue all-steel construction in future classes of surface combatants. However, in 1987, the New York Times cited cracking in aluminum superstructures such as what occurred in the Oliver Hazard Perry-class frigates, rather than fire, as the reason the Navy returned to steel on some ships. The first USN combatant ships to revert to all steel superstructure were the Arleigh Burke class, which were commissioned beginning in the 1990s. Belknap was reconstructed by the Philadelphia Navy Yard from 30 January 1976 to 10 May 1980. Since the hull was still in good condition the Navy decided to use this as a test platform for the Aegis class cruiser electronics and updated weapons systems. Until the Aegis class cruisers came along, Belknap was one of the most powerful warships in the world and saw service in Beirut as part of the multinational peacekeeping force, becoming the first American ship to fire on an enemy since the Vietnam War. It was the ship's Naval Tactical Data Systems' (NTDS) reliability during this time in Beirut that was named as the defining reason that the Belknap was chosen as the Sixth Fleet flagship.

== Later service and Malta ==
Belknap was converted to a flagship by Norfolk Naval Shipyard from May 1985 to February 1986. This conversion work entailed building out the superstructure forward to just aft of the missile launcher and three decks up to add flag spaces (accommodation and office), and additional communications gear. In addition, the helicopter hangar aft was turned into accommodation spaces for flag staff and a small detachment of Marines. After this conversion she sailed to Italy [Gaeta naval base] and became Sixth Fleet flagship, relieving Coronado. On 27 May 1986, she participated in a naval parade with ships from 10 countries at Barcelona.

Belknap played a role in the Malta Summit between U.S. President George H. W. Bush and Soviet Leader Mikhail Gorbachev on 2 December and 3 December 1989. President Bush, along with his advisers, James Baker, John Sununu and Brent Scowcroft, had their sleeping quarters aboard Belknap, whereas the Soviet delegation used the missile cruiser Slava. The ships were anchored in a roadstead off the coast of Marsaxlokk. Stormy weather and choppy seas resulted in some meetings being canceled or rescheduled, and gave rise to the moniker the "Seasick Summit" among international media. In the end, the meetings took place aboard Maksim Gorkiy, a Soviet cruise ship anchored in the harbor at La Valletta. Engineers from the Navy Ship Systems Engineering Station devised a mooring arrangement for this event, and, despite the worst-case 100-year storm event, Belknap held her ground using emergency operating procedures as outlined by the engineers.

== Decommissioning ==
Belknap was decommissioned and stricken from the Naval Vessel Register on 15 February 1995 and sunk as a target on 24 September 1998.

== Bibliography ==
- Bellars, Robert A. (2007). "Question 41/88?: U.S. Naval Relics". Warship International. XLIV (2): 157–158. ISSN 0043-0374.
