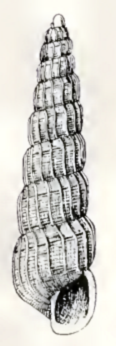
- Drawing of a shell of Turbonilla callipeplum

Scientific classification
- Kingdom: Animalia
- Phylum: Mollusca
- Class: Gastropoda
- Family: Pyramidellidae
- Genus: Turbonilla
- Species: T. callipeplum

Binomial name
- Turbonilla callipeplum Dall & Bartsch, 1909

Synonyms
- Turbonilla (Pyrgiscus) callipeplum Dall & Bartsch, 1909

= Turbonilla callipeplum =

Species of gastropod

Turbonilla callipeplum is a species of sea snail, a marine gastropod mollusk in the family Pyramidellidae, the pyrams and their allies.

== Description ==
The rather stout, milk-white shell has an elongate-conic shape. Its length measures 5.1 mm. The two whorls of the protoconch form a planorboid spire, whose axis is at right angles to the succeeding turns, in the first of which it is about one-fourth immersed. The nine whorls of the teleoconch are flattened in the middle, with a strongly sloping shoulder which extends over the posterior fourth between the sutures. They form a decided angle at its anterior termination. They are slightly contracted at the suture. They are marked by slender, sinuous, slightly retractive, sublamellar, axial ribs, of which 14 occur upon the first two whorls, 16 upon the third and fourth, 18 upon the fifth, and 20 upon the remaining turns. The intercostal spaces vary somewhat in width. They are about four times as wide as the ribs, marked by a double series of narrow pits, one of which is at the periphery and the other at the anterior termination of the posterior third of the whorls. In addition to these pits there are finely incised lines of varying strength, 18 of which occur between the two pits and 9 between the posterior pit and the summit. The sutures are well impressed. The periphery of the body whorl is slightly angulated. The base of the shell is marked by the feeble continuations of the axial ribs, which extend a little beyond the periphery, and 17 almost equal and almost equally spaced, slender, incised spiral lines. The aperture cannot be seen on the type specimen because the outer lip is fractured. The columella is reflected.

== Distribution ==
The species occurs in the Pacific Ocean off Panama Bay, Panama.
