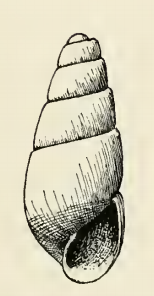
- Apertural view of a shell of Odostomia granadensis

Scientific classification
- Kingdom: Animalia
- Phylum: Mollusca
- Class: Gastropoda
- Family: Pyramidellidae
- Genus: Odostomia
- Species: O. granadensis

Binomial name
- Odostomia granadensis Dall & Bartsch, 1909

Synonyms
- Evalea granadensis Dall & Bartsch, 1909

= Odostomia granadensis =

Species of gastropod

Odostomia granadensis is a species of sea snail, a marine gastropod mollusc in the family Pyramidellidae, the pyrams and their allies.

== Description ==
The very slender, ovate-conic shell measures 2.6 mm. It is white with a narrow, faint yellow band a little posterior to the middle between the sutures. The whorls of the protoconch are very deeply obliquely immersed in the first of the succeeding turns, above which only the tilted edge of the last volution projects. The five whorls of the teleoconch are flattened, slightly contracted at the sutures, and feebly shouldered at the summits. The periphery and the base of the body whorl are well rounded, the latter somewhat attenuated. The entire surface of the spire and the base is marked by many fine, closely spaced, wavy spiral striations, which are considerably stronger on the base than between the sutures. The aperture is ovate. The posterior angle is acute. The outer lip is thin. The columella is short, slender, curved and feebly revolute, and provided with a fold at its insertion.

== Distribution ==
This species occurs in the Panama Bay.
