= Reginald R. Belknap =

United States Navy admiral (1871–1959)

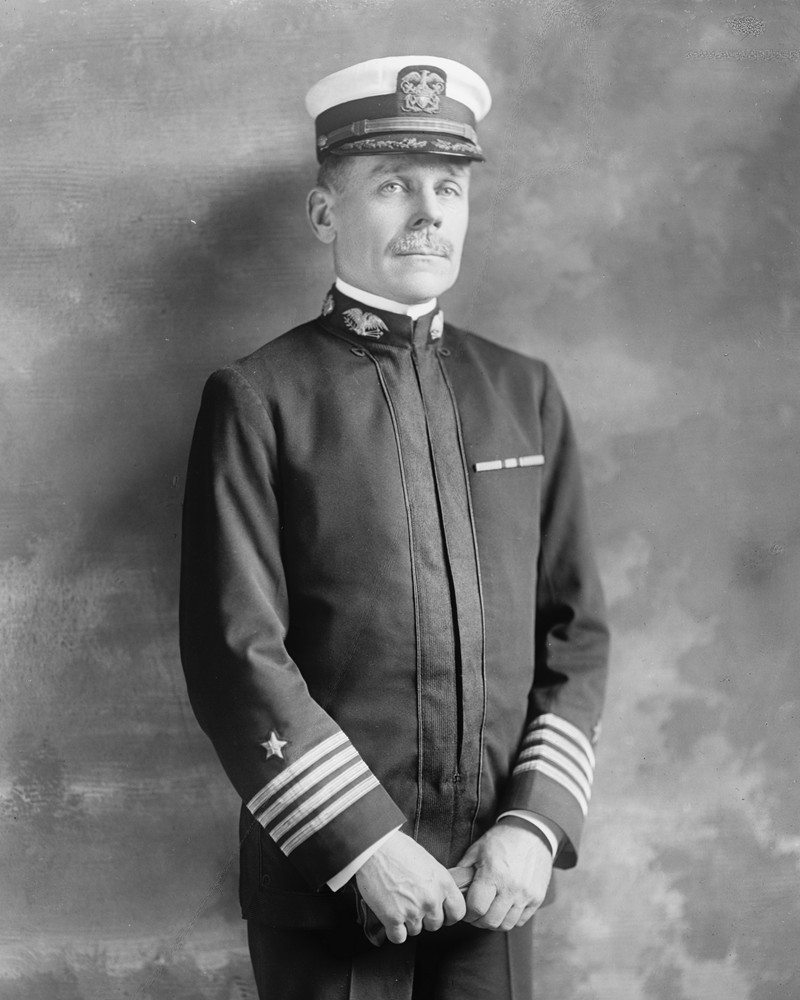
- Belknap photographed as a captain
- Born: 26 June 1871; Malden, Massachusetts, US
- Died: 30 March 1959 (aged 87); West Haven, Connecticut, US
- Burial place: Arlington National Cemetery, Arlington, Virginia
- Relatives: Rear Admiral George E. Belknap (father) (1832–1903)
- Military career
- Allegiance: United States of America
- Branch: United States Navy
- Service years: 1891–1927
- Rank: Rear Admiral
- Commands: USS San Francisco (C-5); Mine and Minesweeping Division, U.S. Atlantic Fleet; Mine Squadron One; Acting President of the Naval War College; Destroyer Submarine Base Squantum; USS Colorado (BB-45); Receiving ship, San Francisco, California; Naval Training Station Norfolk
- Conflicts: Spanish–American War; Boxer Rebellion; Taku Forts; Philippine–American War; Banana Wars; Santiago de Cuba (1917); World War I; Atlantic U-boat Campaign; North Sea Mine Barrage
- Awards: Distinguished Service Medal; Spanish Campaign Medal; World War I Victory Medal; Marine Corps Expeditionary Medal; Order of Leopold (Officer), (Belgium); Legion of Honor (Officer), (France); American Red Cross; Gold Medal
- Other work: Episcopal Church

Rear Admiral Reginald Rowan Belknap (26 June 1871 – 30 March 1959) was an officer in the United States Navy. He served in the Spanish–American War, Boxer Rebellion, Philippine–American War, and World War I. He gained distinction in 1909 for his relief work in Italy after the 1908 Messina earthquake and tsunami and for his work in command of the first offensive mining campaign in U.S. Navy history, the laying of the North Sea Mine Barrage in 1918. He was also a published author, an inventor, a member of many professional and social organizations, and an active member of the Episcopal Church, and he played a role in the selection of Amelia Earhart as the first female pilot to make a solo flight across the Atlantic Ocean.

== Early life ==
Belknap was born in Malden, Massachusetts, on 26 June 1871, the son of U.S. Navy Commander (later Rear Admiral) George E. Belknap and the former Frances Georgiana Prescott.

== Naval career ==
=== Early career ===
Belknap was appointed to the United States Naval Academy in Annapolis, Maryland, from the 1st Congressional District of Arkansas by United States Secretary of the Navy William C. Whitney. He entered the academy as a naval cadet on 5 September 1887 and graduated with distinction on 5 June 1891. His first assignment was to the protected cruiser USS Chicago, the flagship of Rear Admiral John Grimes Walker, in both the North Atlantic Squadron and the South Atlantic Squadron between 10 June 1891 and 30 April 1893. He was promoted to ensign on 1 July 1893.

From 31 July 1893 to 4 December 1894, Belknap served aboard the flagship of the Asiatic Squadron, the protected cruiser USS Baltimore. After spending the winter of 1894–1895 at Tientsin, China, Belknap was attached to the Asiatic Squadron gunboat USS Monocacy and, with the commander of the United States Marine Corps detachment from Baltimore, Captain George F. Elliott, was assigned to the American Legation at Peking, China, from 6 December 1894 to 17 May 1895. From 22 May 1895 to 27 July 1896 he was a watch officer aboard the gunboat USS Yorktown, after which he commanded Yorktown's Marine detachment at the American Legation at Seoul, Korea, from 12 May to 17 July 1896.

Returning to the United States, Belknap was on the staff of the Naval War College at Newport, Rhode Island, from 1 October 1896 to 5 October 1897, the day the new gunboat USS Newport was commissioned. He reported for duty aboard Newport that day. Newport then undertook hydrographic studies of Greytown Harbor and Roads in Nicaragua in support of the work of the Nicaragua Canal Commission.

=== Spanish–American War ===
On 2 April 1898, Newport joined the North Atlantic Squadron in anticipation of war breaking out with Spain. When the Spanish–American War began on 25 April 1898, Newport was assigned to blockade duty at Mariel on the north coast of Cuba with Belknap aboard.

On 14 May 1898, Belknap became the secretary on the personal staff of Commodore George C. Remey, commander of the naval base at Key West, Florida. He remained on this duty through the end of the war in August 1898, successively aboard the monitor USS Miantonomoh, the auxiliary cruiser USS Suwanee, the gunboat USS Fern, and the sloop-of-war USS Lancaster as each ship served as Remey's flagship. The naval base moved to Hampton Roads, Virginia, on 18 August 1898 and was disbanded on 25 August 1898.

=== 1898–1900 ===
Belknap next served on the gunboat USS Helena from 19 to 29 September 1898 and on the battleship USS Indiana from 1 October 1898 to 13 January 1899. From 16 January to 31 October 1899, he was aboard the auxiliary cruiser USS Badger, cruising along the United States West Coast and to the Falkland Islands and Samoa, where she carried the Joint High Commission of the United States, Great Britain, and Germany. He was promoted to lieutenant, junior grade, on 3 March 1899 while aboard Badger. His next tour was aboard the gunboat USS Ranger from 1 November 1899 to 10 March 1900, during which she made a surveying cruise.

=== Asiatic Squadron ===
From 1 April 1900 until 1901, Belknap had a second tour on the staff of George C. Remey—by now a rear admiral and the commander of the Asiatic Squadron—serving as aide with the duties of secretary aboard Remey's flagship, the armored cruiser USS Brooklyn. During this tour, he took part in the Philippine–American War, served off the Taku Forts during operations in China in the summer of 1900 during the Boxer Rebellion, was promoted to lieutenant on 2 July 1900, and visited New Zealand and Australia on the occasion of the opening of Australia's First Commonwealth Parliament by The Prince George and Princess Victoria Mary of Teck, the Duke and Duchess of Cornwall and York, in May 1901.

=== 1902–1917 ===
From 1902 to 1904, Belknap had duty in the Navy's Bureau of Navigation. He served aboard the battleship USS Maine from 1904 to 1905, and from 1905 to 1906 he was navigator and later executive officer of the battleship USS Kearsarge. He was promoted to lieutenant commander on 8 July 1905. From 1907 to 1910, he was the United States naval attaché to Germany at Berlin, and from 1908 to 1909 also was naval attaché to Italy at Rome and naval attaché to Austria-Hungary at Vienna. Following a devastating earthquake and tsunami at Messina, Italy, on 28 December 1908, he became the director of the American Red Cross relief ship effort that responded to the disaster and oversaw the construction of 16,000 homes at nine different locations in the vicinity of Messina and Reggio di Calabria. In 1910, he served as special ambassador and naval aide to former President Theodore Roosevelt at the funeral of King Edward VII in the United Kingdom.

From 1910 to 1911, Belknap was executive officer of the battleship USS North Dakota, and he was promoted to commander in 1911. He was assistant to the chief of the Navy's Bureau of Navigation from 1912 to 1913 and attended the Naval War College as a student from 1913 to 1914.

In 1914, Belknap was aboard the armored cruiser USS Tennessee as a naval aide and then was assistant to the naval attaché at Berlin, serving as an observer of the first three months of World War I there from August to October 1914 before becoming commanding officer of the minelayer USS San Francisco on 12 December 1914. Relinquishing command of San Francisco on 16 December 1915, he became commander of the United States Atlantic Fleet's Mining and Minesweeping Division.

=== Insurrection at Santiago de Cuba ===
In early 1917, Belknap became involved in an insurrection in Oriente Province in Cuba, where supporters of the Liberal Party who opposed the 1916 reelection of the Conservative Party's Mario García Menocal as President of Cuba took control. Belknap's squadron was in the harbor at Santiago de Cuba and, as senior American naval officer there, Belknap attempted to negotiate a local settlement between the two sides to avoid the loss of life and damage to property in the city if open fighting were to break out there. After meetings aboard USS San Francisco, he succeeded in brokering an agreement on 1 March 1917 which the United States Government ratified the next day, but Menocal's central government rejected the agreement and its troops advanced on Santiago de Cuba. On 7 March, Belknap decreed that Menocal's forces would not be allowed to enter the city and, at the request of Liberal officials, sent 400 officers and men from his squadron ashore the next day to patrol the city. By mid-March, however, the compromise Belknap had brokered had collapsed, and the commander-in-chief of the Atlantic Fleet, Admiral Henry Thomas Mayo, reprimanded him for exceeding his authority in demanding that Menocal's forces not enter Santiago de Cuba. On 25 March, the Americans patrolling the city were withdrawn to their ships and Menocal's troops took control of Santiago de Cuba, with Belknap lamenting that "our Government has made up its mind to let the Cuban Government put the insurrection down irregardless [sic] of losses as a good precedent. It will discourage other revolutions to have this one fail."

=== World War I ===
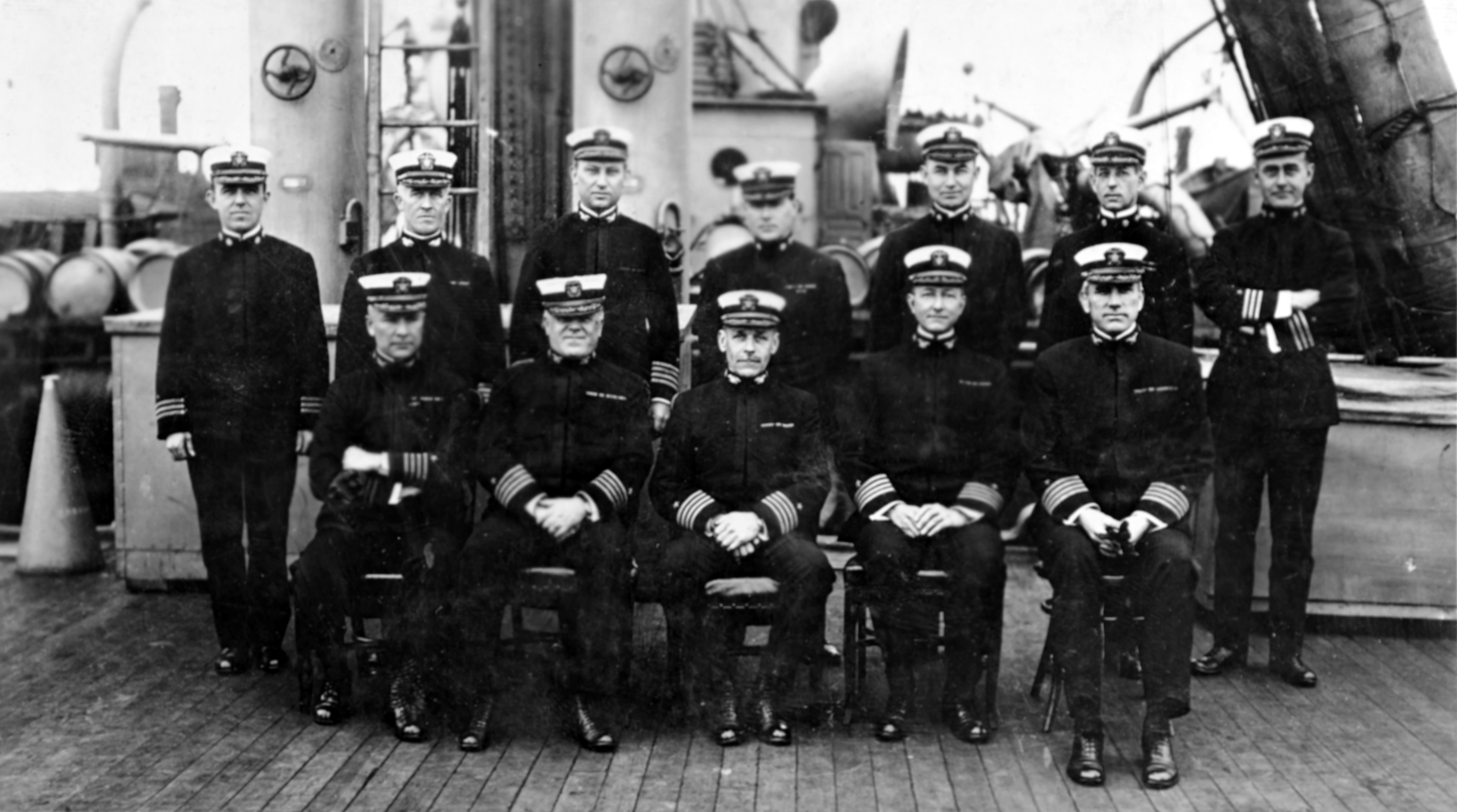
The officers of Mine Squadron One in September 1918. Captain Reginald Belknap, the squadron's commander, is seated at center.

Belknap was still in command of the Mining and Minesweeping Division when the United States entered World War I in April 1917. He transferred to duty in the Plans Section of the Office of the Chief of Naval Operations that year. In 1918, promoted to captain, he invented and patented a collapsible antisubmarine net and in the spring became commander of Mine Squadron One, which was tasked with laying the North Sea Mine Barrage, a primarily American effort to end use of the North Sea by German submarines as a transit route between Germany and the Atlantic Ocean by laying a dense minefield between the Orkney Islands and Norway. After taking command, Belknap organized and trained the squadron, which was made up of ten large ships capable of carrying a combined total of 6,000 naval mines.

Under Belknap's command, Mine Squadron One deployed to its bases in Scotland at Inverness and Invergordon in May 1918. He personally commanded the activities of the squadron during its first foray into the North Sea on 2 June 1918, beginning the first offensive mining campaign in the history of the U.S. Navy and one of the largest U.S. Navy contributions to the Allied naval effort during the war. He commanded the squadron on nine more excursions, the last of them in the last week of October 1918, by which time it had laid 56,611 Mark 6 "antenna" mines in 13 groups, with each group consisting of rows of mines 134 nautical miles (248 kilometres) across set at three preset depths of between 10 and 260 feet (3.0 and 79.2 meters), covering an area of 6,000 square miles. The British Royal Navy also contributed, laying 16,652 additional mines along the flanks of the American minefield. The war ended on 11 November 1918 before Mine Squadron One could finish a complete antisubmarine barrier, but the Barrage nonetheless is credited with sinking at least three German submarines and perhaps three more, as well as damaging three or four others. It also had a large psychological effect on German submarine crews, one of which mutinied when ordered to pass through the Barrage.

In 1925, Admiral Henry Thomas Mayo, who had been the commander-in-chief of the Atlantic Fleet in 1918, said: "The Navy and our country owe to Captain Belknap a debt which can hardly be over-estimated; for it was the knowledge and experience acquired and the doctrine and methods established in the Mine Force under command of Commander [sic] Belknap that enabled the Navy to, first, fit out improvised by very efficient minelaying vessels and, second, to operate them under war conditions in a manner which brought commendation from all."

=== Later career ===
From 17 March to 11 April 1919, Belknap was the third of three officers to serve as Acting President of the Naval War College while the college's academic activities were shut down for World War I and its immediate aftermath. In 1919 and 1920 he was commanding officer of Destroyer Submarine Base Squantum at Squantum, Massachusetts. He then returned to the Naval War College as the chairman of its Strategy Department from 1921 to 1923. Upon the commissioning of the new battleship USS Colorado (BB-45) on 30 August 1923, he became her first commanding officer.

Relinquishing command of Colorado in 1925, Belknap became commanding officer of the receiving ship at San Francisco, California. In 1926 he moved on to his final tour, in which he was commanding officer of Naval Training Station Norfolk in Norfolk, Virginia.

Belknap was transferred to the retired list on 26 June 1926, but remained on active duty, and on 3 May 1927 was promoted to rear admiral by an act of the United States Congress for his World War I service. He relinquished command of the training station on 30 June 1927 and entered retirement.

== Honors and awards ==
In 1919, Belknap received the Distinguished Service Medal for his achievements in the North Sea Mine Barrage effort the previous year. He also received the Spanish Campaign Medal, the World War I Victory Medal, and the Marine Corps Expeditionary Medal during his career. In 1920, Belgium made him an Officer of the Order of Leopold and France made him an Officer of the Legion of Honor. He received various medals for his 1909 relief work at Messina and Reggio di Calabria, including the American Red Cross Gold Medal.

== Retirement ==
Belknap had a long and active retirement and was a member of many military orders and societies.

He was elected a Hereditary Companion of the New York Commandery of the Military Order of the Loyal Legion of the United States on 17 November 1937 (insignia number 19,131) and served as the Order's national commander-in-chief from 15 October 1947 to 9 October 1951. He was also a member of the Naval Order of the United States and served as its commander general from 1931 to 1937. In 1897 he became an Hereditary Companion of the Military Order of Foreign Wars and became a Veteran Companion after his service in the Spanish–American War.

He was commander of the New York Chapter of the Military Order of the World War from 1931 to 1935 and served as the Order's national vice commander-in-chief from 1933 to 1936 and national commander-in-chief from 1936 to 1937. He served as president of the Naval Academy Graduates Association of New York in 1943.

Belknap was also a member of the Order of the Founders and Patriots of America, the Colonial Order of the Acorn, the New York Yacht Club, the New York Society of Naval and Military Officers of the World War, the Union Club of the City of New York, the Century Association, and the Army and Navy Club of Washington, D.C. He was vice president of the Aerospace Club of New England.

From 1927 to 1928, Belknap was executive chairman of the Massachusetts Bay Tercentenary, celebrated in 1930. He also served as chairman of the Army Day Committee in New York City from 1934 to 1946.

Active in the Episcopal Church, Belknap was a vestryman and the warden of Trinity Church in New York City and a member of the board of managers of the Seamen's Church Institute of New York and New Jersey. He was treasurer, bursar, and registrar of the General Theological Seminary in New York City from 1929 to 1950, manager of the General Convention of the Episcopal Church in the United States of America in 1934 and a delegate to the convention from 1937 to 1949, president of the American Church Union in 1937, chairman of the executive committee and treasurer of Bundles for America, chairman of the executive committee of the Layman's National Committee from 1945 to 1950, a trustee of the Cathedral of St. John the Divine from 1941 to 1953, and a trustee of Leake and Watts Children's Home. He was also a member of the Church Club of New York.

Belknap also was a very active member of the National Aeronautic Association in Boston. When Amy Phipps Guest offered to sponsor the first solo flight by a woman across the Atlantic Ocean, publisher George P. Putnam joined the search for a female aviator to undertake the journey. When Putnam asked Boston public relations specialist Harold Railey if he had any contacts in Boston who could suggest a candidate, Railey contacted his friend Belknap, who suggested "a young social worker who flies," Amelia Earhart. Earhart went on to achieve fame by becoming the first woman to fly solo across the Atlantic in 1928.

== Published works ==
In 1910, G. P. Putnam's Sons in New York City published Belknap's account of his 1909 relief work in Italy, American House Building in Messina and Reggio. In 1920, the United States Naval Institute in Annapolis, Maryland, published his book The Yankee Mining Squadron about the North Sea Mine Barrage operations he commanded during World War I. Belknap also wrote Introduction to the Life and Letters of Rear Admiral George Collier Remey, U.S.N., 1841–1928, published in Washington, D.C., in 1940.

== Personal life ==
Belknap married the former Julia Pomeroy Averill (1875–1971) on 3 or 31 March 1900 (sources differ). They had seven children: Averill Belknap (1903–1994), Frances Georgiana Belknap (1904–1996), Emilia Field Belknap (1906–1982), Rexane Belknap (1912–1922), Mary Rowan Belknap (1917–2003), Barberie Ann Belknap (1922–1977), and Marshall S. Edgar Belknap (1931–1931).

Averill Belknap married Andrew Robert Mack (1896–1977), a U.S. Navy officer who eventually attained the rank of rear admiral. Their son Robert Belknap Mack also became a U.S. Navy officer and reached the rank of lieutenant commander before he was lost at sea on 24 September 1957.

Emilia Belknap married Leonard Baker Cresswell (1901–1966), a United States Marine Corps officer who eventually attained the rank of major general.

== Death ==
Reginald Belknap died in West Haven, Connecticut, on 30 March 1959. He is buried with his wife and near his father and mother at Arlington National Cemetery, Arlington, Virginia. The rear of Reginald and Julia Belknap's headstone is etched in memory of their grandson, Lieutenant Commander Robert Belknap Mack.

== Namesake ==
The U.S. Navy guided-missile frigate (later guided-missile cruiser) USS Belknap (DLG-26) (later CG-26), was co-named for Reginald Belknap and his father, Rear Admiral George E. Belknap. Reginald Belknap's daughter Mary Rowan Belknap Howard visited the ship at Gaeta, Italy, in 1994 while Belknap was flagship of the United States Sixth Fleet.

== Gallery ==
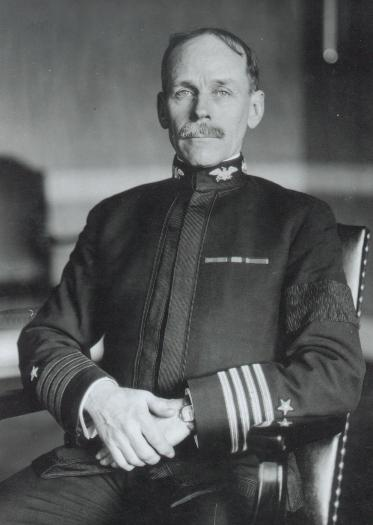
Belknap photographed as a captain

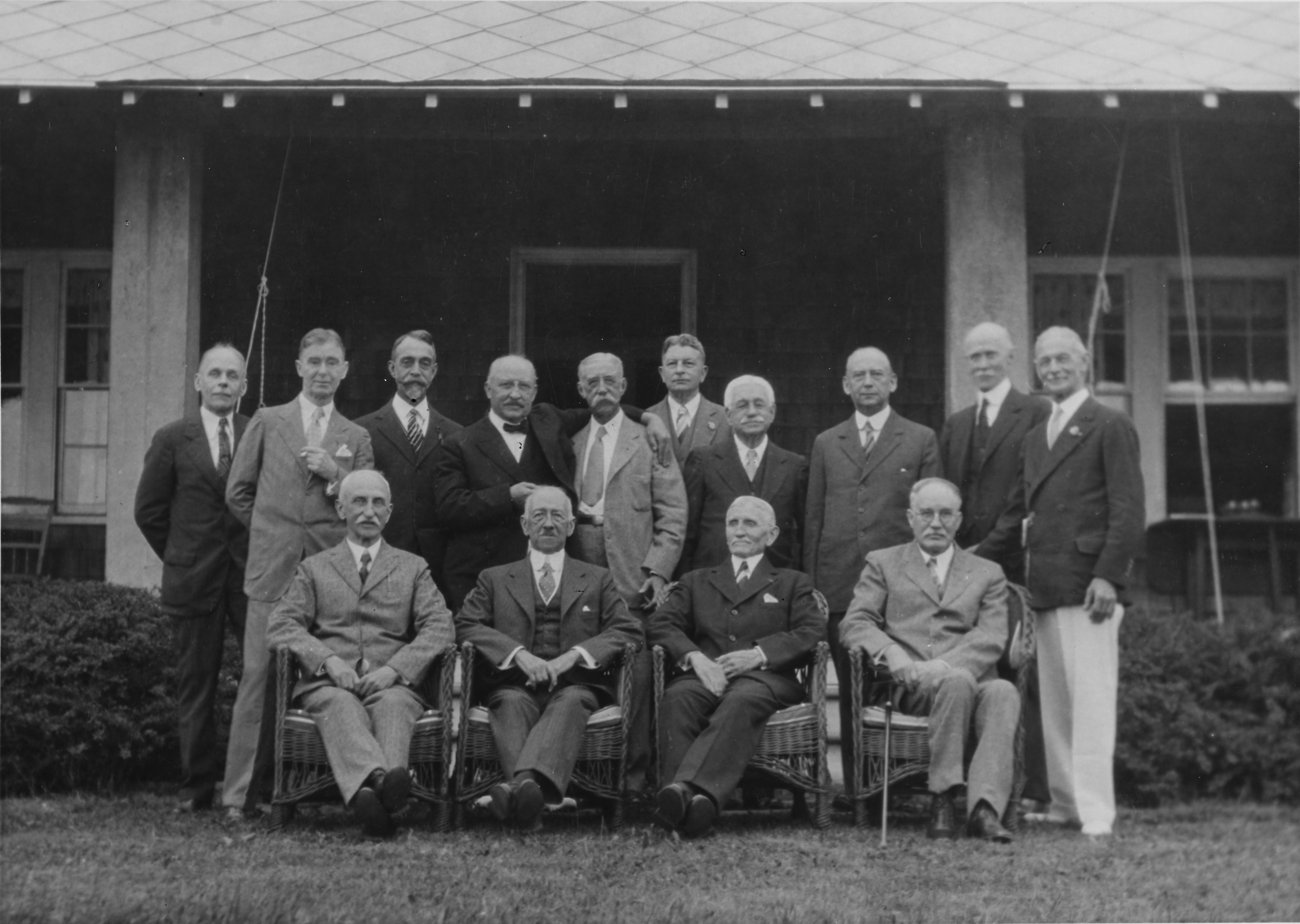
Belknap is standing farthest left in this photograph of retired U.S. Navy admirals and other retirees taken in Jamestown, Rhode Island, on 7 August 1928.
