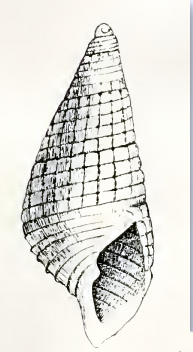
- Apertural view of the shell of Odostomia defolinia

Scientific classification
- Kingdom: Animalia
- Phylum: Mollusca
- Class: Gastropoda
- Family: Pyramidellidae
- Genus: Odostomia
- Species: O. defolinia

Binomial name
- Odostomia defolinia Dall & Bartsch, 1909

Synonyms
- Odostomia (Chrysallida) defolinia Dall & Bartsch, 1909 (basionym)

= Odostomia defolinia =

Species of gastropod

Odostomia defolinia is a species of sea snail, a marine gastropod mollusc in the family Pyramidellidae, the pyrams and their allies.

== Subspecies ==
- Odostomia defolinia contracta (de Folin, 1872)
- Odostomia defolinia difficilis Dall & Bartsch, 1909

== Description ==
The conic shell is crystalline, and shining. It measures 3.6 mm. The whorls of the protoconch number one and one-half, and are the greater part immersed in the first of the succeeding turns. The five whorls of the teleoconch are flattened. They are marked by four spiral ridges between the sutures and axial ribs, the intersections of which form low squarish tubercles of which about 11 occur upon the second and 18 upon the penultimate whorl. The sutures are poorly impressed. The periphery of the body whorl is marked by a spiral cord. The base of the shell is attenuated, marked by six equally spaced spiral cords and slender axial threads in the grooves between the cords. The aperture is oval. The posterior angle is acute. The outer lip is thin, showing the external sculpture within. The columella is moderately strong, slightly curved, and provided with a strong fold a little below its insertion.

== Distribution ==
The type specimen of this marine species was found off Margarita Island in the Bay of Panama.
