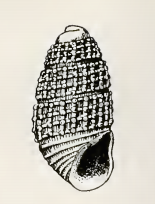
- Apertural view of the shell of Odostomia inconspicua

Scientific classification
- Kingdom: Animalia
- Phylum: Mollusca
- Class: Gastropoda
- Family: Pyramidellidae
- Genus: Odostomia
- Species: O. inconspicua

Binomial name
- Odostomia inconspicua (C.B. Adams, 1852)

Synonyms
- Odostomia (Chrysallida) inconspicua C.B. Adams, 1852

= Odostomia inconspicua =

Species of gastropod

Odostomia inconspicua is a species of sea snail, a marine gastropod mollusc in the family Pyramidellidae, the pyrams and their allies.

== Description ==
The ovoid shell is milk-white. It measures 1.5 mm. The nuclear whorls are deeply, obliquely immersed in the first of the succeeding turns, above which only the tilted edge of the last volution projects, which is smooth.

The five post-nuclear whorls are very slightly rounded. They are ornamented by strong axial ribs, of which 18 occur upon the second and third and 20 upon the penultimate turn. In addition to the axial ribs, the whorls are marked by four equal and equally spaced slender spiral cords, which are a little less strong than the ribs, and render the junction with these nodulous. The sutures are channeled.

The periphery and base of the body whorl are well rounded, the latter marked by six equal spiral ords, which are about as wide as the spaces that separate them. The impressed grooves are crossed by numerous slender axial threads. The aperture is ovate. The posterior angle is obtuse.

The outer lip is thin and pinched inwards in the middle. The columella is slender, moderately curved, slightly reflected, partly reinforced by the base. The parietal wall is covered with a strong callus, which renders the peritreme complete.

== Distribution ==
This species occurs in the Pacific Ocean off Panama Bay.
