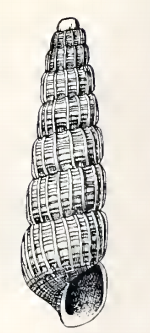
- Drawing of a shell of Turbonilla genilda

Scientific classification
- Kingdom: Animalia
- Phylum: Mollusca
- Class: Gastropoda
- Family: Pyramidellidae
- Genus: Turbonilla
- Species: T. genilda

Binomial name
- Turbonilla genilda Dall & Bartsch, 1909

Synonyms
- Turbonilla (Dunkeria) genilda Dall & Bartsch, 1909

= Turbonilla genilda =

Species of gastropod

Turbonilla genilda is a species of sea snail, a marine gastropod mollusk in the family Pyramidellidae, the pyrams and their allies.

== Description ==
The shell has an elongate-conic shape. It is white on the shoulder, the rest light brown. Its length measures 5.3 mm. (The whorls of the protoconch are decollated.) The ten whorls of the teleoconch are flattened in the middle, well contracted at the sutures. They have a strong sloping shoulder which extends over the posterior third between the sutures, rendering them angulated at its anterior termination. The whorls are marked by strongly elevated, narrow, axial ribs, which are vertical on the early whorls and decidedly retractive on the later ones. The intercostal spaces are about two and one-half times as wide as the ribs. They are marked by a very broad, deep, peripheral pit and two less wide on the anterior third between the sutures; the median third is marked by three moderately broad pits, separated by slender lirations, the shoulder has a narrow line immediately below the summit and three well incised lines anterior to this, the anterior of which is less strongly developed than the other two. The spaces between the second and third, and third and fourth, posterior to the peripheral one, are wider than the rest. All the raised areas between the pits are crossed by very fine spiral striations. The periphery of the body whorl is slightly angulated. The base of the shell is short, and well rounded. It is marked by the feeble continuations of the axial ribs and ten spiral striations, which decrease in size and spacing from the periphery to the umbilicus. The aperture is rhomboidal. The posterior angle is obtuse. The outer lip is thin. The columella is slender, very oblique, and slightly revolute.

== Distribution ==
The type specimen was found in the Pacific Ocean off Panama Bay, Panama.
