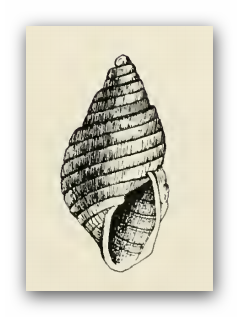
- Apertural view of the shell of Odostomia callipyrga

Scientific classification
- Kingdom: Animalia
- Phylum: Mollusca
- Class: Gastropoda
- Family: Pyramidellidae
- Genus: Odostomia
- Species: O. callipyrga

Binomial name
- Odostomia callipyrga Dall & Bartsch, 1904

Synonyms
- Odostomia (Odetta) callipyrga Dall and Bartsch, 1904 (basionym); Odetta elegans de Follin, 1872 not Odostomia (Evalea) elegans A. Adams, 1860, not Harvella [Odostomia] elegans H. and A. Adams, 1863; not Odostomia elegans Monterosato, 1869

= Odostomia callipyrga =

Species of gastropod

Odostomia callipyrga is a species of sea snail, a marine gastropod mollusc in the family Pyramidellidae, the pyrams and their allies.

== Description ==
The white, oblong-ovate shell is somewhat ventricose. Its length measures 2.2 mm. The whorls of the protoconch are nearly half immersed in the first of the succeeding turns. The four whorls of the teleoconch are somewhat inflated, moderately contracted at the periphery and moderately shouldered at the summit. They are marked by strong spiral cords of which 2 appear upon the first, 3 upon the second, and 4 upon the penultimate turn between the sutures. These cords are separated by well impressed, narrow, spiral grooves which are crossed by slender axial threads. The periphery and the base of the body whorl are well rounded, marked by four spiral cords, similar to those on the spire, the space between which is ornamented like the grooves in the spire. The aperture is oval. The posterior angle is acute. The outer lip is thin, showing the external sculpture within. The columella is slender, somewhat curved and slightly reflected, provided with a fold at its insertion.

== Distribution ==
This species is found in the Bay of Panama.
