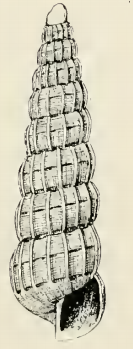
- Drawing of a shell of Turbonilla dina

Scientific classification
- Kingdom: Animalia
- Phylum: Mollusca
- Class: Gastropoda
- Family: Pyramidellidae
- Genus: Turbonilla
- Species: T. dina

Binomial name
- Turbonilla dina Dall & Bartsch, 1909

Synonyms
- Turbonilla (Pyrgiscus) dina Dall & Bartsch, 1909

= Turbonilla dina =

Species of gastropod

Turbonilla dina is a species of sea snail, a marine gastropod mollusk in the family Pyramidellidae, the pyrams and their allies.

== Description ==
The milk-white shell has an elongate-conic shape. Its length measures 5.2 mm. The 2½ whorls of the protoconch form a depressed, helicoid spire, the axis of which is at right angles to that of the succeeding turns, in the first of which it is about one-fifth immersed. The nine whorls of the teleoconch are slightly rounded on the anterior two-thirds between the sutures, the posterior third forming a strong sloping shoulder. They are marked by narrow, lamellar ribs, of which 18 occur upon the first, 16 upon the second to seventh, and 18 upon the eighth and penultimate turn. The intercostal spaces are about four times as wide as the ribs. They are marked by a double series of pits, one of which is at the periphery and the other at the angle of the shoulder. The space between the two pits is crossed by nine equal and equally spaced spiral striations. The space between the summit and the submedian pit is marked by twelve incised spiral lines of which those near the summit are finer and closer spaced than the rest. The sutures are strongly impressed. The periphery of the body whorl is slightly angulated. The base of the shell is short, and well rounded. It is marked by about twenty equal and almost equally spaced spiral striations. The aperture is rhomboidal. The posterior angle is acute. The outer lip is thin, showing the external sculpture within. The columella is slender, almost straight and somewhat revolute.

== Distribution ==
The type specimen was found in the Pacific Ocean off Panama Bay, Panama.
