= USS Belknap (DD-251) =

Clemson-class destroyer

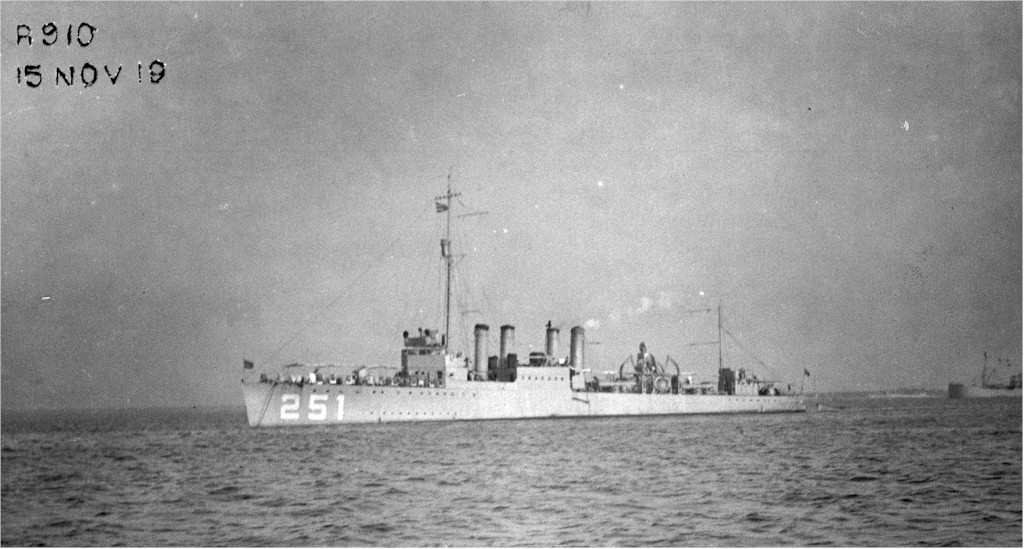

History

United States
- Namesake: George Belknap
- Builder: Bethlehem Shipbuilding Corporation, Fore River Shipyard, Quincy
- Cost: $1,233,888.43 (hull and machinery)
- Laid down: 31 July 1918
- Launched: 14 January 1919
- Commissioned: 28 April 1919
- Decommissioned: 4 August 1945
- Stricken: 13 August 1945
- Fate: Sold for scrap, 30 November 1945

General characteristics
- Class & type: Clemson-class destroyer
- Displacement: 1,215 tons
- Length: 314 ft 4 in (95.8 m)
- Beam: 31 ft 8 in (9.7 m)
- Draft: 9 ft 10 in (3.0 m)
- Propulsion: 26,500 shp (19,800 kW); Geared turbines, 2 screws
- Speed: 35 knots (65 km/h)
- Range: 4,900 nmi (9,100 km) at 15 knots (28 km/h)
- Complement: 130 officers and enlisted
- Armament: 4 × 4 in (102 mm) guns; 1 × 3 in (76 mm) gun; 12 × 21 in (533 mm) torpedo tubes

USS Belknap (DD-251/AVD-8/DD-251/APD-34) was a Clemson-class destroyer in the United States Navy during World War II. She was named for Rear Admiral George Belknap.

== History ==
Belknap was launched 14 January 1919 by Bethlehem Shipbuilding Corporation; sponsored by Miss Frances Georgiana Belknap, granddaughter of Admiral Belknap; and commissioned 28 April 1919.

Following her shakedown cruise, Belknap joined US naval forces in the eastern Mediterranean. After several months she returned to the United States and served with Division 28, Atlantic Fleet, until placed in reserve at Charleston Navy Yard in 1920. She was decommissioned 28 June 1922 at Philadelphia Navy Yard and remained there until 1940.

== World War II ==
During 1940 Belknap was converted into a seaplane tender (reclassified AVD-8, 2 August 1940) and recommissioned 22 November 1940. She was assigned to Patrol Wing 5 at Hamilton, Bermuda, and remained there until early 1941 when she returned to Newport, Rhode Island. Between May and September 1941 she made three voyages from Newport to Newfoundland and Iceland. She remained at Reykjavík, Iceland, during September 1941 May 1942 and then went to Charleston Navy Yard for an extensive overhaul From August 1942 to January 1943 she patrolled in the Caribbean and between February 194S and January 1944 she served with the escort carriers Bogue, Croatan, and Core offensive antisubmarine groups in the Atlantic. Reclassified DD-251, 14 November 1943, Belknap received the Presidential Unit Citation (US) for her service with TG 21.12 (Bogue group), 20 April-20 June 1943. Following convoy duty along the east and Gulf coasts (February–June 1944), Belknap underwent conversion into a high speed transport (reclassified APD-34, 22 June 1944).

Conversion completed, Belknap arrived in the Pacific during September 1944. During 18–22 October she served as a screen ship during the Leyte invasion and during 3–11 January 1945 as a shore bombardment and beach reconnaissance vessel at the Lingayen Gulf landings. On 11 January she trained all her guns on a Japanese kamikaze which eventually crashed into Belknap's number two stack, crippling her engines, killing 38 and wounding 49 including the UDTs on board. UDT 9 was on board when she was hit. It cost the team one officer, 7 enlisted, 3 MIA and 13 wounded. The ship remained at Lingayen for emergency repairs until 18 January when USS Hidatsa, ATF-102 towed her to Manus, Admiralty Islands. Following temporary repairs at Manus, Belknap proceeded to Philadelphia Navy Yard via the west coast, arriving 18 June. Decommissioned 4 August 1945, Belknap was sold 30 November 1945 for scrapping. In addition to her Presidential Unit Citation, Belknap received three battle stars for her World War II service.
