= USS Lancaster Eagle =

Figurehead by John Haley Bellamy

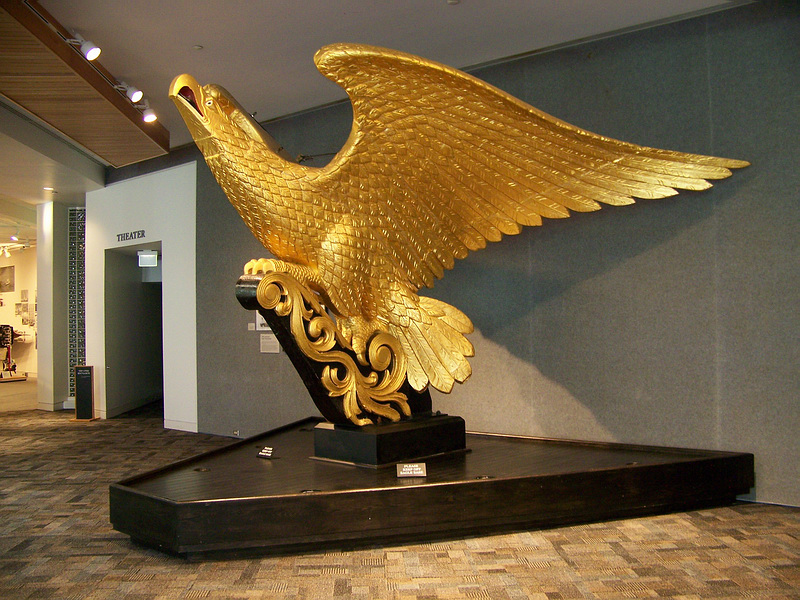
- USS Lancaster Eagle on display
- Artist: John Haley Bellamy
- Year: 1880-1881
- Dimensions: 19'4" (wingspan) X 10' (height)
- Location: The Mariners' Museum, Newport News, Virginia

The USS Lancaster Eagle is a figurehead that was carved in 1880-1881 by John Haley Bellamy for the USS Lancaster. The eagle is currently owned by and displayed at the Mariners' Museum and Park in Newport News, Virginia.

== History ==
This eagle figurehead was carved for USS Lancaster (originally built in 1858) while the ship was at the Portsmouth Naval Shipyard located in Kittery, Maine for repairs. There had previously been no figurehead on the ship and an eagle was chosen because of its representation of the United States and the qualities it symbolizes, which are courage, liberty and immortality. Bellamy was chosen to carve the figurehead because of his skill and the fact that his work was highly prized, and for this task he received two dollars and thirty-two cents a day for payment.

Eagle figurehead on the bow of the Lancaster

The piece took over a week to install underneath the bowsprit of the ship, which was still on the slipway at the time. The eagle was dismantled and brought to the ship, where it was then bolted together and mounted underneath the bowsprit using special scaffolding under the direction of Bellamy. Once this and the repairs of the ship were complete, Lancaster sailed off on 12 September 1881, without any type of dedication or launching ceremony.

In December 1920, Admiral Samuel Robison, Commander of the Boston Navy Yard, inquired about the eagle and its condition in hopes of acquiring it for a Boston Naval Museum that was being proposed, but was never created. No action was taken until 9 December 1921, when the figurehead was ordered to be shipped to the Boston Navy Yard where it was set up in the chain park, inaccessible to the public. There the figurehead received very little care, allowing the elements to take a toll on the piece until it became a liability to the Navy. Because of the estimated cost to restore the figurehead, over $7000, the decision was made to sell it to the highest bidder, and on 4 April 1925, it was purchased for $262.89 by the Atlantic Marine Exchange of Boston. To avoid traffic issues, the eagle was shipped by way of a barge to the shop, which was located on the waterfront.

At the shop, the eagle was displayed with a sign describing its origin, but nothing about Bellamy as designer and carver. It was also given a price tag of $2500. Earle Smith, an antique dealer acting as a representative for The Mariners' Museum, came to the shop 2 January 1934 to inquire about the eagle and managed to purchase it for $2200, not including shipping. To be shipped to Newport News, where it arrived in February 1934, the wings of the eagle had to be removed and all pieces were placed on a flatbed truck. Once at the museum, the eagle was fastened to the outside of the building using guy wires until 1936, when the main gallery was completed and the eagle could be moved inside.

The USS Lancaster Eagle in the process of being gold leafed at The Mariners' Museum in 1964

At some point in the early twentieth century, the eagle had been painted brown and white to mimic the natural colors of a bald eagle, and this was how the piece looked when it arrived at The Mariners' Museum in 1934. In 1960, museum workers scraped off all of the brown and white paint, getting down to the bare wood. A base coat was then applied, after which the eagle was gold leafed to return it to its original look.

The Lancaster Eagle is the only known existing figurehead carved by Bellamy and is often considered to be his greatest masterpiece.

== The "Bellamy Eagle" ==
Bellamy was known to carve other types of objects, but because he made eagles his specialty and they became so highly prized for their quality, his style has become known as the "Bellamy Eagle." While every eagle carved by Bellamy was unique, they had certain common characteristics. One of these was the beak, which was generally broad and flattened along the top and front with the top meeting or hanging over the bottom, giving it the look of a rectangular hook. The eyes were another tell-tale sign of an eagle carved by Bellamy as the eye sockets were generally heavily incised. A third common characteristic is the deep hollow beneath the wings that gave the eagles the illusion of lift and power in association with flight, which is visible in the Lancaster Eagle.
