= Matthew Gillick =

- Born: 1852; Providence, Rhode Island, US
- Died: Unknown
- Military career
- Allegiance: United States
- Branch: United States Navy
- Rank: Boatswain's Mate
- Unit: USS Lancaster
- Awards: Medal of Honor

Matthew Gillick (born 1852, date of death unknown) was a United States Navy sailor and a recipient of the United States military's highest decoration, the Medal of Honor.

== Biography ==
Born in April 1852 in Providence, Rhode Island, Gillick joined the Navy from that state on July 16, 1881, at the age of 29 years and 3 months. By November 20, 1883, he was serving as a boatswain's mate on the USS Lancaster. On that day, while Lancaster was at Marseille, France, a boy fell into the water from a breakwater near the ship. Gillick and another sailor, Ordinary Seaman Apprentice John F. Auer, jumped overboard and rescued him. For this action, both Gillick and Auer were awarded the Medal of Honor a year later, on October 18, 1884.

Gillick's official Medal of Honor citation reads:

Serving on board the U.S.S. Lancaster at Marseille, France, 20 November 1883. Jumping overboard from the Lancaster, Gillick rescued from drowning a French lad who had fallen into the sea from a stone pier astern of the ship.

Details of Gillick's later life, death and burial are unknown.

== See also ==
- List of Medal of Honor recipients during peacetime
