= John F. Auer =

- Born: 1866; Nyack, New York, US
- Died: March 28, 1951 (aged 84–85); Nyack, New York, US
- Burial place: Oak Hill Cemetery
- Military career
- Allegiance: United States of America
- Branch: United States Navy
- Service years: c. 1882-c.1887
- Rank: Seaman Apprentice
- Unit: USS Lancaster
- Awards: Medal of Honor

John F. Auer (1866 – March 28, 1951) was a sailor in the United States Navy who was one of 193 people received the Medal of Honor in non-combat events, a practice no longer authorized by law, and one of only 3,449 recipients of the award.

== Early life and naval service ==
Auer was born in 1866 in Nyack, New York, the fifth of five children of Joseph Auer, a stable owner and harness maker. When he was sixteen years old, Auer joined the United States Navy because he wanted to see the world. After completing basic training he was assigned to the USS Lancaster, the flagship of the European Squadron as a Seaman Apprentice. On November 20, 1883, while the Lancaster was in port in Marseille, France, a young Frenchman who was on a stone pier astern of the Lancaster fell overboard, and disappeared below the water twice. Seeing him, and realizing that the boy could not swim, Auer jumped into the water together with Boatswain's Mate Matthew Gillick, and they were able to rescue the boy. For their heroism, both Auer and Gillick were awarded the United States' highest military decoration for gallantry, the Medal of Honor, on February 2, 1884. Before Seaman Auer left the Navy, the medal was stolen, though he wore the ribbon (and retained the citation) until his final years.

== Later life ==
Auer served in the Navy for five years, after which he returned to his native Nyack. He worked as a letter carrier at Nyack's post office, and kept the same route for over twenty years. Auer died on March 28, 1951.

== Medal of Honor citation ==
Rank and organization: Ordinary Seaman Apprentice, U.S. Navy. Born: 1866, New York. Accredited to: New York.

Citation:

On board the U.S.S. Lancaster, Marseille, France, 20 November 1883. Jumping overboard, Auer rescued from drowning a French lad who had fallen into the sea from a stone pier astern of the ship.

== See also ==
- List of Medal of Honor recipients in non-combat incidents
