= John Haley Bellamy =

American sculptor (1836–1914)

- John Haley Bellamy, circa 1856
- Born: April 5, 1836; Kittery, Maine, U.S.
- Died: April 6, 1914 (aged 78); Portsmouth, New Hampshire, U.S.
- Occupation: Wood carver
- Known for: Carving eagles

John Haley Bellamy (April 5, 1836 – April 6, 1914) was a folk artist of New England, USA, known for his highly stylized carved wooden eagles and other decorative items for ships and homes. Bellamy was born in Kittery, Maine in 1836, and stayed there for much of his career. Later in his life he lived and worked elsewhere in New England. Although carving was his primary means of supporting himself, he never considered himself to be an "artist," and he is not known to have signed any of his pieces. His eagles are highly desired in the collectors' market, with some selling in 2007 for over $100,000, and a large piece setting an artist-record price of $660,000 at an August 2005 auction. Bellamy died in Portsmouth, New Hampshire in 1914.

== Birth and family ==
John Haley Bellamy was born April 5, 1836, in the historic Pepperrell Mansion (originally built in 1683) in Kittery, Maine to Charles Gerrish Bellamy and Frances Keene Bellamy. Frances had originally been married to Charles' older brother, John Haley Bellamy, but he died three years after they were married, leaving Frances with two young daughters. There was some discrepancy in the marriage date of Charles and Frances as family records, smudged and altered, show it as being February 29, 1835, while town records mark it as being February 29, 1836, six weeks before John's birth. Besides his two half-sisters from his mother's previous marriage, Bellamy had eight other siblings.

== Career ==
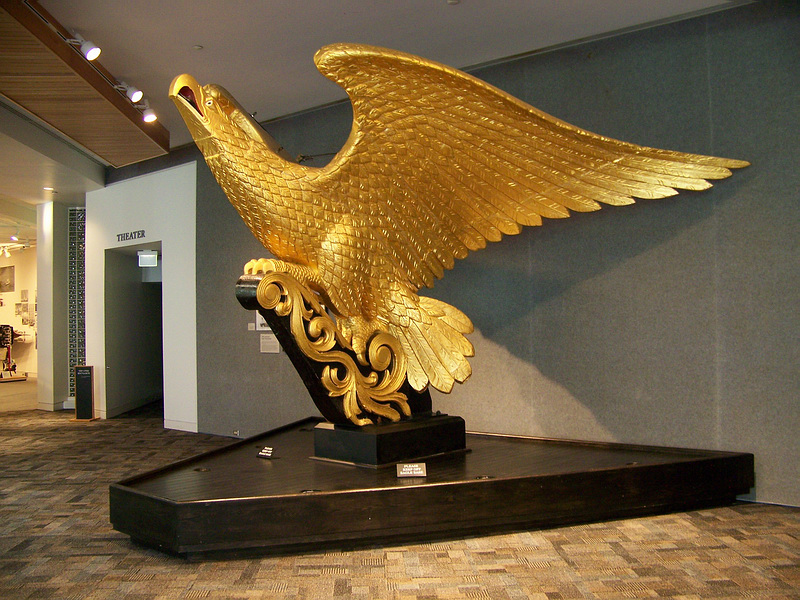
The USS Lancaster Eagle, Bellamy's last extant figurehead, displayed in the Mariners' Museum

Bellamy was apprenticed to Samuel Dockham, a furniture maker in Portsmouth, New Hampshire in his youth. In 1857, at the age of 21, Bellamy worked with the well known ship's carver Laban Beecher in Boston. Beecher is the carver responsible for the Andrew Jackson figurehead of USS Constitution that was very controversial and ended up being decapitated by vandals. Later in 1857, Bellamy left Beecher's shop and enrolled in school, possibly because there was not enough work for him to remain on.

Not much is known about Bellamy's career after his term at New Hampton Institute until the mid-1860s, when it was clear that he was carving for money in Boston. In the late 1860s, he entered into a partnership with D.A. Titcomb, a patent agent in Boston who managed to help sell and ship a large number of Bellamy's carving throughout the country. Between the years of 1867–1871, six styles of clock cases were patented by Bellamy. These featured Masonic symbols, Knights of Columbus emblems and Grand Army of the Republic insignia.

In 1872, Bellamy spent a short period as a first class carpenter, which he quickly quit when he realized it paid less than carving did. That winter Bellamy set up shop in Portsmouth, New Hampshire and began carving again. Many of the carvings he made there were eagles and many have since been lost. Bellamy was commissioned in 1880 to build a figurehead for USS Lancaster, which previously had not had a figurehead. For this he was paid two dollars and thirty-two cents a day. This piece, referred to as the USS Lancaster Eagle, is the only known surviving figurehead carved by Bellamy and is considered to be his masterpiece. It is currently owned by and displayed at The Mariners' Museum in Newport News, Virginia.

== Death ==
On December 5, 1910, after three years of declining health, John was declared incompetent by his doctor and went to live with a cousin in Portsmouth, New Hampshire. After outliving his parents and all of his siblings, John died of "apoplexy" on April 6, 1914. He was buried with the rest of the family in the First Baptist Church Cemetery in Kittery Point, Maine. Following his death, it was published in the Portsmouth Herald that "His name and his carvings will probably be known longer to the outside world than that of any other native born man from his town."

== Technique and the "Bellamy Eagle" ==
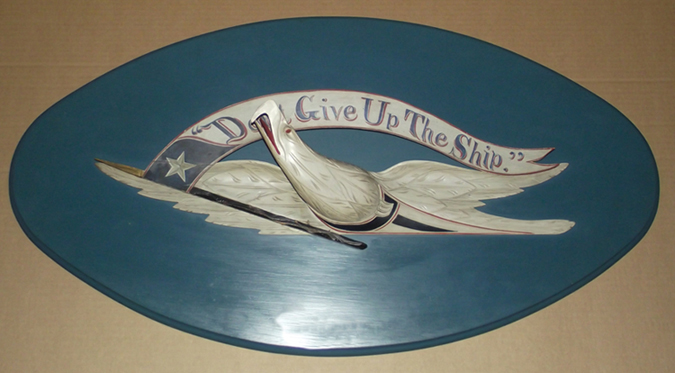
Bellamy eagle in the collection at The Mariners' Museum

John Haley Bellamy was known to carve other types of objects, but because he made eagles his specialty and they became so highly prized for their quality, his style has become known as the "Bellamy Eagle." While every eagle carved by Bellamy was unique, they had certain common characteristics. One of these was the beak, which was generally broad and flattened along the top and front with the top meeting or hanging over the bottom, giving it the look of a rectangular hook. The eyes were another tell-tale sign of an eagle carved by Bellamy as the eye sockets were generally heavily incised. A third common characteristic is the deep hollow beneath the wings that gave the eagles the illusion of lift and power in association with flight, which is visible in the Lancaster Eagle.
