= USS Lancaster (1858) =

Sloops-of-war of the United States Navy

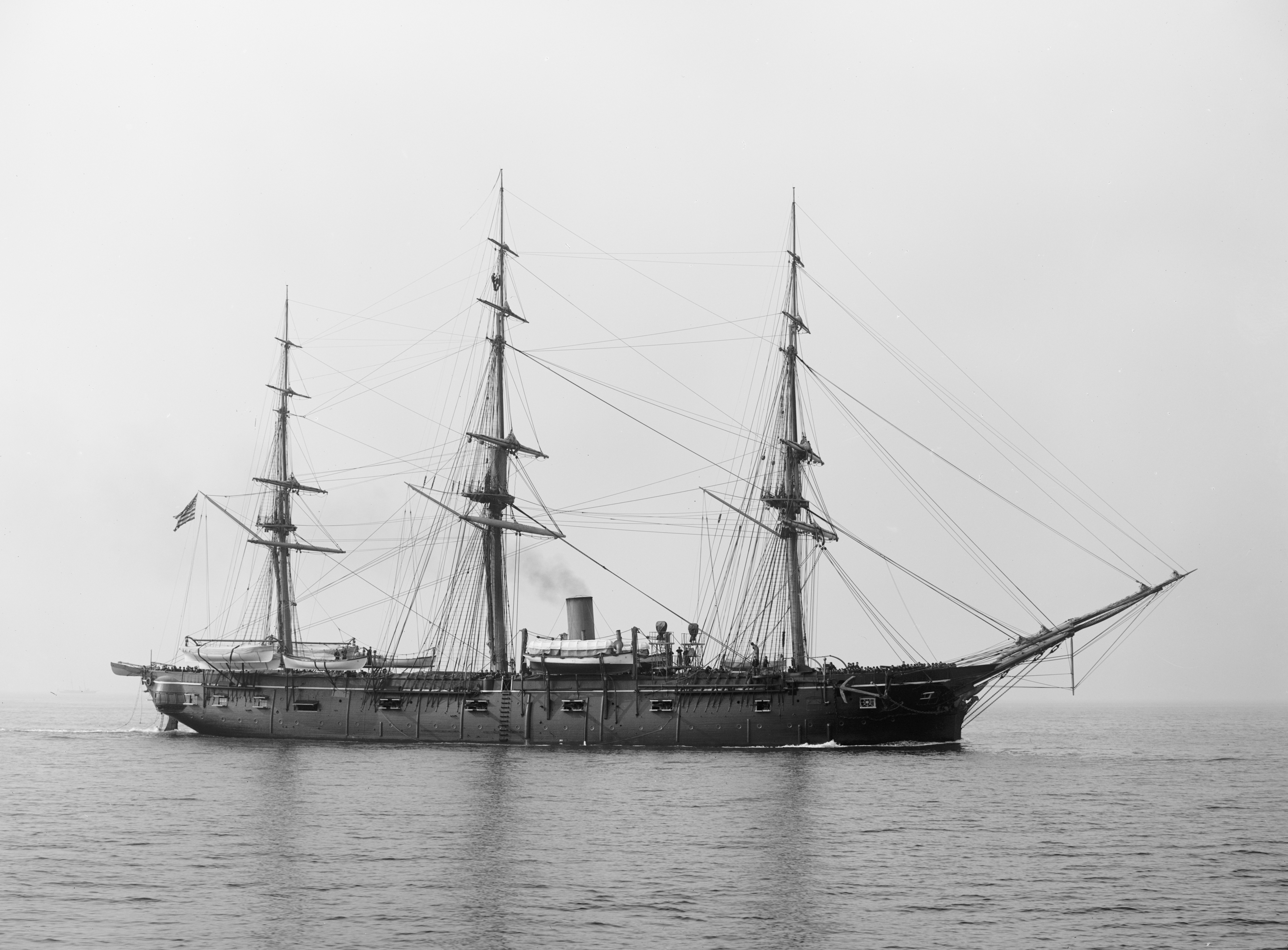
- USS Lancaster circa 1899

History

United States
- Name: USS Lancaster
- Laid down: December 1857
- Launched: 20 October 1858
- Commissioned: 12 May 1859
- Decommissioned: 1 May 1902
- Stricken: 31 December 1915
- Fate: Broken up, 1933

General characteristics
- Type: Sloop-of-war
- Displacement: 2,362 long tons (2,400 t)
- Length: 235 ft 8 in (71.83 m)
- Beam: 46 ft (14 m)
- Draft: 18 ft 6 in (5.64 m)
- Propulsion: Steam engine
- Speed: 10 knots (19 km/h; 12 mph)
- Complement: 367 officers and enlisted
- Armament: 24 × 9 in (230 mm) smoothbore Dahlgren guns; 2 × 30-pounder Parrott rifles

The first USS Lancaster was a screw sloop-of-war in the United States Navy during the American Civil War through the Spanish–American War.

The first Lancaster was laid down by the Philadelphia Navy Yard in December 1857; launched 20 October 1858; sponsored by Miss Harriet Lane, niece and official hostess of President James Buchanan; and commissioned 12 May 1859, Captain John Rudd in command.

== Service history ==
=== 1859–1867 ===
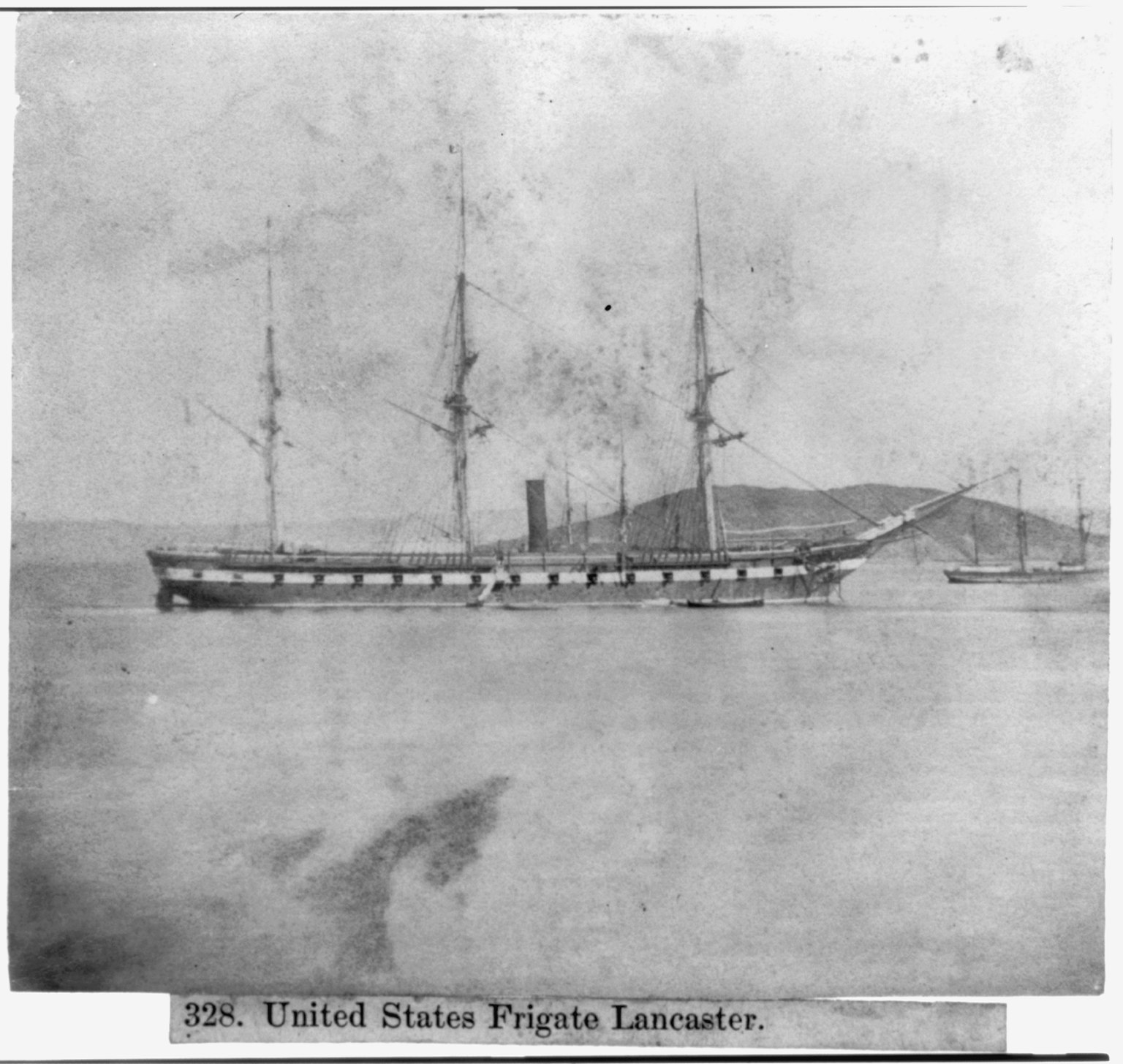
Lancaster before 1866

The new screw sloop-of-war departed Delaware Bay on 27 July 1859 for the Pacific, with Jordan Collins at the helm. After rounding Cape Horn she reached Panama Bay on 6 December. Two days later, Flag Officer John B. Montgomery hoisted his flag above Lancaster, and she served as flagship of the Pacific Squadron until 1866, cruising along the coast of South and Central America, Mexico, and California to protect American commerce and the Pacific mail steamers. On 23 February, Rear Admiral Charles H. Bell reported an incident which typified her service during the Civil War: "Such is the present state of affairs at Acapulco, that it is believed by both native and foreign populations that the presence of man-of-war alone prevented an attempt to sack and destroy the town by the Indians in the interior, encouraged by governor, General Alvarez ..." Far from the main theaters of the Civil War, a U.S. naval vessel was carrying out the traditional mission of protecting U.S. interests and keeping the peace.

On 11 November 1864, a secret expedition of boats from the ship captured a party of Confederate officers aboard the passenger steamer Salvador, off the Bay of Panama. They had planned to seize the Salvador for the Confederate Government and convert her into a raider to capture Union gold shipments from California.

In the spring of 1866, Lancaster received extensive repairs at the Mare Island Navy Yard and on 27 June sailed from San Francisco, California for the east coast, via Panama Bay, Callao, Valparaíso, Barbados, and Nassau. She arrived Norfolk Navy Yard on 8 March 1867 and decommissioned on the 19th.

=== 1869–1889 ===
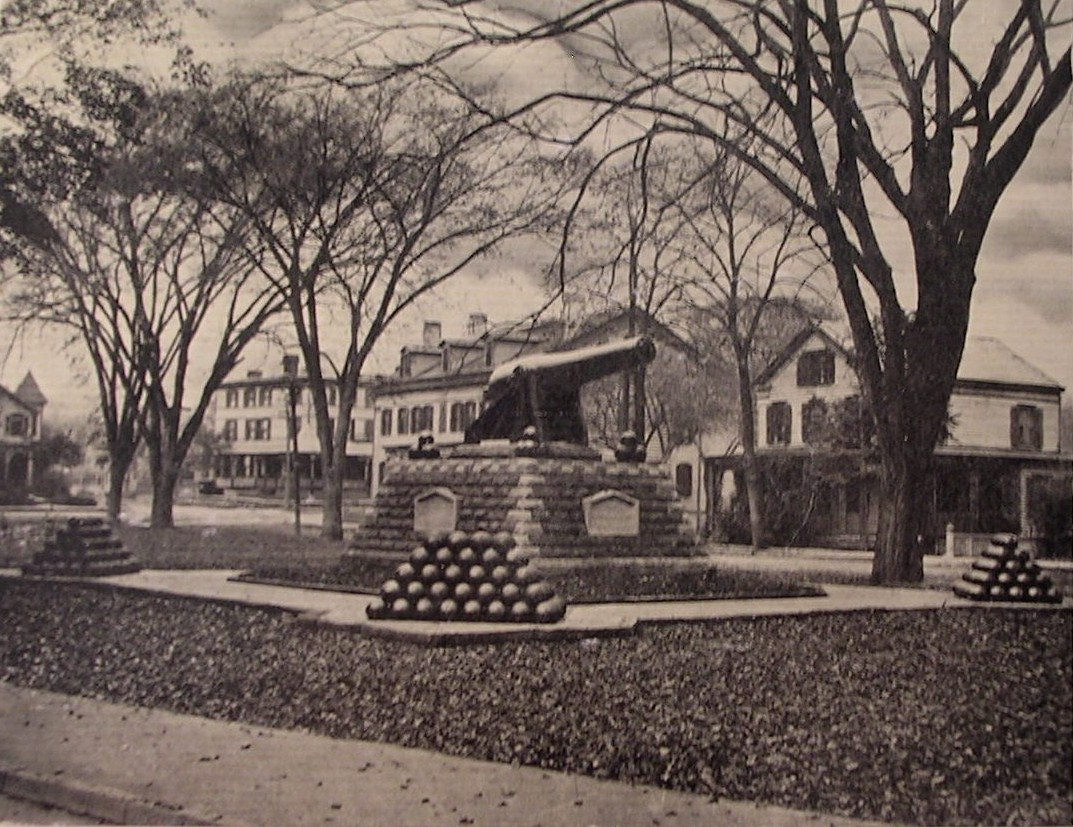
A cannon from Lancaster that stood in West Park in Stamford, Connecticut from Memorial Day, 1901 until 1942, when it was hauled away as scrap metal during World War II. Cast at West Point in 1827, it had also been used on Kearsarge and stood in the park as the "Kearsarge Memorial Gun".

Recommissioned on 26 August 1869, Lancaster sailed for the South Atlantic via Funchal, Madeira. Under the command of William B. Cushing, she arrived at Rio de Janeiro on 6 January 1870 and served as flagship of the squadron until 1875. From January to May 1874, she took part in fleet drills in the North Atlantic and was in the force concentrated at Key West lest war with Spain break out over the "Virginius affair". Spanish officials at Santiago de Cuba had seized American filibustering steamer Virginius and executed a part of her crew. After diplomatic efforts resolved the controversy peacefully, Lancaster returned to the South Atlantic until she departed Rio de Janeiro on 21 May 1875 for home, arriving at Portsmouth, New Hampshire, 12 July. The ship decommissioned 31 July 1875, and laid up for repairs at the Portsmouth Navy Yard. At this time a figurehead of an eagle carved by John Haley Bellamy was installed. The figurehead is now on display at The Mariners' Museum in Newport News, Virginia.

Lancaster recommissioned on 26 August 1881 and on 12 September sailed from Portsmouth for Europe. Arrived at Gibraltar 9 November, she became flagship of the European Squadron and during the following years cruised extensively in the Mediterranean, northern European waters, and on the coast of Africa, protecting American citizens and commerce and promoting friendly relations with other countries. From 27 June – 20 July 1882 the flagship was at Alexandria, Egypt, during a series of riots and was present when the British fleet bombarded the forts 11 July. Rear Admiral James W. Nicholson, commanding the U.S. squadron, welcomed on board both American and foreign refugees for protection, and landed a force of 100 men to guard the American consulate and assist in extinguishing fires, in burying the dead, and in preserving order. Rear Adm. Charles Henry Baldwin relieved Rear Admiral Nicholson of command of the squadron 10 March 1883. Acting under instructions from the Navy Department, Admiral Baldwin proceeded in Lancaster to Kronstadt, Russia, and on 27 May he and his staff attended the coronation of Tsar Alexander III at Moscow.

On 20 November 1883, while Lancaster was in port in Marseille, France, a young Frenchman who was on a stone pier astern of the ship fell overboard, and disappeared below the water twice. John F. Auer, a sailor on the Lancaster, saw him and, realizing that the boy could not swim, jumped into the water together with Boatswain's Mate Matthew Gillick, and rescued the boy. For this act, both Auer and Gillick were awarded the United States' highest military decoration, the Medal of Honor, on 2 February 1884. On 2 August 1884, she ran aground in the Solent.

Early in 1885 Lancaster cruised down the west coast of Africa and arrived in the Congo River 28 April en route to Brazil. She arrived at Rio de Janeiro 1 July and served as flagship of the squadron until 1888, cruising along the coasts of South America and Africa conducting squadron drills and exercises.

Lancaster sailed 18 January 1888 from Montevideo for Europe arriving Gibraltar on 6 April. As flagship of the European Squadron she cruised in the Mediterranean until she departed Gibraltar 2 July 1889 and returned to the United States via Funchal, Madeira, arriving at New York 8 August. She decommissioned at the New York Navy Yard 7 September 1889 and was towed to the Portsmouth yard for repairs.

=== 1891–1897 ===
Recommissioned 19 March 1891, Lancaster proceeded to New York where Rear Adm. David B. Harmony broke his flag in her on 23 June. She departed New York 13 July en route to the Far East via Madeira, Cape Town, and Singapore. She arrived at Hong Kong 4 January 1892 and served as flagship of the Asiatic Squadron until 1894, cruising extensively on the coast of China and in Japanese waters. It was during this time Fred J. Buenzle had served aboard the Lancaster, as noted in Bluejacket; An Autobiography, a part of the Classics of Naval Literature series. She sailed from Hong Kong 15 February 1894 for the United States, via the Suez Canal, and arrived at New York 8 June. The ship decommissioned at the New York Navy Yard on 30 June 1894.

Lancaster recommissioned 12 September 1895 and was ordered to the South Atlantic Squadron. On 22 October, she proceeded to Newport, Rhode Island, and on 4 November stood out for the South Atlantic, via Madeira and the Cape Verde Islands. The ship arrived at Montevideo, Uruguay, 13 February 1896. She operated on the coast of South America until the following year, based at Montevideo, and serving part-time as flagship of the squadron. On 5 September 1897 she sailed from base for the United States, arrived Boston 18 November, and decommissioned there 31 December 1897.

=== 1898–1915 ===
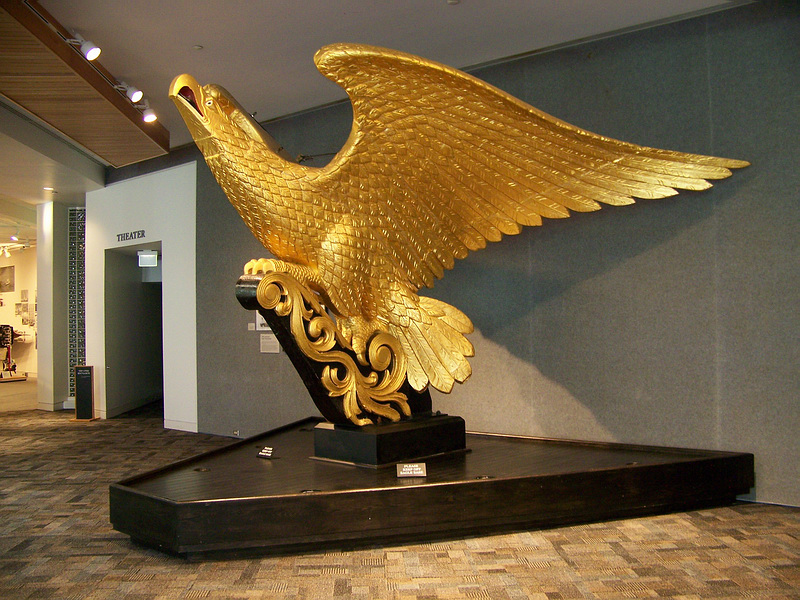
Lancaster's eagle figurehead, now at the Mariners' Museum.

After the outbreak of the Spanish–American War, Lancaster recommissioned 5 May 1898, sailed on the 19th, and arrived on the 31st at Key West, Florida, where she served as station ship during the conflict. Departing Key West 18 August, the ship arrived at Portsmouth 3 September. Assigned to duty as a gunnery training ship, Lancaster departed Portsmouth 8 January 1899 and cruised along the Atlantic coast and in the West Indies. From 3 June 1900 to 4 March 1901 she made a cruise to European waters, returning to the United States via the West Indies and La Guaira, Venezuela. She continued cruising the Atlantic training landsmen until she decommissioned at the Philadelphia Navy Yard 1 May 1902. Lancaster served as receiving ship at the Philadelphia Navy Yard, 16 November 1903 to 31 March 1912, and was transferred to the Treasury Department's Bureau of Public Health Service, on 1 February 1913. Her name was stricken from the Navy list on 31 December 1915.

Lancaster served the U.S. Public Health Service as a quarantine detention ship at Reedy Island, Delaware, Quarantine Station until 1920, then was transferred to the New York Quarantine Station for similar use. Her hull was broken in 1933.

Her gold eagle figurehead is now displayed at the Mariners' Museum in Newport News, Virginia.

== See also ==
- Bibliography of early American naval history
- List of sloops of war of the United States Navy
