= Matasnillo River =

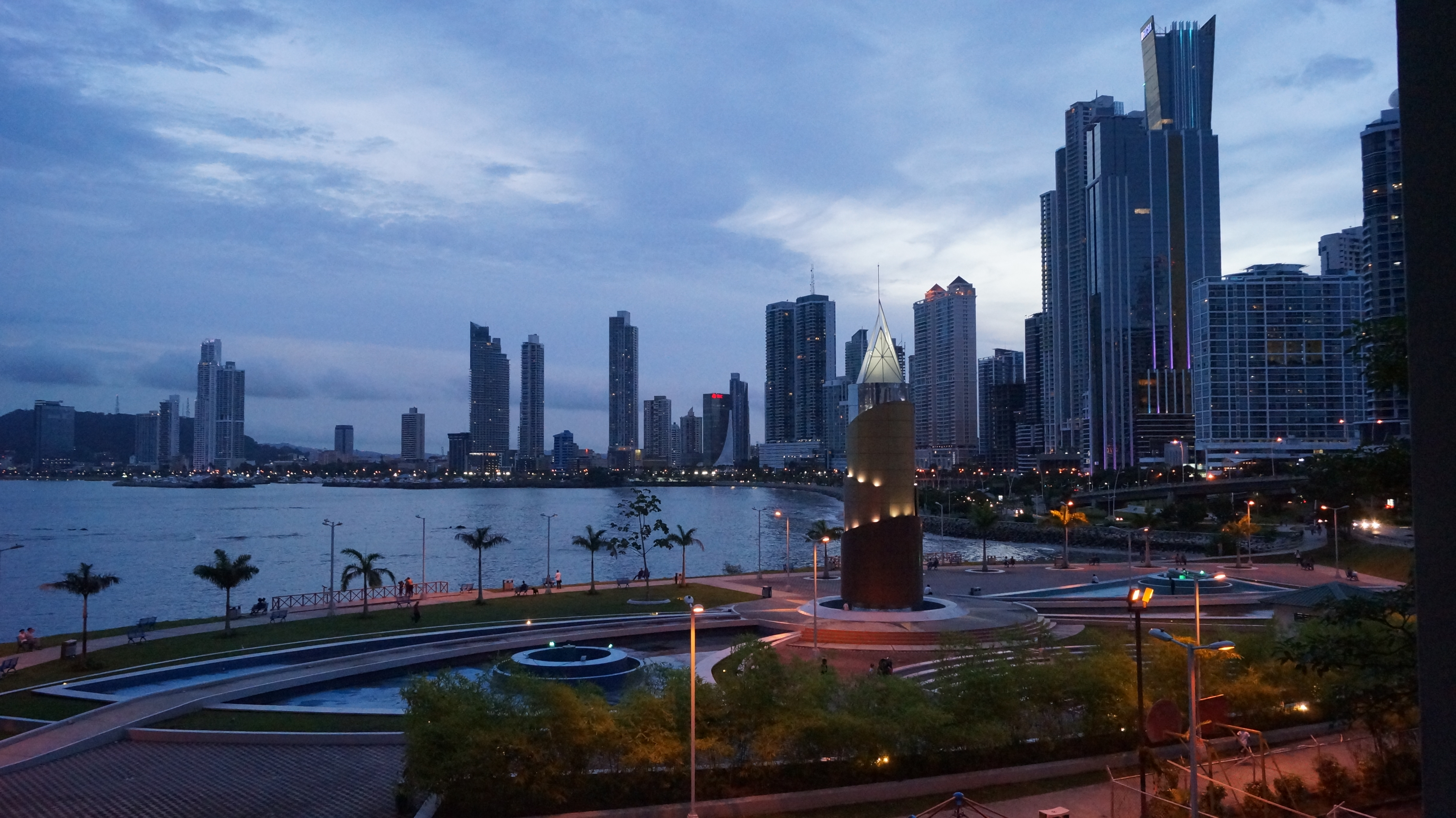

Location
- Country: Panama

Physical characteristics
- Source
  - elevation: 200 m (660 ft)
- Mouth: Panama Bay
  - location: Panama City
  - coordinates: 8°58′27″N 79°31′07″W
  - elevation: sea level
- Length: 12.5 km (7.8 mi)
- Basin size: 583 km^{2} (225 sq mi)

The Matasnillo River (also spelled Mataznillo) is a river in Panama, traversing southward from the hills north of Panama City through the heart of the city before entering Panama Bay and the Pacific Ocean.

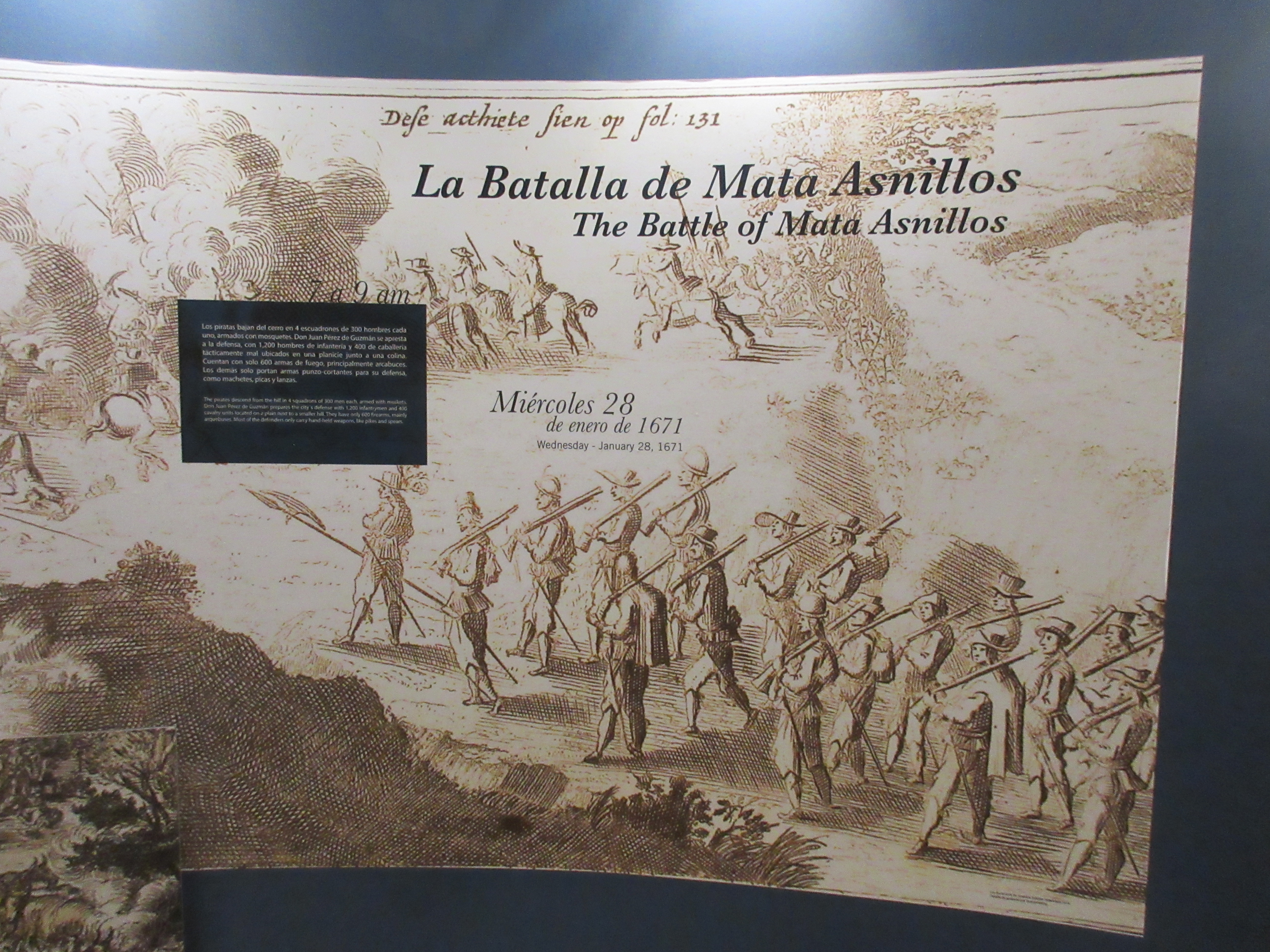
The Battle of Mata Asnillos took place before the sack of Panama by Henry Morgan in 1671

== Geography ==
The river is 12.5 kilometres (7.8 mi) long, draining 583 square kilometres (225 mi^{2}) and dropping 200 metres (660 ft) in elevation between source and mouth. The river course cuts through heavily built-up areas of Panama City, subjecting it to both industrial and residential pollution. The level of water contamination was rated as "critical", making it unfit for consumption or recreation.

The river empties into the Panama Bay at the juncture of the Marbella and Punta Paitilla neighborhoods.
