= William J. Bordelon =

United States Marine Corps Medal of Honor recipient (1920–1943)

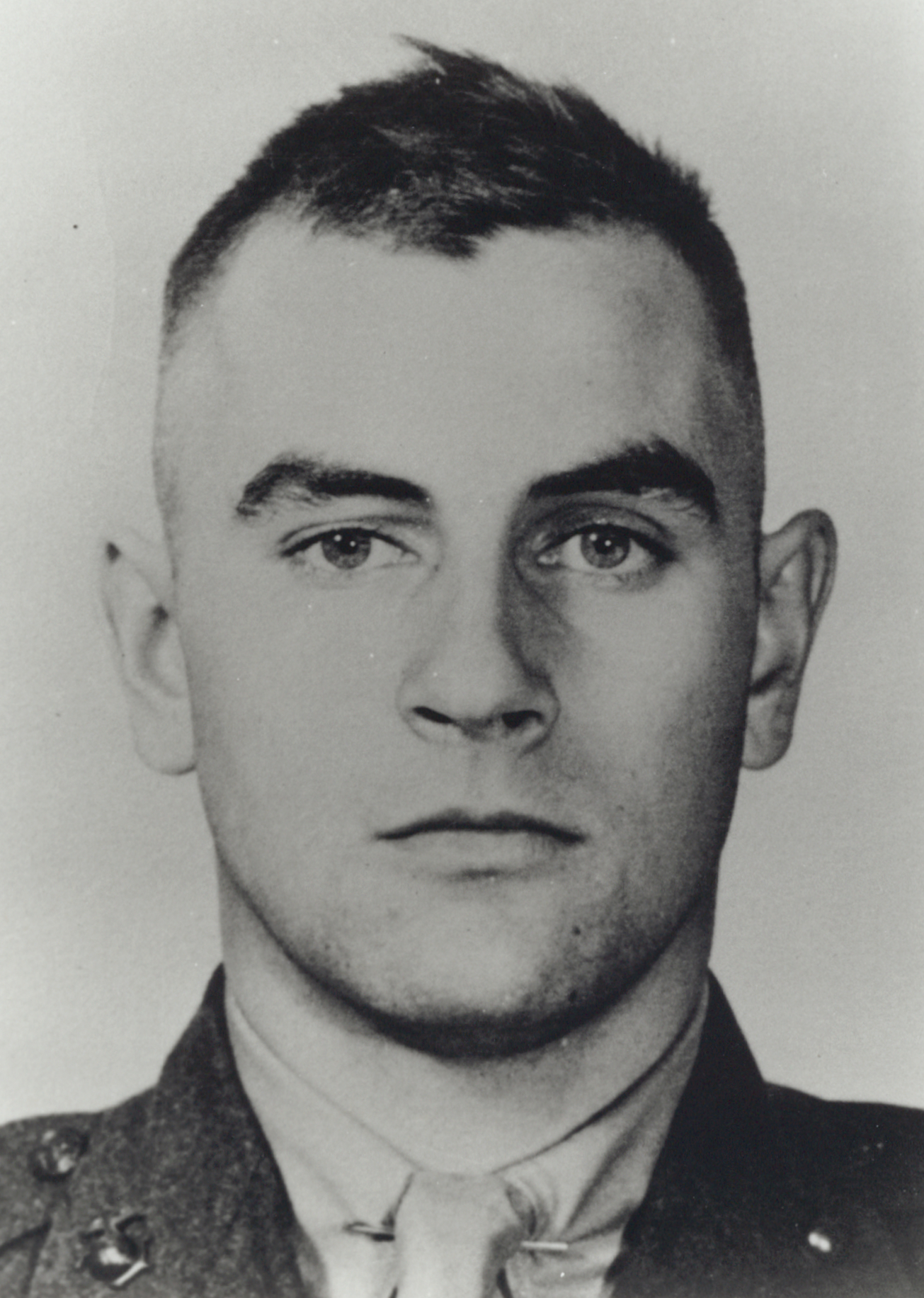
- William J. Bordelon, Medal of Honor recipient
- Born: December 25, 1920; San Antonio, Texas
- Died: November 20, 1943 (aged 22); Tarawa Atoll, Gilbert Islands
- Burial place: Fort Sam Houston National Cemetery, San Antonio, Texas
- Military career
- Allegiance: United States of America
- Branch: United States Marine Corps
- Service years: 1941–1943
- Rank: Staff Sergeant
- Unit: 1st Battalion, 18th Marines
- Conflicts: World War II: Battle of Tarawa †
- Awards: Medal of Honor; Purple Heart

William James Bordelon Jr. (December 25, 1920 – November 20, 1943) was a United States Marine who served in combat during World War II. During the Battle of Tarawa, he was killed in action while he led the assault on the enemy and rescued fellow Marines. For his acts of gallantry, he was posthumously awarded the United States' highest military honor — the Medal of Honor. He was the first U.S. Marine from Texas to be awarded the Medal of Honor for action in World War II.

== Biography ==
William Bordelon was born on December 25, 1920, in San Antonio, Texas. He graduated from Central Catholic Marianist High School in San Antonio in 1938, where he was the JROTC battalion major in 1937–1938. He was one of three of the high school's graduates who died on Tarawa.

He enlisted in the Marine Corps on December 10, 1941, and completed his recruit training at Marine Corps Recruit Depot, San Diego, California. He joined the 2nd Engineer Battalion, 2nd Marine Division, in San Diego. He was rapidly promoted — to private first class on February 5, 1942; to corporal on March 14, 1942; and to sergeant on July 10, 1942.

He was killed in action, at age 22, while serving as a member of an assault engineer platoon of the First Battalion, Eighteenth Marines, tactically attached to the 2nd Marine Division against the Japanese in the Battle of Tarawa, in the Gilbert Islands on November 20, 1943. He single-handedly destroyed four enemy pillboxes before he was fatally wounded.

Bordelon was awarded the Medal of Honor for his "valorous and gallant conduct above and beyond the call of duty" in leading his men while seriously wounded. He was the first U.S. Marine from Texas to be awarded the Medal of Honor for actions in World War II. Four Medals of Honor were awarded for actions on Tarawa, three were posthumous awards, and the fourth was awarded to then-Colonel David M. Shoup, who became the 22nd Commandant of the Marine Corps.

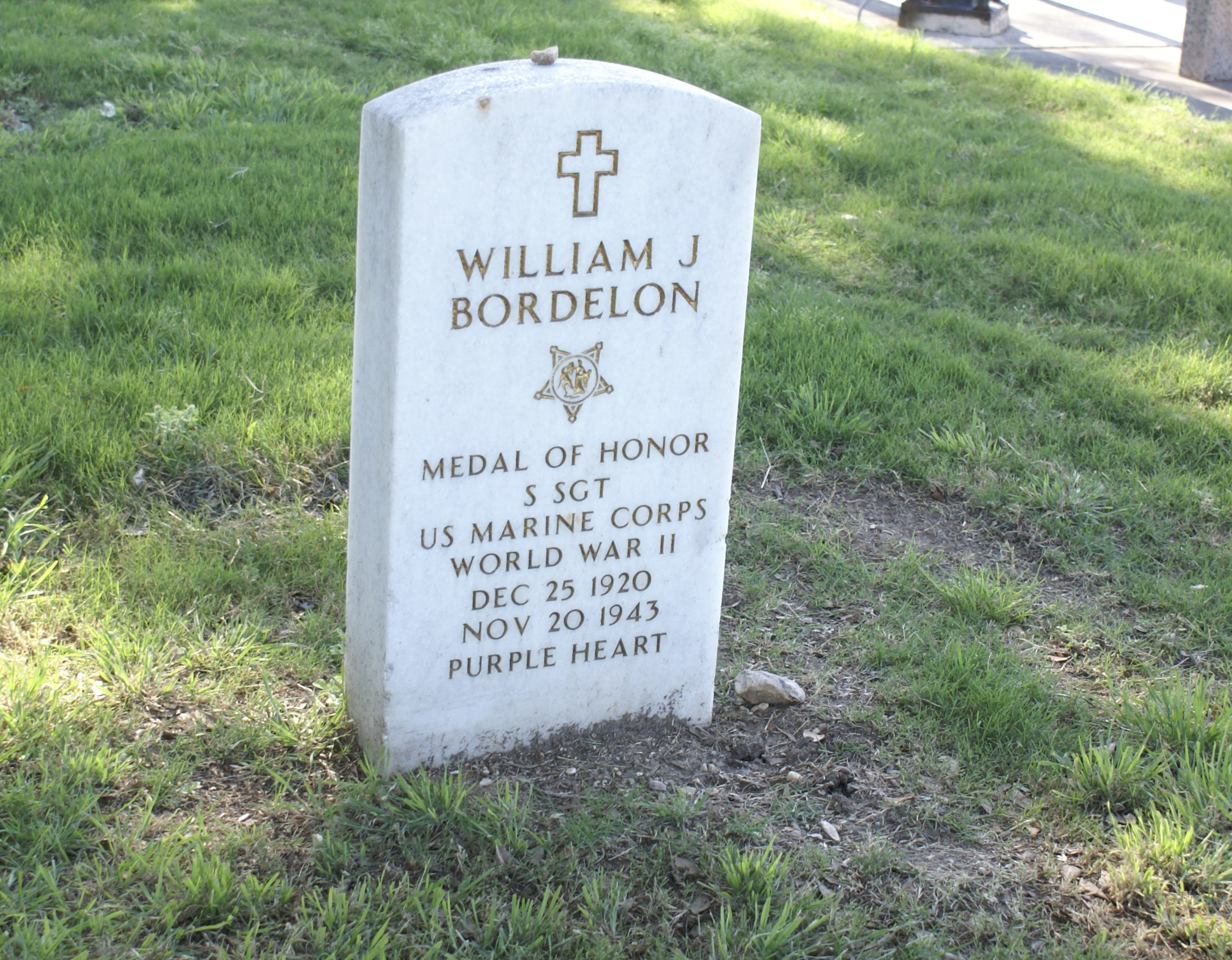
Grave marker of William J. Bordelon, Jr. at Fort Sam Houston National Cemetery

He was originally buried in the Lone Palm Cemetery on Betio Island, Tarawa Atoll, then later interred in Honolulu, Hawaii at the National Memorial Cemetery of the Pacific. At the request of his brother, Bordelon's body was moved from Hawaii to Texas in 1995. After lying in state at the Alamo, Bordelon's body was re-interred in the Fort Sam Houston National Cemetery, San Antonio, Texas, on the 52nd anniversary of his death.

== Awards and decorations ==

Medal of Honor
Purple Heart	Combat Action Ribbon	Navy Presidential Unit Citation
American Campaign Medal	Asiatic-Pacific Campaign Medal w/ at least 1 service star	World War II Victory Medal

== Medal of Honor citation ==
The President of the United States takes pleasure in presenting the CONGRESSIONAL MEDAL OF HONOR posthumously to

STAFF SERGEANT WILLIAM J. BORDELON
UNITED STATES MARINE CORPS

for service as set forth in the following CITATION:

For valorous and gallant conduct above and beyond the call of duty as a member of an Assault Engineer Platoon of the First Battalion, Eighteenth Marines, tactically attached to the Second Marines, Second Marine Division, in action against the Japanese-held Atoll of Tarawa in the Gilbert Islands on November 20, 1943. Landing in the assault waves under withering enemy fire which killed all but four of the men in his tractor, Staff Sergeant Bordelon hurriedly made demolition charges and personally put two pill boxes out of action. Hit by enemy machine-gun fire just as a charge exploded in his hand while assaulting a third position, he courageously remained in action and, although out of demolition, provided himself with a rifle and furnished fire coverage for a group of men scaling the seawall. Disregarding his own serious condition, he unhesitatingly went to the aid of one of his demolition men, wounded and calling for help in the water, rescuing this man and another who had been hit by enemy fire while attempting to make the rescue. Still refusing first aid for himself, he again made up demolition charges and single-handedly assaulted a fourth Japanese machine-gun position but was instantly killed when caught in a final burst of fire from the enemy. Staff Sergeant Bordelon's great personal valor during a critical phase of securing the limited beachhead was a contributing factor in the ultimate occupation of the island and his heroic determination reflects the highest credit upon the United States Naval Service. He gallantly gave his life for his country.

/S/FRANKLIN D. ROOSEVELT

== Honors ==
The destroyer USS Bordelon (DD-881) was named in his honor in 1945, and in April 1994, the Navy named San Antonio's Navy-Marine Corps Reserve Center after him. Also named for Bordelon is a Marine Corps and Navy VFW post and a section of Interstate 37 which runs through San Antonio, between I-35 and I-10. The workout and ceremony field on Camp H. M. Smith, Marine Corps Base Hawaii is named Bordelon Field in his honor.

Bordelon's alma mater, Central Catholic Marianist High School in San Antonio, has memorialized him in several ways. Central Catholic's nationally ranked junior ROTC rifle team is called the Bordelon Rifles in his honor. On November 3, 2007, the "William J. Bordelon Memorial" in the school's main foyer was dedicated. The memorial also remembers fellow high school graduates and Marines who died on Tarawa — Gene Seng, Jr. and Charles Montague.

== See also ==
- List of Medal of Honor recipients for World War II
