= George Belknap =

George Eugene Belknap
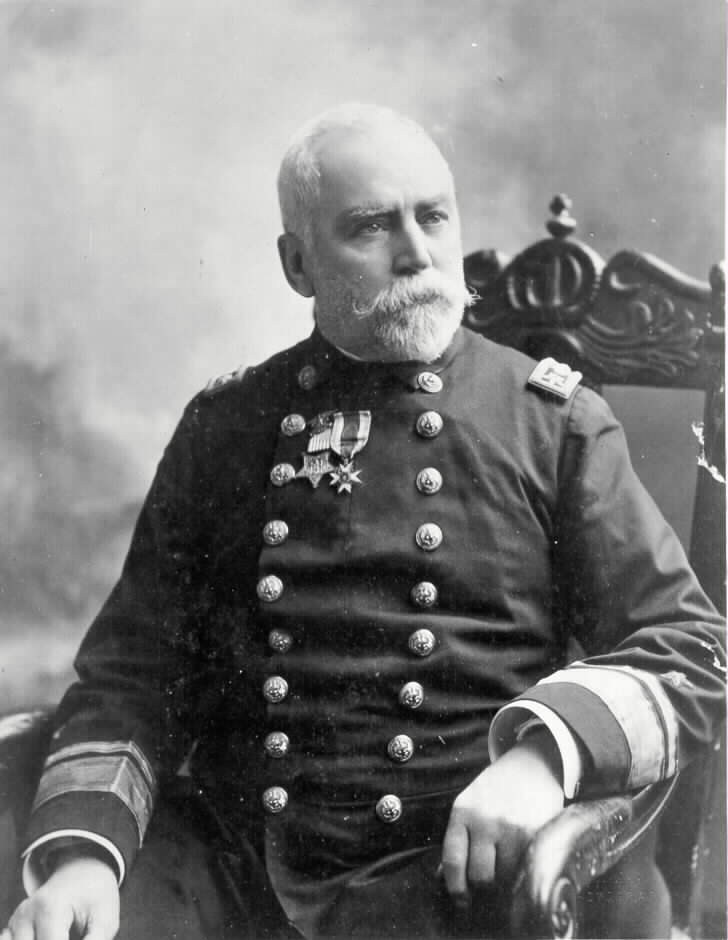
- Born: January 22, 1832; Newport, New Hampshire, U.S.
- Died: April 7, 1903 (aged 71); Key West, Florida, U.S.
- Relatives: Rear Admiral Reginald R. Belknap (son) (1871–1959)
- Military career
- Allegiance: United States of America
- Branch: United States Navy
- Service years: 1847–1894
- Rank: Rear Admiral
- Commands: Asiatic Squadron; Mare Island Naval Shipyard; U.S. Naval Observatory; USS Tuscarora; USS Hartford; USS Canonicus; USS Alaska
- Conflicts: American Civil War; Formosa Expedition

George Eugene Belknap (22 January 1832 – 7 April 1903) was a rear admiral in the United States Navy. USS Belknap (DD-251) was named for him.

== Naval career ==
Born in Newport, New Hampshire, Belknap was appointed a Midshipman in 1847. He commanded the monitor Canonicus during the attacks on Fort Fisher, and the sloop-of-war Hartford during the Formosa Expedition of 1867. Belknap was the senior officer present during the riots following David Kalākaua's election as the King of Hawaii in 1874. At the time, he was serving as commander of the sloop-of-war Tuscarora on a mission to take deep-sea soundings in the North Pacific to help identify the best route for a submarine cable between the United States and Japan. This voyage led to the discovery of the Kuril–Kamchatka Trench and the Aleutian Trench.

Belknap commanded the United States Naval Observatory from 1885 to 1886 and the Mare Island Naval Shipyard from 1886 to 1890. Belknap was appointed as a rear admiral on 12 February 1889. He served as the Commander of the Asiatic Squadron from 4 April 1889 to 20 February 1892. He retired from the Navy on 22 January 1894.

In August 1902, Belknap and his wife visited the United Kingdom, including Devonport as guests of Rear Admiral William Hannam Henderson, the Admiral Superintendent of the dockyard.

Belknap and his wife lived in Brookline, Massachusetts after his retirement. On 7 April 1903, he died at Key West, Florida while on a working vacation to advise the Navy Department on a potential naval base location. On 13 April 1903, Belknap was buried with full military honors at Arlington National Cemetery. The funeral procession from St. John's Episcopal Church was accompanied by two battalions of U.S Marines and one battalion of U.S. Army engineers.

== Memberships ==
Belknap was a member of the Grand Army of the Republic, a Veteran Companion of the Military Order of the Loyal Legion of the United States (MOLLUS) and an Honorary Companion of the Military Order of Foreign Wars. He was also a member of the New Hampshire Society of the Sons of the American Revolution.

== Legacy ==
A portrait of Admiral Belknap is on display in Luce Hall at the United States Naval War College in Newport, Rhode Island.

== Family ==
He was the father of Rear Admiral Reginald R. Belknap who served as national Commander-in-Chief of MOLLUS from 1947 to 1951.

== Dates of rank ==
- Midshipman – October 8, 1847
- Passed Midshipman – June 10, 1853
- Master – September 15, 1855

Lieutenant	Lieutenant Commander	Commander	Captain	Commodore	Rear Admiral
O-3	O-4	O-5	O-6	O-7	O-8
September 16, 1855	July 15, 1862	July 15, 1866	January 25, 1875	June 2, 1885	February 12, 1889

== Attribution ==
Military offices
Preceded by Ralph Chandler	Commander, Asiatic Squadron; 4 April 1889–20 February 1892	Succeeded by David B. Harmony
