= USS Bordelon =

Gearing-class destroyer (1945–1977)

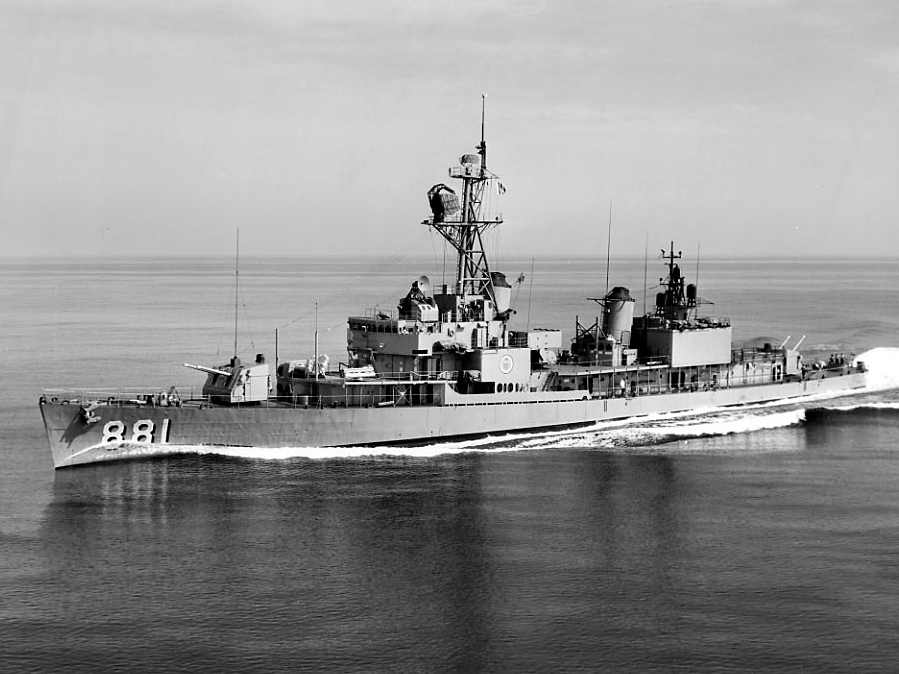
- USS Bordelon in 1964

History

United States
- Name: USS Bordelon
- Namesake: William J. Bordelon
- Builder: Consolidated Steel Corporation
- Laid down: 9 September 1944
- Launched: 3 March 1945
- Commissioned: 5 June 1945
- Decommissioned: 1 February 1977
- Stricken: 1 February 1977
- Identification: Callsign: NBHW; Hull number: DD-881
- Motto: Remis Velisque
- Fate: Transferred to Iran 1 July 1977

General characteristics as originally built
- Class & type: Gearing-class destroyer
- Displacement: 2,616 tons standard; 3,460 tons full load
- Length: 390.5 ft (119.0 m)
- Beam: 40.9 ft (12.5 m)
- Draught: 14.3 ft (4.4 m)
- Propulsion: 2 shafts; General Electric steam turbines; 4 boilers; 60,000 shp (45,000 kW)
- Speed: 36.8 kn (68.2 km/h; 42.3 mph)
- Range: 4,500 nmi (8,330 km; 5,180 mi) at 20 knots (37 km/h; 23 mph)
- Armament: Six 5"/38 cal. dual purpose guns in three twin mounts

USS Bordelon (DD/DDR-881) was one of 98 World War II Gearing-class destroyers of the United States Navy, and was named for Marine Staff Sergeant William J. Bordelon (1920–1943), who was posthumously awarded the Medal of Honor for his heroism in the Battle of Tarawa.

Bordelon was laid down by the Consolidated Steel Corporation at Orange, Texas on 9 September 1944, launched on 3 March 1945 by Mrs. W. J. Bordelon, the mother of Staff Sergeant Bordelon, and commissioned on 5 June 1945.

== Service history ==
Bordelon operated as a part of the occupation force in Japan until March 1946, then alternated operations along the east coast and in the Caribbean with the 2nd Fleet with deployments to the Mediterranean with the 6th Fleet. In October 1962 the Bordelon deployed from its home port of Charleston, SC to the Caribbean to participate in the blockade of Russian ships during the Cuban Crisis. Bordelon assisted in fighting the fire on the cruiser Belknap after Belknap's collision with the aircraft carrier John F. Kennedy on the night of 22 November 1975.

On 14 September 1976, while refueling alongside USS John F. Kennedy, the ships came together and collided. Bordelon's port bow and some of the superstructure were damaged and the main mast snapped and fell on the signal shack, injuring some of the handling team.

The ammunition ship Mount Baker was also involved in the rescue of Bordelon by escorting her to an ammunition depot where Mount Baker's explosive ordnance disposal (EOD) team off-loaded her entire cargo of ammunition while providing electric and water services.

Due to the damage to the superstructure and electronics and the age and condition of the hull, Bordelon was decommissioned and struck from the Naval Vessel Register on 1 February 1977, transferred to Iran in July 1977, and cannibalized for spare parts.
