= Panama Bay =

Bay in Panama

Designations

Ramsar Wetland
- Official name: Bahía de Panamá
- Designated: 20 October 2003
- Reference no.: 1319

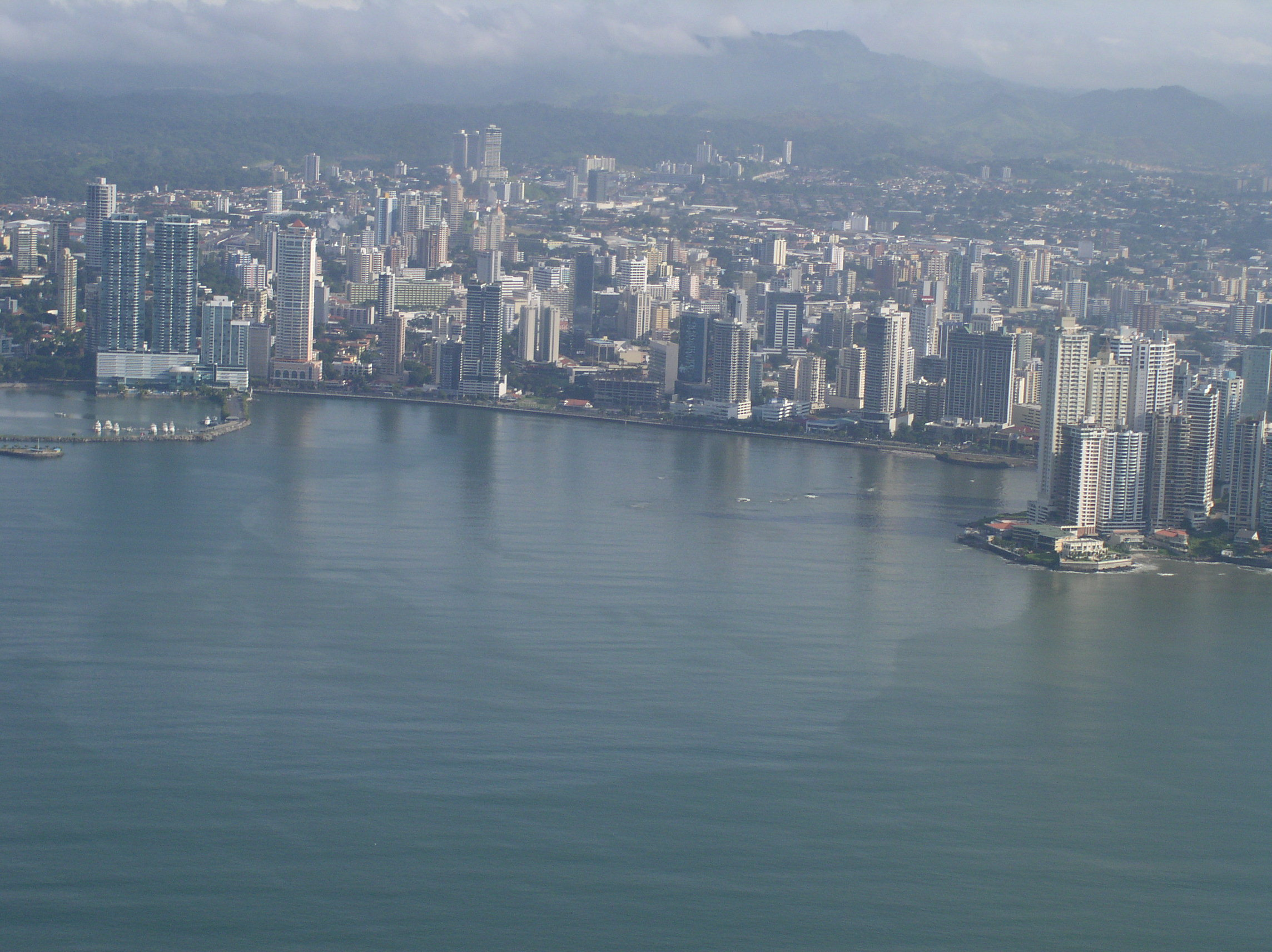
Aerial View of Panama Bay with Panama City in the background.

The Panama Bay (Spanish: Bahia de Panamá) is a large body of water off the coast of southern Panama, at 8.8333333°N 79.25°W. It is a part of the greater Gulf of Panama.

== Mangroves ==
86 miles of mangroves run along the rural coasts of Panama Bay, protecting Panama City and agricultural areas from storms.

== Pollution problems ==
The Panama Bay is considered to be in an eutrophic state by the World Resources Institute. This is a result of ongoing pollution from agricultural and livestock operations. Urban wastewater from nearby Panama City has also contributed to the eutrophication of Panama Bay.

== See also ==
- Matasnillo River
