= Robert H. Wyman =

American Navy admiral (1822–1882)

Rear Admiral Robert Harris Wyman
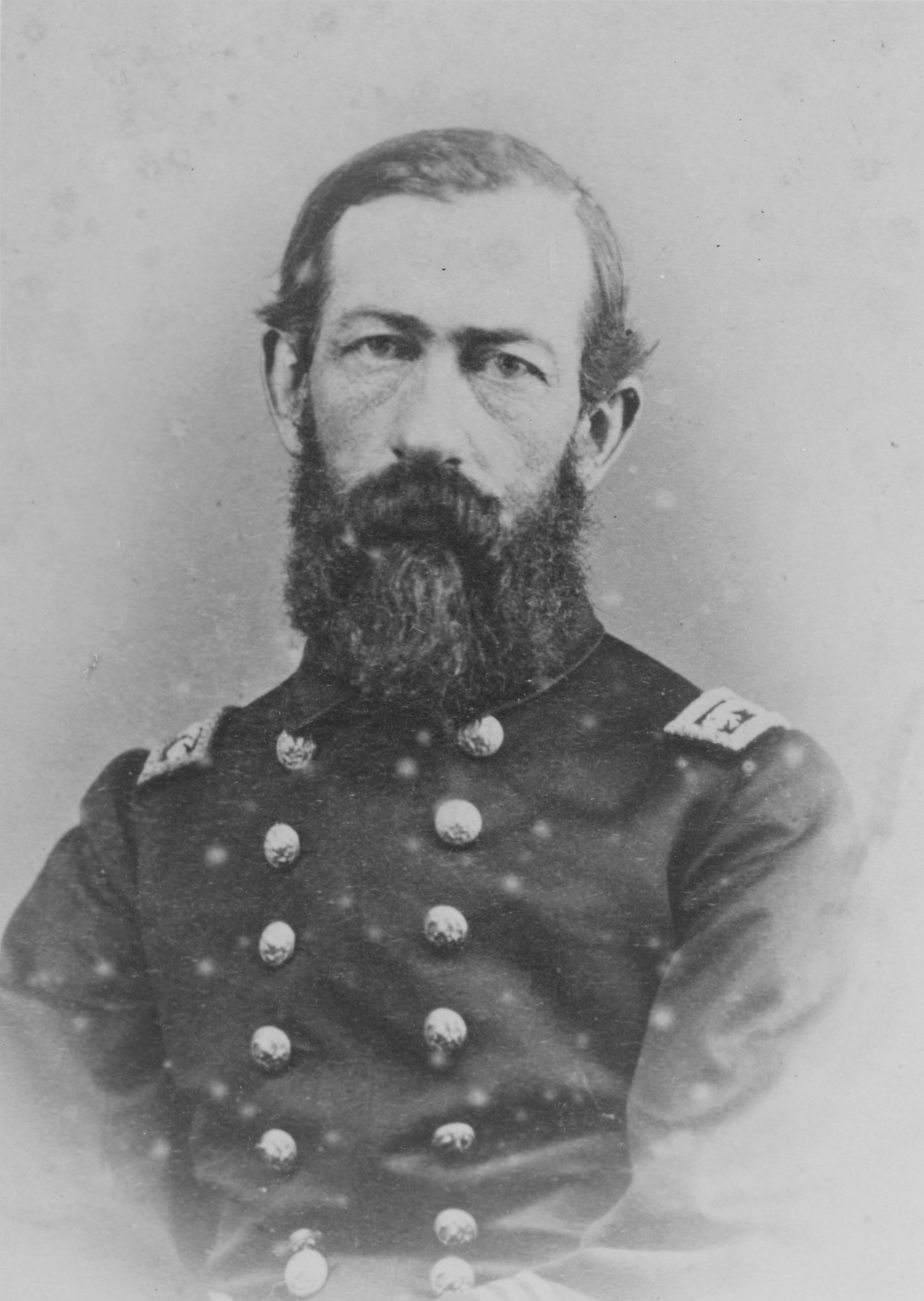
- Wyman as a Navy captain
- Born: 12 July 1822; Portsmouth, New Hampshire, U.S.
- Died: 2 December 1882 (aged 60); Washington, D.C., U.S.
- Burial place: Oak Hill Cemetery; Washington, D.C., U.S.
- Military career
- Allegiance: United States of America
- Branch: United States Navy
- Service years: 1837–1882
- Rank: Rear Admiral
- Commands: USS Richmond; USS Yankee; USS Pocahontas; USS Pawnee; USS Sonoma; USS Wachusett; USS Santiago de Cuba; USS Colorado; USS Ticonderoga; North Atlantic Squadron
- Conflicts: Mexican–American War; American Civil War

Robert Harris Wyman (12 July 1822 – 2 December 1882) was a rear admiral in the U.S. Navy.

== Early career ==
Robert Harris Wyman was born at Portsmouth, New Hampshire. He was appointed midshipman on 11 March 1837 and served initially in the razee Independence on the Brazil station. After sea duty in the sloops-of-war Fairfield and John Adams—the latter commanded by his father—he was appointed passed midshipman in 1843.

== Service in the Mexican–American War ==
Over the next three years, Wyman served in South American waters in the schooner Onkahye, the brig Perry, and the frigate Brandywine before participating in the Mexican–American War in Commodore Conner's Home Squadron—first in the steamer Princeton and later in the brig Porpoise and the sloop Albany. During that time, he took part in the expeditions against Tampico during November 1846 and Veracruz in March 1847.

Passed Midshipman, Wyman spent a tour of duty ashore at the Naval Observatory, Washington, D.C., before reporting to the receiving ship Franklin at Boston, Massachusetts, and subsequently being promoted to lieutenant on 16 July 1850. Over the next decade, he served at sea; and the outbreak of the Civil War in April 1861 found him in command of Richmond on the Mediterranean Station.

== Service in the American Civil War ==
Early in July, soon after he brought that steam sloop-of-war home for wartime duty, he took command of Yankee. In September, Wyman assumed command of Pocahontas. That ship, as part of the Potomac River Flotilla, helped to keep open the Union's vital waterway communications with Washington, D.C., while cutting off Southern forces from their sympathizers in southern Maryland.

Commanding the steamer Pawnee from October 1861, Wyman took part in Flag Officer DuPont's capture of the key seaport of Port Royal, South Carolina. After that operation, Wyman returned north and took command of the Potomac River Flotilla on 6 December 1861. He held this important post until the end of June 1862. During his time in the Potomac, he was active in maintaining Union control of that vital river and of much of the Rappahannock during General McClellan's Peninsular Campaign. His ships destroyed Southern bridges, captured nine Confederate ships, and burned 40 schooners.

Promoted to commander on 16 July 1862, Wyman was ordered to command the gunboat Sonoma on the James River. Transferred to the West Indian Squadron the following October, he commanded the steam sloop Wachusett and the paddle steamer Santiago de Cuba, and captured the blockade runners Britannia and Lizzie. During the last two years of the Civil War, Wyman served on special duty in the Navy Department in Washington, D.C.

== Later career ==
After the Civil War, Wyman commanded Colorado, the flagship for the European Squadron. He was promoted to captain on 25 July 1866, and took command of the steam sloop Ticonderoga the following year.

After that tour of sea duty, Wyman headed the Navy's Hydrographic Office for eight years, receiving promotions to commodore on 19 July 1872, and to rear admiral on 26 April 1878. His leadership of the Hydrographic Office proved to be of great importance to the Navy and seafaring men in general. Through the Civil War, the United States Navy had relied upon foreign sources—principally British—for their navigational charts, doing little of their own hydrographic work. Under Wyman's direction, the office began a systematic and sustained program of worldwide charting and surveying, the precursor of the navy's present globe-girdling oceanographic research effort.

Wyman was given command of the North Atlantic Squadron in January 1879, leaving in on 25 May 1882, to become a member (and later chairman) of the Lighthouse Board.

Rear Admiral Wyman suffered at paralytic seizure on 1 December 1882. He died at his home in Washington, D.C., on 2 December. He was interred at Oak Hill Cemetery in Washington, D.C., on 4 December.

== Namesake ==
The United States Navy ship USNS Wyman (T-AGS-34), launched on 30 October 1969, was named in his honor.

== See also ==
Military offices
Preceded by John C. Howell	Commander-in-Chief, North Atlantic Squadron; January 1879 – 1 May 1882	Succeeded by George H. Cooper
