= USS San Francisco (C-5) =

US Navy protected cruiser

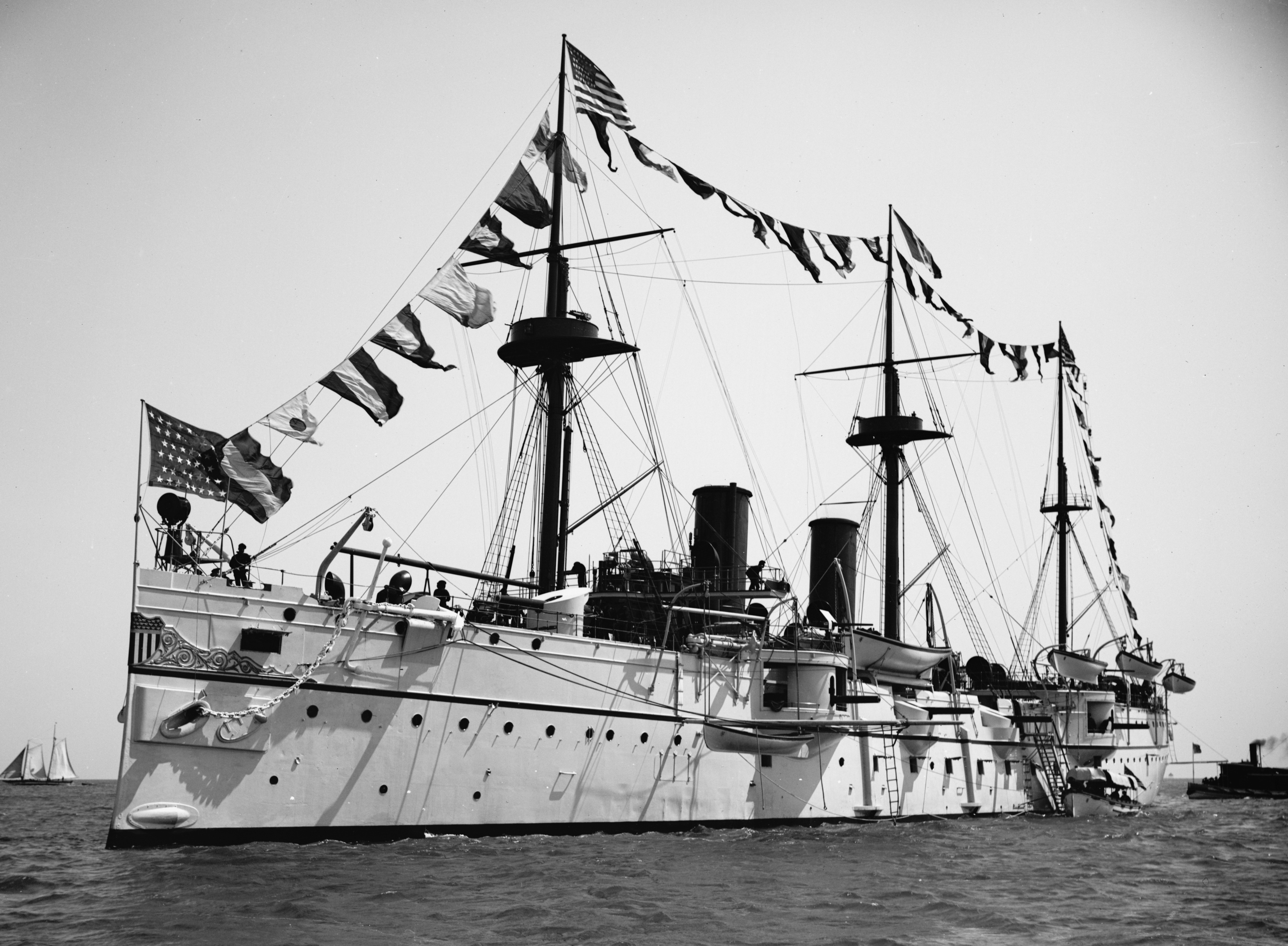
- USS San Francisco (C-5) dressed overall.

History

United States
- Name: San Francisco (1887–1930); Tahoe (1930–1931); Yosemite (1931–1937)
- Namesake: San Francisco; Tahoe; Yosemite
- Ordered: 3 March 1887
- Awarded: 26 October 1887
- Builder: Union Iron Works, San Francisco, California
- Cost: $1,428,000 (contract price for hull and machinery)
- Laid down: 14 August 1888
- Launched: 26 October 1889
- Sponsored by: Miss Edith W. Benham
- Commissioned: 15 November 1890
- Decommissioned: 25 October 1898
- Recommissioned: 2 January 1902
- Decommissioned: 31 December 1904
- Refit: Mine planter, June 1908
- Recommissioned: 29 November 1911
- Decommissioned: 6 June 1916
- Reclassified: mine planter 19 December 1912
- Recommissioned: 16 October 1916
- Decommissioned: 24 December 1921
- Renamed: Tahoe, after 1921; Yosemite, 1 January 1931
- Reclassified: Cruiser Minelayer (CM-2), 17 July 1920
- Stricken: 8 June 1937
- Identification: Hull symbol: C-5; Hull symbol: CM-2
- Fate: Sold for scrapping 20 April 1939

General characteristics (as built)
- Type: Protected cruiser
- Displacement: 4,088 long tons (4,154 t) (standard); 4,583 long tons (4,657 t) (full load)
- Length: 324 ft 6 in (98.91 m) oa; 310 ft (94 m) pp
- Beam: 49 ft 2 in (14.99 m)
- Draft: 18 ft 9 in (5.72 m) (mean draft); 22 ft 4 in (6.81 m) (max draft)
- Installed power: 4 × steam boilers; 2 × horizontal triple expansion reciprocating steam engines; 10,500 ihp (7,800 kW)
- Propulsion: 2 × screws
- Sail plan: Schooner (as built)
- Speed: 19 kn (35 km/h; 22 mph)
- Range: 3,432 nmi (6,356 km; 3,949 mi) at 10 kn (19 km/h; 12 mph)
- Complement: 34 officers and 350 enlisted men
- Armament: 12 × 6 inch (152 mm)/30 caliber Mark 3 breech-loading rifles; 4 × 57 mm (2.2 in) 6-pounder guns; 4 × 47 mm (1.9 in) 3-pounder guns; 2 × 37 mm (1.5 in) 1-pounder rapid firing guns; 4 × Gatling guns
- Armor: Gun shields: 2 in (51 mm); Water-Tight Deck: 3 in (76 mm) (slope); 2 in (51 mm) (flat); Conning Tower: 3 in (76 mm)

General characteristics (1914)
- Type: Mine planter
- Installed power: 8 × Babcock & Wilcox boilers; 9,761 shp (7,279 kW) (ihp on trials)
- Complement: 32 officers 271 enlisted men
- Armament: 8 × 5 inch (127 mm)/40 caliber guns; 4 × 6-pounder 57 mm (2.2 in) guns; 300 Mark II naval mines

General characteristics (1921)
- Type: Minelayer
- Complement: 52 officers 351 enlisted men
- Armament: 4 × 5 inch (127 mm)/51 caliber guns; 4 × 57 mm (2.2 in) 6-pounder rapid firing guns; 2 × 3 in (76 mm)/50 caliber guns anti-aircraft; 2 × machine guns; 300 Mark II naval mines

The first USS San Francisco (C-5) (later CM-2) was a steel protected cruiser in the United States Navy. She was later named Tahoe and then Yosemite, becoming the third US Navy ship to bear the name Yosemite. She generally resembled her predecessor Newark, with a main armament of twelve 6-inch guns.

San Francisco was launched on 26 October 1889, at the Union Iron Works, San Francisco, California; sponsored by Miss Edith W. Benham; and commissioned on 15 November 1890, Captain William T. Sampson in command.

== Design and construction ==
San Francisco was built to Navy Department plans, with twelve 6 inch (152 mm)/30 caliber guns. Two guns each were on the bow and stern, with the remainder in sponsons along the sides. Secondary armament was four 6-pounder (57 mm (2.2 in)) guns, four 3-pounder (47 mm (1.85 in)) Hotchkiss revolving cannon, two 1-pounder (37 mm (1.5 in)) Hotchkiss revolving cannon, and two .45 caliber (11.4 mm) Gatling guns. Some of the weapons listed as Hotchkiss revolving cannon may actually have been rapid-firing guns.

San Francisco had 2 in (51 mm) gun shields and a 3 in (76 mm) conning tower. The armored deck was up to 3 in (76 mm) thick on the sloped sides and 2 in (51 mm) thick in the middle.

The as-built engineering plant included four coal-fired double-ended cylindrical boilers, which supplied 135 psi (930 kPa) steam to two horizontal triple expansion engines totaling 10,500 ihp (7,800 kW) (designed) for a designed speed of 19 knots (35 km/h; 22 mph). This speed was attained on trials but the trial horsepower was only 9,912 ihp (7,391 kW). San Francisco was the last US Navy cruiser fitted with sails, which were soon removed. She carried 350 tons of coal for a designed range of 3,432 nmi (6,356 km; 3,949 mi) at 10 kn (19 km/h; 12 mph); this could be increased to 850 tons for 8,333 nmi (15,433 km; 9,589 mi).

=== Refits ===
One reference states that four 18 inch (450 mm) (457 mm) torpedo tubes were added in 1894. The ship's 6-inch guns were converted to rapid-firing in 1902 and the torpedo tubes were removed at this time. In 1908–1911 San Francisco was converted to a minelayer, with all guns except the four 6-pounder (57 mm) weapons replaced by eight 5 inch (127 mm)/40 caliber guns and storage for 300 mines added. She was also reboilered with eight Babcock & Wilcox boilers. By 1918 her gun armament was further modernized with four 5 inch (127 mm)/51 caliber guns, four 6-pounder (57 mm) guns, two 3 inch (76 mm)/50 caliber anti-aircraft guns, and two machine guns (possibly the .30 caliber M1895 Colt–Browning machine gun).

== Service history ==
=== Pre-Spanish–American War ===
Assigned to the South Pacific Squadron, San Francisco moved south and became the squadron's flagship on 31 March 1891. Five months later, as an eight-month-old civil war drew to a close in Chile, she landed a force of sailors and Marines to protect the United States Consulate. September brought an end to the war, and San Francisco resumed her cruising off the South American coast. With the new year, 1892, she sailed north and west and arrived at Honolulu on 27 February as political differences deepened between monarchists and republicans. She departed Hawaii in August 1892, en route to Norfolk, Virginia, where she arrived in February 1893.

San Francisco became the flagship of the North Atlantic Squadron on 31 May and cruised off the New England coast into the fall. In November, she sailed south, visited ports in the Caribbean; and, in late December, reached Rio de Janeiro and assumed flagship duties for the South Atlantic Squadron. She called at ports in Brazil, the Netherlands West Indies, Colombia, Costa Rica, and Nicaragua during the next six months, then returned to the United States, anchoring at New York City on 29 July 1894.

=== Spanish–American War ===
The year 1895 brought further overseas duty; and, in January, San Francisco crossed the Atlantic to cruise in the eastern Mediterranean Sea as political tension within the Ottoman Empire caused diplomatic uneasiness. Later shifted to other areas, she remained in European waters, serving as the flagship of Commodore Thomas O. Selfridge Jr., commander of the European Squadron, until 1896. In March of that year, she returned to the U.S.; cruised off the east coast until the outbreak of war against Spain in April 1898; then took up patrol duties along the Florida coast and off Cuba. In July, Spain requested terms; and, in August, she returned to Hampton Roads. She was placed out of commission at the Norfolk Navy Yard on 25 October.

=== Pre-World War I ===
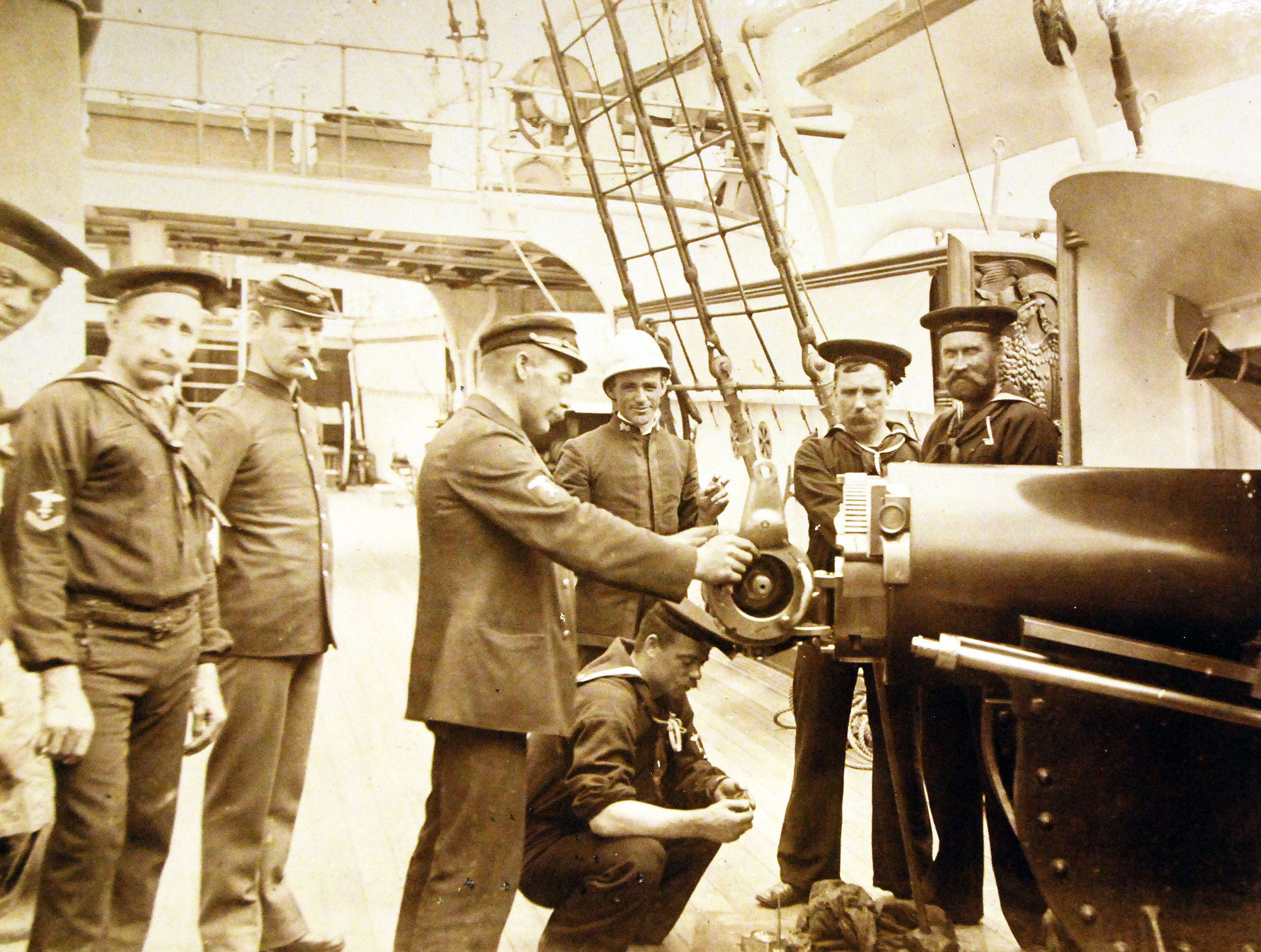
Cleaning a 6" gun on San Francisco

Recommissioned on 2 January 1902, San Francisco was again assigned to the European Squadron. In September, she returned to the U.S. and commenced operations southward into the Caribbean. Another cruise to the Mediterranean, thence on to Asiatic ports, followed; and, in the fall of 1904, the protected cruiser again entered the Norfolk Navy Yard, where she was decommissioned on 31 December.

In June 1908, San Francisco was ordered refitted as a minelaying vessel; and in 1910, she was rearmed with eight 5 inch (127 mm)/40 caliber guns and a capacity of 300 mines. On 21 August 1911, she was recommissioned but retained in reserve; and, after participation in the Fleet Review at New York, she was placed in full commission on 29 November.

Designated a mine planter on 19 December 1912, she remained based at Norfolk and operated in the western Atlantic and the Caribbean into 1916, when she was again ordered inactivated. In 1914, she took part in the United States occupation of Veracruz. She was placed in reserve at Portsmouth, New Hampshire on 6 June 1916, but resumed full commissioned status again on 18 October.

=== World War I ===
With the April 1917 entry of the United States into World War I, San Francisco began laying anti-submarine nets in the Hampton Roads area. In June, she shifted to New York, where she conducted experimental deep water minelaying operations; and, during August, she underwent overhaul at the Portsmouth Navy Yard. In mid-September, she moved back down the coast to New London, Connecticut where she provided net laying services until ordered to Norfolk for training duty later in the fall. From December 1917-March 1918, she underwent an extensive overhaul; and, in April, she became flagship of Mine Squadron 1.

In early May, the squadron assembled at Newport, Rhode Island. On the 12th, the ships sailed for England. On the 26th, units of the Royal Navy escorted the ships into Inverness. San Francisco joined the Allied effort of creating the North Sea Mine Barrage across the North Sea to restrict German U-boat traffic into the Atlantic. San Francisco laid a total of 9,102 mines:

- planting 153 mines during the 1st minelaying excursion on 7 June,
- planting 170 mines during the 3rd minelaying excursion on 14 July,
- planting 170 mines during the 4th minelaying excursion on 29 July,
- planting 170 mines during the 5th minelaying excursion on 8 August,
- planting 166 mines on 12 August to field test sensitivity settings for the antenna fuze detonating relay of the Mk 6 mines,
- planting 160 mines during the 6th minelaying excursion on 18 August,
- planting 170 mines during the 7th minelaying excursion on 26 August,
- planting 170 mines during the 8th minelaying excursion on 7 September,
- planting 170 mines during the 9th minelaying excursion on 20 September,
- planting 170 mines during the 10th minelaying excursion on 27 September,
- planting 170 mines during the 11th minelaying excursion on 4 October,
- planting 170 mines during the 12th minelaying excursion on 13 October, and
- planting 170 mines during the final 13th minelaying excursion on 24 October.

=== Inter-war period ===
San Francisco conducted minelaying operations until the Armistice on 11 November. Minesweepers then moved in, and she prepared to return home. She departed Inverness on 2 December and arrived in Hampton Roads on 3 January 1919. Overhaul followed, after which she cruised in the western Atlantic and Caribbean through 1921. Designated CM-2 (cruiser minelayer) on 17 July 1920, she was ordered inactivated in 1921; and on 6 October, she arrived at Philadelphia where she was decommissioned on 24 December 1921.

Remaining in reserve through the decade, CM-2 was renamed Tahoe, and then Yosemite, effective 1 January 1931, to allow the name San Francisco to be given to CA-38, then under construction. As Yosemite, she remained at Philadelphia for another eight years. Her name was struck from the Naval Vessel Register on 8 June 1937, but she was retained at the Navy Yard until sold for scrapping to the Union Shipbuilding Company, Baltimore, Maryland on 20 April 1939.

== Awards ==
- Navy Expeditionary Medal
- Spanish Campaign Medal
- Mexican Service Medal
- Victory Medal with "Minelayer" clasp

== Bibliography ==
- Bauer, K. Jack; Roberts, Stephen S. (1991). Register of Ships of the U.S. Navy, 1775–1990: Major Combatants. Westport, Connecticut: Greenwood Press. ISBN 0-313-26202-0.
- Belknap, Reginald Rowan. The Yankee Mining Squadron; or, Laying the North Sea Mining Barrage (1920) Annapolis: United States Naval Institute
- Burr, Lawrence. US Cruisers 1883–1904: The Birth of the Steel Navy. Oxford : Osprey, 2008. ISBN 1-84603-267-9 OCLC 488657946
- Friedman, Norman (1984). U.S. Cruisers: An Illustrated Design History. Annapolis, Maryland: Naval Institute Press. ISBN 0-87021-718-6.
- Gardiner, Robert; Chesneau, Roger (1979). Conway's All the World's Fighting Ships 1860–1905. New York: Mayflower Books. ISBN 0-8317-0302-4.
- Jane's Fighting Ships of World War I. London: Random House Group, Ltd. 2001. ISBN 1-85170-378-0.
- Warship International Staff (2015). "International Fleet Review at the Opening of the Kiel Canal, 20 June 1895". Warship International. LII (3): 255–263. ISSN 0043-0374.
