= USS Mullany =

USS Mullany may refer to the following ships of the United States Navy:

- USS Mullany (DD-325), a Clemson-class destroyer launched in 1920 and struck in 1930
- USS Mullany (DD-528), a Fletcher-class destroyer launched in 1942 and stricken in 1971; transferred to the Republic of China as Chiang Yang; struck 1999

== See also ==
- USS Beatty (DD-640), a Gleaves-class destroyer originally laid down as Mullany in 1941
