= USS Mullany (DD-325) =

Clemson-class destroyer

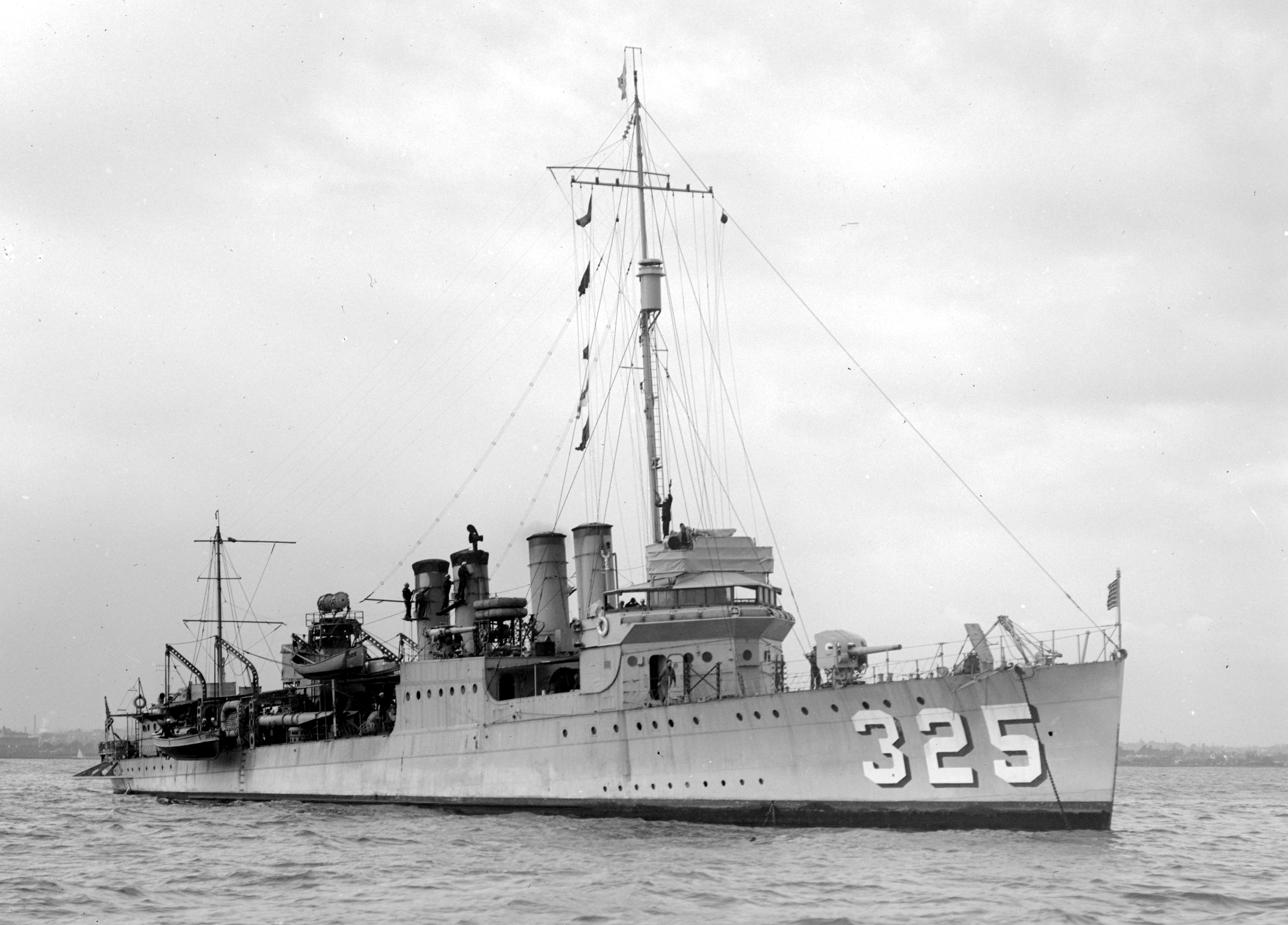
- USS Mullany in 1925

History

United States
- Namesake: James Robert Madison Mullany
- Builder: Bethlehem Shipbuilding Corporation, Union Iron Works, San Francisco
- Laid down: 3 June 1919
- Launched: 9 July 1920
- Commissioned: 29 March 1921
- Decommissioned: 1 May 1930
- Stricken: 18 November 1930
- Fate: Sold for scrapping, 19 March 1931

General characteristics
- Class & type: Clemson-class destroyer
- Displacement: 1,290 long tons (1,311 t) (standard); 1,389 long tons (1,411 t) (deep load)
- Length: 314 ft 4 in (95.8 m)
- Beam: 30 ft 11 in (9.42 m)
- Draught: 10 ft 3 in (3.1 m)
- Installed power: 27,000 shp (20,000 kW); 4 water-tube boilers
- Propulsion: 2 shafts, 2 steam turbines
- Speed: 35 knots (65 km/h; 40 mph) (design)
- Range: 2,500 nautical miles (4,600 km; 2,900 mi) at 20 knots (37 km/h; 23 mph) (design)
- Complement: 6 officers, 108 enlisted men
- Armament: 4 × single 4-inch (102 mm) guns; 2 × single 1-pounder AA guns or; 2 × single 3-inch (76 mm) guns; 4 × triple 21 inch (533 mm) torpedo tubes; 2 × depth charge rails

USS Mullany (DD-325) was a Clemson-class destroyer built for the United States Navy during World War I.

== Description ==
The Clemson class was a repeat of the preceding Wickes class although more fuel capacity was added. The ships displaced 1,290 long tons (1,311 t) at standard load and 1,389 long tons (1,411 t) at deep load. They had an overall length of 314 feet 4 inches (95.8 m), a beam of 30 feet 11 inches (9.4 m) and a draught of 10 feet 3 inches (3.1 m). They had a crew of 6 officers and 108 enlisted men.

Performance differed radically between the ships of the class, often due to poor workmanship. The Clemson class was powered by two steam turbines, each driving one propeller shaft, using steam provided by four water-tube boilers. The turbines were designed to produce a total of 27,000 shaft horsepower (20,000 kW) intended to reach a speed of 35 knots (65 km/h; 40 mph). The ships carried a maximum of 371 long tons (377 t) of fuel oil which was intended gave them a range of 2,500 nautical miles (4,600 km; 2,900 mi) at 20 knots (37 km/h; 23 mph).

The ships were armed with four 4-inch (102 mm) guns in single mounts and were fitted with two 1-pounder guns for anti-aircraft defense. In many ships a shortage of 1-pounders caused them to be replaced by 3-inch (76 mm) guns. Their primary weapon, though, was their torpedo battery of a dozen 21 inch (533 mm) torpedo tubes in four triple mounts. They also carried a pair of depth charge rails. A "Y-gun" depth charge thrower was added to many ships.

== Construction and career ==
Mullany named for James Robert Madison Mullany, was laid down 3 June 1919 by Bethlehem Shipbuilding Corporation, San Francisco, California; launched 9 July 1920; sponsored by Miss Alice Lee Hall; and commissioned at Mare Island Navy Yard 29 March 1921. Based at San Diego, California, Mullany operated along the west coast through most of her career, sailing annually to the Panama Canal Zone and the Caribbean for combined fleet maneuvers. She left San Francisco, California 15 April 1925 for fleet tactics in Hawaiian waters, from which she sailed 1 July with the battle fleet on a good will cruise via Samoa to Australia and New Zealand. Mullany returned to San Diego 27 September. In 1928, she twice cruised to Hawaii, first for fleet maneuvers, and later training naval reservists. She decommissioned 1 May 1930 at San Diego. Her name was struck from the Navy list 18 November 1930 and she was sold for scrapping 19 March 1931.
