= Thomas Kane (Medal of Honor) =

- Born: c. 1841; Jersey City, New Jersey
- Died: Unknown date of death
- Military career
- Allegiance: United States of America; Union
- Branch: United States Navy; Union Navy
- Rank: Captain of the Hold
- Unit: USS Nereus (1863)
- Conflicts: American Civil War Second Battle of Fort Fisher
- Awards: Medal of Honor

Thomas Kane (c. 1841 – unknown date of death) was a sailor in the U.S. Navy during the American Civil War. He received the Medal of Honor for his actions during the Second Battle of Fort Fisher on January 15, 1865.

== Military service ==
Kane enlisted in the Navy from New Jersey in 1856, and was assigned to the Union steamer USS Nereus (1863).

On January 15, 1865, the North Carolina Confederate stronghold of Fort Fisher was taken by a combined Union storming party of sailors, marines, and soldiers under the command of Admiral David Dixon Porter and General Alfred Terry.

== Medal of Honor citation ==
The President of the United States of America, in the name of Congress, takes pleasure in presenting the Medal of Honor to Captain of the Hold Thomas Kane, United States Navy, for extraordinary heroism in action while serving on board the U.S.S. Nereus during the attack on Fort Fisher, North Carolina, on 15 January 1865. Thomas Kane, as Captain of the Hold, displayed outstanding skill and courage as his ship maintained its well-directed fire against fortifications on shore despite the enemy's return fire. When a rebel steamer was discovered in the river back of the fort, the Nereus, with forward rifle guns trained, drove the ship off at the third fire. The gallant ship's participation contributed to the planting of the flag on one of the strongest fortifications possessed by the rebels.

General Orders: War Department, General Orders No. 584(October 3, 1867)

Action Date: January 15, 1865

Service: Navy

Rank: Captain of the Hold

Division: U.S.S. Nereus

== See also ==
- List of Medal of Honor recipients
- List of American Civil War Medal of Honor recipients: G–L
