= John Cummings Howell =

American Navy admiral (1819–1892)

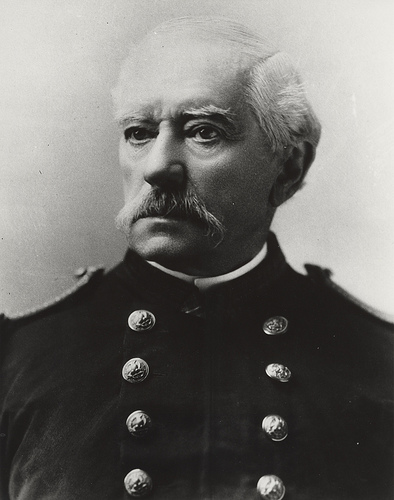
- Born: November 24, 1819; Philadelphia, Pennsylvania, US
- Died: September 12, 1892 (aged 72); Folkestone, England
- Burial place: Cheriton Road Cemetery, Folkestone, England
- Military career
- Allegiance: United States
- Branch: United States Navy
- Service years: 1836–1881
- Rank: Rear Admiral
- Commands: USS Tahoma; USS Nereus; Naval Rendezvous Philadelphia; League Island Navy Yard; Portsmouth Navy Yard; North Atlantic Squadron; European Squadron
- Conflicts: American Civil War Union blockade Battle of Hatteras Inlet Batteries First Battle of Fort Fisher Second Battle of Fort Fisher

John Cummings Howell (November 24, 1819 – September 12, 1892) was an officer in the United States Navy during the American Civil War. He rose to the rank of rear admiral and late in his career was commander-in-chief of the North Atlantic Squadron and then of the European Squadron.

== Early life ==
Howell was born in Philadelphia, Pennsylvania, on November 24, 1819.

== Naval career ==
=== Early career ===
Howell was appointed as a midshipman on June 9, 1836. His first tour of duty was aboard the new sloop-of-war USS Levant in the West Indies Squadron from 1837 to 1841. He was promoted to passed midshipman on July 1, 1842, and served aboard the new frigate USS Congress in the Mediterranean Squadron from 1842 to 1844. From 1844 to 1845 he served aboard the brig USS Perry in the East India Squadron, after which he was Naval Storekeeper at Macao from 1846 to 1848.

Promoted to master on February 21, 1849 and to lieutenant on August 2, 1849, Howell returned to sea for a tour aboard the frigate USS Raritan in the Home Squadron from 1849 to 1850. He next served aboard the sloop-of-war USS Saratoga in the East India Squadron from 1851 to 1853. A tour aboard the receiving ship at Philadelphia followed from 1854 to 1856, after which he returned to the Mediterranean Squadron to serve aboard the steam frigate USS Susquehanna from 1856 to 1858. Then he had a second tour aboard the receiving ship at Philadelphia – which by then was USS Princeton – from 1859 to 1860.

=== American Civil War ===
The American Civil War broke out in April 1861, and that year Howell reported aboard the steam frigate USS Minnesota, which was assigned to the North Atlantic Blockading Squadron to take part in the Union blockade of the Confederate States of America. While aboard Minnesota he saw action in the Battle of Hatteras Inlet Batteries on the Outer Banks of North Carolina on August 28–29, 1861.

Howell detached from Minnesota later in 1861 to become the first commanding officer of the new gunboat USS Tahoma, which was commissioned on December 20, 1861, and assigned to the East Gulf Blockading Squadron, with which she remained throughout her career. Under his command, Tahoma enjoyed many successes. On April 26, 1862, she chased a Confederate schooner until it ran aground, then destroyed it. In June 1862, she raided St. Mark's, Florida, where she burned a barracks and destroyed a battery of Confederate artillery. Off Mexico's Yucatán Peninsula, she captured the blockade runner Uncle Mose, a schooner carrying 115 bales of cotton, after Uncle Mose mistakenly sailed up to her on July 7, 1862. Nine days later, Howell was promoted to commander on July 16, 1862.

Tahoma joined the gunboat USS Somerset in putting 111 men ashore in eight boats at Seahorse Key to destroy three Confederate salt works on October 6, 1862. She went on to capture the sloop Silas Henry, which was running the blockade with a cargo of cotton, at Tampa Bay, Florida, on January 8, 1863; the British schooner Margaret off St, Petersburg, Florida, on February 1, 1863; and the yacht Stonewall off Pea Creek, Florida, on February 22, 1863. She exchanged fire with a Confederate shore battery at Gadsden's Point, Florida, on April 2, 1863, and then returned to her pursuit of blockade runners, capturing the schooner Crazy Jane, carrying a cargo of cotton and turpentine, near Gadsden's point on May 5, 1863, and the schooner Statesman and her cargo of cotton in Tampa Bay on June 6, 1863. On June 18, she both captured the British schooner Harrietton off Anclote Key and destroyed the blockade runner Mary Jane at Clearwater, Florida. On October 17, 1863, she joined the gunboat USS Adela in landing an expeditionary force at Tampa, Florida, and burned the steamer Scottish Chief and the sloop Kate Dale. Howell detached from Tahoma later in 1863.

Howell's next tour was as the first commanding officer of the schooner-rigged steamer USS Nereus, which was commissioned on April 19, 1864, and assigned to the North Atlantic Blockading Squadron. Under his command, Nereus escorted the steamer SS North Star from New York City to Aspinwall, Colombia, on the Isthmus of Panama, and the monitor USS Dictator on a voyage from New York City to Hampton Roads, Virginia; towed the monitor USS Saugus from Norfolk, Virginia, to Wilmington, North Carolina, for operations against Confederate Fort Fisher; and took part in the First Battle of Fort Fisher of December 23–27, 1864 and the Second Battle of Fort Fisher of January 13–15, 1865. She then towed the monitor USS Mahopac from Wilmington to Charleston, South Carolina, for operations against the Confederate defenses of Charleston Harbor. Howell and Nereus ended the war searching the Bahamas and the Caribbean for the Confederate States Navy commerce raider CSS Shenandoah.

=== Post-Civil War ===
Promoted to captain on July 25, 1866, Howell's first post-war tour was as commanding officer of the Naval Rendezvous at Philadelphia from 1866 to 1868. He returned to sea in 1869 as a member of the staff of the European Squadron, serving as the squadron's fleet captain from 1869 to 1870 and as chief of staff to its commander-in-chief, Rear Admiral Charles S. Boggs, in 1871. He commanded League Island Navy Yard in Philadelphia from 1871 to 1872. Promoted to commodore on January 29, 1872, he commanded the Portsmouth Navy Yard in Kittery, Maine, from 1872 to 1874 and was the chief of the U.S. Navy's Bureau of Yards and Docks from September 22, 1874 to 1878. He was promoted to rear admiral during this tour on April 25, 1877.

In September 1878, Howell became commander-in-chief of the North Atlantic Squadron, with the steam frigate USS Powhatan as his flagship. The squadron was considered the most prestigious seagoing command in the U.S. Navy at the time, but the Navy had shrunk so dramatically since the conclusion of the Civil War in April 1865 that the squadron consisted of only two ships, Powhatan and the screw sloop-of-war USS Plymouth, during his tenure as its commander-in-chief. When an insurrection broke out on the Caribbean island of Santa Cruz in the Danish Virgin Islands (now St. Croix in the United States Virgin Islands), the United States Department of the Navy ordered Howell to intervene with his squadron. Unfortunately, Powhatan was in Postmouth, New Hampshire, and too far away from Santa Cruz to influence events there, and Plymouth was not provisioned and unable to get underway. A French Navy warship got to Santa Cruz first, landed troops, and quelled the rioting there, but not before the rioters had burned the American consulate. Despite the limited means at Howell's disposal – a squadron consisting of only two ships with which to carry out the responsibility for all U.S. Navy operations off eastern Canada, along the entire United States East Coast and United States Gulf Coast, and in the entire Gulf of Mexico and Caribbean Sea – the Department of the Navy reprimanded him for having neither of his ships ready to deploy to Santa Cruz on short notice and in a timely manner.

In January 1879, Howell turned command of the North Atlantic Squadron over to Rear Admiral Robert H. Wyman. He became commander-in-chief of the European Squadron in February 1879, serving in that capacity until relieved by Rear Admiral James W. Nicholson on September 16, 1881. He retired from the Navy upon reaching the statutory retirement age of 62 on November 24, 1881.

== Death ==
Howell died at Folkestone, Kent, England, on September 12, 1892. He is buried at Cheriton Road Cemetery in Folkestone.

== Sources ==
- Hamersly, Lewis Randolph. The Records of Living Officers of the U.S. Navy and Marine Corps, Fourth Edition. Philadelphia: L. R. Hamersly & Co., 1890.
- Rentfrow, James C. Home Squadron: The U.S. Navy on the North Atlantic Station. Annapolis, Maryland: Naval Institute Press, 2014. ISBN 978-1-61251-447-5.

Military offices
Preceded by Stephen D. Trenchard	Commander-in-Chief, North Atlantic Squadron; September 1878–January 1879	Succeeded by Robert H. Wyman
Preceded by William E. Le Roy	Commander-in-Chief, European Squadron; February 1879–16 September 1881	Succeeded by James W. Nicholson
