= James Robert Madison Mullany =

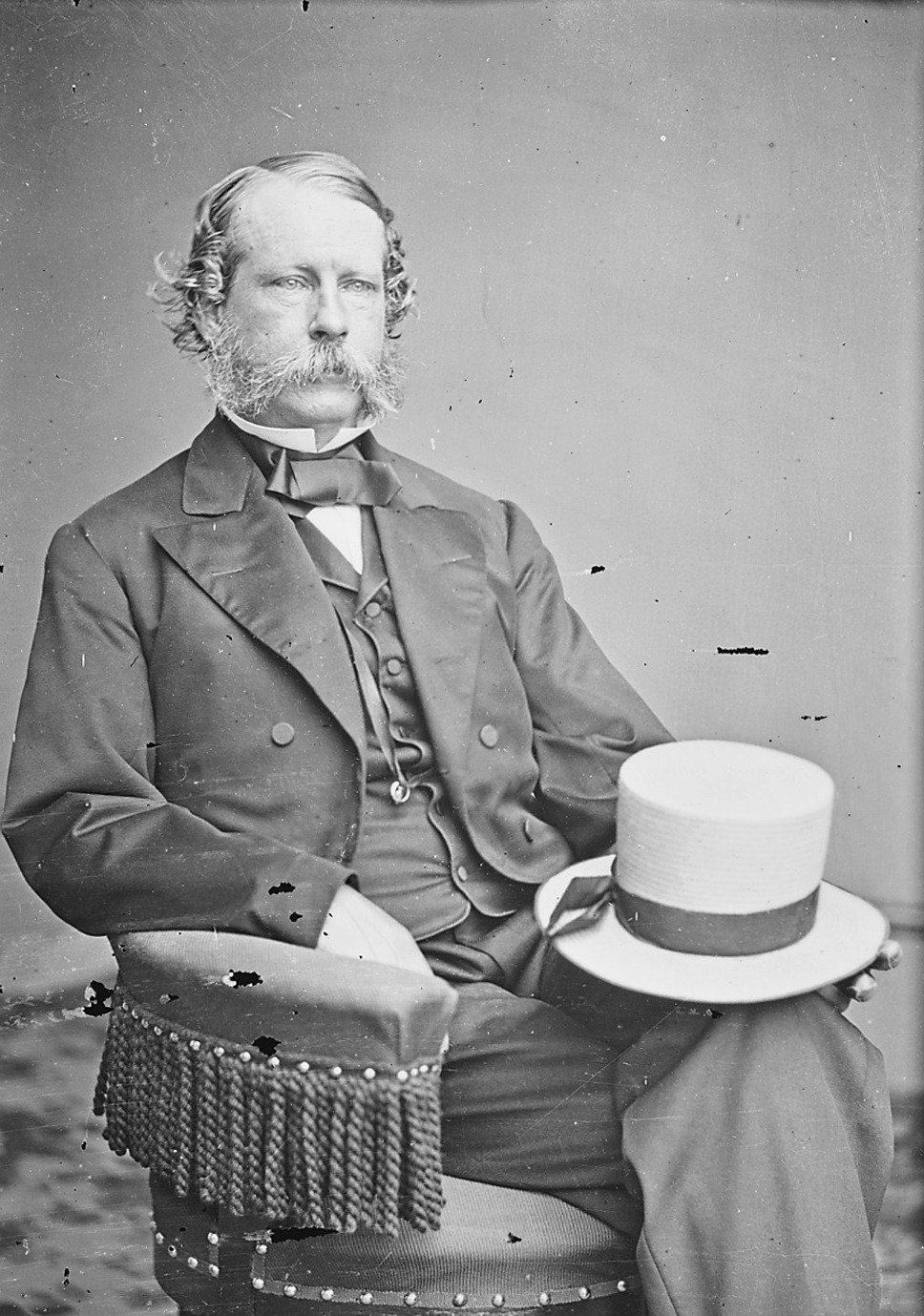
- Born: October 26, 1818; New York City
- Died: September 17, 1887 (aged 68); Bryn Mawr, Pennsylvania
- Military career
- Allegiance: United States of America
- Branch: United States Navy
- Service years: 1832–1879
- Rank: Rear Admiral
- Commands: USS Wyandotte; USS Bienville; USS Oneida; USS Richmond; Mediterranean Squadron; North Atlantic Squadron
- Conflicts: Mexican–American War; American Civil War

James Robert Madison Mullany (26 October 1818 – 17 September 1887) was a rear admiral of the United States Navy, who served during the American Civil War.

== Biography ==
Mullany was the son of Colonel James R. Mullany and Maria Burger. Colonel Mullany, born in Ireland, had served in the War of 1812, and was Quartermaster General of the United States Army from 1816 until 1818.

His son, James Robert Madison Mullany, was born in New York City, and entered the navy as a midshipman from New Jersey on 7 January 1832. He was promoted to passed midshipman on 23 June 1838, and to lieutenant on 29 February 1844. During the Mexican–American War he took part in the capture of the city of Tabasco, Mexico, in June 1847.

From January till March 1861, he served on the sailing frigate Sabine in the protection of Fort Pickens on Santa Rosa Island, Florida, and in April and May of that year, in command of the steam gunboat Wyandotte defended the fort from attacks from the Confederate Army, assisting in reinforcing the fort on 12 April 1861.

Mullany was promoted to commander on 18 October 1861, and assigned to the side-wheel steamer Bienville in the North Atlantic and West Gulf Blockading Squadrons in April 1862. From April till September 1863, he commanded a division of the West Gulf Squadron, and during the war captured eleven blockade-runners, and cut out two schooners laden with cotton in the harbor of Galveston, Texas.

In August 1864 Mullany commanded the screw sloop Oneida during the Battle of Mobile Bay, the Bienville being considered unfit to engage the forts by Admiral David Farragut. The Oneida, lashed to the ironclad screw steamer Galena was in the rear of the line of battle, and exposed to a very destructive fire from Fort Morgan. Later the Oneida was attacked and raked by the Confederate ram Tennessee, and Mullany received several wounds, necessitating the amputation of his left arm.

From May 1865 until May 1868, Mullany was inspector in charge of ordnance in the Brooklyn Navy Yard. He was promoted to captain in 1866, and was one of the Board of Visitors to the Naval Academy in 1868. He commanded the steam sloop Richmond in the European Squadron from December 1868 until November 1871.

He was commissioned as commodore on 15 August 1870, and was in charge of the Mediterranean Squadron from October 1870 until November 1871, and of the Philadelphia Navy Yard in 1872–74. After receiving his rear admiral's commission on 5 June 1874, he commanded the North Atlantic Squadron until February 1876, protecting American interests on the Isthmus of Panama.

He served as the governor of the Philadelphia Naval Asylum from 1876 until 1879, when he retired from active service.

Mullany died in Bryn Mawr, Montgomery County, Pennsylvania, on 17 September 1887. He was buried at The Woodlands Cemetery in Philadelphia.

== Namesakes ==
Two destroyers have been named USS Mullany in his honor.

== Notes ==
Military offices
Preceded by Gustavus H. Scott	Commander-in-Chief, North Atlantic Squadron; 13 June 1874–January 1876	Succeeded by William E. Le Roy
