= USS Nereus (1863) =

Gunboat of the United States Navy

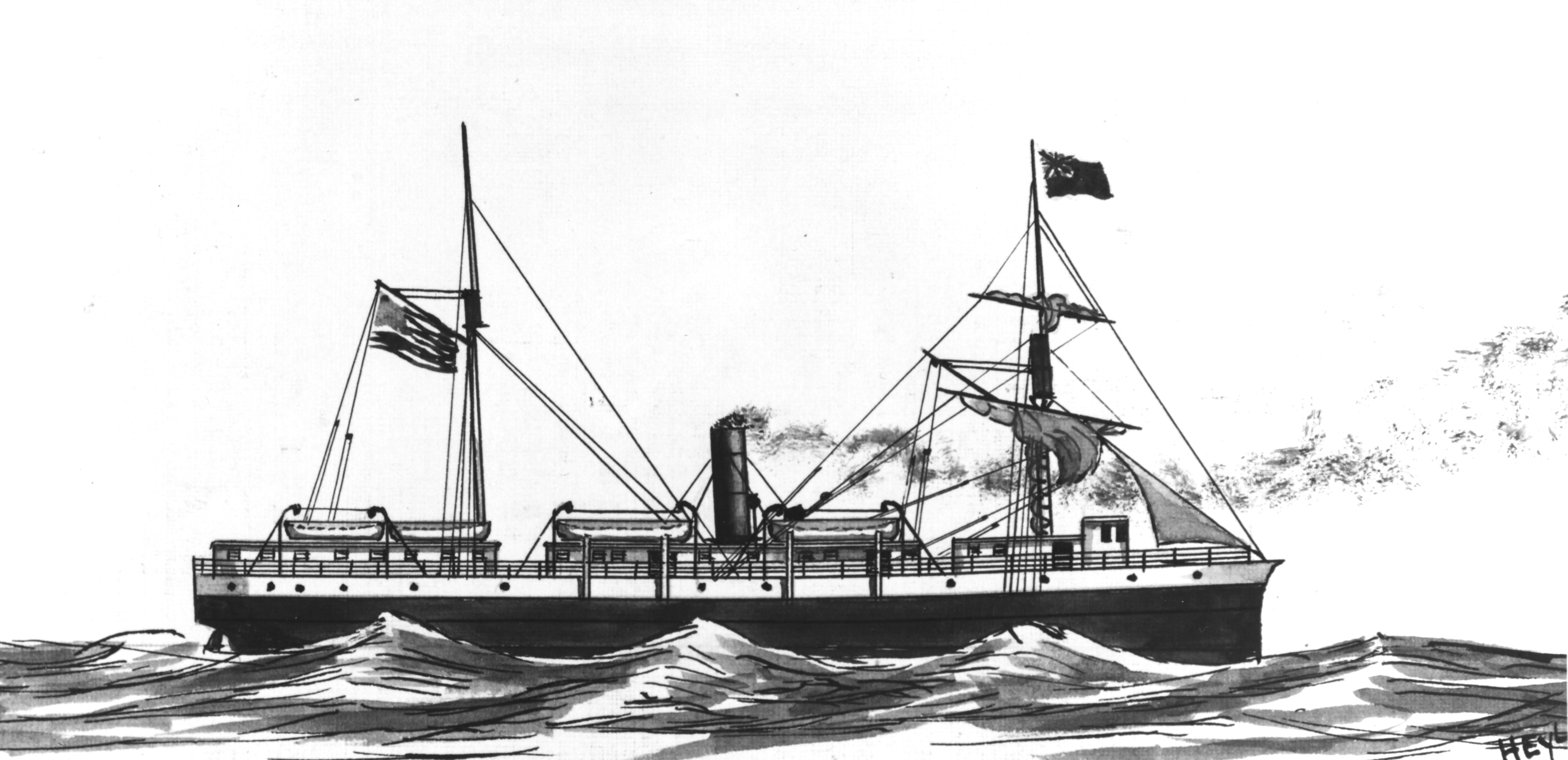
- Somerset, formerly USS Nereus, in postwar merchant service

History

United States
- Name: USS Nereus
- Namesake: Nereus
- Laid down: 1863
- Launched: 21 March 1863
- Acquired: by purchase, 5 October 1863
- Commissioned: 19 September 1864
- Decommissioned: 15 May 1865
- Fate: Sold, July 1865; Broken up, 1887

General characteristics
- Type: Screw Steamer
- Displacement: 1,244 long tons (1,264 t)
- Length: 200 ft (61 m)
- Beam: 34 ft 6 in (10.52 m)
- Draft: 13 ft 9 in (4.19 m)
- Depth of hold: 20 ft 8 in (6.30 m)
- Propulsion: Steam engine
- Speed: 11 knots (20 km/h; 13 mph)
- Complement: 164
- Armament: 1 × 100-pounder Parrott rifle; 2 × 30-pounder Parrott rifles; 6 × 32-pounder guns; 2 × 12-pounder rifles
- Armor: 4 in (100 mm)

The first USS Nereus, a screw steamer built at New York in 1863, was purchased by the Union Navy from William P. Williams on 5 October 1863; and commissioned at New York Navy Yard 19 April 1864, Commander John C. Howell in command.

== Service history ==
The schooner-rigged steamer joined the North Atlantic Blockading Squadron upon arriving Hampton Roads on 28 April 1864. She was assigned to the critical New Inlet station in the blockade of Wilmington, North Carolina. She continued helping to seal off this important Confederate port until getting underway for the North on 17 August.

The Nereus arrived in New York two days later for repairs. At this time Confederate cruiser CSS Tallahassee was alarming the North by the startling success of her operations against Union merchant shipping. Nereus departed New York on 3 September 1864, escorting the steamer SS North Star to Aspinwall with cargo to be carried overland across the Isthmus of Panama en route to California. She returned to New York on the 26th, for overdue repairs.

Back in top trim, Nereus departed New York escorting USS Dictator to Hampton Roads. From Norfolk she towed the single-turret monitor USS Saugus to Wilmington for the attack on Fort Fisher. Arriving Christmas morning, Nereus joined in the bombardment of the Confederate works and supported the abortive amphibious attack until the last Union troops had re-embarked.

Nereus remained in North Carolina waters until Rear Admiral Porter launched his successful attack against Fort Fisher on 13 January 1865. In the three-day struggle, a classic example of Army—Navy coordination, Union soldiers, sailors, and marines, supported by the deadly effective fire from Porter's warships, overran Wilmington's defenses, closing the vital Confederate seaport. Nereus crewman Thomas Kane was awarded the Medal of Honor for gallantry in this action.

On 17 January, Nereus got underway towing the monitor USS Mahopac to Charleston for final operations against the staunchly defended seaport which had witnessed the opening of hostilities almost four years before. Nereus then steamed to Beaufort for stores and coal before heading for the Bahamas and the Caribbean seeking to capture the Confederate cruiser Shenandoah which was still preying on northern merchantmen. She remained in the Caribbean until sailing north on 11 April, via Key West. She arrived New York 7 May decommissioned there on 15 May 1865, and was sold at public auction to James Hooper. Placed in commercial service as SS Somerset on 28 September 1865, the steamer operated as a merchant ship until 1881.

John Henderson of the Baltimore and Ohio Railroad, used her as part of the bidding process to win a mail service contract running between Baltimore and Liverpool. The railroad owned the Baltimore and Liverpool Steamship Co. under whose flag it operated such services. The Railroad bought 4 ships from the Navy; the other three vessels were the Allegany, The Carroll, and the Worcester; the Railroad decided to retain or change the names to Maryland counties.

== See also ==
- Confederate States Navy
