= USS Mullany (DD-528) =

Fletcher-class destroyer

Coordinates: 23.2042572°N 120.2108276°E

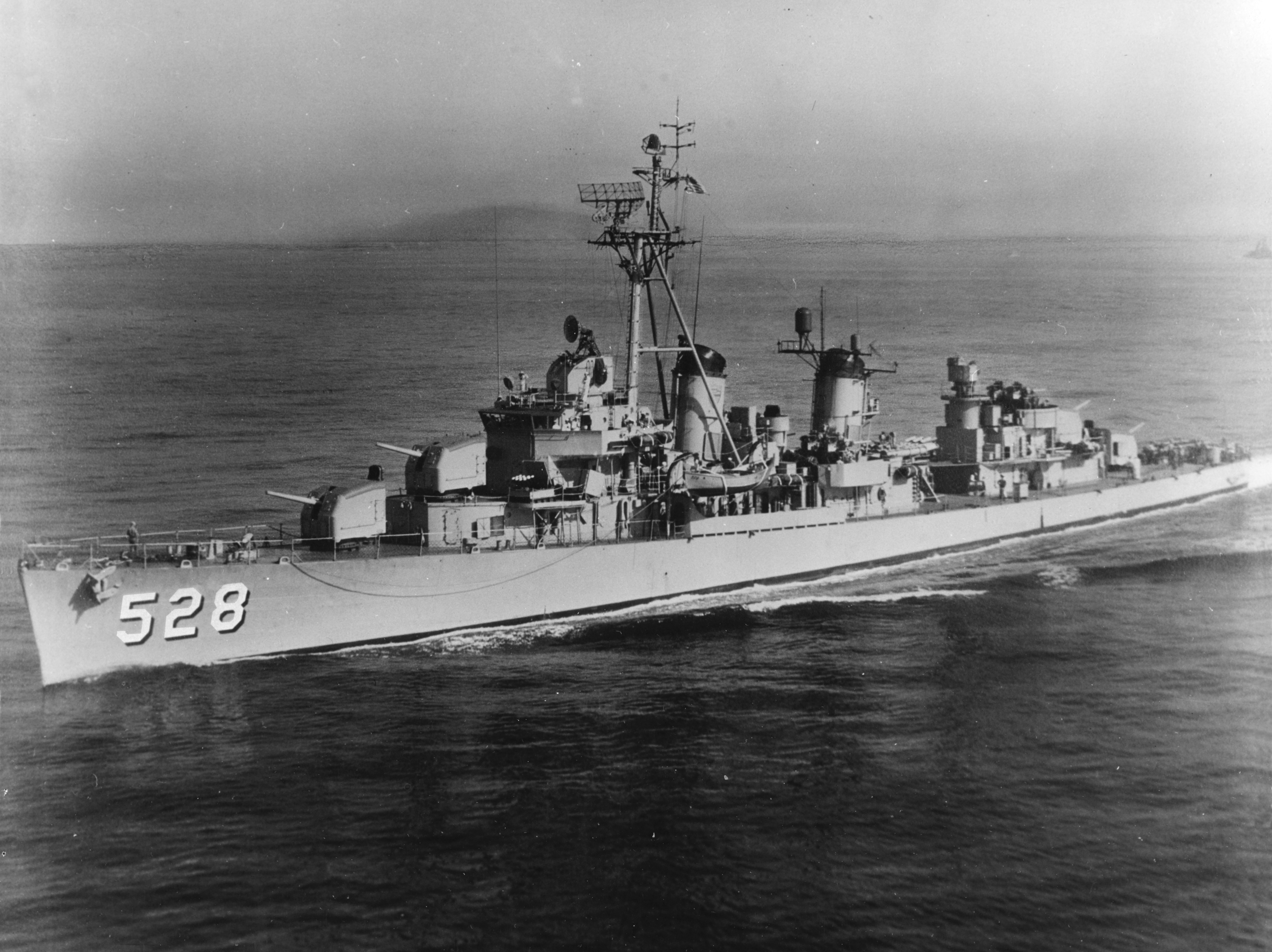
- USS Mullany underway on 6 April 1962

History

United States
- Name: Mullany
- Namesake: James Robert Madison Mullany
- Builder: Bethlehem Shipbuilding Corporation
- Laid down: 15 January 1942
- Launched: 10 October 1942
- Sponsored by: Mrs Elton W. Grenfell
- Commissioned: 23 April 1943
- Decommissioned: 14 February 1946
- Recommissioned: 8 March 1951
- Decommissioned: 6 October 1971
- Renamed: from Beatty
- Stricken: 6 October 1971
- Identification: Callsign: NAWF; Hull number: DD-528
- Motto: Guerreor Vieux; (Ageless Warrior)
- Honours and awards: See Awards
- Fate: Transferred to Taiwan, 6 October 1971
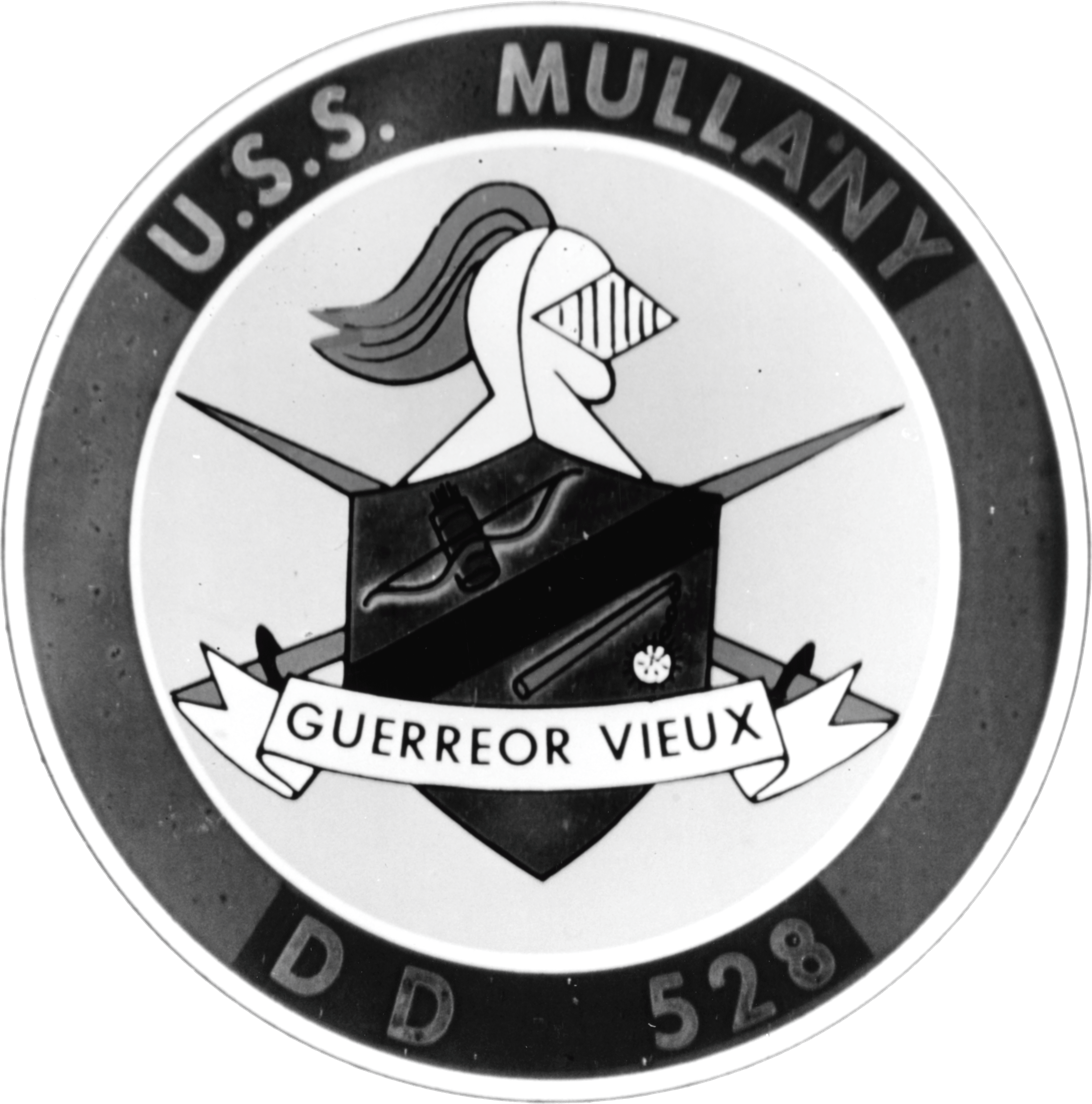
- Badge

History

Taiwan
- Name: Chin Yang; (慶陽)
- Namesake: Chin Yang
- Acquired: 6 October 1971
- Commissioned: 6 October 1971
- Reclassified: DD-947, January 1976; DD-909, 1 October 1979; DDG-909, mid-1980s
- Decommissioned: 16 July 1988
- Stricken: 16 July 1999
- Identification: Hull number: DD-9
- Fate: Sunk as artificial reef, 1 November 2001

General characteristics
- Class & type: Fletcher-class destroyer
- Displacement: 2,050 tons
- Length: 376 ft 6 in (114.76 m)
- Beam: 39 ft 8 in (12.09 m)
- Draft: 17 ft 9 in (5.41 m)
- Propulsion: 60,000 shp (45 MW); 2 propellers
- Speed: 35 kn (65 km/h; 40 mph)
- Range: 6,500 nmi (12,000 km; 7,500 mi) @ 15 kn (28 km/h; 17 mph)
- Complement: 336
- Armament: 5 × single Mk 12 5 in (127 mm)/38 guns; 5 × twin 40 mm (1.6 in) Bofors AA guns; 7 × single 20 mm (0.8 in) Oerlikon AA guns; 2 × quintuple 21 in (533 mm) torpedo tubes; 6 × single depth charge throwers; 2 × depth charge racks

USS Mullany (DD-528), a Fletcher-class destroyer, was the second ship of the United States Navy to be named for Rear Admiral James Robert Madison Mullany (1818–1887).

== Construction and career ==
Mullany was originally Beatty (DD-528) but was renamed on 28 May 1941. Laid down 15 January 1942 by Bethlehem Steel Co., Union Plant, San Francisco, Calif., she was launched 10 October 1942, sponsored by Mrs. Elton W. Grenfell; and commissioned 23 April 1943.

=== Service in the United States Navy ===
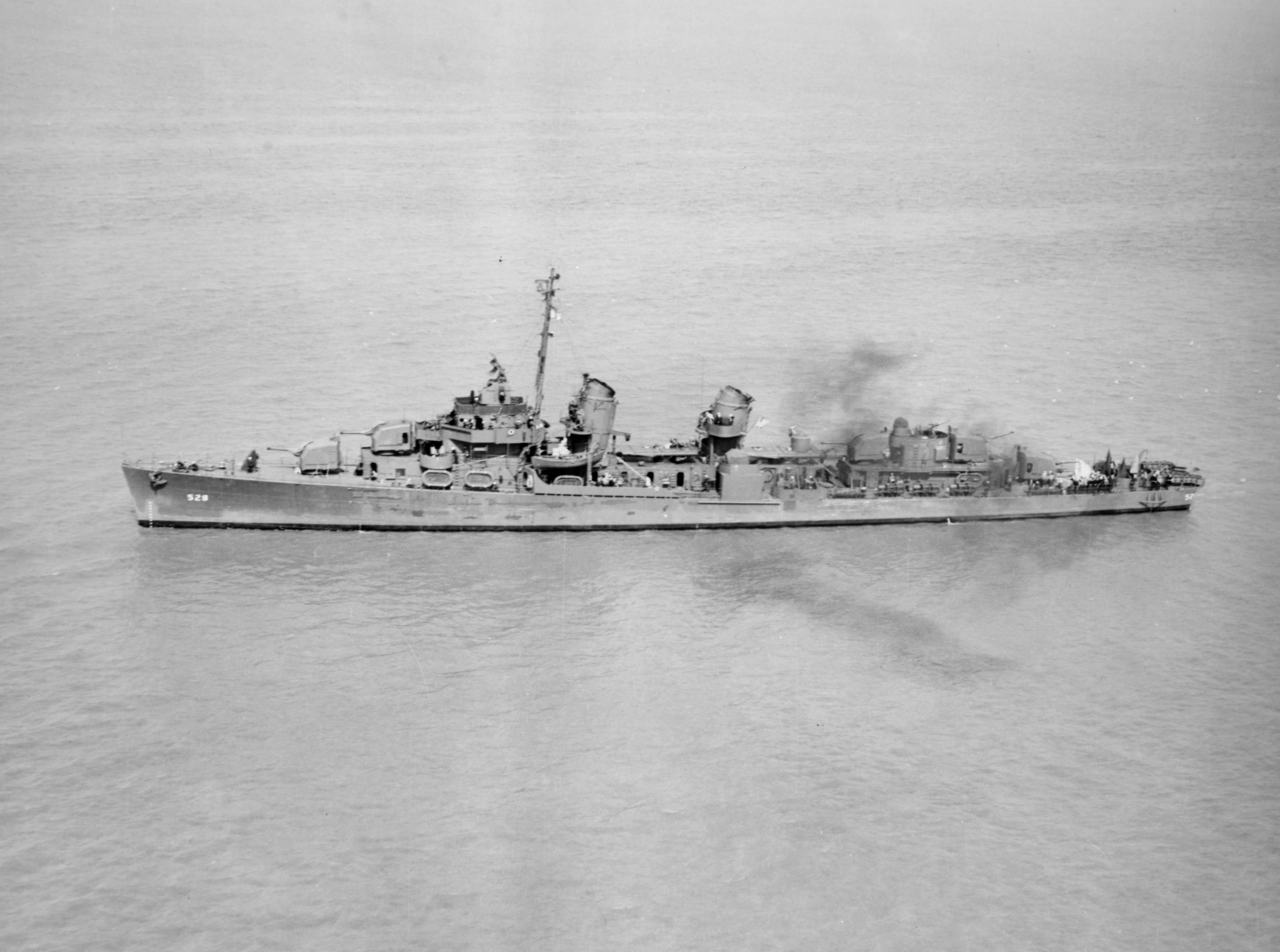
Mullany in San Francisco Bay in May 1943

After shakedown and training off San Diego and escort duty in the Aleutians, Mullany joined the 7th Fleet in the southwest Pacific in December 1943. Her first action came 2 to 4 March 1944 when she protected minesweepers clearing the approaches to Seeadler Harbor, Admiralty Islands, prior to the amphibious landings on Los Negros, the island forming the northeastern side of the harbor. Attracting Japanese gunfire, Mullany silenced the Japanese harbor defenses with 5 inch fire, enabling the minesweepers to complete their vital mission. For the next 2 days Mullany fired to support American troops fighting ashore.

Screening 7th Fleet flagship USS Wasatch (AGC-9) during the invasion of Leyte Gulf, Mullany fired to help drive off nine separate enemy air attacks from 20 to 29 October, then sailed for overhaul at San Francisco. After training near Hawaii in January 1945, she joined Task Force 54 (TF 54) for the invasion of Iwo Jima, to which she escorted troop transports. After firing in the preinvasion bombardment, she supported troops landing and fighting ashore, hitting caves and machinegun nests on Mount Suribachi 19 February.

While on anti-submarine picket duty guarding the Okinawa invasion force on 6 April 1945, Mullany opened fire on a Japanese kamikaze plane at 17:45. A few seconds later the fighter was smoking from numerous hits, but somehow managed to stay together. Skipper Comdr. Albert O. Momm ordered the ship to turn out of the kamikaze's path, but couldn't get out of the way in time. The plane slammed into the aft deckhouse. Before damage control parties could remove all the wounded from the twisted metal and exploding ammunition, the ship's depth charges exploded. In the next 20 minutes three more enemy aircraft attacked stricken Mullany. Her forward gunners downed two and drove the other away.

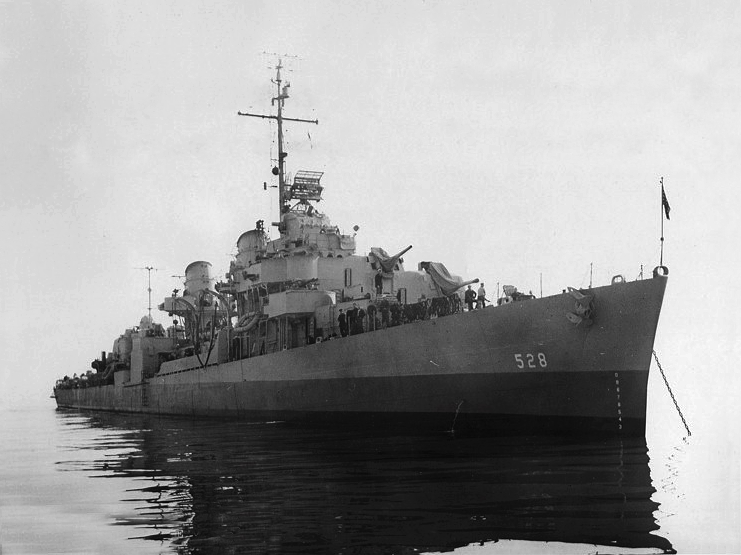
Mullany off Hunters Point Naval Shipyard on 6 January 1945

An hour later, Momm received a report that the bulkhead of one of the aft magazines was hot and an explosion was apparently imminent. Many of the ship's officers had seen the disastrous consequences of a magazine explosion, and at 18:29 Momm gave the order to abandon ship. USS Gherardi (DMS-30) stood by to take on survivors while her rescue and assistance team continued to spray water on Mullany. The USS Execute (AM-232) rescued 70 members of the Mullany crew from the water. The Execute then came alongside and helped fight the fires. In the next hours USS Purdy (DD-734) came alongside the burning ship and extinguished the flames. Since the expected explosion had been prevented by punctured fuel and water tanks flooding the compartments above the hot magazine, Commander Momm took a skeleton crew back aboard at 23:00. After the fires were extinguished the Execute attempted a tow using her sweep gear. At first the Mullany was in tow at low speed. With an increase in speed the sweep cable snapped and the tow attempt was discontinued. The Mullany crew then succeeded in lighting off one boiler, and Mullany limped off on one shaft for Pearl Harbor and San Francisco, arriving 29 May. Courage and determination had saved their ship, but 21 of her crew were killed, nine missing, and 36 wounded.

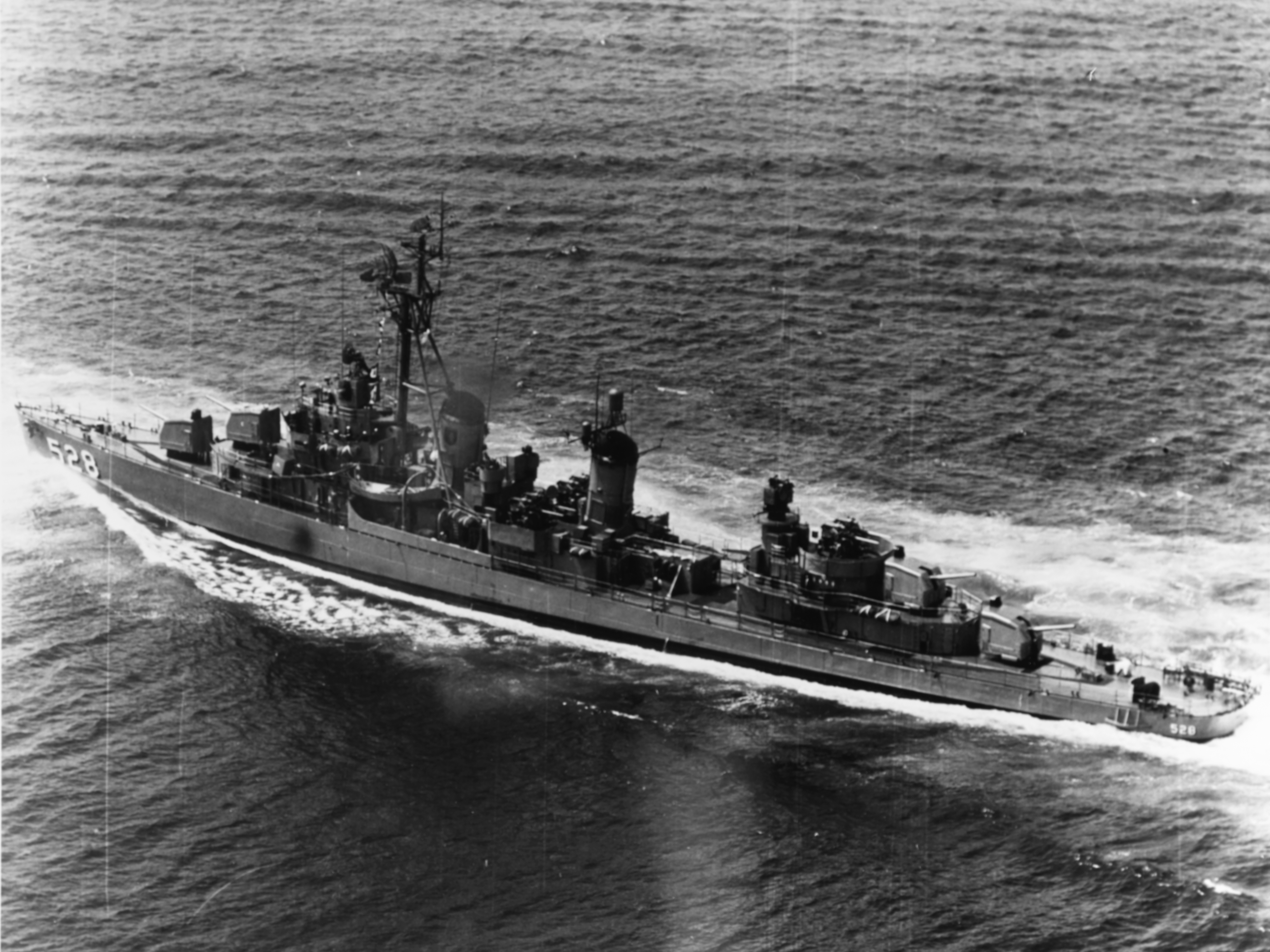
Mullany underway in the late 1950s

Completely repaired, Mullany put to sea 25 September for the Panama Canal and duty with the Atlantic Fleet, until decommissioning 14 February 1946 to join the Reserve Fleet at Charleston, South Carolina

Recommissioned 8 March 1951, Mullany rejoined the Atlantic Fleet and by January 1954 had made three deployments to the Mediterranean to join in the peace-keeping missions of the 6th Fleet.

With her squadron, Destroyer Squadron 18 (DesRon 18), Mullany departed Newport, R.I. 1 December 1954 for San Diego, where the squadron was redesignated DesRon 21 for service in the Pacific Fleet. In the next 10 years, Mullany served eight times in the western Pacific with the 7th Fleet, joining in patrol and training operations essential to the protection of freedom in Asia.

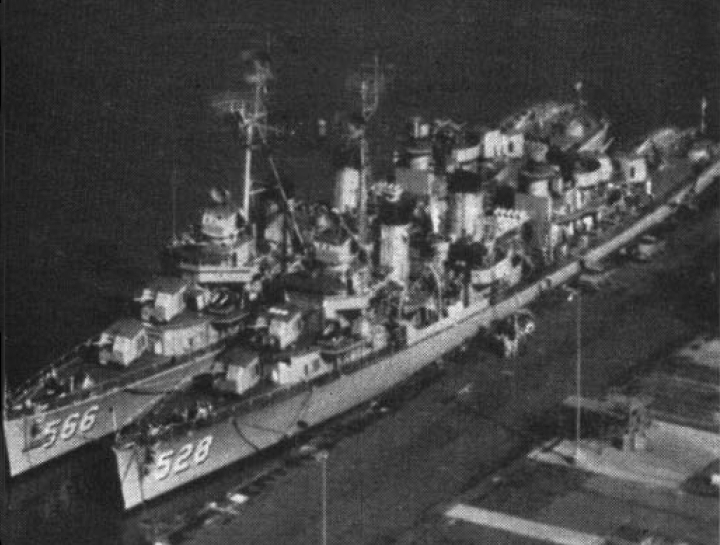
Mullany and Stoddard at Pearl Harbor in 1960

Veteran Mullany returned to combat during her ninth cruise to the coast of Asia, screening carrier USS Independence (CVA-62) in flight operations off Vietnam in 1965, as well as serving as harbor defense ship at Da Nang. On 6 July 1965, Mullany's five-inch guns were fired in anger for the first time since Okinawa. This time it was in support of the U.S. 7th Marine Regiment landing at Qui Nhon. During that cruise Mullany encountered the first known Soviet spy ship off the coast of Vietnam. The "Ivan", as Mullany's crew dubbed her, was disguised as a fishing vessel. Mullany "shadowed" the Ivan for several days, collecting vital intelligence before turning over the shadowing duty to a fleet tug. The following year she returned to the coast of Vietnam to seek out and destroy craft moving enemy supplies. From 20 to 30 November 1966, she destroyed 28 enemy watercraft and damaged 26 others with her 5-inch guns. She screened USS Ticonderoga (CVA-14) until sailing for San Diego in March 1967. Following an overhaul at Long Beach, Mullany spent the remainder of the year conducting refresher training and local operations off the coast of California.

In February 1968, she once again deployed to the Western Pacific. On 24 April 1968 the positions of the 1st Battalion, 26th Marines at Wunder Beach were hit by 11-15 rounds of fire from the ship killing two Marines. On 9 July 1968, Mullany left Vietnamese waters for the last time. During 137 days at sea, she had steamed 46,468 miles, nearly twice around the Earth. Over a career that spanned 25 years, she would have circumnavigated the globe more than 40 times. After a visit to Auckland, New Zealand, she returned to San Diego in September.

Based in Long Beach, Mullany spent the next two years steaming up and down the West Coast as a reserve training ship. By 1971, Mullany was the oldest destroyer on active service. She was decommissioned and stricken from the Naval Vessel Register 6 October 1971, and sold to the Republic of China for $150,000, plus $3,000, "administrative charges."

=== Service in the Republic of China ===
On 9 December 1969, the ship underwent an overhaul and Wujin No. 1 special shipyard at the No. 1 Naval Shipyard. the original Mark 37 fire control and command system was replaced with Wuyi fire control and command system. In 1971, the completion in May greatly increased the combat power of the ship.

Transferred to the Republic of China Navy 6 October 1971, the ship was renamed Chin-yang (慶陽).

In December 1974, the ship began the installation of the Hsiung Feng II missile at the Navy's No. 1 Shipyard. The Installation was completed in May 1975.

On 2 April 1975, at 10:10 a.m. DDG-909 successfully launched the first Surface-to-Air missile in ROC Navy history, and that marks the missile era for the ROC Navy. DDG-909 Chin-Yang was in service of ROC Navy for 26 years and through 20 Commanding Officers. The mission was patrolling the Taiwan Strait and surrounding waters to convoy offshore-islands-support-and-supply, task flotilla and various missions. She played an important role on the Navy force built-up and fleet combat readiness, secure the safety of Taiwan Strait and Maritime communications.

The ship's weapon system was gradually modified and In January 1976, her number was changed to DD-947.

Later on 1 October 1979, her number was changed to DD-909.

The ship was later modified by Wujin No. 1 to become a missile destroyer, DDG-909.

She was stricken 16 July 1999 and sunk as an artificial reef on 1 November 2001.

The ship's anchor and propeller is on display at Mantou Military History Park, Tainan. One of her gun, the other anchor and propeller is on display at the Yuanzhiluxiuxian Park, Tainan. Another 5-inch gun has been moved aboard the museum ship USS Sarsfield with her anchor and propeller is located in Dayuan.

== Awards ==
Mullany received seven battle stars for World War II service.
