= William E. Le Roy =

United States naval officer (1818–1888)

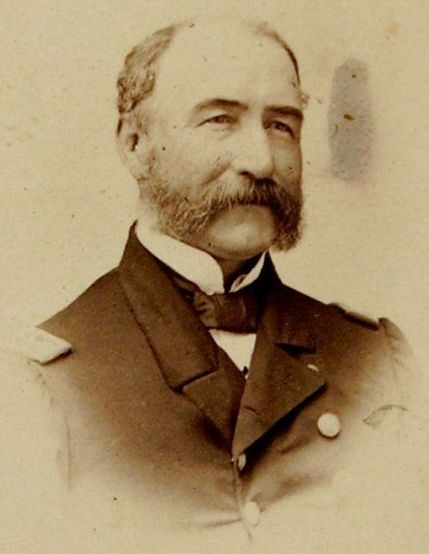
- Born: March 24, 1818; New York City, US
- Died: December 10, 1888 (aged 70); New York City, US
- Military career
- Allegiance: United States
- Branch: United States Navy
- Service years: 1832–1880
- Rank: Rear admiral
- Commands: USS Mystic; USS Keystone State; USS Oneida; USS Ossipee; South Atlantic Squadron; North Atlantic Squadron; European Squadron
- Conflicts: Mexican–American War; African Slave Trade Patrol; American Civil War: Union blockade; Battle of Mobile Bay

William Edgar Le Roy (March 24, 1818 – December 10, 1888) was an officer in the United States Navy who served in the Mexican War, on the African Slave Trade Patrol, and in the American Civil War. He rose to the rank of rear admiral and late in his career was consecutively commander-in-chief of the South Atlantic Squadron, the North Atlantic Squadron, and the European Squadron.

== Early life ==
Le Roy was born in New York City on March 24, 1818.

== Naval career ==
=== Early career ===
Le Roy was appointed as a midshipman on January 11, 1832. His first tour of duty was aboard the ship-of-the-line USS Delaware in the Mediterranean Squadron from 1833 to 1836. He next served aboard the new brig USS Dolphin in the Brazil Squadron from 1837 to 1838. Promoted to passed midshipman on June 23, 1838, he was aboard the frigate USS Constitution in the Pacific Squadron from 1839 to 1840 and the store ship USS Erie from 1842 to 1843. He was promoted to lieutenant on July 13, 1843.

=== Mexican War ===
In 1846, Le Roy reported aboard the paddle frigate USS Mississippi in the Home Squadron. Aboard her, he took part in the opening stages of the Mexican War. Before the end of 1846, Mississippi participated in expeditions against Alvarado, Tampico, Pánuco, and Laguna de los Términos, Mexico, all successful in tightening American control of the Mexican coastline and interrupting Mexico's coastwise commerce and military supply operations. In 1847 he served aboard the Home Squadron steamer USS Princeton off Mexico, and took part in an engagement with Mexican troops at Rio Aribiqua while ashore to collect drinking water for Princeton.

=== Between the wars ===
After the conclusion of the Mexican War, Le Roy served aboard the frigate USS Savannah in the Pacific Squadron from 1849 to 1851. He spent 1852 awaiting orders, but from 1853 to 1855 he was again aboard Savannah, this time operating in the Brazil Squadron. He had duty at Naval Station Sackets Harbor in Sackets Harbor, New York, from 1857 to 1858, then returned to sea for a tour aboard the frigate USS Sabine in the Brazil Squadron in 1859. He took part in the African Slave Trade Patrol as commanding officer of the steamer USS Mystic in the Africa Squadron in 1861.

=== American Civil War ===
The American Civil War broke out in April 1861. Promoted to commander on July 1, 1861, Le Roy took command of the sidewheel steamer USS Keystone State on November 12, 1861. Under his command, Keystone State joined the South Atlantic Blockading Squadron off Charleston, South Carolina, on January 13, 1862, for service in the Union blockade of the Confederate States of America. She soon was in action, exchanging fire with Confederate artillery on Amelia Island on January 18, 1862, and capturing the schooner Mars on February 5, 1862. Keystone State took part in the occupation of Fernandina, Florida, on 3 March 1862 and, although two blockade runners that she sighted escaped her on April 3, 1862, she forced the schooner Liverpool to beach herself and burned her to the waterline on April 10, 1862. During 1862, she went on to capture the schooner Dixie on April 15, the steamer Elizabeth on May 29, the schooner Cora on May 31, and the blockade runner Sarah off Charleston on June 20. She chased a steamer all day on June 24 without being able to capture her, but on August 22, 1862, she took the schooner Fanny and her cargo of salt off Charleston.

On January 31, 1863, Keystone State opened fire on a ship off Charleston. It returned fire, scoring hits on Keystone State, one of which struck her steam drum, rupturing it and scalding 20 men to death and injuring 20 others. After repairs, Keystone State took up a blockading station off St. Simons Sound, Georgia.

After Keystone State decommissioned for an overhaul in the summer of 1863, Le Roy took command of the screw sloop-of-war USS Oneida in the West Gulf Blockading Squadron, then moved on to command of the screw sloop-of-war USS Ossipee in the same squadron. Aboard Ossipee, he took part in the Battle of Mobile Bay on August 5, 1864. Struck by Confederate gunfire many times, Ossipee remained underway and in action and played a large role in forcing the Confederate States Navy ironclad CSS Tennessee to surrender; as Ossipee was about to ram Tennessee, Tennessee displayed a surrender flag, and Le Roy personally accepted the surrender of her commanding officer. Le Roy remained in command of Ossipee on blockade duty through the end of the war in April 1865.

=== Post-Civil War ===
Promoted to captain on July 25, 1866, Le Roy served at the Naval Rendezvous at Philadelphia, Pennsylvania, from 1866 to 1867. He returned to sea in 1867 as a member of the staff of the European Squadron, serving as the squadron's fleet captain from 1867 to 1868. Promoted to commodore on July 3, 1870, Le Roy was on special duty at New London, Connecticut, during 1871 and was senior officer of the Board of Examiners from 1872 to 1873. Promoted to rear admiral on April 5, 1874, he was commander-in-chief of the South Atlantic Squadron from 1874 until January 1876.

Le Roy became commander-in-chief of the North Atlantic Squadron on February 14, 1876. Upon assuming command, he received orders from the United States Department of the Navy to concentrate his ships at the Navy's new naval depot at Port Royal, South Carolina, from which both Le Roy and the Department of the Navy hoped that during his tenure as commander-in-chief the North Atlantic Squadron would operate together as a cohesive, tactical unit, rather than scatter its ships on individual operations as generally had been the case since the squadron's creation in 1865. Accordingly, Le Roy organized the squadron into four divisions – with wooden cruising ships in three divisions and its support ships and monitors in a reserve division – and made plans to exercise the squadron off Port Royal and then conduct a Caribbean cruise as a combined squadron, conducting tactical exercises at sea as it voyaged from port to port. However, a month after he assumed command, unrest in Haiti threatened American interests there, and on March 14, 1876, the Department of the Navy directed Le Roy to send two ships to Port-au-Prince. Only two days later, on March 16, 1876, unrest in Mexico prompted the Department of the Navy to order him to send four other ships – the steam sloops-of-war USS Hartford, USS Swatara, and USS Marion, and the gunboat USS Shawmut – to Tampico and from there to distribute them individually among Mexican ports as needed to protect American interests, with at least one of them stationed at the mouth of the Rio Grande. On April 1, 1876, the Department of the Navy ordered Le Roy to send a fifth ship – it suggested the new gunboat USS Huron – to visit ports on the east coast of Mexico. With the squadron's ships thus scattered, Le Roy and the Department of the Navy dropped their plans for tactical exercises and a squadron cruise.

Relinquishing command of the North Atlantic Squadron on August 31, 1876, Le Roy served as commander-in-chief of the European Squadron from October 5, 1877, to January 23, 1879. He retired from the Navy upon reaching the statutory retirement age of 62 on March 24, 1880.

== Death ==
Le Roy died of apoplexy at his residence in the Victoria Hotel in New York City on December 10, 1888.

== Bibliography ==
=== References ===
- Hamersly, Lewis Randolph. The Records of Living Officers of the U.S. Navy and Marine Corps, Third Edition. Philadelphia: J. B. Lippincott & Co., 1878.
- Rentfrow, James C. Home Squadron: The U.S. Navy on the North Atlantic Station. Annapolis, Maryland: Naval Institute Press, 2014. ISBN 978-1-61251-447-5.

Military offices
Preceded by ?	Commander-in-Chief, South Atlantic Squadron; 1874 – January 1876	Succeeded by ?
Preceded by J. R. M. Mullany	Commander-in-Chief, North Atlantic Squadron; 14 February – 31 August 1876	Succeeded by John C. Howell
Preceded by John L. Worden	Commander-in-Chief, European Squadron; 5 October 1877 – 23 January 1879	Succeeded by John C. Howell
