= USS Purdy =

Allen M. Sumner-class destroyer

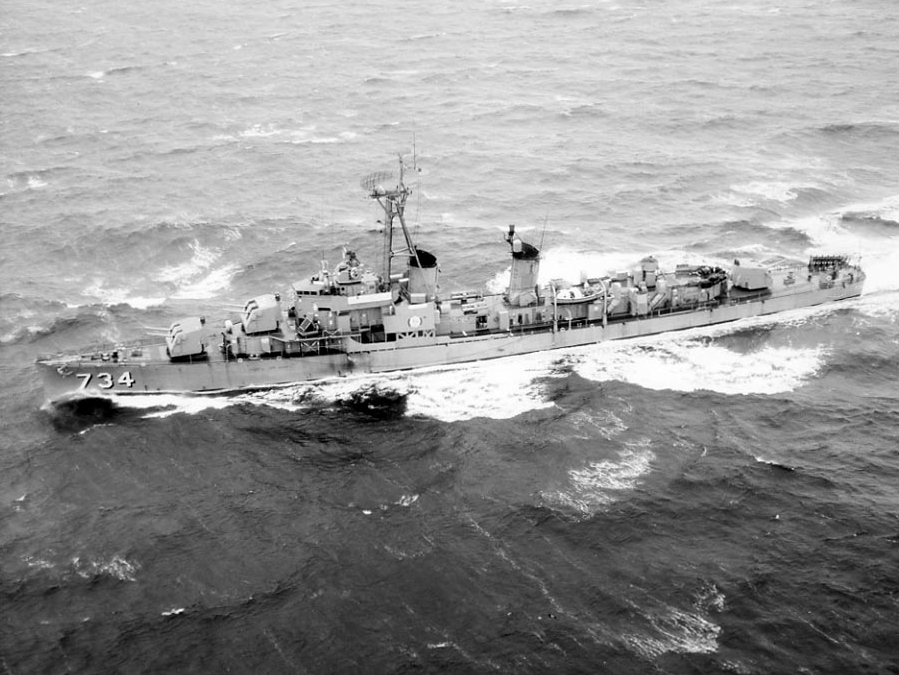
- USS Purdy (DD-734) underway in Narragansett Bay in 1971

History

United States
- Name: Purdy
- Namesake: Frederick Warren Purdy
- Builder: Bath Iron Works
- Laid down: 22 December 1943
- Launched: 7 May 1944
- Commissioned: 18 July 1944
- Decommissioned: c.1973
- Stricken: 1 July 1973
- Fate: Scrapped

General characteristics
- Class & type: Allen M. Sumner-class destroyer
- Displacement: 2,250 tons
- Length: 376 ft 6 in (114.76 m)
- Beam: 40 ft (12 m)
- Draft: 15 ft 8 in (4.78 m)
- Propulsion: 60,000 shp (45,000 kW); 2 propellers
- Speed: 34 knots (63 km/h; 39 mph)
- Range: 6,500 nmi (12,000 km; 7,500 mi) at 15 kn (28 km/h; 17 mph)
- Complement: 336
- Armament: 6 × 5 in (127 mm)/38 cal. guns, 12 × 40 mm AA guns, 11 × 20 mm AA guns, 10 × 21 inch (533 mm) torpedo tubes, 6 × depth charge projectors, 2 × depth charge tracks

USS Purdy (DD-734), was an Allen M. Sumner-class destroyer of the United States Navy.

== Namesake ==
Frederick Warren Purdy was born on 4 December 1911 in Chicago, Illinois. He graduated from the United States Naval Academy and was commissioned as an ensign on 1 June 1933. He served at sea on the USS Mississippi, USS Bagley and USS California and ashore at Newport, Rhode Island, Washington, D.C., and Annapolis, Maryland. On 7 December 1941 during the Japanese Attack on Pearl Harbor he was stationed on the California, Kenneth Dawson wrote in his after action report to the California's captain "I would like to recommend that you consider writing an official commendatory letter regarding Lieutenant F. W. Purdy. Purdy was apparently overlooked when all the J.O.'s were commended for fighting fires, rescuing wounded, etc. Purdy went to Plot when G.Q. sounded; left there after establishing communications and checking switching; manned Air Defense and took over Sky Control (and nearly got strafed en route) and remained there during the entire attack. After I had him relieved (Mandelkorn was not then on board) Purdy personally fought fires, took charge of the various parties engaged therein, supervised rescue of badly burned and injured personnel, and in general did the usual good work for which he could always be depended upon. I think he was one of the best officers on the ship and his work on the 7th merits commendation."

On 10 June 1942 he reported to the destroyer USS Strong as a prospective executive officer, and sailed aboard the destroyer to the Solomon Islands. Strong was part of a task force that bombarded Vila and Bairoko Harbor, initiating the naval part of the campaign for Munda. On the night of 4–5 July 1943, Strong was sunk. Lieutenant Commander Purdy assisted forecastle personnel to a rescue vessel and then returned to search for an injured man reported to be on the deck behind the gun mount. He was not seen again, and he was posthumously awarded the Silver Star.

== Construction and commissioning ==
Purdy (DD-734) was laid down by the Bath Iron Works, Bath, Maine, 22 December 1943 and launched on 7 May 1944; sponsored by Mrs. F. W. Purdy, widow of Lieutenant Commander Purdy. The ship was commissioned on 18 July 1944.

== Service history ==
=== World War II ===
Following shakedown off Bermuda and operations in the Caribbean, Purdy departed Trinidad, 7 February 1945 for San Diego, whence she steamed west arriving at Leyte 17 March to rehearse the invasion of Okinawa. Ten days later she sailed with TU 51.13.2 for Okinawa. Screening the transports of the Southern Attack Force en route, she arrived 1 April and assumed radar picket station duty off that last Japanese bastion. Continuing that kamikaze imperiled duty after the initial landings, she fought fires on, and then returned injured survivors from, heavily damaged destroyer Mullany to Kerama Retto on 6 April. Six days later, with Cassin Young some 60 miles off Okinawa, she suffered a similar fate.

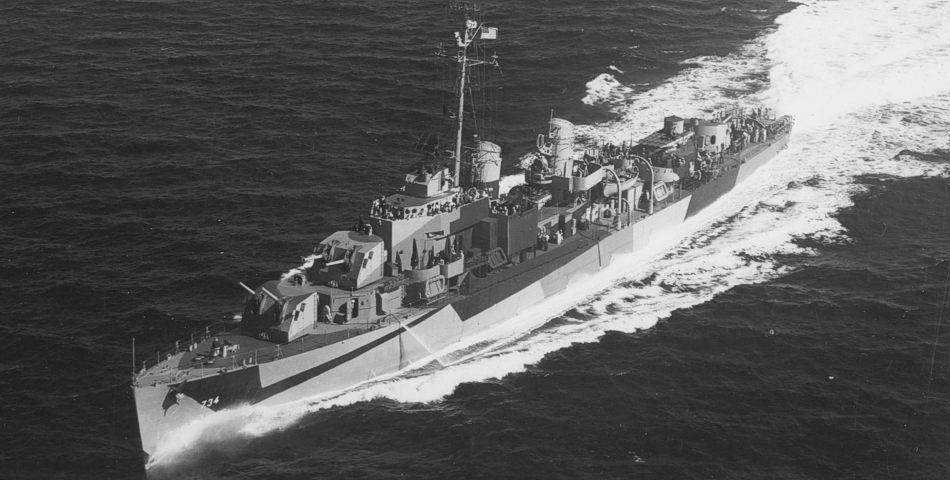
Purdy underway in July 1944.

Attacked by a formation of about 30 enemy planes, both ships opened fire and with the aid of carrier aircraft were able to turn away most of the attackers. Two, however, broke through to score hits on Cassin Young. A third, closing Purdy, was splashed but momentum carried it to the destroyer where its bomb broke loose, pierced her plating and exploded to kill 15, seriously wound 25, and cause extensive damage.

Purdy made it back to Kerama Retto, underwent temporary repairs there and at Guam, and arrived at San Francisco 28 May. Repairs and training completed she sailed to Hawaii, thence 20 October to Japan. In Japanese waters for the next four months, she served as harbor control vessel at Point Bungo, transported passengers and mail, and performed medical and guard duties. On 21 February 1946, she sailed for San Diego, thence proceeded to Portland, Maine, arriving 16 April. In June, she entered the Boston Navy Yard for a six-month overhaul; then, in December, shifted to her homeport, Newport, Rhode Island. Spring maneuvers in the Caribbean preceded her first Mediterranean tour and in mid-August 1947 she returned to Newport. From September 1948 to January 1949 she again sailed in European waters and in June she reported to New Orleans, whence she conducted naval reserve training cruises until March 1951. Then deployed to the Mediterranean, she resumed operations out of Newport in June.

=== Korean War ===
Four months later Purdy, with DesDiv 122, got underway for a return to a Pacific combat zone and on 31 October reported to TF 95 off the coast of Korea. Fire support for minesweeping operations at Hungnam preceded five weeks as flagship, Songjin-Chongjin unit of the Blockade and Escort Force. Christmas in Japan and antisubmarine training exercises off Okinawa interrupted combat operations, but in January 1952 she returned to Korean waters and for the next six weeks sailed with TF 77, the fast carrier force.

Relieved from Korean War duty 27 February, Purdy sailed for home via the Suez Canal and on 21 March completed her round-the-world cruise. Western Atlantic and Caribbean exercises carried her into 1953 and on 27 April she departed Newport for a second circumnavigation of the earth. Steaming via Suez, she arrived at Yokosuka on 9 June and after availability again took up duties with TF 77. Escort duty for the cruiser Bremerton, bombardment and patrol operations from Chongjin to Wonsan, and duty with TF 96 preceded a reassignment to TF 77 and finally to TF 95 again for Pusan-Pohang patrol. Departing the Far East almost two months after the truce, she arrived at San Francisco 5 October and was back in the New England area by the end of the month.

=== Cold War ===
After Korea, Purdy regularly rotated east coast and Caribbean training operations with NATO exercises and 6th Fleet duty. In June 1955 she received the first Atomic-Biological-Chemical washdown system to be introduced to the fleet and-during the summers of 1956, 1957, and 1958—she made midshipmen summer training cruises, to Chile in 1957 and to Europe in 1958. Two years later while calling at Gythion, Greece, three of her crew were injured ashore assisting the local inhabitants contain a raging fire until fire fighting equipment could be brought from 25 miles (40 km) away. On its arrival Purdy's "fire-fighters" continued to assist by manning hoses which replaced the bucket brigade.

Purdy was employed with the recovery forces for Project Mercury in the spring of 1961 and in the fall she cruised off the Dominican Republic supporting U.S. efforts to maintain stability in the Caribbean. A year later she returned to that sea for the same reason, but off a different island, and during November operated with other vessels implementing the Cuban Quarantine during the Cuban Missile Crisis.

On 1 April 1965 Purdy left DesRon 12 to commence operations with ResDesRon 30. Homeported at Fall River, Massachusetts, into 1970, she trained naval reservists, served as a school ship for Naval Destroyer School officer students, and tested and evaluated new equipment.

She was stricken from the register on 1 July 1973. Purdy was sold on 11 June 1974 to Northern Metals, Philadelphia and broken up for scrap.

Purdy earned one battle star during World War II and 3 during the Korean War.
