= North Atlantic Squadron =

Military unit of the United States Navy

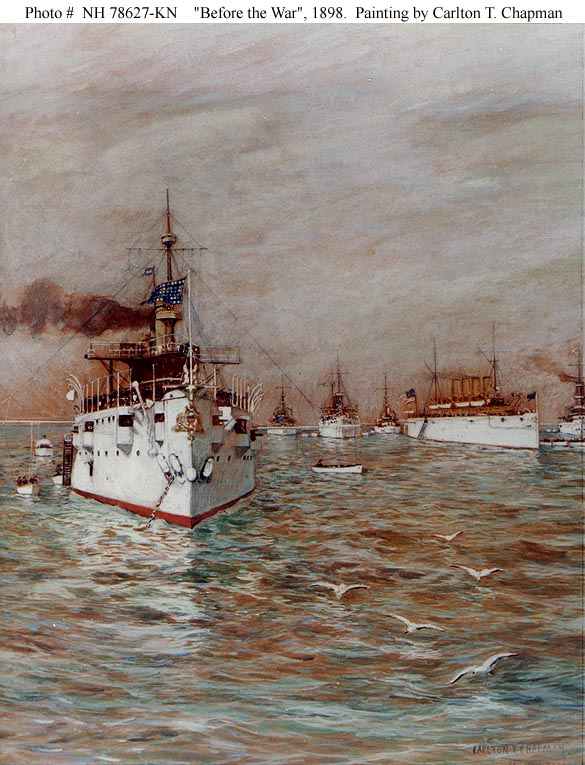
- "Before the War" by Carlton T. Chapman, depicting the North Atlantic Squadron off Hampton Roads, Virginia, in 1898, just prior to the Spanish–American War.
- Active: 1 November 1865 – 29 December 1902
- Country: United States
- Branch: United States Navy
- Type: Naval squadron

North Atlantic Fleet
- Active: 29 December 1902 – 1 January 1906
- Country: United States
- Branch: United States Navy
- Type: Naval fleet

The North Atlantic Squadron was a section of the United States Navy operating in the North Atlantic. It was renamed as the North Atlantic Fleet in 1902. In 1905 the European and South Atlantic squadrons were abolished and absorbed into the North Atlantic Fleet. On 1 January 1906, the Navy's Atlantic Fleet was established by combining the North Atlantic Fleet with the South Atlantic Squadron.

== Spanish-American war ==
The USS Maine was detached from the squadron and sent to Havana Harbor to protect U.S. interests during the Cuban War of Independence. She exploded and sank on the evening of 15 February 1898, killing 268 sailors, or three-quarters of her crew, leading to the Spanish-American War. The squadron was mobilized and a large part was moved to Key West and the Gulf of Mexico. Others were moved just off the shore of Lisbon and to Hong Kong.

== Commanders-in-Chief ==
=== North Atlantic Squadron ===
- Commodore/Rear Admiral James S. Palmer 1 November 1865 – 7 December 1867
- Rear Admiral Henry K. Hoff 22 February 1868 – 19 August 1869
- Rear Admiral Charles H. Poor 19 August 1869 – 9 June 1870
- Rear Admiral Samuel Phillips Lee June 1870 – May 1873
- Rear Admiral Gustavus H. Scott May 1873 – 13 June 1874
- Rear Admiral James Robert Madison Mullany 13 June 1874 – January 1876
- Rear Admiral William E. Le Roy January 1876 – September 1876
- Rear Admiral Stephen Decatur Trenchard September 1876 – September 1878
- Rear Admiral John C. Howell September 1878 – January 1879
- Rear Admiral Robert H. Wyman January 1879 – 1 May 1882
- Rear Admiral George H. Cooper 1 May 1882 – 19 June 1884
- Commodore Stephen B. Luce 26 June 1884 – 20 September 1884
- Rear Admiral James E. Jouett 20 September 1884 – June 1886
- Rear Admiral Stephen B. Luce 18 June 1886 – 28 January 1889
- Rear Admiral Bancroft Gherardi 28 January 1889 – 10 September 1892
- Rear Admiral John G. Walker 10 September 1892 – June 1893
- Rear Admiral Andrew E. K. Benham June 1893 – April 1894
- Rear Admiral Richard W. Meade III April 1894 – May 1895
- Commodore Francis M. Bunce 2 June 1895 – 1 May 1897
- Rear Admiral Montgomery Sicard 1 May 1897 – 28 March 1898
- Rear Admiral William T. Sampson 28 March 1898 – October 1899
- Rear Admiral Norman H. Farquhar October 1899 – 1 May 1901
- Rear Admiral Francis J. Higginson 1 May 1901 – 29 December 1902

=== North Atlantic Fleet ===
- Rear Admiral Francis J. Higginson 29 December 1902 – July 1903
- Rear Admiral Albert S. Barker July 1903 – March 1905
- Rear Admiral Robley D. Evans March 1905 – 1 January 1906

== See also ==
- Asiatic Squadron
- East India Squadron
- Flying Squadron (United States Navy)
- Home Squadron
- Mediterranean Squadron (United States)
- Pacific Squadron
- West Indies Squadron (United States)
