= European Squadron =

Military unit of the United States Navy

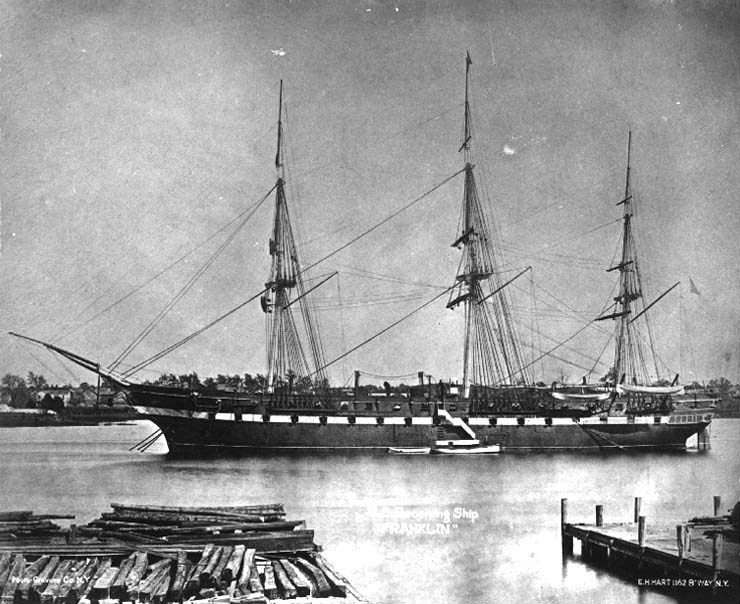
- USS Franklin – squadron flagship from 1867 to 1868
- Active: 1865–1905
- Country: United States
- Branch: United States Navy
- Type: Naval squadron

The European Squadron, also known as the European Station, was a part of the United States Navy in the late 19th century and the early 1900s. The squadron was originally named the Mediterranean Squadron and renamed following the American Civil War. In 1905, the squadron was absorbed into the North Atlantic Fleet.

== Second Anglo-Egyptian War ==
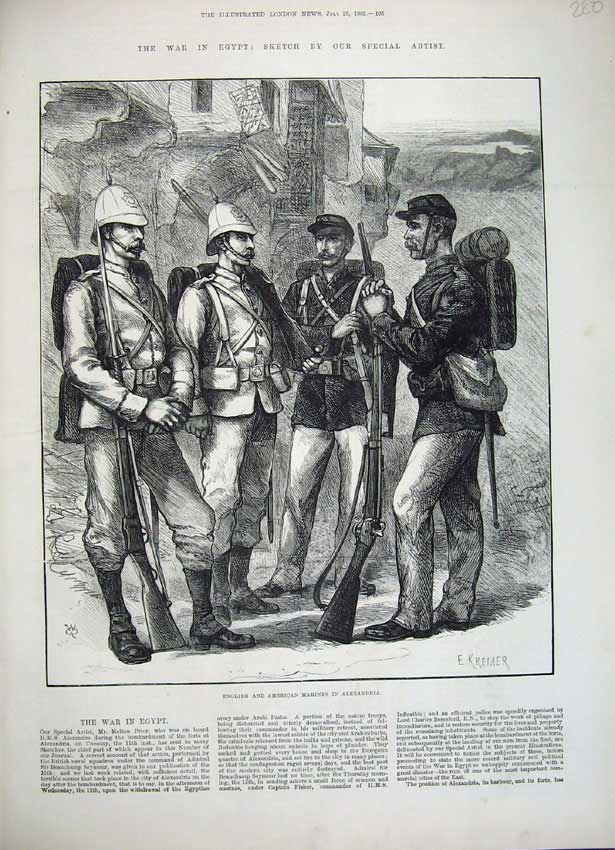
United States Marines and Royal Marines during the occupation of Alexandria in 1882

The Egyptian Expedition in June and July 1882 was a response by the United States to the British and French attack on Alexandria during the Anglo-Egyptian War. To protect American citizens and their property within the city, ships of the European Squadron, under Rear Admiral James Nicholson, were sent to Egypt with orders to observe the conflict ashore and make a landing if necessary. British and French forces heavily damaged the city and started a large fire so a force of marines and sailors were landed and they assisted in fire fighting and guarding the American consulate from insurgents. Casper F. Goodrich, who served as an executive officer on the USS Lancaster, commanded the landing party and would later publish an extensive report on the bombardment.

== Early 20th century ==
The European Squadron returned to U.S. waters at the start of the Spanish–American War in April 1898, and did not return to Europe until July 1901, when Admiral Bartlett J. Cromwell was placed in command with the cruiser USS Chicago as flagship. Other ships of the squadron from July 1901 included the cruiser USS Albany and the gunboat USS Nashville.

== Commanders ==
Name	Picture	Rank	Assigned (Orders)	Assumed (On Station)	Relieved (Orders)	Relieved (On Station)	Flagship(s)
RADM Louis M. Goldsborough			February 1865	18 July 1865	1867	14 July 1867	Colorado
ADM David G. Farragut			?	14 July 1867	?	10 November 1868	Franklin
CDRE Alexander M. Pennock			?	10 November 1868	?	28 February 1869	Ticonderoga
RADM William Radford			?	1869	?	1 March 1870	Franklin
RADM Oliver S. Glisson			?	August 1870	?	January 1871	Franklin
RADM Charles S. Boggs			?	January 1871	?	1 January 1872	Franklin; Plymouth; Brooklyn
RADM James Alden Jr.			?	1 January 1872	?	2 June 1873	Wabash; Brooklyn
RADM Augustus Case			?	1873	?	1875	Franklin; Wabash
RADM John L. Worden			?	1875	?	5 October 1877	Franklin; Marion; Trenton
RADM William E. Le Roy			?	5 October 1877	?	23 January 1879	Trenton
CAPT John Lee Davis (pro tem)			?	23 January 1879	?	February 1879	Trenton
RADM John C. Howell			1878	February 1879	?	16 September 1881	Trenton; Quinnebaug; Wyoming
RADM James W. Nicholson			?	16 September 1881	February 1883	10 March 1883	Lancaster
RADM Charles H. Baldwin			?	10 March 1883	?	September 1884	Lancaster
RADM Earl English			?	September 1884	?	May/June 1885	Lancaster
RADM Samuel Rhoads Franklin			?	May/June 1885	20 July 1887	24 August 1887	Pensacola
RADM James A. Greer			?	1887	?	1889	?
Unknown?		?	?	1889	?	1893	?
RADM Henry Erben			June 1893	?	August 1894	?	Chicago
RADM William A. Kirkland			April 1894		November 1895		San Francisco
RADM Thomas O. Selfridge Jr.			November 1895		February 1898		Minneapolis
RADM John Adams Howell			January 1898		April 1898		?
The European Squadron returned to U.S. waters at the start of the Spanish–American War in April 1898, and did not return until July 1901.
RADM Bartlett J. Cromwell			?	July 1901	9 February 1902	9 February 1902	Chicago
CAPT Joseph E. Craig (Senior Officer Present)			?	9 February 1902	?	April 1902	?
RADM Arent S. Crowninshield			March 1902	30 April 1902	3 March 1903	20 March 1903	Illinois
CAPT James Henry Dayton (Senior Officer Present)			?	20 March 1903	?	28 April 1903	?
RADM Charles S. Cotton			?	28 April 1903	?	16 February 1904	Kearsarge (June–July 1903); Brooklyn
CAPT Harry Knox (Senior Officer Present)			?	16 February 1904	?	28 March 1904	Brooklyn
RADM Joseph Coghlan			?	?	?	20 April 1904	?
RADM Theodore Frelinghuysen Jewell			?	20 April 1904	?	?	Olympia
In 1905 the European Squadron was absorbed into the North Atlantic Fleet.
