= Dudley Newcomb Carpenter =

U.S. Navy officer and physician

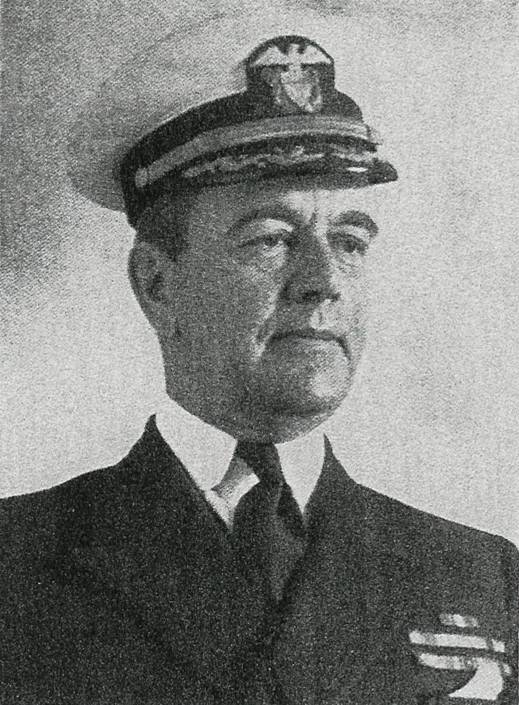
- Born: June 28, 1874; Kittery, Maine, U.S.
- Died: March 26, 1955 (aged 80); Bremerton, Washington, U.S.
- Burial place: United States Naval Academy Cemetery, Annapolis, Anne Arundel County, Maryland
- Relatives: Charles Carroll Carpenter (father)
- Military career
- Allegiance: United States of America
- Branch: United States Navy
- Service years: 1897–1946
- Rank: U.S. Naval Captain
- Units: USS Raleigh (C-8); USS Olympia (C-6); USS Callao (YFB-11)
- Commands: Naval Base Hospital No. 4 at Queenstown, Ireland in World War I Division of Planning and Publication at the Bureau of Medicine and Surgery from 1923 to 1927; United States Naval Academy Medical center
- Conflicts: Spanish–American War
- Other work: Writer

Dudley Newcomb Carpenter (June 28, 1874 – March 26, 1955) was a United States Navy officer and physician who participated in the Spanish–American War of 1898, and served through World War I and World War II. He established the first hospitals at Baguio, Philippines, Bas Obispo, Mexico and at Bremerton, Washington. He was also a writer.

== Family ==
Carpenter was fifth child and third son of Rear Admiral Charles Carroll Carpenter (1834–1899) and his wife Anna Brown (1842–19??). He was a descendant of the English immigrant William Carpenter who settled in Rehoboth, Massachusetts in 1644.

Carpenter was born in Kittery, Maine on June 28, 1874, and died in Bremerton, Washington on March 26, 1955. He was named after his paternal grandfather. He is buried in the United States Naval Academy Cemetery in Annapolis, Maryland.

== School ==
Carpenter graduated from Harvard Medical School with a medical degree in 1896. Then Carpenter then volunteered joining the U.S. Navy as an assistant surgeon.

== Career ==
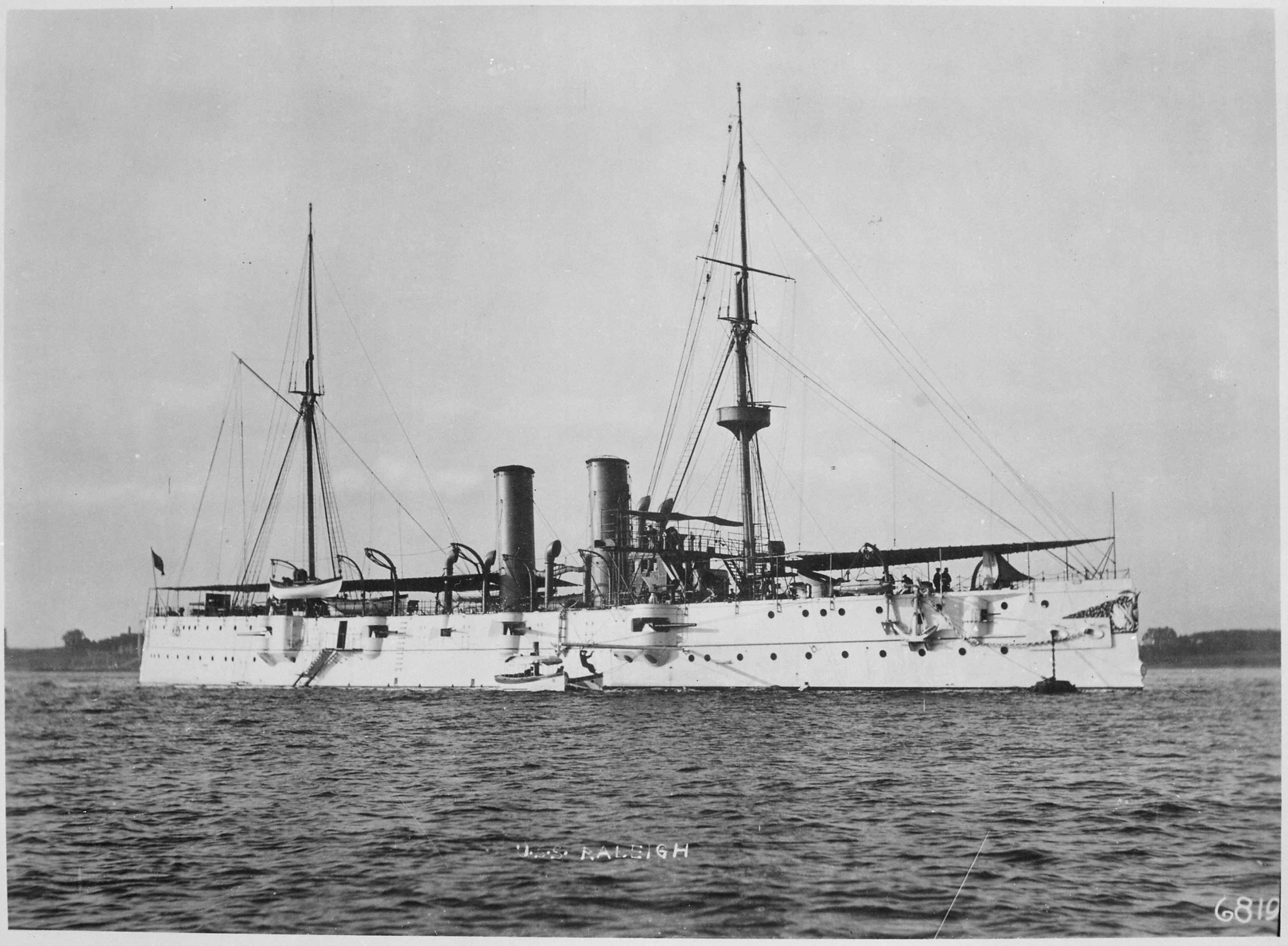
USS Raleigh (C-8) circa 1900.

Carpenter was commissioned as a Lieutenant, JG and assigned to the USS Raleigh, a United States Navy protected cruiser, as an assistant surgeon.

The USS Raleigh had just finished an overhaul at Norfolk and on May 6, 1897, she steamed eastward. Carpenter with the ship reported for duty on the European Station at Smyrna (now Izmir) on the Aegean Sea on June 7, 1897. In July, Carpenter and the officers and men participated in a good-will tour of Moroccan ports. By August, they were off Italy, then returned to the western Mediterranean. During this time period Carpenter learned military deportment and social skills. Through December, the ship operated off the Levant and toward the end of the month transited the Suez Canal en route to the Asiatic Station. On 18 February 1898, she reached Hong Kong where she joined Commodore James Dewey's Asiatic squadron.

== Spanish–American War ==
On 26 April 1898, the US Congress declared war against Spain. On April 27 the squadron got underway for Manila. Three days later, they passed El Fraile Island and was fired on by an enemy battery. With Concord and Boston, she returned the fire, then moved toward Cavite to engage the Spanish fleet. Carpenter's battle station was amidships in the enlisted mess room.

Carpenter's journal during this time period confuses some of the Spanish ships engaged and events. This indicates they were written soon after the battle. Carpenter wrote that the officers and crew saw the coming action as a "festive occasion, from their jokes and general good spirits." In a letter home to his mother, Carpenter reports he saw flashes of gunfire from Spanish guns and heard the "shrill, curdling whirr" of incoming shells. He also reported that his ship was lucky and injuries very minor during the action. Carpenter also says he rescued four firemen from heat exhaustion after they collapsed in the boiler room of the ship. On May 1, 1898, the American ships were steaming in column and the American squadron ran by the Spanish, firing at close range. Two hours later, five cross runs had been completed, and the Spanish fleet had been destroyed. Shore batteries became the targets. Just before noon on 1 May, USS Raleigh joined Olympia, Boston, and Petrel in silencing the navy yard and arsenal batteries. On 2 May, she sent officers ashore, including Lt. Carpenter, to demand the surrender of Corregidor and, on the 3rd, sent men to disable the batteries there and destroy the munitions. In the late afternoon, shore parties were sent to Palo Caballo for the same purpose. The ship then took up picket and patrol duties, capturing the gunboat Callao on the 12th.

In July, the USS Raleigh shifted from Manila Bay to Subic Bay. On the 7th, she shelled Spanish positions on Grande Island until they surrendered; she then sent garrison troops ashore. On the 10th, she returned to Manila, where she remained until after the Spanish surrendered the city in mid-August. Of the Spanish, Carpenter says they demonstrated admirable courage and possessed excellent weapons, but "they could not shoot straight" with them.

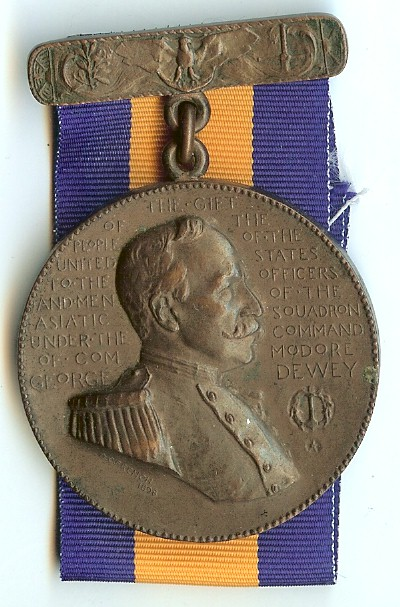
Dewey Medal

A special military decoration, the Battle of Manila Bay Medal (commonly called the Dewey Medal), was struck in honor of Dewey's victory at Manila Bay and awarded to every officer, Sailor and Marine present at the battle, including Dr. Carpenter. The medals were designed by Daniel Chester French and were produced by Tiffany's. Each medal was engraved with the recipient's ship, name and rank.

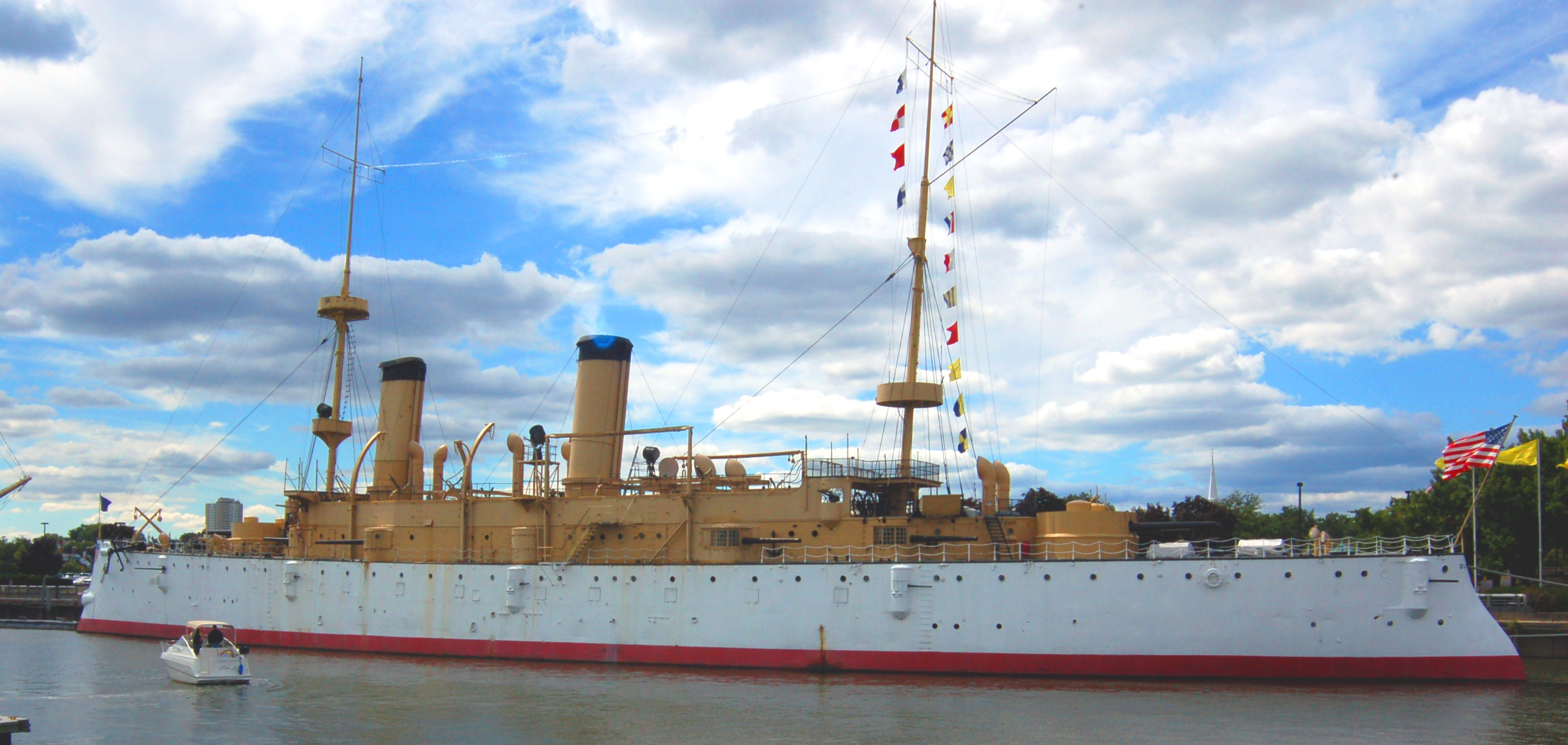
USS Olympia at the Independence Seaport Museum in 2007

Carpenter was transferred to the USS Olympia by June 1, 1898, when a group picture is taken of him with Rear Admiral George Dewey and other officers on the flagship.

Carpenter was aboard the USS Olympia when she returned to the Chinese coast on 20 May 1899. She remained there until the following month, when she departed for the U.S., via the Suez Canal and the Mediterranean Sea. The ship arrived in Boston on 10 October. Following the return of Olympia to the U.S., her officers and crews were feted and she was herself repainted and adorned with a gilded bow ornament. On 9 November, Olympia was decommissioned and placed in reserve.

On April 17, 1900, Carpenter wed Miss Sylvia Caesar, grand-niece to Cornelius Vanderbilt at St. James' Episcopal Church in New York City. Carpenter was cited as: "One of the finest looking, most sociable and brightest officers of his grade in the Navy."

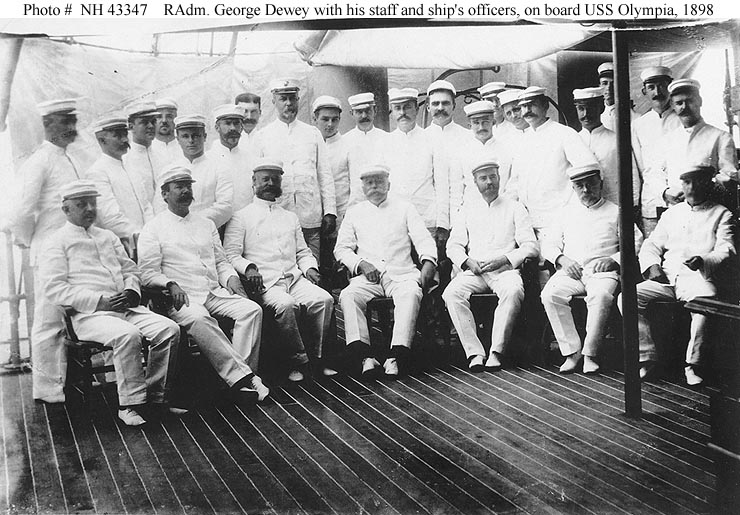
Photo#: NH 43347 – Rear Admiral George Dewey, center, Commander of the U.S. Asiatic Squadron, with officers of his flagship, USS Olympia (C-6), and his staff on board the Olympia in Manila Bay circa 20 May – 1 June 1898. Lt. Dudley Newcomb Carpenter, M.D. is standing third from the left.

== Later career ==
Carpenter decided to stay in the Navy after the war and was nominated and later confirmed after October 24, 1899, by President William McKinley during executive proceedings to the Senate.

In his Military Order of Foreign War notation, he is also listed as serving on the USS Callao probably as part of the prize crew on the former Spanish gunboat Callao in February 1899."

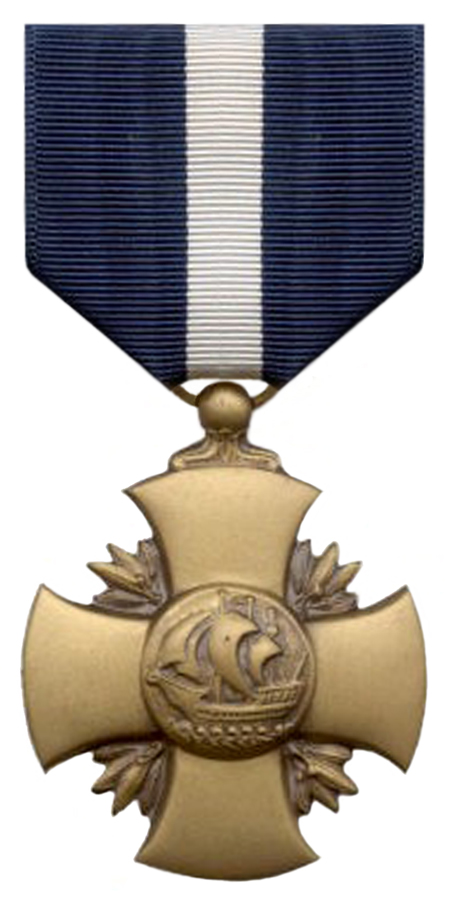
U.S. Navy medal called the Navy Cross

During World War I, Carpenter was awarded the Navy Cross while in Ireland. "The President of the United States of America takes pleasure in presenting the Navy Cross to Captain (MC) Dudley Newcomb Carpenter, United States Navy, for distinguished service in the line of his profession in establishing and maintaining Naval Base Hospital No. 4 at Queenstown, Ireland." Action Date: World War I Service: Navy Rank: Captain Division: Naval Base Hospital No. 4 (Queenstown, Ireland)

Carpenters later career is murky. What is known is documented via his journals and brief biographies. Dr. Carpenter helped establish the first hospitals at Baguio, Philippines and Bas Obispo, Mexico. He established a hospital out of a medical clinic at Bremerton, Washington. He served as the Reserve Fleet surgeon prior to and after World War I. He commanded the Division of Planning and Publication at the Bureau of Medicine and Surgery from 1923 to 1927. He also headed the medical department at the U. S. Naval Academy per the obit of his son, Donald.

Carpenter then retired from active service, but the exact date is not known. As is his activities there after. During World War II, he was recalled to duty and sat on the Medical Examining and Retiring Board until 1946.

== Writings ==
Carpenter apparently wrote pieces for the Naval Medical Bulletin. Two have been found entitled "Visit to the Chefoo, China, School for the Deaf," noted in the Association Review 9 (1907): 359–362; and "Gunshot Wounds as Seen in the Philippines," Medical News (6 August 1898): 174–176. Another is entitled: Duties of the Medical Department at "General Quarters."

== See also ==
- List of people from Maine
- List of people from Washington (state)
- List of people with surname Carpenter
