= Adam Harrington (basketball) =

American basketball player and coach (born 1980)

Phantom BC
- Title: Head coach
- League: Unrivaled

Personal information
- Born: July 5, 1980 (age 46) Bernardston, Massachusetts, U.S.
- Listed height: 6 ft 5 in (1.96 m)
- Listed weight: 200 lb (91 kg)

Career information
- High school: Pioneer Valley Regional (Northfield, Massachusetts)
- College: NC State (1998–1999); Auburn (2000–2002)
- NBA draft: 2002: undrafted
- Playing career: 2002–2010
- Position: Shooting guard
- Number: 21
- Coaching career: 2016–present

Career history

Playing
- 2002–2003: Dallas Mavericks
- 2003: Denver Nuggets
- 2003: Shaanxi Kylins
- 2004–2005: Columbus Riverdragons
- 2005: CB Gran Canaria
- 2006: Bnei Hasharon
- 2006: Cantabria Baloncesto
- 2006–2007: Brose Baskets
- 2007: KK Cedevita
- 2007–2008: Tulsa 66ers
- 2008–2009: Limoges CSP
- 2009: Springfield Armor
- 2010: SKK Kotwica Kołobrzeg

Coaching
- 2014–2015: Oklahoma City Thunder (shooting coach)
- 2016–2022: Brooklyn Nets (assistant)
- 2025: Phantom BC

Career highlights
- German League champion (2007); German Champions Cup champion (2007); Copa Toyota champion (2005); Third-team Parade All-American (1998)
- Stats at NBA.com
- Stats at Basketball Reference
Medals
Men's basketball
Representing United States
FIBA Americas U18 Championship
Gold medal – first place	1998 Puerto Plata	Team competition

Adam Philip Harrington (born July 5, 1980) is an American former professional basketball player and coach who is a head coach for Phantom BC of the Unrivaled basketball league. He previously served as an assistant coach and the director of player development for the Brooklyn Nets of the National Basketball Association (NBA). He played collegiately at Auburn University and North Carolina State University and professionally in the United States, various European countries, and China.

He is also the founder of the JEHH Memorial Fund.

== High school career ==
Harrington attended Pioneer Valley Regional School in Northfield, Massachusetts. Because his high school housed grades 7 through 12 in the same building, Harrington was able to play on the varsity basketball team in eighth grade. Harrington made an immediate impact, as a 13-year-old eighth grader, he hit four three-point baskets late in a game to lead his team to the Western Massachusetts Tournament Finals. By the time his career was finished Harrington recorded a total of 2,347 points scored, which is still the highest in Western Massachusetts for boys. He was a member of 3 Western Massachusetts sectional winners and two Massachusetts State Championship teams. Over his career his team record for games he played in was 96–7. Harrington was awarded the 1998 Gatorade Massachusetts High School Basketball boys Player of the Year, the 1998 USA Today Massachusetts Boys Basketball Player of the Year, he was named a Parade Magazine Third-Team All American and was ranked as the third best high school shooting guard, and overall 18th best player in the country. Harrington also participated in the Magic Johnson Roundball Classic in Detroit, MI as well as the Reebok Capital Classic in Washington DC. Harrington won a gold medal in 1998 with Team USA in Puerto Plata, Dominican Republic.

== College career ==
After a stellar high school career and interest from many of the nation's top college programs, Harrington signed a national letter of intent to play at North Carolina State University under then coach Herb Sendek. Harrington started the 1998–1999 season with the Wolfpack coming off the bench but by mid-season was a regular in the starting lineup. He ended the season as the team's leading scorer, averaging 11.6 points per game on a team that finished 19–14 and reached the NIT Tournament. Harrington was the first ever freshman in school history to lead the Wolfpack in scoring. Harrington was also named to the ACC All-Freshman Team. Harrington left N.C. State after his freshman season and transferred to Auburn University playing for coach Cliff Ellis. After sitting out the 1999–2000 season per NCAA regulations Harrington had a solid season with the Tigers in 2000–2001. He played in 31 games, starting 22 of them and averaged 15.5 points and 2.4 assists per game. He was named to the All-SEC Third Team. His numbers dropped a bit in the 2001–2002 season as he played in 28 games, starting only 15 of them, averaging 10.1 points per game. Harrington declared himself eligible for the 2002 NBA draft, leaving school after his junior season.

== Professional career ==
After being undrafted in the 2002 NBA Draft, Harrington played with the Cleveland Cavaliers in the NBA Summer League before signing a free agent contract with the Dallas Mavericks on October 1, 2002. He played in 13 games with the Mavericks, averaging 0.8 points per game. He was released by the Mavericks on January 7, 2003, and signed with the Denver Nuggets on March 23, 2003, and played with them for the remainder of the season, playing in 6 games and averaging 3.2 points per game. These stints with the Mavericks and Nuggets ended being Harrington's only days in the NBA. Having career totals of 30 points, 12 assists and 8 rebounds through 19 games.

Harrington's final NBA game was played on April 16, 2003, in a 84 - 89 loss to the Houston Rockets where he recorded 9 points, 3 rebounds and 3 assists.

During the 2003–2004 season Harrington started in veteran's camp with the Washington Wizards before being released and signing in China for the Shaanxi Kylins. He was there for a six-game stint before returning to the United States to play for the Columbus Riverdragons of the NBA Development League. He played in 17 games with the Riverdragons and averaged 11.2 points per game and would finish 3rd in the league in 3 Point Field Goal percentage and 9th in the league in Free Throw percentage.

Harrington then played the entire 2004–2005 season again with the Columbus Riverdragons. He played in 35 games and averaged 11.2 points per game and was in the top 10 in the league in every 3 point shooting category.

During the 2005–2006 season Harrington resumed again playing internationally, this time in Europe, beginning the season playing in Spain for CB Gran Canaria. In eight games he averaged 9.8 points per game. After being waived by Gran Canaria he was picked up by Bnei HaSharon in Israel and played 12 games with them averaging 18.6 points per game. He finished the season back in Spain with Cantabria Baloncesto and played in 3 games averaging 9.7 points per game. Harrington again spent the 2006–2007 season in Europe starting with the Brose Baskets in Germany. He averaged 7.1 points per game in 11 games before moving to Croatia to play for Cedevita Zagreb. Harrington had a great remainder to the season averaging 15.1 points per game in 11 games.

In 2007–2008 Harrington returned to the U.S. and again played in the NBA Developmental League for the Tulsa 66ers. He played in 41 games before a knee injury kept him out of the final games of the season. He started 32 of the 41 games and averaged 16 points per game. He also won the league's Inaugural 3-point Shooting Contest held in New Orleans as part of the D-League Dream Factory Friday Night skills competition. The contest was held in conjunction with the NBA's All Star weekend.

Harington returned to Europe for the 2008–2009 season and played for Limoges CSP Elite of France. He averaged 13.6 points per game before an ankle injury shortened his season to just 13 games. Before being hobbled by the injury, Harrington had been averaging 18.5 points per game. His averages took a significant hit, however, after the injury limited his playing time.

For the 2009–2010 season, Harrington was signed to an NBA Development League contract and was allocated to the Springfield Armor based on territorial rights, to be part of their inaugural campaign. Harrington would serve as somewhat of a hometown favorite, as he grew up only about 45 miles from Springfield. On January 6, 2010, it was announced that Harrington had left the Springfield Armor and signed with Kotwica Kołobrzeg of the Dominet Bank Ekstraliga in Poland. He finished the season with Kotwica, playing in their last 10 games of the season and averaging 9.8 points per game.

== Post-playing career ==
=== Oklahoma City Thunder (2014–2015) ===
On September 29, 2014, the Oklahoma City Thunder announced that Harrington was named shooting coach.

=== Brooklyn Nets (2016–2022) ===
On July 5, 2016, the Brooklyn Nets announced that Harrington was named assistant coach and director of player development.

=== Unrivaled (2025–present) ===
On November 15, 2024, Harrington was announced to be one of the six new head coaches of the Unrivaled basketball league.

== Career statistics ==
Legend
GP	Games played	GS	Games started	MPG	Minutes per game
FG%	Field goal percentage	3P%	3-point field goal percentage	FT%	Free throw percentage
RPG	Rebounds per game	APG	Assists per game	SPG	Steals per game
BPG	Blocks per game	PPG	Points per game	**Bold**	Career high

=== NBA Regular season ===
Year	Team	GP	GS	MPG	FG%	3P%	FT%	RPG	APG	SPG	BPG	PPG
2002–03	Dallas	**13**	0	2.8	.235	.333	**1.000**	.2	.2	.1	**.1**	.8
2002–03	Denver	6	0	12.3	**.350**	**.364**	.500	**1.0**	**1.7**	**.2**	-	**3.2**
Career		19	0	5.8	.297	.357	.750	.4	.6	.1	.1	1.6

=== College ===
Year	Team	GP	GS	MPG	FG%	3P%	FT%	RPG	APG	SPG	BPG	PPG
1998–99	NC State	**32**	**21**	24.6	.370	**.359**	**.785**	2.0	1.6	**1.2**	**.3**	11.6
1999–2000	Auburn	Transfer										
2000–01	Auburn	31	**21**	**29.9**	**.410**	.341	.713	**4.3**	**2.4**	1.1	.2	**15.5**
2001–02	Auburn	28	15	25.8	.456	.351	.696	3.5	1.5	1.2	.2	10.1
Career		91	57	26.8	.391	.350	.731	3.3	1.8	1.2	.2	12.5
