= Brad Baker =

Brad Baker may refer to:

- Brad Baker (baseball) (born 1980), American baseball pitcher
- Brad Baker (motorcyclist) (born 1993), American motorcycle racer
- Brad Baker (racing driver) (born 1974), American racing driver
