= William Dorrell =

William Dorrell may refer to:

- Billy Dorrell (1872–1953), English footballer
- William Dorrell (vegetarian) (1752–1846), American new religious leader of the Dorrellites
