= Bernardston, Massachusetts =

- Town
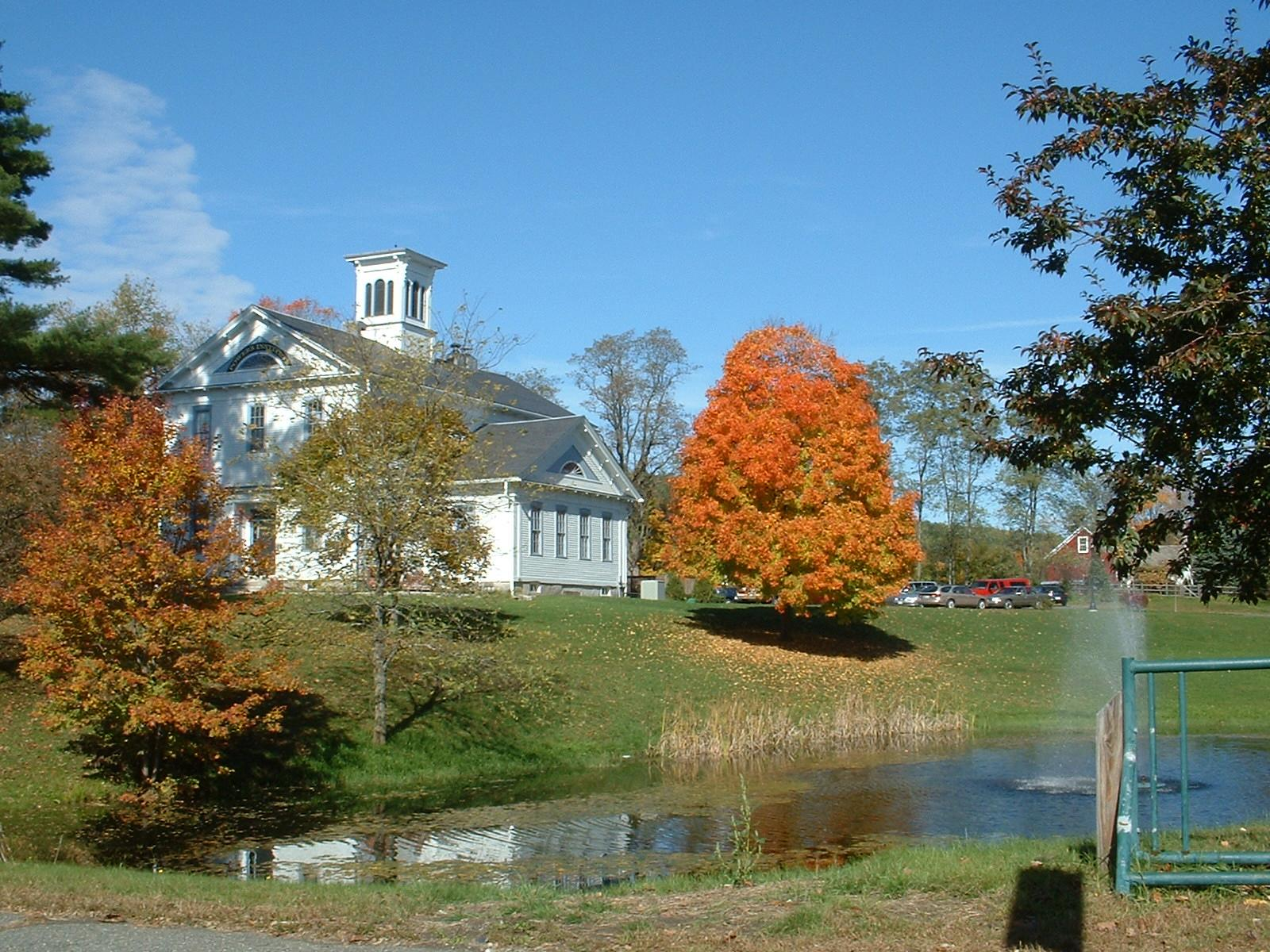
- The former Powers Institute, now the town's Historical Society

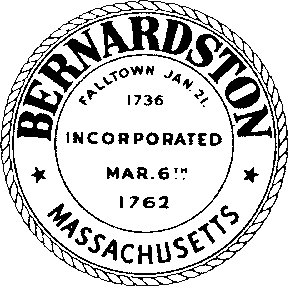
- Seal
- Nickname: Falltown
- Location in Franklin County in Massachusetts
- Coordinates: 42°40′15″N 72°33′00″W
- Country: United States
- State: Massachusetts
- County: Franklin
- Settled: 1738
- Incorporated: 1762

Government
  - Type: Open town meeting

Area
  - Total: 23.4 sq mi (60.6 km^{2})
  - Land: 23.4 sq mi (60.6 km^{2})
  - Water: 0 sq mi (0.0 km^{2})
- Elevation: 374 ft (114 m)

Population (2020)
  - Total: 2,102
  - Density: 89.8/sq mi (34.7/km^{2})
- Time zone: UTC−5 (Eastern)
  - Summer (DST): UTC−4 (Eastern)
- ZIP Code: 01337
- Area code: 413
- FIPS code: 25-05560
- GNIS feature ID: 0619378
- Website: townofbernardston.org

Bernardston (/ˈbɜːrnərdstən/) is a town in Franklin County, Massachusetts, United States. The population was 2,102 at the 2020 census. It is part of the Springfield, Massachusetts Metropolitan Statistical Area.

== History ==
=== Falls Fight Township ===
Bernardston, Massachusetts, initially known as Falls Fight Township, was a frontier settlement created by and for the families of soldiers who had fought in King Phillips War, specifically in the Battle of Turner's Falls, a major engagement under Captain Turner in 1676. Major John Burke was an early settler of the town, his father was one of the veterans granted land in Falls Fight, as was the son of Hope Atherton.

In November 1734, the following was presented to the General Court of Massachusetts:

A petition of Samuel Hunt, of Billerica, for himself and other survivors of the officers and soldiers that belonged to the company of Capt. Turner, and the representatives of them that are dead, shewing that the said company in 1676 engaged the Indian enemy at a place above Deerfield, and destroyed above three hundred of them, and, therefore, praying that this court would grant them a tract of land above Deerfield suitable to make a township.

The petition was granted and the proprietors of the new township began recruiting 60 families to settle in the town. John Burke, Samuel Connable, Lieut. Ebenezer Sheldon, and Deacon Sheldon built the first four houses, in 1738. They were of hewn logs, with port-holes in the walls for defense against the Indians.

== Pre-war frontier defenses ==
At his own expense, Burke built a stockade fort that stood "six rods on each side" (6 rods being about 100 feet). The stockade walls stood 12 feet high behind which the inhabitants in the vicinity repaired every night during the periods of Indian troubles. The fort contained eight homes, protecting the settlement during Indian attacks beginning in 1745 and later the French and Indian War.

In 1746 an attack was made on this fort by a large force of Indians, and, although there were in the fort only two men besides Maj. Burke, the Indians were beaten off with the loss of two of their number. At about the same time a band of Indians attempted to destroy Deacon Ebenezer Sheldon's house on Huckle Hill, but were routed by his father Lieut. Ebenezer Sheldon, who appeared on the scene with aid just in time. Lieut. Sheldon was famous as an Indian-fighter, and was known far and near as the "Old Indian-Hunter".

In 1747, Eliakim Sheldon, son of Lieut. Ebenezer Sheldon, was shot by the Indians while he was walking near his father's house.

== Bernardston named ==
Bernardston was originally part of the town of Colrain. Bernardston separated from Colrain and was officially incorporated in 1762, with the town of Leyden being separated from it in 1784 (it was not incorporated until 1809, however). Bernardston is named for Governor Francis Bernard, who was royal governor at the time of incorporation. In early maps of Massachusetts, Bernardston is shown as 'Bernard's Town'.

For much of the town's history, Bernardston has been an agricultural community, producing rye, corn, cider, and was one of the first communities to produce maple syrup. The town also has the unusual distinction of having once sent the largest animal ever to the New York meat markets, a 2,473-pound (1,122 kg) ox nicknamed "Constitution" or "Hero".

== Geography ==
According to the United States Census Bureau, the town has a total area of 23.4 square miles (61 km^{2}), all land. Bernardston lies along the northern state line, south of Windham County, Vermont. The town is bordered by Guilford and Vernon, Vermont, to the north, Northfield to the east, Gill to the southeast, Greenfield to the southwest, and Leyden to the west. The town center lies 7 miles (11 km) north-northeast of Greenfield, 43 miles (69 km) north of Springfield, and 89 miles (143 km) west-northwest of Boston.

Bernardston lies in the Pioneer Valley, on the edge of the Pocumtuck Range. Several mountains, including Wildcat Mountain, West Mountain, Bald Mountain, East Mountain and Pond Mountain, dot the landscape, on either side of the Fall River, a tributary of the nearby Connecticut River. Several other brooks flow through town as well. To the northeast, portions of the Satan's Kingdom Wildlife Management Area pass into the town, mostly around Pond Mountain.

Bernardston lies along the path of Interstate 91 and U.S. Route 5, both of which pass from Greenfield through town towards the Vermont state line. Bernardston is the northernmost town along both I-91 and U.S. 5 in Massachusetts, which then both cross into Vermont. Massachusetts Route 10 leaves its concurrency with Route 5 in the southern part of town, before passing eastward towards the Connecticut River and New Hampshire. The town also lies along the north-south portion of the Springfield Terminal railway, which roughly follows the path of Route 10. The nearest regional bus service is in Greenfield, with the nearest general aviation airport in Montague. The nearest Amtrak station is in Greenfield, and the nearest national air service is at Bradley International Airport in Windsor Locks, Connecticut.

== Demographics ==
Historical population
Year	Pop.	±%
1790	691	—
1840	924	+33.7%
1850	937	+1.4%
1860	968	+3.3%
1870	961	−0.7%
1880	934	−2.8%
1890	770	−17.6%
1900	792	+2.9%
1910	741	−6.4%
1920	769	+3.8%
1930	893	+16.1%
1940	954	+6.8%
1950	1,117	+17.1%
1960	1,370	+22.6%
1970	1,659	+21.1%
1980	1,750	+5.5%
1990	2,048	+17.0%
2000	2,155	+5.2%
2010	2,129	−1.2%
2020	2,102	−1.3%
2022	2,104	+0.1%
Source: United States census records and Population Estimates Program data.

As of the census of 2000, there were 2,155 people, 848 households, and 603 families residing in the town. By population, Bernardston ranked seventh of the twenty-six cities and towns in Franklin County, and 287th of the 351 cities and towns in Massachusetts. The population density was 92.0 inhabitants per square mile (35.5/km^{2}), which ranked ninth in the county and 289th in the Commonwealth. There were 879 housing units at an average density of 37.5 per square mile (14.5/km^{2}). The racial makeup of the town was 99.03% White, 0.09% African American, 0.05% Pacific Islander, 0.19% from other races, and 0.65% from two or more races. Hispanic or Latino of any race were 0.46% of the population.

There were 848 households, out of which 31.5% had children under the age of 18 living with them, 58.4% were married couples living together, 9.6% had a female householder with no husband present, and 28.8% were non-families. Of all households, 22.1% were made up of individuals, and 10.4% had someone living alone who was 65 years of age or older. The average household size was 2.52 and the average family size was 2.95.

In the town, the population was spread out, with 22.9% under the age of 18, 5.9% from 18 to 24, 26.9% from 25 to 44, 28.1% from 45 to 64, and 16.2% who were 65 years of age or older. The median age was 42 years. For every 100 females, there were 95.9 males. For every 100 females age 18 and over, there were 92.1 males.

The median income for a household in the town was $45,259, and the median income for a family was $53,125. Males had a median income of $35,071 versus $22,377 for females. The per capita income for the town was $20,959. About 2.8% of families and 4.4% of the population were below the poverty line, including 3.0% of those under age 18 and 6.6% of those age 65 or over.

== Government ==
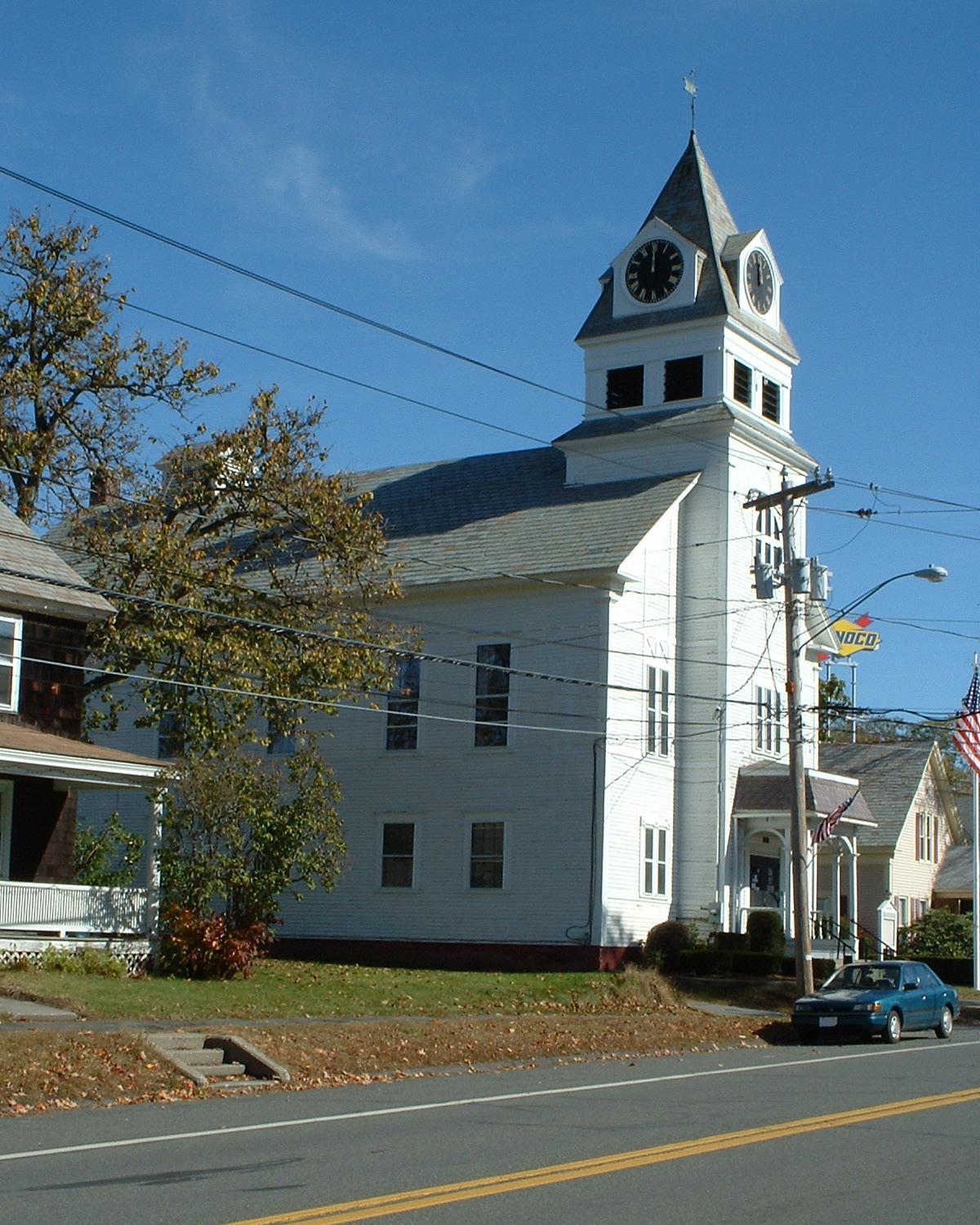
Bernardston Town Hall

Bernardston employs the open town meeting form of government, and is led by a board of selectmen and an administrative assistant. Bernardston has its own police, fire and public works departments, as well as a post office and the Cushman Library, which is connected to the regional library network. The nearest hospital, Franklin Medical Center, is located in Greenfield, as are most of the nearest state offices.

On the state level, Bernardston is represented in the Massachusetts House of Representatives as part of the Second Berkshire district, represented by Paul Mark, which covers central Berkshire County, as well as portions of Hampshire and Franklin Counties. In the Massachusetts Senate, the town is in the Hampshire, Franklin and Worcester district, represented by Jo Comerford, which includes most of eastern Franklin County and much of eastern Hampshire County. The town is patrolled by the Second (Shelburne Falls) Station of Troop "B" of the Massachusetts State Police.

On the national level, Bernardston is represented in the United States House of Representatives as part of Massachusetts's 1st congressional district, and has been represented by Richard Neal of Springfield since 2012. Massachusetts is currently represented in the United States Senate by Senator Edward Markey and Senator Elizabeth Warren.

== Education ==
Bernardston is a member of the Pioneer Valley Regional School District, which includes several northern border towns to the east. The district is essentially operated in two portions; the towns each have their own semi-independent elementary schools, with students attending Pioneer Valley Regional School in Northfield from seventh through twelfth grades. Students in Bernardston attend the Bernardston Elementary School from pre-kindergarten through sixth grade. The Full Circle School, a naturalistic-based school for students preschool to sixth grade, is located in the town on Parmenter Road.

== Notable people ==
- Samuel Clesson Allen (1772–1842), United States Congressman from Massachusetts, Congregationalist minister
- Lou Barlow, musician and member of Deep Wound, Dinosaur Jr, Sebadoh, Folk Implosion, and Sentidoh
- Bryant B. Brooks (1861–1944), Wyoming Territory cattle rancher, politician, Governor of Wyoming 1905–1911, 2018 inductee of the Wyoming Cowboy Hall of Fame
- Jean Brooks Greenleaf (1832–1918), woman suffragist
- Adam Harrington, professional basketball player

== See also ==
- Adamsville
- Bernardston Congregational Unitarian Church, which is on the National Register of Historic Places
- Halifax
- Shelburne
