= Pioneer Valley Regional School =

Coordinates: 42.6835216°N 72.4857444°W

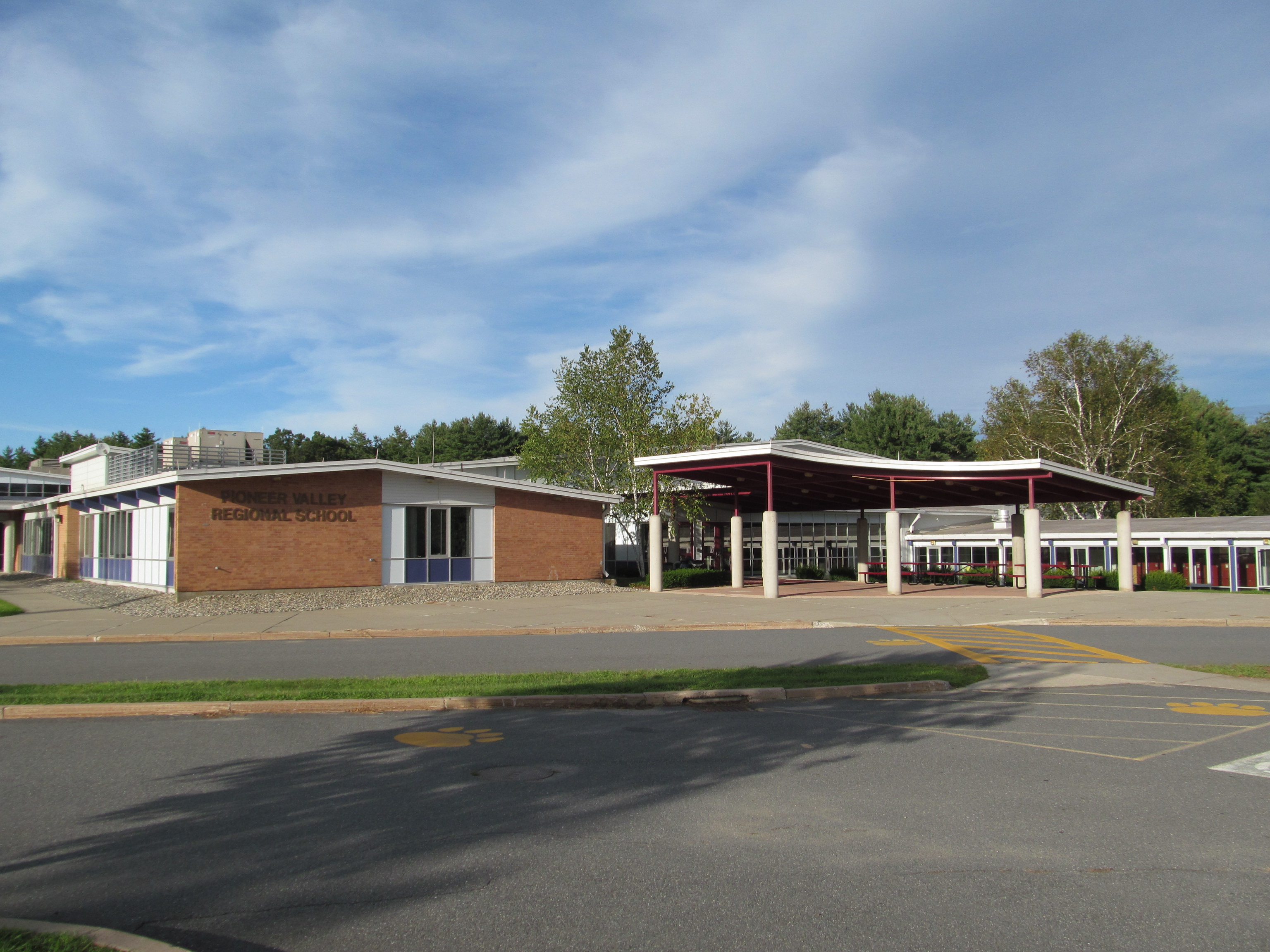
- Pioneer Valley Regional School

Location
- 97 F Sumner Turner Road; Northfield, Massachusetts 01360; United States

Information
- Type: Public secondary Open enrollment
- Motto: "Through the halls of Pioneer walk the finest students and faculty in the world"
- Established: 1969
- Founder: Doctor Jack A. Seaman I
- School district: Pioneer Valley Regional School District
- NCES District ID: 2509600
- Superintendent: Patricia Kinsella
- NCES School ID: 250960001515
- Principal: Anne Scanlan-Emigh
- Grades: 7–12
- Enrollment: 241 (2023-2024)
- Student to teacher ratio: 10.20
- Language: English
- Schedule type: Rotating block scheduling
- Hours in school day: 6.5
- Campus type: Rural
- Colors: Black and Gold
- Slogan: "Go Panthers!"
- Song: "The Washington Post March"
- Athletics: Yes
- Sports: Yes
- Mascot: Black Panther
- Team name: Pioneer Panthers
- Newspaper: The Panther Press
- Budget: $4.2M
- Communities served: Northfield, Bernardston, Leyden Warwick Vernon
- Feeder schools: Northfield Elementary School, Bernardston Elementary School, Vernon Elementary School
- Website: Pioneer Valley Regional School

Pioneer Valley Regional School is a public regional comprehensive secondary school located in Northfield, Massachusetts, United States. It offers grades seven through twelve. It is the primary high school for the towns of Leyden, Northfield, Warwick and Bernardston, Massachusetts. It is also an alternative for students from the neighboring town of Vernon, Vermont. The school was founded in 1957.

== History ==
The Pioneer Valley School District was formed in 1991 following an agreement by the four towns involved: Leyden, Northfield, Warwick, and Bernardston. All four elementary schools fed into Pioneer until the closure of Leyden and Warwick elementary schools.

A second expansion was made in 1992, expanding the high school portion and overhauling the auditorium.

== Governance ==
Since the formation of the Pioneer Valley Regional School District, Pioneer Valley Regional School has fallen under the jurisdiction of the district's twelve-member school committee, made up of three members from each of the four towns. Though students from Vernon, Vermont are allowed to attend Pioneer, Vernon has no seat at the committee.

== Notable alumni ==
- Brad Baker, former professional baseball player
- Adam Harrington, former professional basketball player and coach
