= Bernardston Congregational Unitarian Church =

Historic church in Massachusetts, United States

- U.S. National Register of Historic Places
- Bernardston Congregational Unitarian Church

- Location within Massachusetts Location within the United States
- Location: 49 Church St., Bernardston, Massachusetts
- Coordinates: 42°40′14″N 72°33′0″W
- Area: less than one acre
- Built: 1739
- Architect: Connable, Samuel Jr. & Sr.; Couch, James et al.
- Architectural style: Greek Revival
- NRHP reference No.: 93000128
- Added to NRHP: March 18, 1993

The Bernardston Congregational Unitarian Church is a historic church building at 49 Church Street in Bernardston, Massachusetts. The church is notable for the history of construction, movement, and reconstruction, since it was first erected in 1739, just two years after Bernardston was settled. It was added to the National Register of Historic Places in 1993. Its congregation is affiliated with the Unitarian Universalist Association which was established in 1820.

== Architecture and building history ==
Located in the town's village center, at the southeast corner of Church and Depot Streets, it features a two-story wood-frame structure, with a gabled roof and clapboarded exterior. Its architectural style is Greek Revival, featuring corner pilasters rising to an entablature and fully pedimented gables. An entry pavilion with similar features projects slightly from the main block. A square tower rises above the roof ridge, with a plain first stage and two octagonal stages of decreasing size above it, capped by a bellcast cupola and weathervane. The interior—originally a single story with gallery—is now two stories, with the sanctuary on the upper level and vestry and office spaces on the ground floor. The sanctuary's earliest documented organization included box pews and a high pulpit; these were removed during 19th-century alterations.

The church began as an early colonial meeting house, located on Huckle Hill, near the town's early residential concentration. It was moved 0.5 miles (0.80 km) in 1772 on capstans and rollers using human power. In 1791 it was moved again, this time by disassembly and reconstruction, to a location on Bald Mountain Road. It was moved a third time in 1825, again by disassembly, to its present location. It was significantly altered in 1846, which it acquired its Greek Revival features and its belfry. The congregation began as a traditional Congregationalist community, which became Unitarian in the early 19th century; its more traditional Trinitarians split off to form the present Congregational group in 1824.

== See also ==
- National Register of Historic Places listings in Franklin County, Massachusetts
