= Leyden, Massachusetts =

- Town
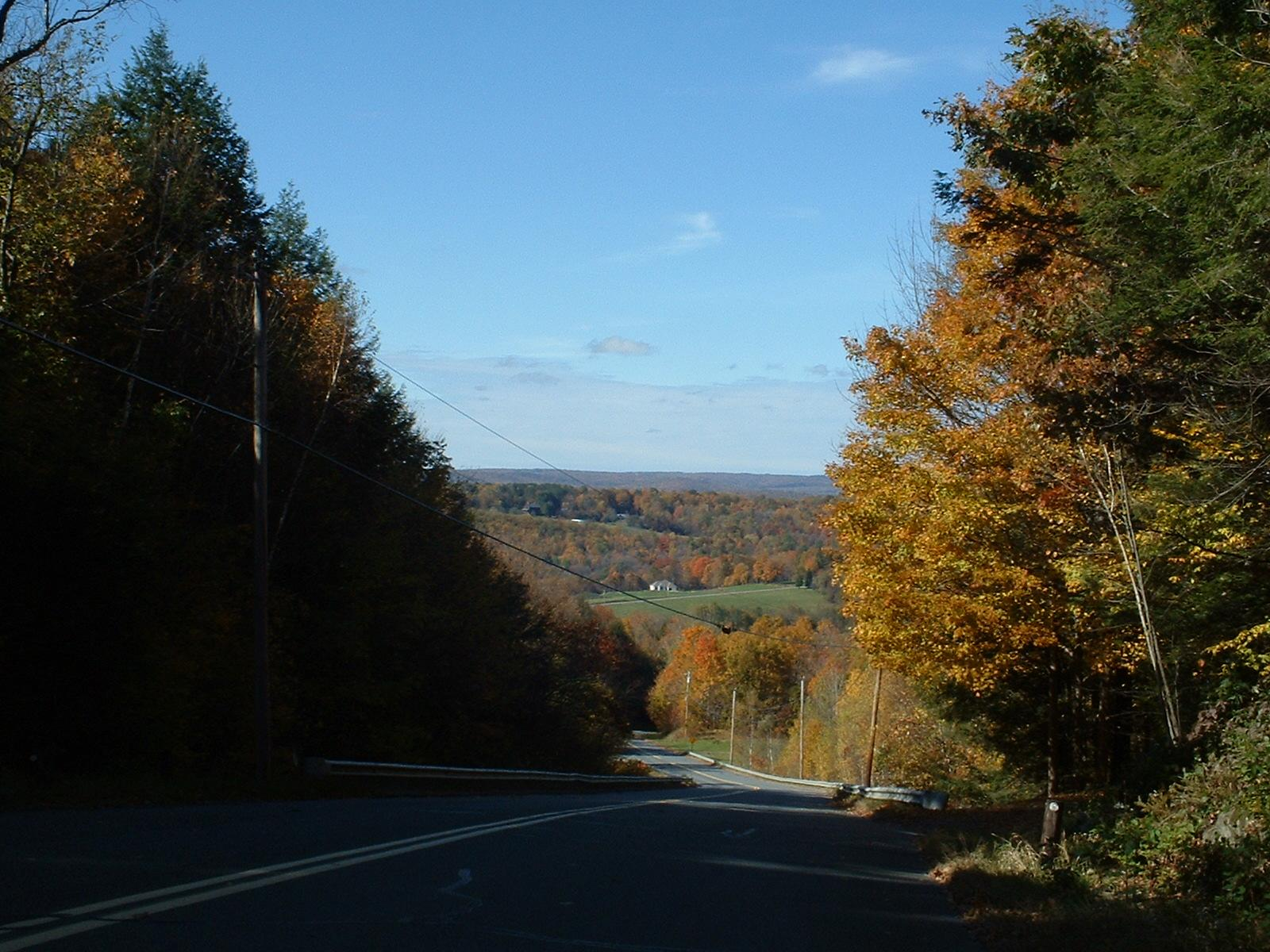
- Frizzell Hill, looking west towards the town center

- Seal

- Location in Franklin County in Massachusetts
- Coordinates: 42°42′00″N 72°37′48″W
- Country: United States
- State: Massachusetts
- County: Franklin
- Settled: 1738
- Incorporated: 1809

Government
  - Type: Open town meeting

Area
  - Total: 18.0 sq mi (46.7 km^{2})
  - Land: 17.9 sq mi (46.4 km^{2})
  - Water: 0.12 sq mi (0.3 km^{2})
- Elevation: 928 ft (283 m)

Population (2020)
  - Total: 734
  - Density: 41.0/sq mi (15.8/km^{2})
- Time zone: UTC−5 (Eastern)
  - Summer (DST): UTC−4 (Eastern)
- ZIP Codes: 01337 (Leyden); 01301 (Greenfield)
- Area code: 413
- FIPS code: 25-35285
- GNIS feature ID: 0618169
- Website: www.townofleyden.com

Leyden is a town in Franklin County, Massachusetts, United States. The population was 734 at the 2020 census. It is part of the Springfield, Massachusetts Metropolitan Statistical Area.

== History ==
Immediately prior to English settlement, the area was occupied by the Wabanaki people. English colonists first settled in Leyden in 1737 as part of "Fall Town", which also included Bernardston and Colrain. The town was set off from Bernardston in 1784, but it was not incorporated as a town until February 22, 1809. The town was named for the city of Leiden, Netherlands, refuge of the Pilgrims before colonizing the Americas. Leyden had several small industries in the eighteenth century, including grist mills, wood product mills, and dairying, but today the largest industry is maple sugar production. The town also has a reservoir which supplies the town of Greenfield. The Dorrellites, a utopian sect founded and led by William Dorrell, was active in Leyden in the 1790s. The Brotherhood of the Spirit commune was founded in Leyden in 1968.

== Geography ==
According to the United States Census Bureau, the town has a total area of 18.0 square miles (46.7 km^{2}), of which 17.9 square miles (46.4 km^{2}) is land and 0.12 square miles (0.3 km^{2}), or 0.66%, is water. Leyden lies on the northern Massachusetts border, south of Windham County, Vermont. The town is bordered by Guilford, Vermont, to the north, Bernardston to the east, Greenfield to the south, and Colrain to the west. The town center lies 9 miles (14 km) north of Greenfield, 47 miles (76 km) north of Springfield, and 96 miles (154 km) west-northwest of Boston.

Leyden lies along the eastern edge of the Berkshires, with the town mostly lying along the valleys of the Green River (which also forms the western border) and the branches of Glen Brook. The majority of the town away from the brooks is forested, and the town has a small state forest and a wildlife management area within its borders. The confluence of the main and east branches of Glen Brook is dammed to form the Greenfield Reservoir, before the brook flows southward into Greenfield and meets the Green River.

Leyden is one of only a handful of towns in Massachusetts which does not have any state routes (nearly half of such towns are on the islands of Nantucket, Martha's Vineyard and the Elizabeth Islands). There are state routes, U.S. routes and interstates in the neighboring towns, with Interstate 91 passing to the south and east of town. The nearest bus and passenger train service is in Greenfield, and the nearest small air service in Turners Falls. The nearest national air service is at Bradley International Airport in Windsor Locks, Connecticut.

== Demographics ==
Historical population
Year	Pop.	±%
1790	989	—
1840	646	−34.7%
1850	716	+10.8%
1860	606	−15.4%
1870	518	−14.5%
1880	507	−2.1%
1890	407	−19.7%
1900	379	−6.9%
1910	363	−4.2%
1920	330	−9.1%
1930	261	−20.9%
1940	260	−0.4%
1950	306	+17.7%
1960	343	+12.1%
1970	376	+9.6%
1980	498	+32.4%
1990	662	+32.9%
2000	772	+16.6%
2010	711	−7.9%
2020	734	+3.2%
2024*	735	+0.1%
* = population estimate. Source: United States census records and Population Estimates Program data.

As of the census of 2000, there were 772 people, 277 households, and 219 families residing in the town. By population, Leyden ranked 22nd out of the 26 towns in Franklin County, and 333rd out of 351 cities and towns in Massachusetts. The population density was 42.9 inhabitants per square mile (16.6/km^{2}), which ranked 18th in the county and 316th in the Commonwealth. There were 306 housing units at an average density of 17.0 per square mile (6.6/km^{2}). The racial makeup of the town was 98.45% White, 0.39% African American, 0.26% Native American, 0.13% Asian, and 0.78% from two or more races. Hispanic or Latino of any race were 0.26% of the population.

There were 277 households, out of which 37.5% had children under the age of 18 living with them, 68.2% were married couples living together, 6.1% had a female householder with no husband present, and 20.6% were non-families. Of all households, 16.2% were made up of individuals, and 4.7% had someone living alone who was 65 years of age or older. The average household size was 2.78 and the average family size was 3.08.

In the town, the population was spread out, with 26.9% under the age of 18, 6.1% from 18 to 24, 28.5% from 25 to 44, 30.7% from 45 to 64, and 7.8% who were 65 years of age or older. The median age was 40 years. For every 100 females, there were 102.1 males. For every 100 females age 18 and over, there were 102.2 males.

The median income for a household in the town was $50,385, and the median income for a family was $53,750. Males had a median income of $40,192 versus $29,659 for females. The per capita income for the town was $26,076. About 3.4% of families and 4.7% of the population were below the poverty line, including 7.7% of those under age 18 and 3.0% of those age 65 or over.

== Government ==
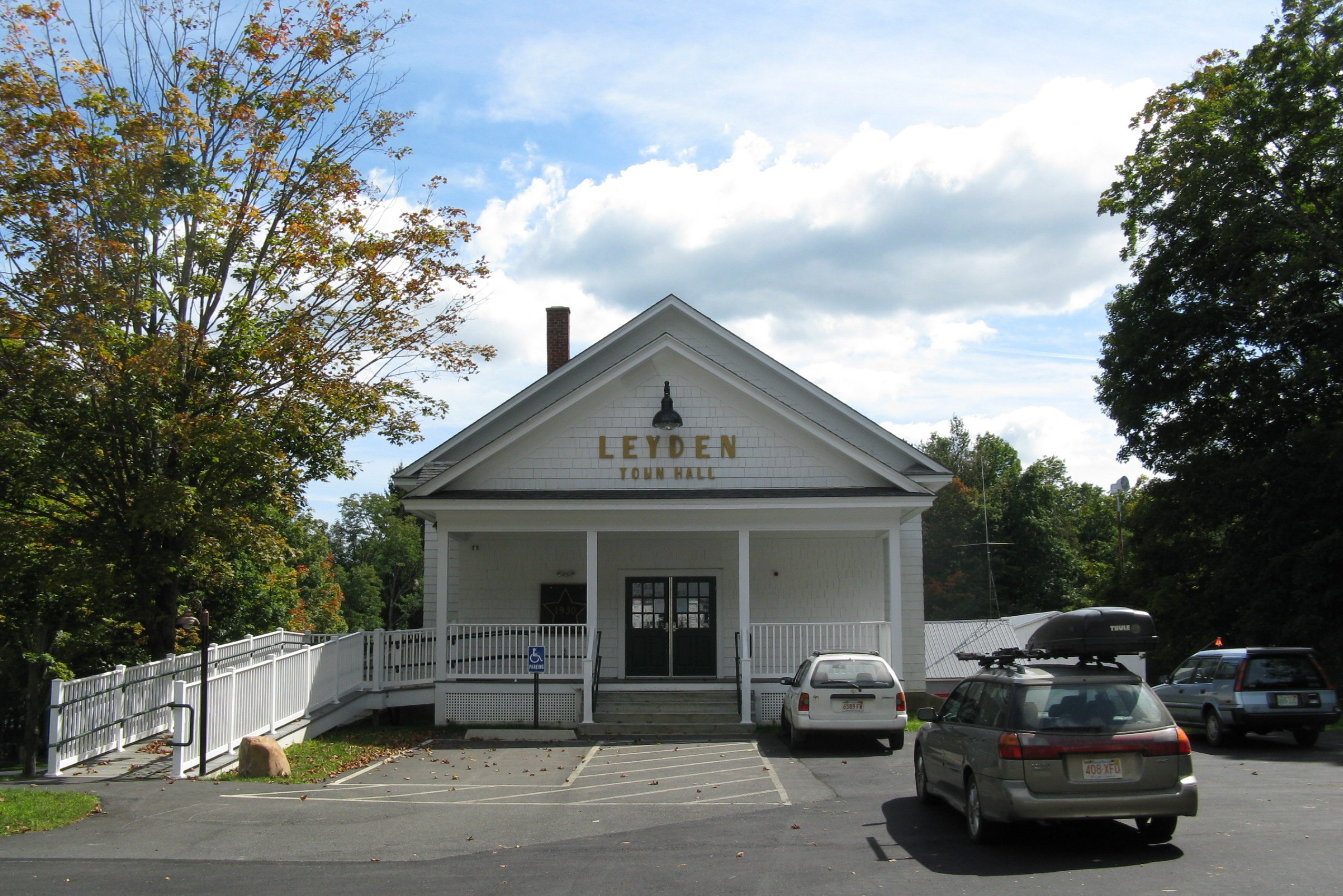
Leyden Town Hall

Leyden employs the open town meeting form of government, and is led by a board of selectmen and an administrative assistant. Leyden has its own fire department as well as a library connected to the regional library network. Police services are provided by Bernardston Police Department. The nearest hospital, Franklin Medical Center, is in neighboring Greenfield, as are most of the nearest state services.

After redistricting in 2023, Leyden is represented in the Massachusetts House of Representatives as part of the First Franklin district, represented by Natalie Blais. In the Massachusetts Senate, the town is part of the Hampshire, Franklin and Worcester district, represented by Joanne Comerford. Leyden is part of the Eighth Massachusetts Governor's Council district and is represented by Tara Jacobs. The town is patrolled by the Second (Shelburne Falls) Station of Troop "B" of the Massachusetts State Police.

On the national level, Leyden is represented in the United States House of Representatives as part of Massachusetts's 1st congressional district, by Richard Neal. John Olver of Amherst who represented the town in the House from June 1991 to January 2013, retired when redistricting placed him and Rep. Neal in the same district. Massachusetts is represented in the United States Senate by senior Senator Elizabeth Warren (D) and junior Senator Ed Markey (D), who won a special election in June 2013 to fill the seat vacated by Secretary of State John Kerry.

== Education ==
Leyden is a member of the Pioneer Valley Regional School District, which includes several northern border towns to the east. The district is essentially operated in two portions; the towns each have their own semi-independent elementary schools, with students attending Pioneer Valley Regional School in Northfield from seventh through twelfth grades. As of 2019, Pearl Rhodes Elementary School has been closed. Students now attend Bernardston Elementary School for K–6. There are private, parochial and charter schools in Greenfield and other nearby communities, with the most prominent private school being Deerfield Academy in nearby Deerfield.

The nearest community college, Greenfield Community College, is located in Greenfield. The nearest state college is Massachusetts College of Liberal Arts in North Adams, and the nearest state university is the University of Massachusetts Amherst. The nearest private colleges, including members of the Five Colleges and Seven Sisters, are located southeast in the Northampton area.

== Notable people ==
- Henry Kirke Brown (1814–1886), sculptor, most notably for the equestrian statues of Winfield Scott in Scott Circle, Washington, D.C., and George Washington at Union Square in New York City
- Charles C. Carpenter (1834–1899), United States Navy rear admiral, rose to command of the Asiatic Squadron
- Charles N. Davenport (1830–1882), Vermont attorney and politician
- John Leonard Riddell (1807–1865), noted scientist, author and politician, developed the first practical binocular microscope and was melter and refiner at the New Orleans Mint during the American Civil War
