= Francis M. Bunce =

U.S. Navy rear admiral

Francis Marvin Bunce
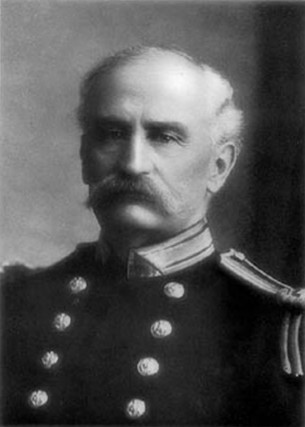
- Born: 25 December 1836; Hartford, Connecticut, US
- Died: 19 October 1901 (aged 64); Hartford, Connecticut, US
- Burial place: Cedar Hill Cemetery, Hartford, Connecticut
- Military career
- Allegiance: United States
- Branch: United States Navy
- Service years: 1852–1898
- Rank: Rear admiral
- Commands: SS Robert Bruce (prize master); USS Weehawken; USS Lehigh; USS Dictator; USS Monadnock; USS Nantasket; USS Ashuelot; USS Marion; USS Wabash; USS Atlanta; Naval Station New London; USS Richmond / Training Station Newport; North Atlantic Squadron; New York Navy Yard
- Conflicts: American Civil War Union blockade Peninsula Campaign Second Battle of Fort Wagner Siege of Charleston Second Battle of Fort Sumter; Spanish–American War

Signature
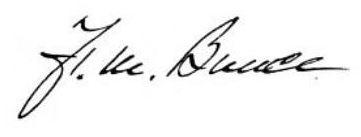

Francis M. Bunce (25 December 1836 – 19 October 1901) was a rear admiral of the United States Navy who distinguished himself as a junior officer during the American Civil War (1861–1865). He was in command of the North Atlantic Squadron from 1895 to 1897, and while serving as its commander-in-chief played an important role in developing the squadron's – and more broadly the U.S. Navy's – capability to operate its ships in cohesive tactical naval formations, preparing it for its performance in the Spanish–American War in 1898.

== Early life ==
Bunce was born in Hartford, Connecticut, on 25 December 1836.

== Naval career ==
=== Early career ===
Bunce was appointed an acting midshipman on 28 May 1852 and attended the United States Naval Academy in Annapolis, Maryland, from which he graduated on 10 June 1857. He was warranted to the rank of midshipman the same day. His first assignment was to the sloop-of-war USS Germantown in the East India Squadron from 1857 to 1860. Promoted to passed midshipman on 25 June 1860, he reported aboard the sloop-of-war USS Brooklyn, which was engaged in supporting a scientific expedition surveying a route across the Isthmus of Panama in the Chiriquí area. He was promoted to master on 24 October 1860 and to lieutenant on 11 April 1861.

=== American Civil War ===
The American Civil War broke out on 12 April 1861, the day after Bunce's promotion to lieutenant. On 7 January 1862, he transferred to the frigate USS Macedonian of the Gulf Squadron, involved in enforcing the Union blockade of the Confederate States of America. He soon became the executive officer of the gunboat USS Penobscot, and was aboard her for an 1862 engagement with Confederate artillery at Yorktown, Virginia. Detaching from Penobscot, he was attached temporarily to the United States Army and took charge of the disembarkation of heavy artillery and mortars for use by the Army of the Potomac in the April–May 1862 Siege of Yorktown during the Peninsula Campaign.

Bunce returned to Penobscot, which then moved to Wilmington, North Carolina, to participate in the blockade of the port there. While off Wilmington, Penobscot exchanged fire with Fort Fisher and with Confederate artillery batteries around Fort Caswell. Bunce disembarked from Penobscot to command a group of boats that made a successful expedition up the Little River, destroying several schooners, an extensive salt works, and large amounts of cotton, turpentine, and resin. After Bunce returned to Penobscot, Penobscot captured the blockade runner Robert Bruce, and Bunce went aboard Robert Bruce as prize master and commanded her on her voyage to New York City, where she arrived on 1 November 1862.

After detaching from Penobscot, Bunce became executive officer of the sloop-of-war USS Pawnee, then refitting at Philadelphia. He remained aboard Pawnee after her refit was completed as she joined the South Atlantic Blockading Squadron off Stono River, South Carolina. Promoted to lieutenant commander on 10 January 1863 while aboard Pawnee, he oversaw the sounding, buoying, and removal of obstructions that winter in interior channels between Stono River and Morris Island in the outer reaches of Charleston Harbor. He then became aide to Brigadier General Quincy A. Gillmore and took charge of the disembarkation of the five regiments of Brigadier General George C. Strong's brigade through the channels he had cleared. Bunce commanded the naval portion of the attack on Morris Island that resulted in its capture except for its northern tip, which was controlled by Confederate Fort Wagner. For his actions at Morris Island he received an honorable mention in the report on the action of Commander George Balch and Rear Admiral John A. Dahlgren to the United States Department of the Navy.

Bunce then left Pawnee and reported aboard the monitor USS Patapsco. While aboard Patapsco, Bunce took part in her many exchanges of gunfire with Confederate forces during the siege of Charleston in 1863. On the night of 8–9 September 1863, he participated in a night boat attack on Fort Sumter by a force of U.S. Navy and United States Marine Corps personnel under the overall command of Patapsco's commanding officer, Commander Thomas H. Stevens, Jr.; although the attack was a fiasco, Stevens gave Bunce an honorable mention in his report on the attack. In November 1863, Bunce suffered injuries when a cartridge detonated prematurely in a gun turret aboard Patapsco while she was in action against Confederate forces. As a result, he was detached from Patapsco and ordered to the steam screw frigate USS Wabash to convalesce. He reported aboard the monitor USS Catskill for temporary duty on 8 December 1863, but returned to Wabash on 7 January 1864.

In January 1864, Bunce received another temporary assignment, this time to command the monitor USS Weehawken, then returned to Wabash. He then was assigned to the staff of Rear Admiral Dahlgren, the commander of the South Atlantic Blockading Squadron, serving as "Chief of Scouts" and in command of the picket boat line until 6 April 1864, when he took command of the monitor USS Lehigh. On 14 May 1864, he was detached from the South Atlantic Blockading Squadron and ordered north, and on 26 September 1864 he reported aboard the monitor USS Dictator under the command of Commodore John Rodgers. Dictator cruised off the United States East Coast from December 1864 through the end of the American Civil War in April 1865 and until decommissioning on 5 September 1865.

=== Post-Civil War ===
On 5 September 1865, Bunce took command of the monitor USS Monadnock. He commanded her during her voyage from Philadelphia, Pennsylvania, around Cape Horn to San Francisco, California, the first extended sea voyage ever made by a monitor. This impressive achievement earned him the thanks of the Department of the Navy upon the recommendation of Commodore Rodgers, and the United States Secretary of the Navy, Gideon Welles, in turn recommended him for reward to President Andrew Johnson.

After service at the Boston Navy Yard in Charlestown, Massachusetts, from 1866 to 1869, Bunce reported back aboard Dictator in April 1869 to fit her for sea service. With this completed, he detached from Dictator on 4 October 1869 and on 12 November 1869 took command of the newly commissioned North Atlantic Squadron screw steamer USS Nantasket, stationed at Samaná Bay, Santo Domingo. He detached from her on 20 July 1870, and then had special ordnance duty at Pittsburgh, Pennsylvania, and was promoted to commander on 7 November 1871. In 1873 he took command of the gunboat USS Ashuelot in the Asiatic Squadron. He reported to the Washington Navy Yard in Washington, D.C., in June 1875, but was detached for lighthouse duty from July to October 1875. He returned to the Washington Navy Yard in 1877, then served at the Torpedo School at Newport, Rhode Island, from 7 January 1879 to 29 July 1881.

Bunce returned to sea in 1881 as commanding officer of the sloop-of-war USS Marion. From 1882 to 1885, he commanded USS Wabash, which by then served as a receiving ship at the Boston Navy Yard. While aboard Wabash, he received a promotion to captain on 11 January 1883. After service as the Senior Member of the Board on Timber Preservation for Naval Purposes, he became the first commanding officer of the new protected cruiser USS Atlanta on 1 June 1886, just a few weeks prior to her commissioning on 19 July 1886. He remained in command of Atlanta until 1 December 1889.

Bunce next became the commanding officer of Naval Station New London in New London, Connecticut, on 12 February 1890. On 30 June 1890, he took command of both Training Station Newport in Newport, Rhode Island, and the training ship stationed there, the sloop-of-war USS Richmond. His next assignment, as a member of the Board of Inspection and Survey, began on 21 August 1894. Promoted to commodore on 1 March 1895, he relieved Rear Admiral Richard W. Meade III as commander-in-chief of the North Atlantic Squadron on 27 June 1895.

=== North Atlantic Squadron ===
Since its creation in November 1865, the North Atlantic Squadron had received the U.S. Navy's newest ships and latest equipment, and its commanders-in-chief had the closest relationship with and access to the Department of the Navy's senior leadership in Washington, D.C., of any U.S. Navy squadron commander; both factors made commanding it a plum assignment for senior U.S. Navy flag officers late in their careers. However, like all U.S. Navy squadrons of the nineteenth century, it generally had operated as an administrative command arranging logistics for and coordinating the independent movement of its ships, which operated individually rather than as integrated components of a naval formation trained to operate as a cohesive unit during combat against an enemy fleet; moreover, the squadron's ships generally were poorly designed for such tactical cooperation, and many U.S. Navy officers of the era preferred to operate independently when in command of a ship. Efforts to exercise the squadron as a single combat unit, notably in 1874 and 1886, began to lay the foundation for change but had proved abortive or had limited success in the face of the priority for the squadron's ships to perform individual missions in support of American business interests in the Caribbean, American commercial fishing rights off eastern Canada and the then-separate Crown Colony of Newfoundland, and U.S. Navy public relations goals in visits to American cities along the East and Gulf coasts of the United States.

Bunce believed that modernization of the U.S. Navy required it to develop a true capability to operate its ships effectively in tactical formations, and he took command of the North Atlantic Squadron at a time when it finally had acquired ships designed for tactical squadron operations and had begun to develop a true identity as an operational squadron. His predecessor, Rear Admiral Meade, had taken advantage of political quiet in the Caribbean in 1895 to have ships of the squadron make its annual winter visits to Caribbean ports as a multiship formation rather than relying on visits by individual ships, and had exercised his ships at sea during voyages between the ports. As soon as he took command, Bunce set about building upon Meade's work, conducting tactical exercises in the Atlantic Ocean between August and November 1895 both off New England during the squadron's annual social visit to ports there and during its voyages south to Tompkinsville on Staten Island, New York, and on to Hampton Roads, Virginia.

Bunce planned to follow this up with a Caribbean cruise by the entire squadron from 21 December 1895 to 12 May 1896, with it operating together throughout the cruise and visiting ports strictly as a squadron, without the diversion of individual ships to other tasks; this would have been the first time the entire squadron had made such a cruise together. However, the outbreak of the Cuban War of Independence in Cuba – then a part of the Spanish Empire – and the Department of the Navy's fear that such a deployment would heighten tensions with Spain led to the Department of the Navy cancelling these plans, and the squadron remained at Hampton Roads. Bunce continued to exercise the squadron at sea off Virginia, and gradually sent his ships into various navy yards for refits in the winter and spring of 1896 in order to keep them ready for any operations against Spain. By August 1896, enough ships had returned to the squadron and enough newly commissioned ships had joined it in time for planned late-summer tactical exercises that The New York Times called it "the largest fleet ever assembled by the Navy Department for instruction in fleet tactics at sea." During a social and diplomatic visit to New York City in August 1896, the squadron carried out extensive and complicated tactical exercises at sea, and in early September 1896 under Bunce's command the North Atlantic Squadron battleships USS Indiana, USS Maine, USS Massachusetts, and USS Texas operated together in line and in column during a voyage from New York City to Fishers Island, New York, the first time in history that a division of U.S. Navy battleships operated together as a tactical unit.

After concluding exercises at Fishers Island and off Hampton Roads, Bunce led the North Atlantic Squadron during a complicated exercise in which the squadron simulated a blockade of an enemy port, with Charleston, South Carolina, standing in as the "enemy" port. During this blockading exercise, held from 9 to 13 February 1897, the squadron experimented to determine the optimum operating distance between ships for an effective blockade, as well as with the use of searchlights for night blockading operations and with doctrine and tactics for the interception of blockade runners at night and in fog. Not only did this "blockade" of Charleston require more detailed staff work to arrange logistical support for the ships involved than had been customary previously in the U.S. Navy, it also marked the first time in history that the North Atlantic Squadron practiced offensive operations in enemy waters rather than focusing strictly on the defense of the coast of the United States.

Bunce's leadership of the North Atlantic Squadron between 1895 and 1897 proved important in the history of the U.S. Navy and by extension of the future course of United States history, forging the squadron's ability to conduct modern naval warfare as a cohesive fighting unit in time for it to be prepared for combat against the Spanish Navy in 1898 during the Spanish–American War, a capability it did not have during the 1860s, 1870s, and 1880s. It also provided a foundation for the continued development of U.S. Navy tactical doctrine in the early twentieth century. Discussing the U.S. Navy's handling of battleships at sea, Rear Admiral Robley D. Evans wrote in 1901, "We had mastered it in the only way possible of seamen – by constant work and practice out on the blue water. We all owe much to Admiral Bunce."

On 1 May 1897, Bunce turned command of the North Atlantic Squadron over to Rear Admiral Montgomery Sicard and moved to the final tour of his career, relieving Sicard as commander of the New York Navy Yard in Brooklyn, New York.

=== Later career ===
As commander of the New York Navy Yard, Bunce gave the fateful order to the battleship USS Maine on 8 December 1897 to get underway from New York City and steam to Key West, Florida, to join the North Atlantic Squadron; this led to her deployment to Havana, Cuba, where an explosion destroyed her on 15 February 1898 and precipitated the outbreak of the Spanish–American War in April 1898. He remained at the navy yard throughout the war, being promoted to rear admiral in 1898, and retired from the Navy upon reaching the statutory retirement age of 62 on 25 December 1898.

== Death ==
Bunce was diagnosed with tongue cancer in May 1901 and underwent surgery in Boston, Massachusetts, to have his tongue removed. In September 1901, he was found to have developed throat cancer. Weakened by the disease, he became bedridden in early October 1901 and died at his home in Hartford, Connecticut, on 19 October 1901.

== See also ==
Military offices
Preceded by Richard W. Meade III	Commander-in-Chief, North Atlantic Squadron; 2 June 1895–1 May 1897	Succeeded by Montgomery Sicard
