= Pioneer Valley Regional School District =

School district in Massachusetts, United States

Address
- 97 F. Sumner Turner Rd, Northfield, MA Pioneer Valley Warwick, Northfield, Bernardston, Leyden, Massachusetts, 01360; United States

District information
- Type: Public
- Grades: K–12
- Established: 7-12: 1957; K-12: 1991
- Superintendent: Patricia Kinsella
- Business administrator: TMSolutions Inc.
- Chair of the board: Julie Burke
- Schools: Pioneer Valley Regional School Bernardston Elementary School Northfield Elementary School
- Budget: $14,154,316.00
- District ID: 2509600

Students and staff
- Enrollment: 795
- Faculty: 73.97 FTE
- District mascot: Pioneer Panthers
- Colors: Black and Yellow

Other information
- Website: www.pvrsdk12.org

Pioneer Valley Regional School District is a four town regional school district in eastern and central Franklin County, Massachusetts. Grade K-6 elementary schools are located in Bernardston and Northfield, and the single middle/high school for the entire district (Grades 7–12), Pioneer Valley Regional School, is located in Northfield, Massachusetts. The district was initially formed by the four member towns in 1957 to serve grades 7–12, and became a fully regionalized district K-12 district in 1991. Its administrative offices are housed in Pioneer Valley Regional School at 97 F. Sumner Turner Road, Northfield, Massachusetts.

Pearl Rhodes Elementary School ceased operations after the 2018–2019 school year due to financial constraints and declining student enrollment. Subsequently, Warwick Community School also closed for similar reasons the following year. As a result of these closures, the district now has only two elementary schools remaining.

The schools are:

- Bernardston: Bernardston Elementary School (K-6, serving the towns of Bernardston and Leyden)
- Northfield: Northfield Elementary School (K-6, serving the towns of Northfield and Warwick ) and Pioneer Valley Regional School (7-12, district-wide)

The District is governed by a 12-member School Committee, with three members elected from each of the four district towns.

== See also ==
- Education in Massachusetts
- List of school districts in Massachusetts

== Sources ==
- Page from Massachusetts DESE
- P.V.R.S.D. Official Website.
- NCES- District Directory
