= USS Callao (YFB-11) =

Gunboat of the United States Navy

History

United States
- Name: USS Callao
- Namesake: Callao, a seaport city in Peru (Spanish Navy name retained)
- Builder: Manila Ship Company, Cavite, Philippines
- Launched: 1888
- Completed: 1888
- Acquired: Captured from Spain 12 May 1898
- Commissioned: 17 July 1898
- Fate: Sold for scrap 13 September 1923
- Notes: Served in Spanish Navy as gunboat Callao 1888–1898

General characteristics
- Class & type: Samar-class
- Type: gunboat
- Displacement: 243 long tons (247 t)
- Length: 119 ft (36 m)
- Beam: 17 ft 6 in (5.33 m)
- Draft: 6 ft 6 in (1.98 m)
- Installed power: 250 hp (190 kW)
- Propulsion: 2 × steam engines; 2 × boilers; 2 × shafts
- Speed: 9.7 kn (11.2 mph; 18.0 km/h)
- Capacity: 32 long tons (33 t) coal
- Armament: 4 × 3-pounder guns, 2 × 1-pounder guns
- Armor: None

Callao was a gunboat of the United States Navy which fought in the Spanish–American War and served in the U.S. fleet from 1898 to 1923.

Prior to her U.S. service, Callao was a gunboat in the Spanish Navy. For her characteristics and career in Spanish service, see Spanish gunboat Callao.

== Technical Characteristics ==
Callao was built at Cavite, the Philippines by the Manila Ship Company, intended for Spanish colonial duty in the Philippines. She was both launched and completed in 1888. She had two masts and a steel hull, and was unarmored.

== Operational history ==
Her Spanish crew unaware that the Spanish–American War had broken out, Callao was steaming toward port in Manila Bay on 12 May 1898 when she was taken completely by surprise by the presence and hostile actions of the U.S. Navy's Asiatic Squadron under Commodore George Dewey and was captured by the protected cruiser Raleigh. Callao immediately was put into American service with Lieutenant B. Tappan in command, and was commissioned officially into the U.S. Navy on 17 July 1898 as gunboat USS Callao, with Lieutenant Tappan remaining in command.

Callao served through the remainder of the Spanish War as tender to Commodore Dewey's flagship—the protected cruiser Olympia—as part of Dewey's squadron. She took part in the 13 August 1898 attack on Manila, serving on the left flank of Army forces, who credited her for very effective gunfire support to the troops ashore.

After the war, Callao ranged throughout the Philippines, patrolling to suppress smuggling, covering Army scouting parties operating against Philippine insurgents, transporting troops, and firing on insurgent positions, until decommissioned for repairs at Cavite on 21 February 1901.

Upon her recommissioning on 20 December 1902, Callao carried supplies among the Philippine Islands until February 1903, when she arrived at Hong Kong to begin 13 years of service patrolling the coast and rivers of China with the Yangtze Patrol, together with several other gunboats that the US Navy had captured during the Spanish–American War. Along with her participation in the exercises, maneuvers, and visits of the Asiatic Fleet, she gave essential protection to American citizens and interests, often threatened by political disturbance in volatile China.

Callao was decommissioned at Hong Kong on 31 January 1916, and then sailed for Olongapo, Luzon, the Philippines, where she laid up. While laid up, she was classified as a patrol gunboat with hull number PG-37 on 17 July 1920.

Callao was redesignated as a ferry and returned to service with hull number YFB-11 in June 1921. She served in the 16th Naval District as a ferryboat in the Philippines until sold for scrap at Manila on 13 September 1923.

== Awards ==
- Spanish Campaign Medal
- Philippine Campaign Medal
