= Brad Baker (baseball) =

American baseball player

Bradley Donald Baker (born November 6, 1980, in Brattleboro, Vermont) is a former Minor League Baseball right-handed relief pitcher. Baker threw a fastball which consistently hit 90 mph, an above-average change and an average curve.

== High school ==
Baker attended Pioneer Valley Regional School in Northfield, Massachusetts. He made the varsity baseball team in 8th grade and graduated in 1999 breaking almost all school records. He signed a national letter of intent to play college baseball at the University of Florida but decided to enter professional baseball instead.

== Professional career ==
Baker was drafted by the Boston Red Sox in the 1st Round (40th overall) of the 1999 Draft, he was immediately assigned and played for the Rookie League Gulf Coast Red Sox, where he recorded a 1–0 record, a 0.79 earned run average, and 10 strikeouts in 4 games.

Baker had a career year in 2000 with the Single A Augusta GreenJackets. His statistics included a 12–7 win–loss record, a 3.07 ERA, 126 strikeouts, and 55 walks in 27 games. The following year, Baker played for the Single A Sarasota Red Sox and went 7–9 with a 4.70 ERA and 103 strikeouts. He also played for Sarasota in 2002, going 7–1, with a 2.79 ERA and 65 strikeouts, before being traded to the San Diego Padres on June 26, 2002, for Alan Embree. Just a few weeks after the trade, Baker was honored by being selected to play in the All-Star Futures Game at the MLB All Star Game. Baker finished the season with San Diego's AA affiliate, the Mobile BayBears. He would compile a record of 4–4, with a 4.48 ERA in 12 games with Mobile.

Baker began the 2003 season with the Class A Lake Elsinore Storm, compiling a 3–1 record, a 2.01 ERA, and 69 K before being called up back to AA Mobile. With the BayBears, he went a dismal 1–6 with a 5.68 ERA and 53 strikeouts. In this season Baker would start making relief appearances.

In 2004, still playing with the BayBears, Baker fared much better. For the first time in his career he was moved into the bullpen on a full-time basis as a closer. Baker instantly succeeded in his new role with a 2–1 record, a 1.57 ERA, and 68 strikeouts. Near the end of the season, he was called up to the AAA Portland Beavers, where he played 4 games, recording a stellar 0.93 ERA in 9.2 innings pitched. He led San Diego's minor league organization in saves with 34 in 2004.

Baker went 4–5 with a 4.75 ERA, 75 strikeouts, and 27 saves as the Portland Beavers closer in 2005. He had a good Spring Training, but he did not make the major league roster. He would also not receive a September call-up to the Padres as their closer was future Hall of Fame pitcher Trevor Hoffman and the team was in the middle of a playoff hunt and not looking to give innings to unproven, young pitchers.

Knowing that if he stayed in San Diego he would have to compete for a job with Hoffman, the Atlanta Braves signed Baker as a free agent on November 17, 2005, to a one-year contract. He figured to have an excellent chance of making the 2006 major league club as he had a good spring training and the Braves did not have a closer. However, Baker's velocity, which had once been in the 90's was now only in the mid to high 80's. He was cut from the Braves roster and started the season with AAA Richmond. On May 15, 2006, he was traded back to the team who originally drafted him, the Boston Red Sox, and was assigned to AAA Pawtucket to complete a trade for reliever Franklin Núñez. Baker finished the season going 1–0 with a 2.40 ERA with the Richmond Braves but was 0–0 with a 6.07 ERA with Pawtucket.

In 2007, Baker signed a free agent contract with the Minnesota Twins and split time between the AA New Britain Rock Cats and the AAA Rochester Red Wings. His combined record was 2–7 with an ERA of 5.72.

== Retirement ==
Without much interest from any major league teams for the 2008 season, a newspaper article in March 2008 cited Baker as stating that he was retiring from professional baseball. Baker cited loss of velocity and age as the primary reasons for his retirement.

In 2009 Baker returned to the mound, however, this time with a local non-professional summer league team in the Tri-County League in his native area of Western Massachusetts. Baker has stated that he will be taking classes to move forward to earning a college degree.
