= Spanish gunboat Callao =

History

Spain
- Name: Callao
- Namesake: Callao, a seaport city in Peru
- Builder: Manila Ship Company, Cavite, Philippines
- Launched: 1888
- Completed: 1888
- Commissioned: 1888
- Fate: Captured by U.S. Navy 12 May 1898
- Notes: Served in U.S. Navy as USS Callao 1898–1923

General characteristics
- Class & type: Samar-class
- Type: gunboat
- Displacement: 208 tons
- Length: 119 ft 0 in (36.27 m)
- Beam: 17 ft 6 in (5.33 m)
- Draft: 6 ft 6 in (1.98 m)
- Installed power: 250 hp
- Propulsion: 2-shaft, 2 boilers
- Speed: 9.7 knots
- Complement: 35 officers and enlisted
- Armament: 1 × 3.5 in (87 mm) breech-loading gun; 1 × 37 mm Gatling gun
- Armor: none
- Notes: Coal 32 tons

Callao was a Samar-class gunboat of the Spanish Navy which served in the Spanish fleet from 1888 to 1898 and fought in the Spanish–American War.

Callao was captured by the U.S. Navy in 1898 and commissioned into U.S. service. For her characteristics and career in U.S. service, see USS Callao (YFB-11).

== Technical characteristics ==
Callao was built at Cavite, the Philippines, by the Manila Ship Company, intended for colonial duty in the Philippines. She was both launched and completed in 1888. She had two masts and a steel hull, and was unarmored.

== Operational history ==
Callao spent her Spanish Navy career on colonial duties in the Philippine Islands. When the Spanish–American War began in April 1898, she was at sea on a cruise around the island of Luzon. Her crew was unaware that war had been declared or that the Spanish Navy squadron of Rear Admiral Patricio Montojo y Pasaron had been destroyed by the U.S. Navy's Asiatic Squadron under Commodore George Dewey in the Battle of Manila Bay eleven days earlier when, on 12 May 1898, Callao steamed into Manila Bay en route the harbor.

When Dewey's ships sighted the inbound gunboat, cruiser USS Raleigh got underway to investigate. When it became apparent that Callao was a Spanish ship, Raleigh, cruiser USS Baltimore, and protected cruiser USS Olympia opened fire on her.

Taken utterly by surprise, Callao's crew at first mistook the American ships for Montojo's squadron and the gunfire for target practice by Montojo's ships, but quickly realized that they were under attack and hopelessly outgunned. They struck their colors and surrendered to Raleigh. They were quickly paroled ashore at Cavite, and it was later rumored that the commanding officer of Callao was sentenced to death by Spanish authorities for not fighting back against the American ships.

Callao was immediately put into American service, and was officially commissioned into the U.S. Navy on 17 July 1898 as gunboat USS Callao.
