= William Dorrell (vegetarian) =

American vegetarian, religious leader

- Born: March 15, 1752; Yorkshire
- Died: August 28, 1846 (aged 94); Leyden, Massachusetts

William Dorrell (March 15, 1752 – August 28, 1846) was an American new religious leader of the Dorrellites, a utopian sect located in Leyden, Massachusetts. He was also an early vegetarianism activist.

== Biography ==
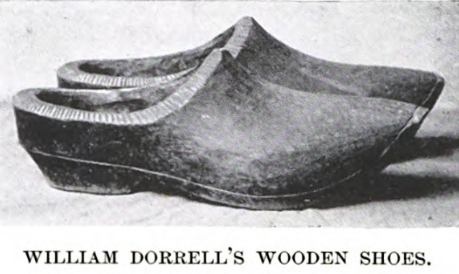

Dorrell was born in Yorkshire. He became a soldier and went abroad to fight in the American Revolutionary War in 1775 under John Burgoyne. He escaped after being taken prisoner at Saratoga. In 1777 he married Polly Chase and resided in Vermont. Dorrell began preaching in 1794 and became known Reverend Dorrell. He founded a religious sect in Leyden, Massachusetts which became known as the Dorrellites.

Dorrell preached a vegetarian message that was founded upon the principle that people should not eat animal flesh or cause the death of any living creature. Members were forbidden to wear leather shoes or the skins of animals for any domestic purpose. Dorrell and his followers wore wooden shoes and lived upon milk and vegetables. Dorrell taught that people not need to pray, they must abide by God's laws and not any man-made law of the church or state. Dorrell advocated a philosophy of free love and did not believe that a man and woman need to marry before sexual intercourse. This caused rumours outside of the sect that Dorrell and his followers engaged in wild sexual activity. By 1798 some members left the community.

Dorrell starved himself to death because he thought he would live forever if he continued to eat. He died in Leyden on August 28, 1846.

Dorrell's wooden shoes are located at the Memorial Hall Museum in Deerfield.

== Religious views ==
Dorrell believed he was a prophet sent to supersede the Christian dispensation and introduce a new one. He did not believe in the resurrection of Jesus or last judgement. He held the view that no prayer or worship is necessary; there is no law but that of nature.

The Dorrellites have been described as discrediting their own sect by their un-social behavior and strange beliefs. They held the view that each generation had a Messiah and William Dorrell was the Messiah of his generation. Dorrell believed he possessed supernatural powers and that he could not be harmed by any man. He retracted this claim after he was knocked down by Capt. Ezekiel Foster at a meeting and this resulted in the disbanding of the sect. Zadock Thompson noted that because of this incident, Dorrell renounced his religious doctrines. Dorrell admitted to his followers that he had duped them.

Historian John Warner Barber suggested that Dorrell "did not believe in the Bible" and was "in the habit of occasionally drinking too much".
