= USS Nantasket =

Gunboat of the United States Navy

History

United States
- Name: USS Nantasket
- Builder: Boston Navy Yard
- Laid down: 1864
- Launched: 15 August 1867
- Commissioned: 22 October 1869
- Stricken: 22 July 1875
- Fate: Sold, 1883

General characteristics
- Type: Gunboat
- Displacement: 1,129 long tons (1,147 t)
- Length: 206 ft (63 m)
- Beam: 32 ft (9.8 m)
- Draft: 12 ft (3.7 m)
- Propulsion: Steam engine, screw
- Speed: 10.5 knots (19.4 km/h; 12.1 mph)
- Complement: 114 officers and enlisted
- Armament: 6 × 9-pounder guns

USS Nantasket was a screw steamer of the United States Navy. Laid down at Boston Navy Yard in 1864; launched on 15 August 1867, sponsored by Miss Emma Hartt; and commissioned on 22 October 1869, Lieutenant Commander Francis M. Bunce in command.

== Service history ==
Assigned to the North Atlantic Squadron, the ship was stationed at Samaná Bay, Santo Domingo, for the next two years. While based at this island, she made numerous short voyages carrying messages to American officials on various islands in the Caribbean. At times, she also carried officials as passengers. She continued this duty until 30 April 1872, when she was relieved by the steamer USS Nipsic. Departing Samana Bay on 5 June, she sailed for Key West arriving on 8 June. She was decommissioned at Portsmouth Navy Yard and remained in ordinary until struck from the Naval Vessel Register on 22 July 1875. She was sold in 1883.
